= Deaths in April 2020 =

The following is a list of notable deaths in April 2020.

Entries for each day are listed alphabetically by surname. A typical entry lists information in the following sequence:

- Name, age, country of citizenship at birth, subsequent country of citizenship (if applicable), reason for notability, cause of death (if known), and reference.

== April 2020 ==
=== 1 ===
- Tony Anderson, 78, Australian footballer.
- Dušan Bartovič, 76, Slovak footballer, 1968 Olympics, Czechoslovak national team.
- Anne Hendricks Bass, 78, American investor and philanthropist.
- Branislav Blažić, 63, Serbian surgeon and politician, Minister of Environmental Protection (1998–2000), COVID-19.
- Tony Branson, 73, Australian rugby league player (St. George Dragons).
- Peter Brooke, 90, American businessman.
- Jaxon Buell, 5, American microhydranencephaly victim.
- Zev Buffman, 89, Israeli theatre producer, President and CEO of Ruth Eckerd Hall (2011–2018).
- Mario Chaldú, 77, Argentine footballer (Club Atlético Banfield, Racing Club, national team).
- Bruce Dawe, 90, Australian poet.
- Ricardo Díez Hochleitner, 91, Spanish economist and diplomat, president of the Club of Rome (1991–2000).
- David Driskell, 88, American visual artist and academic, COVID-19.
- Kevin Duffy, 87, American jurist, Judge of the U.S. District Court for Southern New York (1972–2016), COVID-19.
- Bernard Epin, 83, French writer and literary critic, COVID-19.
- Ed Farmer, 70, American baseball player (Chicago White Sox, Philadelphia Phillies) and broadcaster, kidney disease.
- Edward L. Feightner, 100, American Navy officer and flying ace.
- Luiz Flávio Gomes, 62, Brazilian jurist, professor and politician, Deputy (since 2019), leukaemia.
- Sir James Learmonth Gowans, 95, British immunologist.
- Irving Greenfield, 91, American author.
- Nur Hassan Hussein, 82, Somali politician, Prime Minister (2007–2009), COVID-19.
- Martin Khor, 68, Malaysian journalist (The Star) and economist, executive director of the South Centre (2009–2018), cancer.
- Philippe Malaurie, 95, French lawyer.
- Gérard Mannoni, 92, French sculptor.
- Ellis Marsalis Jr., 85, American jazz pianist, COVID-19.
- Roger Marshall, 86, English screenwriter.
- Ronn Matlock, 72, American singer and songwriter.
- Rüdiger Nehberg, 84, German human rights activist and survival expert.
- Floris Michael Neusüss, 83, German photographer.
- Richard Passman, 94, American aeronautical engineer and space scientist, COVID-19.
- Dirceu Pinto, 39, Brazilian Paralympic boccia player (2008, 2012, 2016), heart failure.
- Bucky Pizzarelli, 94, American jazz guitarist, COVID-19.
- Dieter Reith, 82, German pianist and organist.
- Harold Rubin, 87, South African-born Israeli jazz clarinettist.
- Gerardo Ruiz Esparza, 70, Mexican politician, Secretary of Communications and Transportation (2012–2018), stroke.
- Yvonne Schaloske, 68, Swedish actress (Rederiet).
- Adam Schlesinger, 52, American musician (Fountains of Wayne, Ivy) and songwriter ("That Thing You Do"), Emmy winner (2012, 2013, 2019), COVID-19.
- Amerigo Severini, 88, Italian cyclo-cross cyclist.
- John Stanich, 95, American basketball player.
- Joe Tanner, 88, American baseball player.
- John Tydeman, 84, English radio producer and theatre director.
- Ricardo Viera, 75, Cuban-born American painter, printmaker, professor, museum director, and curator
- Dora Werzberg, 99, French nurse and social worker.
- Mahmoud Zakzouk, 86, Egyptian academic and politician, Minister of Awqaf (1995–2011).

=== 2 ===
- Mike Appleton, 83, British television producer (The Old Grey Whistle Test).
- Robert Beck, 83, American modern pentathlete, Olympic bronze medalist (1960) and Pan American champion (1963), complications from a head injury and COVID-19.
- Goyo Benito, 73, Spanish footballer (Real Madrid, Rayo Vallecano, national team), COVID-19.
- Ranko Borozan, 86, Bosnian footballer (Velež Mostar, Partizan, Red Star Belgrade).
- Patricia Bosworth, 86, American actress (The Nun's Story) and author, COVID-19.
- John B. Bryant, 72, American economist.
- Bernardita Catalla, 62, Filipino diplomat, ambassador to Lebanon (since 2017), COVID-19.
- Zaccaria Cometti, 83, Italian footballer (Atalanta), COVID-19.
- Oskar Fischer, 97, German politician, Minister for Foreign Affairs of the GDR (1975–1990).
- William Frankland, 108, British immunologist, COVID-19.
- François de Gaulle, 98, French missionary, COVID-19.
- Louis J. Gill, 80, American politician, member of the New Jersey General Assembly (1988–1992).
- Juan Giménez, 76, Argentine comic book artist (Heavy Metal, Métal hurlant), COVID-19.
- A. Bruce Goldman, 84, American rabbi and photographer, complications from COVID-19.
- Ron Graham, 93, English-Australian actor (Home and Away, Waterloo Station).
- Don Healy, 83, American football player (Chicago Bears, Dallas Cowboys, Buffalo Bills).
- Astrid Nøklebye Heiberg, 83, Norwegian politician, MP (1985–1989, since 2013), president of the IFRC (1997–2001).
- Gedale B. Horowitz, 87, American banker.
- Daniel Jacoby, 86, French lawyer and human rights activist.
- Walentyna Janta-Połczyńska, 107, Polish political exile.
- Anick Jesdanun, 51, American technology journalist (Associated Press), COVID-19.
- Nirmal Singh Khalsa, 67, Indian singer and priest (Darbar Sahib), COVID-19.
- Eddie Large, 78, British comedian (Little and Large), heart failure and COVID-19.
- João Marcos, 66, Brazilian footballer (Palmeiras, Grêmio), esophageal disease.
- Maeve McKean, 40, American lawyer, health official and academic, drowning.
- James Megellas, 103, American military officer.
- Janez Mlinar, 78, Slovenian Olympic skier (1968).
- Manolo Navarro, 95, Spanish bullfighter, COVID-19.
- Jack P. Oliver, 88, American politician.
- Feriha Öz, 87, Turkish academic and pathologist, COVID-19.
- Rodrigo Pesántez Rodas, 82, Ecuadorian writer and poet, COVID-19.
- Emmitt Peters, 79, American dog musher.
- Hans Reiss, 97, German-born Irish academic.
- Sergio Rossi, 84, Italian shoe designer (Sergio Rossi), COVID-19.
- Aaron Rubashkin, 92, American businessman, patriarch of the Rubashkin family, COVID-19.
- Paul Sauvé, 80, Canadian curler.
- George Shepperson, 98, British historian.
- Shamsur Rahman Sherif, 79, Bangladeshi politician, Minister of Land (2014–2019).
- Arnold Sowinski, 89, French footballer (RC Lens), COVID-19.
- Claudio Spies, 95, Chilean-born American composer.
- J. Kirk Sullivan, 84, American politician, complications from congestive heart failure.
- Carl Tacy, 87, American college basketball coach (Wake Forest Demon Deacons, Marshall Thundering Herd).
- Aptripel Tumimomor, 53, Indonesian politician, Regent of North Morowali (since 2016), COVID-19.
- Jan Veentjer, 82, Dutch Olympic field hockey player (1964).
- Mel Watkins, 87, Canadian political economist.
- Arthur Whistler, 75, American ethnobotanist and author, COVID-19.
- Logan Williams, 16, Canadian actor (When Calls the Heart, The Flash), accidental fentanyl overdose.
- Keizo Yamada, 92, Japanese Olympic long-distance runner (1952).
- Jacques Yankel, 99, French artist.

=== 3 ===
- Yūtokutaishi Akiyama, 85, Japanese engraver and photographer.
- Robert Armstrong, Baron Armstrong of Ilminster, 93, British civil servant, Cabinet Secretary (1979–1987) and Lord Temporal (since 1998).
- Steven C. Beering, 87, German-born American physician and academic, President of Purdue University (1983–2000).
- Karel Beyers, 77, Belgian footballer.
- Helin Bölek, 28, Turkish singer (Grup Yorum), starvation following hunger strike.
- Arnold Demain, 92, American microbiologist, COVID-19.
- Henri Ecochard, 96, French military officer, COVID-19.
- Ira Einhorn, 79, American convicted murderer and fugitive.
- Giovanni Paolo Gibertini, 97, Italian Roman Catholic prelate, Bishop of Ales-Terralba (1983–1989) and Reggio Emilia-Guastalla (1989–1998).
- Bob Glanzer, 74, American politician, member of the South Dakota House of Representatives (since 2017), COVID-19.
- Alexander A. Gurshtein, 83, Russian astronomer.
- Jean-Pierre Héritier, 66, Swiss archer.
- Francisco Hernando Contreras, 74, Spanish housing developer, COVID-19.
- Marguerite Lescop, 104, Canadian writer, COVID-19.
- George Mackie, 70, Scottish rugby union player (Highland RFC, national team), cancer.
- Hans Meyer, 94, South African actor (Colditz).
- Janet Mullarney, 68, Irish artist and sculptor.
- C. W. Nicol, 79, Welsh-born Japanese writer, cancer.
- Yoichi Nishimaru, 93, Japanese physician.
- Marlo Pascual, 47, American artist, cancer.
- Hans Prade, 81, Surinamese diplomat, COVID-19.
- Omar Quintana, 76, Ecuadorian politician and sports executive, President of the National Congress (2005), president of C.S. Emelec, COVID-19.
- Marcelle Ranson-Hervé, 90, French actress (Now Where Did the 7th Company Get to?, Robert et Robert), COVID-19.
- Francis Robicsek, 94, American cardio-thoracic surgeon.
- Tim Robinson, 85, English writer and cartographer, COVID-19.
- Joel Shatzky, 76, American writer and literary professor, complications of COVID-19.
- Yusuf Kenan Sönmez, 71–72, Turkish politician, MP (1987–1991), COVID-19.
- Arlene Stringer-Cuevas, 86, American politician, member of the New York City Council (1976–1977), COVID-19.
- Thio Gim Hock, 82, Singaporean Olympic water polo player (1956) and property developer, blood disease and kidney failure.
- Albino Trevisan, 89, Italian Olympic rower.
- Tweedy Bird Loc, 52, American rapper.
- Eric Verdonk, 60, New Zealand rower, Olympic bronze medallist (1988), cancer.
- Constand Viljoen, 86, South African general and politician, MP (1994–2001).
- Frida Wattenberg, 95, French resistance member, COVID-19.

=== 4 ===
- Barry Allen, 74, Canadian rock musician and record producer (Painter).
- Jerónimo Arango, 92–93, Mexican businessman (Walmart de México y Centroamérica).
- Arminsyah, 59, Indonesian prosecutor, Vice Attorney General (since 2017), traffic collision.
- Luis Eduardo Aute, 76, Filipino-born Spanish artist.
- Alexander Thynn, 7th Marquess of Bath, 87, English politician and artist, Lord Temporal (1992–1999), COVID-19.
- Jay Benedict, 68, American actor (Foyle's War, Double Team, The Dark Knight Rises), COVID-19.
- Philippe Bodson, 75, Belgian businessman and politician, Senator (1999–2003), COVID-19.
- Violet Brand, 91, English author.
- Timothy Brown, 82, American singer, actor (M*A*S*H), and football player (Philadelphia Eagles, Baltimore Colts), complications of dementia.
- Carol Burkett, 74, American drag racing driver.
- Rafael Leonardo Callejas Romero, 76, Honduran politician, President (1990–1994), cardiac arrest.
- Allyson Carlyle, 65, American scholar.
- Silvano Carroli, 81, Italian baritone.
- Irena Chalmers, 84, British-born American author and food commentator, esophageal cancer.
- Forrest Compton, 94, American actor (The Edge of Night, Gomer Pyle, U.S.M.C., The F.B.I.), COVID-19.
- Tom Dempsey, 73, American football player (New Orleans Saints, Philadelphia Eagles, Los Angeles Rams), COVID-19.
- Shan Deniston, 101, American athlete and sports coach.
- George Dweh, 59, Liberian politician and warlord, speaker of the National Transitional Legislative Assembly of Liberia (2003–2005).
- Mieczysław Długoborski, 89, Polish Olympic athlete (1952).
- Xavier Dor, 91, French embryologist and anti-abortion activist, COVID-19.
- Brian Falconer, 86, Australian footballer.
- Ken Farnum, 89, Barbadian-born Jamaican Olympic cyclist (1952), COVID-19.
- Lila Fenwick, 87, American lawyer and human rights advocate, COVID-19.
- Franz Födermayr, 86, Austrian musicologist.
- Carlos González-Artigas, 72, Ecuadorian businessman, COVID-19.
- James Gooch, 85, American psychiatrist and psychoanalyst.
- Bashirul Haq, 77, Bangladeshi architect.
- Alex Harvey, 79, American singer, songwriter ("Delta Dawn" and actor (Gettysburg, Fire Down Below, The Rainmaker).
- Rhoda Hatch, 73, American anti-war activist and public school educator, complications from COVID-19.
- Arnold Heertje, 86, Dutch economist.
- Włodzimierz Klonowski, 75, Polish biomedical physicist.
- Volodymyr Korolyuk, 94, Ukrainian mathematician.
- Carlo Leva, 90, Italian production designer and set decorator (The Cat o' Nine Tails), heart attack.
- Vincent Lionti, 60, American violist and conductor, COVID-19.
- Leïla Menchari, 92, Tunisian decorator and designer (Hermès), COVID-19.
- Andrea Mitchell, 64, Australian politician, WA MLA (2008–2017), heart condition.
- Olan Montgomery, 56, American actor (Stranger Things) and pop artist, COVID-19.
- Marcel Moreau, 86, Belgian writer, COVID-19.
- Jerrold Mundis, 79, American author and speaker, complications from COVID-19.
- Pertti Paasio, 81, Finnish politician, Minister of Foreign Affairs (1989–1991) and MP (1975–1979, 1982–1996).
- Susanna Ramel, 100, Swedish actress.
- Rao Pingru, 97, Chinese comic book author (Our Story: A Memoir of Love and Life in China), multiple organ failure.
- Arlene Schnitzer, 91, American art collector and philanthropist.
- Anton Sebastianpillai, 75, Sri Lankan born British geriatrician and author, COVID-19.
- Muhammad Sirajul Islam, 77, Bangladeshi politician, MP (1973–1982), COVID-19.
- Victor Skrebneski, 90, American photographer, cancer.
- Börje Stattin, 90, Swedish Olympic gymnast (1952).
- Harland Svare, 89, American football player and coach (New York Giants, Los Angeles Rams), respiratory arrest.
- Founéké Sy, 33, Malian footballer (Korofina, Sanat Naft, national team), traffic collision.
- Ivan Vakarchuk, 73, Ukrainian physicist, Minister of Education and Science (2007–2010) and rector of the University of Lviv (1990–2007, 2010–2013).
- Peter Vaughan, 89, British Anglican clergyman, Bishop of Ramsbury (1989–1998).
- Ezio Vendrame, 72, Italian footballer (Lanerossi Vicenza, Napoli, Padova) and writer, cancer.
- Cheryl Wall, 71, American literary critic.
- Michel Wiblé, 97, Swiss composer and teacher.
- Mohammad Ali Younes, Lebanese spy, head of Hezbollah's counter espionage unit, shot.

=== 5 ===
- Michel Andrault, 93, French architect (Tours Société Générale, AccorHotels Arena).
- Ray Authement, 91, American academic administrator, President of the University of Louisiana at Lafayette (1974–2008).
- Ed Biles, 88, American football coach (Houston Oilers), leukemia.
- Honor Blackman, 94, English actress (The Avengers, Goldfinger, Jason and the Argonauts).
- Margaret Burbidge, 100, British-born American astronomer, complications from a fall.
- Jocelyn Burton, 74, British silver and goldsmith, bowel cancer.
- Gregory W. Carman, 83, American politician and jurist, U.S. representative (1981–1983), Judge (since 1983) and Chief Judge (1996–2003) of the U.S. Court of International Trade.
- André Cristol, 77, French footballer (Montpellier, Limoges).
- Shirley Douglas, 86, Canadian actress (Wind at My Back, Lolita, Barney's Great Adventure) and civil rights activist, complications from pneumonia.
- Barry Downs, 89, Australian Olympic sports shooter (1968).
- Ronnie Earle, 78, American politician and judge, Texas state representative (1973–1976).
- Svein Ellingsen, 90, Norwegian hymnist and visual artist.
- Ben Elliott, 67, American audio engineer (Pure Rock Fury, Masters of War) and record producer, complications from cancer.
- Jun Factoran, 76, Filipino lawyer and politician, Secretary of Environment and Natural Resources (1987–1992).
- Lee Fierro, 91, American actress (Jaws), COVID-19.
- James S. Gracey, 92, American admiral.
- Daniel Greene, 86, American artist.
- Bob Hermann, 97, American Hall of Fame soccer executive, president and founder of the NASL, owner of the St. Louis Stars, namesake of Hermann Trophy and Hermann Stadium.
- Ray Hiron, 76, English footballer (Portsmouth, Reading).
- Ivan Itkin, 84, American politician, member of the Pennsylvania House of Representatives (1973–1998), heart failure.
- Mahmoud Jibril, 67, Libyan politician, Minister of Foreign Affairs and Prime Minister (2011), COVID-19.
- Tom Larkin, 88–89, Irish hurler (Tipperary).
- Sir John Laws, 74, English jurist, High Court Judge (1992–1998) and Lord Justice of Appeal (1999–2016), sepsis and COVID-19.
- Pentti Linkola, 87, Finnish deep ecologist and writer.
- John Lucas, 90, English philosopher.
- Bobby Mitchell, 84, American Hall of Fame football player (Cleveland Browns, Washington Redskins) and executive.
- Dougie Morgan, 73, Scottish rugby union player (Stewart's Melville, British and Irish Lions, national team).
- George Ogilvie, 89, Australian theatre and film director (Mad Max Beyond Thunderdome), cardiac arrest.
- Michel Parisse, 83, French historian and professor, COVID-19.
- John A. Shaw, 81, American civil servant, heart failure.
- Donald Simpson, 77, American librarian, president of the Center for Research Libraries (1980–1999).
- Agop Terzan, 92, French-Armenian astronomer.
- André Verroken, 80, Belgian furniture designer and interior architect.
- Peter Walker, 84, English cricketer (Glamorgan, national team), stroke.
- Hank Whitney, 80, American basketball player.

=== 6 ===
- Radomir Antić, 71, Serbian football player (Partizan) and manager (Atlético Madrid, national team), pancreatitis.
- M. K. Arjunan, 84, Indian composer.
- Helène Aylon, 89, American ecofeminist artist, COVID-19.
- Claude Barthélemy, 74, Haitian footballer (Detroit Cougars, national team).
- Roger Beatty, 87, American director, screenwriter and stage manager (The Carol Burnett Show, Mama's Family, The Billion Dollar Hobo), prostate cancer.
- Josep Maria Benet i Jornet, 79, Spanish playwright and screenwriter, COVID-19.
- Black the Ripper, 33, British grime MC, rapper and cannabis activist, heart attack.
- Marcel Boillat, 90, Swiss political activist.
- Colleen Callaghan, 89, American makeup artist (A Beautiful Mind, The Curious Case of Benjamin Button, Chicago), BAFTA winner (2009).
- Pat Capponi, 70, Canadian writer and mental health advocate, assisted suicide.
- Marc Chardonnens, 59–60, Swiss government official, Director of the Federal Office for the Environment (2016–2020).
- Alfonso Cortina, 76, Spanish businessman, chairman and CEO of Repsol YPF (1996–2004), COVID-19.
- John Dossetor, 94, Indian-born Canadian physician.
- James Drury, 85, American actor (The Virginian, Forbidden Planet, The Young Warriors).
- Jock Edwards, 64, New Zealand cricketer (Central Districts, national team).
- Armando Francioli, 100, Italian actor (The Pharaohs' Woman, The Opium Den, Hawk of the Caribbean).
- Ferenc Füzesi, 59, Hungarian Olympic handball player (1992).
- James Garbutt, 94, English actor (When the Boat Comes In, Superman, The Onedin Line).
- Gerhard Giebisch, 93, Austrian-born American physiologist.
- Bruce Gonsalves, 63, Australian footballer.
- Earl G. Graves Sr., 85, American entrepreneur and businessman, founder of Black Enterprise.
- Sergio Guenza, 87, Italian football player (Lazio) and manager (women's national team).
- Onaje Allan Gumbs, 70, American pianist.
- Vic Henley, 57, American comedian, pulmonary embolism.
- Jack Hill, 75, American politician, member of the Georgia State Senate (since 1991).
- Stig Holmqvist, 84, Finnish footballer (HIFK Helsinki, HJK Helsinki, national team).
- Al Kaline, 85, American Hall of Fame baseball player, broadcaster and executive (Detroit Tigers), World Series Champion (1968).
- Brahm Kanchibhotla, 66, Indian-American journalist, COVID-19.
- Jacques Le Brun, 88, French historian, COVID-19.
- Claude Le Pen, 72, French economist.
- Jean Little, 88, Canadian writer (Mine for Keeps, From Anna, Orphan at My Door).
- Adlin Mair-Clarke, 78, Jamaican Olympic athlete (1964, 1968), complications from COVID-19.
- Mary McPartlan, 65, Irish singer, musician and producer.
- Fred Mecklenburg, 84, American obstetrician-gynecologist.
- Trevor Platt, 77, British marine scientist.
- William R. Polk, 91, American foreign policy consultant and author, leukemia.
- Bullet Prakash, 44, Indian comedian and actor (Mast Maja Maadi, Aithalakkadi, Aryan), liver failure.
- Jayantha Rathnayake, 51, Sri Lankan musician, cancer.
- Lucien Schmitthäusler, 85, French writer.
- James F. Scott, 77, American physicist.
- Fred Singer, 95, Austrian-born American physicist.
- Mark Steiner, 77, American philosopher, COVID-19.
- Jock Steven, 84, Scottish rugby union player (Barbarians).
- Eugene Stowe, 97, American Church of the Nazarene minister and general superintendent.
- Stephen Sulyk, 95, Polish-born American Ukrainian Catholic hierarch, Archbishop of Philadelphia (1980–2000), COVID-19.
- Riay Tatary, 72, Syrian-born Spanish doctor and imam, president of Islamic Commission of Spain (from 1992), COVID-19.
- Naek L. Tobing, 79, Indonesian physician and sexologist, COVID-19.
- Eli Velder, 94, American academic.
- Tim White, 68, British painter.
- Benjamin Zablocki, 79, American sociologist.

=== 7 ===
- Albert Almoznino, 97, Israeli hand shadow artist.
- Betty Bennett, 98, American jazz and big band singer.
- Christian Bonnet, 98, French politician, Minister of the Interior (1977–1981).
- Roger Chappot, 79, Swiss Olympic ice hockey player (1964), COVID-19.
- Robert Chaudenson, 82, French Creole linguist, COVID-19.
- Jim Clarko, 87, Australian politician, WA MLA (1974–1996).
- Jean-Laurent Cochet, 85, French stage director and actor (A Thousand Billion Dollars, Fort Saganne), COVID-19.
- Peter Cory, 94, Canadian judge, Puisne Justice of the Supreme Court of Canada (1989–1999).
- Faith Dane, 96, American actress (Gypsy) and politician.
- Hutch Davie, 89, American pianist, arranger and composer.
- Eddy Davis, 79, American musician and bandleader, COVID-19.
- Claire Deluca, 86, French actress and theatre director.
- Fariborz Esmaeili, 79, Iranian Olympic footballer (1964).
- Steve Farmer, 71, American musician (The Amboy Dukes) and songwriter ("Journey to the Center of the Mind").
- Charlotte Figi, 13, American medical cannabidiol patient and reform figure, namesake of Charlotte's web cannabis, seizure.
- Jacques Frémontier, 89, French journalist and television producer.
- Allen Garfield, 80, American actor (The Conversation, Nashville, Beverly Hills Cop II), COVID-19.
- Henry Geller, 96, American communications lawyer and government official.
- Henry Graff, 98, American historian, COVID-19.
- Leib Groner, 88, American Chabad-Lubavitch Rabbi and secretary to Menachem Schneerson, COVID-19.
- Irene Hirano, 71, American non-profit executive, president of U.S.-Japan Council (since 2009) and the Japanese American National Museum (2008–2012).
- Norman Holwell, 91, British speed skater (1952).
- Hudeidi, 91, Somali oud player, COVID-19.
- M. A. Jabbar, 80, Bangladeshi politician, MP (2008–2014).
- Monica Jackson, 99, Scottish mountaineer.
- Sasi Kalinga, 59, Indian actor (Paleri Manikyam: Oru Pathirakolapathakathinte Katha, Pranchiyettan & the Saint, Indian Rupee), liver disease.
- Mishik Kazaryan, 72, Russian physicist, COVID-19.
- Louise Kramer, 96, American artist.
- Jan Křen, 89, Czech historian, academic and dissident, Charter 77 signatory, COVID-19.
- Quenton Leach, 47, Australian footballer (Fremantle), testicular cancer.
- John Percy Leon Lewis, 77, Guyanese military officer, COVID-19.
- Fred Mandeville, 97, Canadian politician.
- John Matias, 75, American baseball player (Chicago White Sox).
- Roger Matthews, 71, British criminologist, COVID-19.
- Thomas Mensah, 87, Ghanaian judge.
- Amira Nur al-Din, 94–95, Iraqi poet.
- Yaakov Perlow, 89, American Novominsk rebbe, president of Agudah, COVID-19.
- John Prine, 73, American singer-songwriter ("Sam Stone", "Angel from Montgomery"), Grammy winner (1992, 2006), COVID-19.
- Nipper Read, 95, British police officer and boxing administrator, COVID-19.
- Jan Reijnen, 93, Dutch politician, mayor of Wervershoof (1964–1969), Oldenzaal (1969–1976) and Heerlen (1976–1986), Senator (1972–1977).
- Donato Sabia, 56, Italian Olympic middle-distance runner (1984, 1988), COVID-19.
- Julie Sauvé, 67, Canadian swimming coach.
- Harv Schmidt, 83, American college basketball player and coach (Illinois Fighting Illini).
- Tom Scully, 89, Irish Gaelic football manager (Offaly), COVID-19.
- Barbara Smoker, 96, British humanist activist, president of the National Secular Society (1972–1996).
- George A. Snow, 96, Canadian politician, complications from pneumonia.
- Herb Stempel, 93, American game show contestant (Twenty-One), whistleblower in the 1950s quiz show scandals.
- Adrian V. Stokes, 74, British computer scientist and disability campaigner.
- André Stordeur, 79, Belgian electronic musician.
- Miguel Ángel Tábet, 78, Venezuelan theologian and exegete, COVID-19.
- Joaquim Tosas, 73–74, Spanish politician and engineer, president of Port of Barcelona (1996–2004), COVID-19.
- Domingo Villanueva, 55, Filipino Olympic cyclist (1988, 1992).
- Ian Willmore, 61, British politician and activist, heart attack.
- Hal Willner, 64, American music producer (Saturday Night Live, Stay Awake), COVID-19.

=== 8 ===
- Siri Berg, 98, Swedish-born American abstract artist.
- Tom Blackwell, 82, American artist, COVID-19.
- Richard Brodsky, 73, American lawyer and politician, member of the New York State Assembly (1983–2010), heart attack.
- Dirk van den Broek, 96, Dutch supermarket founder.
- L. Carl Brown, 91, American historian.
- Jaroslava Brychtová, 95, Czech glass artist.
- Aubrey Burl, 93, British archaeologist.
- Boško Bursać, 74, Bosnian footballer (Rijeka, Vitesse Arnhem, NK Zagreb).
- Robert L. Carroll, 81, American-Canadian palaeontologist, COVID-19.
- Keith Critchlow, 87, British artist and professor of architecture.
- Carl Dobkins Jr., 79, American singer ("My Heart Is an Open Book").
- John Downing, 79, Welsh photojournalist, cancer.
- Jackie du Preez, 77, Zimbabwean cricketer (Rhodesia, South Africa).
- Peter Ecklund, 74, American jazz cornetist, complications from Parkinson's disease.
- Madeleine Fischer, 84, Swiss-born Italian actress (Le Amiche, The Bachelor, The Day the Sky Exploded).
- Martin S. Fox, 95, American publisher, COVID-19.
- Glenn Fredly, 44, Indonesian singer, meningitis.
- Norah Gibbons, 67, Irish children's rights activist.
- Bjørn Haug, 91, Norwegian jurist.
- Hiphei, 82, Indian politician, MP (1990–2002).
- John Hughes, 66, Canadian ice hockey player (Cincinnati Stingers).
- Abdul Momin Imambari, 89–90, Bangladeshi Islamic scholar and politician.
- Miguel Jones, 81, Equatoguinean-born Spanish footballer (Barakaldo, Indautxu, Atlético Madrid), COVID-19.
- Bernie Juskiewicz, 77, American politician, member of the Vermont House of Representatives (2013–2019), COVID-19.
- Lois Kelly Miller, 102, Jamaican actress (Meet Joe Black).
- Jonathan Kpakpo, 77, Ghanaian footballer, COVID-19.
- Joel J. Kupperman, 83, American philosopher, complications from COVID-19.
- Paul Lambert, 61, British television and media producer, suicide.
- Francesco La Rosa, 93, Italian footballer (Pro Patria, Palermo, national team), COVID-19.
- Ted Leverenz, 78, American politician, Illinois state representative (1975–1991) and State Senator (1991–1993).
- Lars-Eric Lundvall, 86, Swedish ice hockey player (Frölunda), world champion (1962) and Olympic silver medallist (1964).
- François Luc Macosso, 81, Congolese politician.
- Henri Madelin, 83, French Jesuit theologian and editor, COVID-19.
- Rick May, 79, Canadian-American voice actor (Team Fortress 2, Star Fox, Sly 3: Honor Among Thieves), COVID-19.
- David Méresse, 89, French footballer (CO Roubaix-Tourcoing, FC Sète 34).
- Valeriu Muravschi, 70, Moldovan politician, Prime Minister (1991–1992), Minister of Finance (1990–1991) and MP (1998–2001).
- Norman I. Platnick, 68, American arachnologist and curator (American Museum of Natural History).
- Robert Poujade, 91, French politician, Deputy (1967–1981, 1986–2002) and mayor of Dijon (1971–2001).
- Toni Rettaliata, 75, American politician, member of the New York State Assembly (1979–1987).
- John A. Rocco, 83, American politician, member of the New Jersey General Assembly (1980–1998), mayor of Cherry Hill, New Jersey (1975–1977), respiratory failure.
- Chynna Rogers, 25, American rapper, drug overdose.
- Larry Sherman, American house music publisher, founder of Trax Records, heart failure.
- Pat Stapleton, 79, Canadian ice hockey player (Chicago Blackhawks, Boston Bruins), stroke.
- Nicholas Temperley, 87, English-born American musicologist.
- Linda Tripp, 70, American civil servant and whistleblower (Clinton–Lewinsky scandal), pancreatic cancer.
- Te Huirangi Waikerepuru, 91, New Zealand trade unionist and Māori language activist.
- Albert H. Wilkening, 74, American major general, cancer.

=== 9 ===
- Torvild Aakvaag, 93, Norwegian businessman, CEO of Norsk Hydro (1984–1991).
- Sufia Ahmed, 87, Bangladeshi academic, cardiac arrest.
- Reggie Bagala, 54, American politician, member of the Louisiana House of Representatives (since 2020), COVID-19.
- Dame Jocelyn Barrow, 90, British educator, community activist and politician.
- Leila Benitez-McCollum, 89, Filipino-American television and radio host (Student Canteen), COVID-19.
- Daniel Bernard, 70, French footballer (Rennes, Paris Saint-Germain, Brest).
- Jim Bolger, 88, American baseball player (Chicago Cubs).
- Frank J. Brown, 63–64, American visual artist.
- Tom Bruce, 67, American swimmer, 1972 Olympic gold and silver medallist.
- Jacques Calvet, 88, French businessman, CEO of Groupe PSA.
- Dan Canter, 58, American soccer player.
- Denise Coia, 67, Scottish psychiatrist.
- Jim Conacher, 98, Scottish-born Canadian ice hockey player (New York Rangers, Chicago Black Hawks).
- Elizabeth de la Porte, 78, British harpsichordist.
- Surésh Dhargalkar, 85, British architect.
- Malcolm Dixon, 85, English actor (Time Bandits, Return of the Jedi, Flash Gordon).
- Mort Drucker, 91, American caricaturist and comics artist (Mad).
- Duncan Ellis, 90, Canadian football player (Hamilton Tiger-Cats).
- Marc Engels, 54, Belgian sound engineer (The Odyssey, I'm Dead but I Have Friends), COVID-19.
- Stan Gilligan, 91, English wrestler, COVID-19.
- Mark Golden, 71, Canadian historian.
- Harvey Goldstein, 80, British statistician and academic, COVID-19.
- Andy González, 69, American jazz and Latin dance bassist.
- Eugene Goodheart, 88, American literary scholar.
- Simplice Guédet Manzela, 71, Gabonese politician.
- Clément-Joseph Hannouche, 70, Egyptian Syriac Catholic hierarch, Bishop of Cairo (since 1995).
- Ho Kam-ming, 94, Macanese-born Canadian martial artist, COVID-19.
- Zdeněk Jičínský, 91, Czech lawyer and politician, Deputy (1996–2002, 2003–2010).
- Jay K. Katzen, 83, American politician and bureaucrat, member of the Virginia House of Delegates (1994–2002).
- Theresa M. Korn, 94, American engineer and pilot, COVID-19.
- Heino Kurvet, 78, Estonian sprint canoer, 1971 World Championships bronze medallist.
- Vladimir Lefebvre, 83, Soviet-American mathematical psychologist.
- Phyllis Lyon, 95, American gay rights activist.
- Liliane Marchais, 84, French political activist.
- Jacqueline Mason, 84, Australian pair skater.
- Virginia Savage McAlester, 76, American architectural historian, myelofibrosis.
- Helen McGehee, 98, American dancer and choreographer.
- Guy Miserque, 74, Belgian Olympic field hockey player (1964, 1968, 1972, 1976).
- Naoki Murata, 70, Japanese judoka, heart failure.
- Lee Nurse, 43, English cricketer (Berkshire), COVID-19.
- Gern Nagler, 88, American football player (Chicago Cardinals, Cleveland Browns).
- Vitor Sapienza, 86, Brazilian politician and economist, COVID-19.
- Christopher Schmitt, 45, American web designer and author.
- Ida Schuster, 101, Scottish actress (Death Watch, A Shot at Glory).
- Ernst-Georg Schwill, 81, German actor (Alarm in the Circus, A Berlin Romance, The Shield and the Sword).
- Junzo Sekine, 93, Japanese Hall of Fame baseball player (Osaka Kintetsu Buffaloes, Yomiuri Giants) and manager (Yakult Swallows).
- Dmitri Smirnov, 71, Russian-born British composer (Tiriel, The Lamentations of Thel), COVID-19.
- Jean-Pierre St-Louis, 68–69, Canadian photographic director and videographer (Requiem for a Handsome Bastard, Whoever Dies, Dies in Pain).
- Richard Teitelbaum, 80, American electronic music composer, stroke.
- Jon Tennant, 31, English paleontologist and open science activist, traffic collision.
- Taufiq Tirmizi, 59, Pakistani cricketer (House Building Finance Corporation, Karachi Whites).
- Saul Turteltaub, 87, American television writer and producer (That Girl, Sanford and Son, What's Happening!!).
- Phyllis Wallbank, 101, British educationalist.
- Won Pyong-oh, 90, South Korean ornithologist.
- Jim Youel, 98, American football player (Washington Redskins).

=== 10 ===
- Mike Auret, 83, Zimbabwean-Irish farmer and politician.
- Bruce Baillie, 88, American filmmaker (Castro Street).
- Dov Ben-Dov, 93, Israeli Olympic sports shooter (1952).
- Julio Blanco, 82, Cuban footballer (FC Industriales, national team).
- Big George Brock, 87, American blues harmonicist and singer.
- Olga Bucătaru, 78, Romanian actress, heart attack.
- Antonio Carro Martínez, 96, Spanish politician, Minister of the Presidency (1974–1975), member of the Congress of Deputies (1982–1989).
- Rifat Chadirji, 93, Iraqi architect, COVID-19.
- David Cohen, 102, American soldier, COVID-19.
- Oscar Cohen, 91, American music business executive and agent.
- Lucie Dolène, 88, Syrian-born French actress and singer.
- Walter D'Souza, 93, Indian cricketer (Gujarat).
- Mary Jane Fate, 86, American Athabaskan tribal leader.
- Nicholas Fernando, 87, Sri Lankan Roman Catholic prelate, Archbishop of Colombo (1977–2002).
- Frits Flinkevleugel, 80, Dutch footballer (national team, FC Amsterdam, DWS).
- Samuel Hargress II, 84, American bar owner, COVID-19.
- Shanti Hiranand, 87, Indian classical singer.
- Ceybil Jefferies, American house and R&B singer ("It's Gonna Be Alright"), COVID-19. (death announced on this day)
- Teijo Khan, 64, American professional wrestler (AWA).
- Ronald J. Kurth, 88, American rear admiral, government expert on Russian policy and study.
- K. Gordon Lark, 89, American biologist, prostate cancer.
- James P. Lucas, 93, American politician.
- Marianne Lundquist, 88, Swedish Olympic swimmer (1948, 1952), COVID-19.
- Jymie Merritt, 93, American jazz bassist (The Jazz Messengers), liver cancer.
- Enrique Múgica, 88, Spanish lawyer and politician, Minister of Justice (1988–1991), Deputy (1977–2000) and Ombudsman (2000–2010), COVID-19.
- Bas Mulder, 88, Dutch-Surinamese priest, COVID-19.
- Nobuhiko Obayashi, 82, Japanese film director (House, Toki o Kakeru Shōjo, Hanagatami), screenwriter and editor, lung cancer.
- Jacob Plange-Rhule, 62, Ghanaian physician, Rector of the Ghana College of Physicians and Surgeons (since 2015), COVID-19.
- Marcel Rainaud, 80, French politician, Senator (2006–2014).
- Marke Raines, 93, Canadian politician, MP (1974–1979).
- Pete Retzlaff, 88, American football player and executive (Philadelphia Eagles).
- Francis Reusser, 77, Swiss film director (The Big Night, Derborence, War in the Highlands).
- Diane Rodriguez, 68, American actress (Terminator 2: Judgment Day, La Bamba, Psycho III), cancer.
- Cecil C. Rousseau, 82, American mathematician and author.
- Carlo Sabatini, 88, Italian actor (Strangled Lives) and voice actor.
- Ing Yoe Tan, 71, Dutch politician, Senator (1999–2011).
- Abigail Thernstrom, 83, American political scientist.
- Pino van Lamsweerde, 79, Italian-Canadian animator and film director (Heavy Metal), COVID-19.
- Hans Verhagen, 81, Dutch journalist, poet and painter.
- Roy Watson, 86, Australian cricketer (Western Australia).
- Tom Webster, 71, Canadian ice hockey player (Detroit Red Wings, New England Whalers) and coach (Los Angeles Kings), brain cancer.
- Alf Wood, 74, English footballer (Shrewsbury Town, Millwall).
- Iris M. Zavala, 83, Puerto Rican author, independence activist and intellectual, COVID-19.

=== 11 ===
- Philip Appleman, 94, American poet and writer.
- Mel Baggs, 39, American autism blogger, respiratory failure.
- Simon Barrington-Ward, 89, English Anglican clergyman, Bishop of Coventry (1985–1997), COVID-19.
- Michael Bowden, 73, Australian footballer (Richmond), motor neurone disease.
- Colby Cave, 25, Canadian ice hockey player (Boston Bruins, Edmonton Oilers), complications from intracerebral hemorrhage.
- Hélène Châtelain, 84, Belgian-born French actress (La Jetée), documentary film director and writer.
- Stanley Chera, 77, American real estate executive, COVID-19.
- Bo Christensen, 82, Danish film producer.
- John Horton Conway, 82, English mathematician (Conway's Game of Life, surreal numbers, monstrous moonshine), COVID-19.
- Justus Dahinden, 94, Swiss architect, teacher and writer.
- Mariano De Nicolò, 88, Italian Roman Catholic prelate, Bishop of San Marino-Montefeltro (1989–1995) and Rimini (1989–2007).
- Murray Dorin, 65, Canadian politician.
- Keith Ferrell, 66, American author, heart failure.
- Paul Haddad, 56, English-born Canadian actor (Babar, John Callahan's Quads!, Resident Evil 2), throat cancer.
- Alfred Hagn, 72, German Olympic alpine skier (1968, 1972).
- Wynn Handman, 97, American artistic director (The American Place Theatre), COVID-19.
- Margot Hartman, 86, American actress (The Curse of the Living Corpse, Violent Midnight, Voyage to the Planet of Prehistoric Women).
- Kristin Jacobs, 60, American politician, mayor of Broward County (2012–2013) and member of the Florida House of Representatives (since 2014), colon cancer.
- Ezekiel Kalipeni, 66, Malawian geographer.
- Edem Kodjo, 81, Togolese politician, Prime Minister (1994–1996, 2005–2006) and Chairperson of the African Union Commission (1978–1983).
- Periklis Korovesis, 78, Greek journalist and politician, MP (2007–2009).
- Linda Larason, 72, American politician, complications from multiple myeloma.
- Liu Dehai, 82, Chinese pipa player.
- Ruth Mandel, 81, Austrian-born American political scientist, women's advocate and Holocaust survivor, ovarian cancer.
- Might and Power, 26, New Zealand-bred Australian racehorse, Melbourne Cup (1997), Caulfield Cup (1997) and W. S. Cox Plate (1998) winner.
- Muid Latif, 41, Malaysian fashion designer.
- Garth Owen-Smith, 76, Namibian environmentalist, cancer.
- Luciano Pellicani, 81, Italian sociologist and journalist.
- Lenore L. Prather, 88, American jurist, Justice (1982–2001) and Chief Justice (1998–2001) of the Supreme Court of Mississippi.
- Lowell A. Reed Jr., 89, American jurist, Judge of the U.S. District Court for East Pennsylvania (since 1988), complications from Parkinson's disease.
- Gus Rodríguez, 61, Mexican writer, director and video game journalist, lung cancer.
- Francis Tombs, Baron Tombs, 95, English industrialist and politician, member of the House of Lords (1990–2015).
- Alojz Uran, 75, Slovenian Roman Catholic prelate, Auxiliary Bishop (1992–2004) and Archbishop of Ljubljana (2004–2009).
- Mansukh C. Wani, 95, Indian-born American organic chemist.
- Arne Wilhelmsen, 90, Norwegian businessman, co-founder of Royal Caribbean Cruises.
- Gillian Wise, 84, British artist.
- Yorifusa Yamaguchi, Japanese filmmaker.

=== 12 ===
- Farouk Abu Issa, 86, Sudanese politician, Minister of Foreign Affairs (1969–1971).
- Francisco Aritmendi, 81, Spanish Olympic long-distance runner (1964), International Cross Country Champion (1964), COVID-19.
- Brian Arrowsmith, 79, English football player (Barrow) and manager, COVID-19.
- Eliyahu Bakshi-Doron, 78, Israeli rabbi and convicted fraudster, Rishon LeZion (1993–2003), COVID-19.
- Camillo Ballin, 75, Italian Roman Catholic prelate, Apostolic Vicar of Northern Arabia (since 2001).
- Maurice Barrier, 87, French actor and comedian (The Tall Blond Man with One Black Shoe, Les Compères, Les Fugitifs), COVID-19.
- Victor Batista Falla, 87, Cuban publisher and editor, COVID-19.
- Claude Beauchamp, 80, Canadian journalist, publisher and political activist.
- Glenn Beckert, 79, American baseball player (Chicago Cubs, San Diego Padres).
- Mary Begoña, 95, Spanish vedette and actress.
- Axel Berg, 81, Norwegian footballer.
- Elisabeth Berge, 65, Norwegian businesswoman and civil servant.
- Peter Bonetti, 78, English footballer (Chelsea, Dundee United, national team), world champion (1966).
- Tim Brooke-Taylor, 79, English comedian (The Goodies) and panellist (I'm Sorry I Haven't a Clue), COVID-19.
- Daniel Camiade, 80, French rugby union player (US Quillan, national team).
- Chung Won-shik, 91, South Korean politician, Prime Minister (1991–1992), kidney disease.
- Jacques De Decker, 74, Belgian writer and author, COVID-19.
- Louis van Dijk, 78, Dutch pianist, cancer.
- Ted Evans, 79, Australian public servant, Secretary of the Department of the Treasury (1993–2001).
- Toussaint Fouda, 61, Cameroonian Olympic road cyclist (1980).
- Caro Fraser, 67, British novelist, cancer.
- Jim Frey, 88, American baseball manager (Kansas City Royals, Chicago Cubs).
- Keiji Fujiwara, 55, Japanese voice actor (Fullmetal Alchemist, Kingdom Hearts, Attack on Titan), cancer.
- Danny Goldman, 80, American actor (The Smurfs, M*A*S*H, Young Frankenstein), stroke.
- Sascha Hupmann, 49, German basketball player (Evansville Aces, Panathinaikos, national team), ataxia.
- Tarvaris Jackson, 36, American football player (Minnesota Vikings, Seattle Seahawks, Buffalo Bills), traffic collision.
- Mikko Kaasalainen, 55, Finnish mathematician.
- Lyle Kahl, 80, Canadian educator and politician.
- James F. Keane, 85, American politician.
- Bill Langille, 76, Canadian politician, MLA (1999–2006), liver cancer.
- Adrian Lucaci, 53, Romanian footballer (Sportul Studențesc București).
- Abdul Majed, Bangladeshi military officer and convicted murderer (Jail Killing), execution by hanging.
- André Manaranche, 93, French Jesuit priest and theologian, COVID-19.
- Jacques Maury, 99, French pastor.
- Boo McLee, 36, American football player (Wheeling Wildcats).
- Rubén Menini, 96, Argentine basketball player (1948, 1952).
- Gavin Menzies, 82, British submarine lieutenant commander and author.
- Charles Miossec, 81, French politician, Deputy (1978–2002).
- Sir Stirling Moss, 90, British Hall of Fame racing driver.
- Jon Ola Norbom, 96, Norwegian economist and politician, leader of the Young Liberals (1950–1952) and Minister of Finance (1972–1973).
- Joe Pedicino, 70, American professional wrestling ring announcer (WCW).
- Ahfazur Rahman, 78, Pakistani journalist.
- Joel M. Reed, 86, American film director, producer and screenwriter (The G.I. Executioner, Blood Sucking Freaks, Night of the Zombies), COVID-19.
- Jaime Ruiz Sacristán, 70, Mexican business executive, chairman of the Mexican Stock Exchange (since 2015), COVID-19.
- Hugh Sackett, 91, British archaeologist.
- Doug Sanders, 86, American professional golfer.
- Milton Schafer, 99, American composer.
- Carlos Seco Serrano, 96, Spanish historian, member of the Royal Academy of History (since 1978), COVID-19.
- Charles Alexander Shaw, 75, American jurist, Judge of the U.S. District Court for Eastern Missouri (since 1993).
- Vasily Sidorov, 75, Russian diplomat, Permanent Representative to the United Nations Office at Geneva (1997–2001).
- Khalif Mumin Tohow, Somali justice minister of Hirshabelle State, COVID-19.
- Josephat Torner, 42, Tanzanian albino activist, traffic collision.
- Paulino Wanawilla Unango, South Sudanese politician, minister of justice and constitutional affairs (2013–2020).
- Samuel Wembé, 73, Cameroonian businessman and politician, COVID-19.
- Dennis Yamada, 75, American politician, member of the Hawaii House of Representatives (1971–1983).
- Yu Mingfang, 92, Chinese engineer.

=== 13 ===
- Baldiri Alavedra, 76, Spanish footballer (Sabadell), COVID-19.
- Gil Bailey, 84, Jamaican radio broadcaster, COVID-19.
- William H. Bailey, 89, American artist.
- Jacques Blamont, 93, French astrophysicist.
- E. S. Campbell, 98, American soldier (World War II).
- David Corbett, 79, English footballer (Swindon Town, Plymouth Argyle).
- Juan Cotino, 70, Spanish businessman and politician, President of Valencian Courts (2011–2014) and Director General of the National Police (1996–2002), COVID-19.
- John Dennis, 88, British prelate, Bishop of Knaresborough (1979–1986) and St Edmundsbury and Ipswich (1986–1996).
- Ashok Desai, 77, Indian lawyer, Attorney General (1996–1998) and Solicitor General (1989–1990).
- Alain Duret, 84, French writer.
- Jens Erik Fenstad, 84, Norwegian mathematician, COVID-19.
- David Giralt, 60, Cuban Olympic long jump athlete (1980).
- Jerry Givens, 67, American chief executioner of Virginia (1982–1999) and anti-death penalty advocate, COVID-19.
- Glenna Goodacre, 80, American sculptor (Sacagawea dollar, Vietnam Women's Memorial).
- Barbara Gorgoń, 84, Polish Olympic luger (1964).
- Karen Harper, 75, American author.
- Charlie Harrison, 70, American college basketball coach (East Carolina, New Mexico).
- Pannya Jota Mahathera, 64, Bangladeshi Theravada Buddhist monk, cardiac arrest.
- Suad Karajica, 60, Bosnian Olympic luger (1984).
- Ryo Kawasaki, 73, Japanese jazz fusion guitarist and composer.
- Shay Keogh, 85, Irish footballer (Shamrock Rovers).
- Thomas Kunz, 81, American zoologist, COVID-19.
- Landelino Lavilla, 85, Spanish politician, President of the Congress of Deputies (1979–1982), Minister of Justice (1976–1979) and member of the Council of State (since 1983).
- Philippe Lécrivain, 78, French Catholic priest (Society of Jesus), COVID-19.
- Peter Madden, 85, English football player (Rotherham United) and manager (Darlington, Rochdale).
- Vicente Magsaysay, 80, Filipino politician, Governor of Zambales (1968–1986, 1998–2007).
- Sarah Maldoror, 90, French documentary film director (Sambizanga), COVID-19.
- Patricia Millardet, 63, French actress (La Boum 2, P'tit Con, La piovra), heart attack.
- Moraes Moreira, 72, Brazilian guitarist and singer (Novos Baianos), heart attack.
- Benjamin Muckenhoupt, 86, American mathematician.
- Dennis G. Peters, 82, American electrochemist, COVID-19.
- Avrohom Pinter, 71, British rabbi and politician, Hackney Borough councillor (1982–1990), COVID-19.
- M. V. Rajasekharan, 91, Indian politician, MP.
- John Rowlands, 73, English footballer (Stockport County, Barrow, Workington), COVID-19.
- Javier Santamaría, 69, Spanish politician, Senator (2011–2015), president of the Segovia province (2003–2011) and mayor of Abades (1991–1996), COVID-19.
- Zafar Sarfraz, 50, Pakistani cricketer (Peshawar), COVID-19.
- Lansdale Ghiselin Sasscer Jr., 93, American politician.
- Bernard Stalter, 63, French entrepreneur and politician, member of the Regional Council of Grand Est (since 2016) and the ESEC (since 2015), COVID-19.
- Peggy Sullivan, 90, American librarian, president of the American Library Association (1980–1981).
- Ann Sullivan, 91, American animator (The Lion King, The Little Mermaid, Atlantis: The Lost Empire), COVID-19.

=== 14 ===
- Pip Baker, 91, British screenwriter (Doctor Who), complications from a fall.
- Haydar Baş, 73, Turkish politician, founder and leader of the Independent Turkey Party (since 2002), COVID-19.
- Paul Bayvel, 71, South African rugby union player (Transvaal, national team), cancer.
- Nate Brooks, 86, American boxer, Olympic champion (1952).
- John Collins, 71, Welsh footballer (Portsmouth, Halifax Town, Barnsley).
- Helen Damico, 89, Greek-born American literary scholar, COVID-19.
- Miguel Ángel D'Annibale, 61, Argentine Roman Catholic prelate, Bishop of Río Gallegos (2013–2018) and San Martín (since 2018), leukaemia.
- Danny Delaney, Irish Gaelic footballer (Laois, Stradbally), COVID-19.
- Joan Dewhirst, 84–85, British figure skater.
- Mario Donatone, 86, Italian actor (Phenomena, The Godfather Part III, John Wick: Chapter 2).
- Sir Roger Du Boulay, 98, British diplomat.
- Akin Euba, 84, Nigerian musician.
- Vincenzo Fardella, 93, Italian Olympic ice hockey player.
- Margit Feldman, 90, Hungarian-American educator, activist, and Holocaust survivor, COVID-19.
- John Forester, 90, American industrial engineer and cycling activist.
- Ed Genson, 78, American attorney (R. Kelly, Rod Blagojevich, Conrad Black), bile duct cancer.
- William H. Gerdts, 91, American art historian, COVID-19.
- Michael Gilkes, 86, Guyanese writer, COVID-19.
- Judith Innes, 78, American planning theorist, lymphoma.
- Jon Kilgore, 76, American football player (Los Angeles Rams).
- Cyril Lawrence, 99, English footballer (Rochdale, Wrexham), COVID-19.
- John Lee, 92, British politician, MP (1966–1970, 1974–1979).
- Barry Mason, 72, British lutenist and guitarist.
- Kerstin Meyer, 92, Swedish mezzo-soprano.
- Aldo di Cillo Pagotto, 70, Brazilian Roman Catholic prelate, Bishop of Sobral (1998–2004) and Archbishop of Paraíba (2004–2016), COVID-19.
- Dean Parker, 72, New Zealand screenwriter, journalist and political commentator.
- Luis Parodi, 83, Ecuadorian engineer and politician, Vice President (1988–1992).
- Igor Petrov, 86, Russian naval officer and academic.
- Peter Phoenix, 83, English footballer (Oldham Athletic, Rochdale, Stockport County).
- Ignacio Pichardo Pagaza, 84, Mexican politician, Governor of the State of Mexico (1989–1993) and President of the Institutional Revolutionary Party (1994), complications from surgery.
- Markus Raetz, 78, Swiss painter, sculptor, and illustrator.
- C. S. Rao, 84, Indian screenwriter (Pranam Khareedu, Sarada Ramudu).
- Gordon Ropp, 87, American politician.
- Sir Hugh Rossi, 92, British politician, MP (1966–1992) and Minister for Social Security (1981–1983).
- Namık Kemal Şentürk, 97, Turkish politician.
- Maria de Sousa, 80, Portuguese immunologist, COVID-19.
- Hank Steinbrenner, 63, American sports executive, co-owner of the New York Yankees (since 2008), liver ailment.
- Ella King Russell Torrey, 94, American human rights activist, COVID-19.
- Jimmy Webb, 62, American clothing stylist and merchandiser (Trash and Vaudeville), cancer.
- Peter Whiteside, 67, British Olympic modern pentathlete (1980), COVID-19.
- Billy Wright, 89, English footballer (Blackpool, Leicester City).
- Ron Wylie, 86, Scottish football player (Notts County, Aston Villa, Birmingham City) and manager.
- Kenny Young, 79, American songwriter ("Under the Boardwalk", "Ai No Corrida", "Captain of Your Ship"), producer and environmentalist, cancer.

=== 15 ===
- Adam Alsing, 51, Swedish television and radio presenter (Big Brother, Adam Live, Mix Megapol), COVID-19.
- Sean Arnold, 79, English actor (Grange Hill, Bergerac).
- Barbara Assoon, 91, Trinidadian actress.
- Ülkü Azrak, 86, Turkish lawyer and academic, COVID-19.
- John Briggs, 90, American politician, California State Assemblyman (1967–1977) and State Senator (1977–1981).
- Joe Brown, 89, English mountaineer.
- John Buchanan, 86, American Episcopal bishop of West Missouri (1990–1999).
- Ranjit Chowdhry, 64, Indian actor (Bollywood/Hollywood, Last Holiday, The Office), complications from a ruptured ulcer.
- Eddie Cooley, 87, American songwriter ("Fever") and singer ("Priscilla").
- Allen Daviau, 77, American cinematographer (E.T. the Extra-Terrestrial, The Color Purple, Empire of the Sun), COVID-19.
- Willie Davis, 85, American Hall of Fame football player (Cleveland Browns, Green Bay Packers).
- Bernard Deconinck, 83, French track cyclist, amateur world motor-paced silver medallist (1959).
- Brian Dennehy, 81, American actor (First Blood, Death of a Salesman, Silverado), Tony winner (1999, 2003), cardiac arrest due to sepsis.
- James Doyle, 87, Canadian politician.
- Rubem Fonseca, 94, Brazilian fiction writer.
- James Foort, 98, Canadian inventor and artist.
- Dámaso García, 63, Dominican baseball player (Toronto Blue Jays, Montreal Expos) and footballer (national team).
- Lee Gates, 82, American blues guitarist, singer and songwriter.
- Henry Grimes, 84, American jazz musician, COVID-19.
- Dries Holten, 84, Dutch singer (Rosy & Andres) and songwriter ("Sausalito").
- Sir John Houghton, 88, Welsh atmospheric physicist, COVID-19.
- Dick Hyde, 91, American baseball player (Washington Senators, Baltimore Orioles).
- Milena Jelinek, 84, Czech-American screenwriter (Forgotten Light), COVID-19.
- Lee Konitz, 92, American jazz composer and alto saxophonist, COVID-19.
- Finau Mara, 60, Fijian diplomat and politician, Ambassador-at-large (since 2001).
- Alfonso Marquez, 82, Filipino Olympic basketball player (1960, 1968).
- Gary McSpadden, 77, American gospel singer (The Imperials, Gaither Vocal Band), pastor and television host, pancreatic cancer.
- Eric Mergenthaler, 56, Mexican Olympic sailor (1984, 1988, 1992), and world champion (1992), bicycle accident.
- Aldo Mongiano, 100, Italian-born Brazilian Roman Catholic prelate, Bishop of Roraima (1979–1996), complications from a broken femur.
- Gérard Mulumba Kalemba, 82, Congolese Roman Catholic prelate, Bishop of Mweka (1989–2017), COVID-19.
- Bruce Myers, 78, British actor (The Unbearable Lightness of Being, Let There Be Light, Le Petit Lieutenant), COVID-19.
- Stephanie Neuman, 88, American political scientist, spinal cancer.
- John Pfahl, 81, American photographer, COVID-19.
- Ann Sayer, 83, English long-distance walker and rower.
- Shahin Shahablou, 56, Iranian photographer, COVID-19.
- Siamak Shayeghi, 65, Iranian film director and producer, cancer.
- George Curtis Smith, 84, American jurist, Judge of the U.S. District Court for Southern Ohio (since 1987).
- Vesa Törnroos, 37, Finnish Olympic sports shooter (2016), cancer.
- Dorick M. Wright, 74, Belizean Roman Catholic prelate, Bishop of Belize City-Belmopan (2006–2017).
- Rustam Zakirov, 30, Kyrgyz footballer (FC Abdysh-Ata Kant, FC Alga Bishkek).

=== 16 ===
- Srilal Abeykoon, 66, Sri Lankan actor and singer (Kopi Kade).
- Abdennour Abrous, 85, Algerian politician.
- Joseph Adler, 79, American theatre and film director (Scream, Baby, Scream).
- Rosemary De Angelis, 86, American actress (Law & Order, Frequency, The Juror).
- Christophe, 74, French singer-songwriter ("Aline"), COPD.
- Gene Deitch, 95, American-born Czech illustrator, animator (Munro, Tom Terrific, Nudnik) and comics artist.
- Francesco Di Carlo, 79, Italian mobster (Sicilian Mafia) and pentito, COVID-19.
- Seena Donneson, 95, American sculptor.
- Andrew J. Fenady, 91, American screenwriter, producer, and actor (Stakeout on Dope Street, The Young Captives).
- Howard Finkel, 69, American Hall of Fame professional wrestling ring announcer (WWE).
- Luiz Alfredo Garcia-Roza, 83, Brazilian professor and writer.
- Kenneth Gilbert, 88, Canadian harpsichordist, organist and music educator.
- Victor Hendrix, 84, German Olympic rower (1960).
- Danièle Hoffman-Rispal, 68, French politician, Deputy (2002–2012).
- Walter Hoover, 85, American Olympic rower (1952).
- Jane Dee Hull, 84, American politician, Governor of Arizona (1997–2003) and Secretary of State (1995–1997).
- Herbert Jones, 91, Welsh footballer (Wrexham).
- Bashir Khanbhai, 74, Tanzanian-born British politician.
- Ulrich Kienzle, 83, German author and journalist (ARD, ZDF).
- Brian Kyme, 84, Australian Anglican prelate, Assistant Bishop of Perth (1982–1999), cancer.
- Santiago Lanzuela, 71, Spanish politician, President of the Government of Aragon (1995–1999), COVID-19.
- Jean-Marie Luton, 77, French aerospace engineer, Director General of the European Space Agency (1990–1997).
- Althea McNish, 95, Trinidadian-British textile designer.
- Henry Miller, 89, American lawyer and jurist, COVID-19.
- Bojana Milošević, 54, Serbian-Yugoslavian basketball player, Olympic silver medallist (1988).
- Bruce Murray, 90, Australian footballer (South Melbourne) and cricketer (Victoria).
- Phoenix Netts, 28, British murder victim, stabbed.
- Arne Nilsen, 96, Norwegian politician, Minister of Local Government (1978–1979) and Social Affairs (1979–1981).
- William Pulgram, 99, Austrian-born American architect.
- Ben Raimondi, 95, American football player (New York Yankees).
- Tal Rutledge, 91, American civil rights activist.
- Luis Sepúlveda, 70, Chilean writer and journalist, COVID-19.
- Shamardal, 18, American-bred British racehorse and sire.
- Glider Ushñahua, 51, Peruvian lawyer and politician, Congressman (2016–2019), pneumonia.
- Jack Wallace, 86, American actor (Death Wish, Eagleheart, Boogie Nights).
- Bohumír Zháňal, 88, Czech Olympic athlete (1960).

=== 17 ===
- Bennie G. Adkins, 86, American army Green Beret and intelligence sergeant major, Medal of Honor recipient, COVID-19.
- Barney Ales, 85, American record label executive (Motown).
- Annette Auguste, 79–80, Haitian folk singer and activist.
- Deirdre Bair, 84, American writer and biographer, heart failure.
- James G. Baker, 81, American politician, COVID-19.
- Jean-François Bazin, 77, French politician and writer.
- Bryan Berteaux, 75, American photographer.
- Carlos Contreras, 81, Chilean footballer (Universidad de Chile, national team).
- Georges Cukierman, 93, French resistance member and communist activist.
- Paolo Curcetti, 83, Italian Olympic boxer (1960).
- Filipe Duarte, 46, Portuguese actor (Belmonte, Variações, Amor de Mãe), heart attack.
- George Curtis, 96, English greyhound trainer.
- Sergio Fantoni, 89, Italian actor (Von Ryan's Express, Esther and the King, The Manageress).
- Mohiuddin Faroque, 79, Bangladeshi art director.
- Gilbert Garcin, 90, French photographer.
- Joseph Guiraud, 91, French rugby league player (national team).
- Ali Suleman Habib, 63, Pakistani businessman, Chairman of Toyota Indus (since 2009).
- Allan Heyl, South African bank robber (Stander Gang).
- Norman Hunter, 76, English football player (Leeds United, Bristol City, national team) and manager, world champion (1966), COVID-19.
- Patricia Kailis, 86, Australian businesswoman, geneticist and neurologist.
- Abba Kyari, 67, Nigerian politician, Chief of Staff to the President (since 2015), COVID-19.
- Giuseppi Logan, 84, American jazz musician, COVID-19.
- Domenico Lo Vasco, 91, Italian politician.
- Iris Love, 86, American archaeologist and dog breeder, COVID-19.
- Lukman Niode, 56, Indonesian Olympic swimmer (1984), COVID-19.
- Hezakiah Oshutapik, 63, Canadian politician, MLA (2011–2013), heart attack.
- Loyal K. Park, 89, American baseball player and college athletics coach.
- Max Quackenbush, 91, Canadian ice hockey player (Chicago Blackhawks, Boston Bruins).
- Arlene Saunders, 89, American operatic soprano, COVID-19.
- Matthew Seligman, 64, English new wave bassist (The Soft Boys, Thompson Twins), complications from COVID-19.
- Robin Seymour, 94, American disc jockey (CKLW, WKNR) and television host (Swingin' Time, Teen Town).
- Gene Shay, 85, American disc jockey (WXPN), co-founder of Philadelphia Folk Festival, COVID-19.
- Daya Thennakoon, 79, Sri Lankan actor (Visidela, Bambaru Avith).
- Sir Alan Traill, 84, British businessman, Lord Mayor of London (1984–1985).
- Raymond Van Gestel, 90, Belgian footballer (K. Lyra, Verbroedering Geel, national team).
- Jesús Vaquero, 70, Spanish neurosurgeon, COVID-19.
- Bobby Winkles, 90, American Hall of Fame baseball coach (Arizona State Sun Devils) and manager (California Angels, Oakland Athletics).
- Tommy Woods, 86, American politician, Mississippi state representative (1988–2012).

=== 18 ===
- Takuo Aoyagi, 84, Japanese engineer and inventor (pulse oximetry).
- Barbara A. Babcock, 81, American legal scholar, cancer.
- Erik Belfrage, 74, Swedish diplomat and banking executive, COVID-19.
- Aurelio Campa, 86, Spanish footballer (Real Madrid).
- Ratnakar Chaini, 74, Indian writer and academic.
- Virender Lal Chopra, 83, Indian geneticist and agronomist, director-general of the Indian Council of Agricultural Research (1992–1994).
- Leighton Cooney, 76, American politician.
- Albert Côté, 93, Canadian politician.
- Sue Davies, 87, British gallery director (The Photographers' Gallery).
- Amparo Dávila, 92, Mexican writer.
- Terry Doran, 80, British music manager (Grapefruit).
- Gulshan Ewing, 92, Indian journalist, COVID-19.
- William Foley, 93, American painter.
- Jim Fraser, 83, American football player (Denver Broncos), COVID-19.
- Gangchen Tulku Rinpoche, 78, Tibetan Buddhist monk, COVID-19.
- Allan Gotlieb, 92, Canadian public servant, Ambassador to the United States (1981–1989), cancer and Parkinson's disease.
- Eva Konrad Hawkins, 90, Hungarian-born American biologist, COVID-19.
- Loïc Hennekinne, 79, French diplomat and government official.
- Lennart Jirlow, 83, Swedish painter and scenographer.
- Tariq Pervez Khan, 72, Pakistani judge, Chief Justice of the Peshawar High Court.
- Sékou Kourouma, 63–64, Guinean politician and political aide, Chief of Staff to President Alpha Condé, COVID-19.
- François Lafortune Jr., 87, Belgian rifle shooter, seven-time Olympic competitor (1952–1976), Parkinson's disease.
- Helen M. Laird, 89, Scottish electron microscopist.
- Bob Lazier, 81, American racing driver (CART), COVID-19.
- Jack Lotz, 86, American professional wrestling referee (WWF) and stuntman (Raging Bull, The Siege), COVID-19.
- Lawrence E. Lucas, 86, American Catholic priest.
- Edward Millward, 89, Welsh nationalist and educator (Charles, Prince of Wales).
- Urano Navarrini, 74, Italian footballer, COVID-19.
- Paul H. O'Neill, 84, American politician, Secretary of the Treasury (2001–2002), lung cancer.
- Anne Priestley, 87, American politician, member of the New Hampshire House of Representatives.
- Willy Quadackers, 82, Dutch footballer (Fortuna '54, MVV Maastricht, national team).
- W. Allyn Rickett, 98, American historian.
- Jacques Rosny, 81, French actor (The Tenant, Catherine & Co., L.627), COVID-19.
- André Roumieux, 87, French nurse.
- Claude Silberzahn, 85, French civil servant, Mayor of Simorre (2001–2014), Director of the Directorate-General for External Security (1989–1993).
- Bernice Silver, 106, American puppeteer and activist, complications from COVID-19.
- Robert Kimmel Smith, 89, American author.
- Dick Steinborn, 86, American professional wrestler.
- Lucien Szpiro, 78, French mathematician (Szpiro's conjecture), heart failure.
- Emma Weigley, 87, American nutritionist, complications from COVID-19.
- Gayraud Wilmore, 98, American historian, writer and theologian.

=== 19 ===
- Marat Aleksanian, 70, Armenian politician, Minister of Justice (1996–1998).
- Edmond Baraffe, 77, French football player (Toulouse) and manager (Le Touquet).
- Peter Beard, 82, American photographer. (body discovered on this date)
- Cecil Bødker, 93, Danish writer.
- Stanislav Boyadzhiev, 74, Bulgarian Olympic basketball player (1968).
- Aileen Carroll, 75, Canadian politician, Minister for International Cooperation (2003–2006).
- Steve Dalkowski, 80, American baseball player, character inspiration for Bull Durham and The Scout, COVID-19 and dementia.
- Noach Dear, 66, American jurist, New York Supreme Court judge (since 2015), COVID-19.
- Hubert Deittert, 79, German politician, MP (1994–2009).
- Dickie Dowsett, 88, English footballer (Southend United, Bournemouth, Crystal Palace), complications from dementia.
- Peter Dronke, 85, German literary scholar and medievalist.
- Tex Earnhardt, 89, American entrepreneur.
- Hector Garrido, 92, Argentine-born American comic book artist.
- Kevin Gill, 58, English Olympic trap shooter (1992, 1996) and 1990 Commonwealth Games champion.
- John A. Gordon, 73, American public official, Deputy Director of the CIA (1997–2000), Under Secretary for Nuclear Security (2000–2002) and Homeland Security Advisor (2003–2004).
- Índio, 89, Brazilian footballer (Flamengo, Espanyol, national team).
- Sergio Onofre Jarpa, 99, Chilean politician, Senator (1973, 1990–1994) and Minister of the Interior (1983–1985), COVID-19.
- Aleksandr Kapto, 87, Ukrainian sociologist and diplomat.
- Claude Lafortune, 83, Canadian television presenter, sculptor and costume designer, COVID-19.
- Howard Lesnick, 88, American legal scholar.
- Darrell Lewis, 84, American football player and coach.
- Robert Loomis, 93, American book editor, complications from a fall.
- Pellom McDaniels, 52, American football player (Philadelphia Eagles, Kansas City Chiefs, Atlanta Falcons).
- Harry Müller, 89, German sculptor.
- Philippe Nahon, 81, French actor (High Tension, I Stand Alone, Calvaire).
- Hiroyuki Nakajo, 74, Japanese Olympic sport shooter (1984).
- Bob Oliver, 77, American baseball player (Kansas City Royals, California Angels, Pittsburgh Pirates).
- Renzo Ostino, 83, Italian Olympic rower (1960).
- Margit Otto-Crépin, 75, German-born French equestrian, Olympic silver medalist (1988).
- Sy Rogers, 63, American pastor and ex-gay movement activist, kidney cancer.
- Harvey Sabinson, 94, American theatrical press agent.
- Delphine Serina, 49, French actress (The Liars, On Guard, Tanguy), cancer.
- Milen Tsvetkov, 53, Bulgarian journalist, traffic collision.
- Alexander Vustin, 76, Russian composer, pneumonia.
- Ian Whitcomb, 78, English singer-songwriter ("You Turn Me On") and author.
- Emina Zečaj, 91, Bosnian sevdalinka singer.

=== 20 ===
- Heherson Alvarez, 80, Filipino politician, Senator (1987–1998), Congressman (1998–2001), Minister of Agrarian Reform (1986–1987), COVID-19.
- Roy Barker, 72, English cricketer (Worcestershire).
- Eric Berg, 74, American sculptor.
- Hein Bollow, 99, German jockey, stroke.
- Richard Boyce, 91, American Anglican bishop, Vicar General of the Diocese of Cascadia (2009–2011).
- H. G. Carrillo, 60, American writer and academic, complications from COVID-19.
- Peter Caws, 88, British-American philosopher.
- Libero Cecchini, 100, Italian architect.
- Alan Clough, 87, Australian footballer.
- Manuel da Costa, 93, Portuguese Olympic sports shooter (1964).
- Mike Curtis, 77, American football player (Baltimore Colts, Seattle Seahawks, Washington Redskins).
- Ken Dillen, 81, Canadian politician.
- Noureddine Diwa, 83, Tunisian footballer (Stade Tunisien, Limoges, national team).
- Claude Evrard, 86, French actor (Circus Angel, If the Sun Never Returns).
- Farit Ismeth Emir, 65, Malaysian news anchor (Radio Television Malaysia), lung cancer.
- Horacio Fontova, 73, Argentine singer, actor and comedian, cancer.
- Marie Rose Guiraud, 75, Ivorian dancer and choreographer.
- Zac Henderson, 64, American football player (Philadelphia Eagles).
- Cliff Holden, 100, English painter, designer and silk screen printer.
- Jimmy Jordan, 75, American football player (New Orleans Saints).
- Tom Lester, 81, American actor (Green Acres, Benji, Gordy), complications from Parkinson's disease.
- Krystyna Łybacka, 74, Polish politician, Minister of National Education and Sport (2001–2004) and MEP (2014–2019).
- Sirio Maccioni, 88, Italian restaurateur and writer, founder of Le Cirque, complications from dementia.
- Tom Mulholland, 84, Irish Gaelic footballer (Kilkerley Emmets, Louth, Leinster), COVID-19.
- Ronan O'Rahilly, 79, Irish businessman, founder of Radio Caroline, vascular dementia.
- Gérard Piouffre, 74, French writer and historian.
- Gabriel Retes, 73, Mexican film director (Paper Flowers, Broken Flag, A Sweet Scent of Death).
- Manjeet Singh Riyat, 52, British emergency care consultant, COVID-19.
- Gertrude Rwakatare, 69, Tanzanian politician, MP (since 2007).
- Josep Sala Mañé, 82, Spanish casteller, founder of Castellers de Barcelona, COVID-19.
- Don Schultz, 83, American chess expert, presidents of the United States Chess Federation (1996–1999).
- Rudratej Singh, 46, Indian businessman, CEO of BMW India (since 2019), cardiac arrest.
- Jiří Toman, 81, Czech-born Swiss professor and jurist (International Criminal Tribunal for Rwanda).
- Arsen Yegiazarian, 49, Armenian chess grandmaster.

=== 21 ===
- Muhammad Afzal, 81, Pakistani Olympic wrestler (1964), COVID-19.
- Richard Akinjide, 89, Nigerian jurist, Minister of Justice (1979–1983).
- Dame Ingrid Allen, 87, Northern Irish neuropathologist.
- Dave Bacuzzi, 79, English football player (Arsenal, Manchester City, Reading) and manager, COVID-19.
- Belco Bah, 61–62, Malian politician, member of the National Assembly for Niono, COVID-19.
- Jonathan Bardon, 78, Irish historian and author, COVID-19.
- Koos van den Berg, 77, Dutch politician, MP (1986–2002), COVID-19.
- Jerry Bishop, 84, American announcer (Judge Judy), heart disease and kidney failure.
- José María Calleja, 64, Spanish journalist, political prisoner and anti-ETA activist, COVID-19.
- Ernest Courant, 100, American physicist.
- Dimitri Diatchenko, 52, American actor (Chernobyl Diaries, Spider-Man: Shattered Dimensions, Indiana Jones and the Kingdom of the Crystal Skull), heart attack.
- Fang Keli, 81, Chinese New Confucian philosopher.
- Richard Fenno, 93, American political scientist.
- Philip Foglia, 69, American lawyer and civic activist, advocate for Italian American rights issues, COVID-19.
- Tina Girouard, 73, American artist, stroke.
- Carleton Hoffner Jr., 88, American figure skater.
- Derek Jones, 35, American rock guitarist (Falling in Reverse), subdural hematoma.
- Abdurrahim El-Keib, 70, Libyan politician, acting Prime Minister (2011–2012), heart attack.
- Donald Kennedy, 88, American administrator, president of Stanford University (1980–1992), Commissioner of Food and Drugs (1977–1979), COVID-19.
- Eva Kolínská, 79, Czech Olympic canoeist (1960).
- Marcel Le Roy, 100, French resistance fighter.
- Liu Ping-wei, 67, Taiwanese politician, MLY (1999–2002), oral cancer.
- Lewis MacAdams, 75, American conservationist, poet and artist, co-founder of FoLAR, complications from Parkinson's disease.
- Norm Nielsen, 86, American magician.
- Teruyuki Okazaki, 88, Japanese karate master, founder of the International Shotokan Karate Federation, COVID-19.
- Jacques Pellen, 63, French jazz guitarist, COVID-19.
- Gerson Peres, 88, Brazilian politician, lawyer and journalist, Vice Governor of Pará (1979–1983), member of the Chamber of Deputies (1983–2003, 2007–2011), COVID-19.
- Laisenia Qarase, 79, Fijian politician, Prime Minister (2000–2001, 2001–2006).
- Teresa Rodrigo, 93, Spanish scientist (CERN, Fermilab).
- Joel Rogosin, 87, American television producer (The Virginian, Ironside, Magnum, P.I.), COVID-19.
- Florian Schneider, 73, German electronic musician (Kraftwerk), cancer.
- Anthony Senecal, 78, American butler (Mar-a-Lago) and politician, Mayor of Martinsburg, West Virginia (1990–1992).
- Sharadchandra Shankar Shrikhande, 102, Indian mathematician, developer of Shrikhande graph.
- Milt Sunde, 78, American football player (Minnesota Vikings), complications from Parkinson's and Alzheimer's diseases.
- Jack Taylor, 84, American politician, member of the Colorado Senate (2000–2008) and House of Representatives (1992–2000), COVID-19.
- Miguel Ángel Troitiño, 72–73, Spanish geographer, COVID-19.
- Alan Williams, 84, British writer.
- Esteban Yáñez, 35, Spanish actor, musician and blogger, COVID-19.
- Shōmei Yokouchi, 78, Japanese politician, MP (1993–2002) and Governor of Yamanashi Prefecture (2007–2015).

=== 22 ===
- Sir Eric Anderson, 83, British educator, Headmaster (1980–1994) and Provost (2000–2009) of Eton College.
- Bootsie Barnes, 82, American jazz saxophonist, COVID-19.
- Wilfried de Beauclair, 108, Swiss-born German engineer.
- Zarbeg Beriashvili, 80, Georgian Olympic wrestler (1964, 1968).
- Sid Bishop, 86, English footballer (Leyton Orient).
- Dennis Copps, 91, British-born New Zealand cricket umpire.
- Marco D'Amico, 84, American mobster.
- Dave Fleming, 76, American CFL football player (Hamilton Tiger-Cats).
- Samantha Fox, 69, American pornographic film actress, cardiovascular illness related to COVID-19.
- Terence Frisby, 87, English playwright (There's a Girl in My Soup) and actor.
- Hartwig Gauder, 65, German race walker, Olympic champion (1980), heart attack and kidney failure.
- Jimmy Goodfellow, 76, English football player (Workington, Rotherham United) and manager (Cardiff City).
- Oliver Gough, 84, Irish hurler (Rathnure, Wexford, Kilkenny).
- Louis Haché, 95, Canadian writer (Acadian literature).
- Rich Hacker, 72, American baseball player (Montreal Expos) and coach (St. Louis Cardinals, Toronto Blue Jays), leukemia.
- James Hoggan, 61, Australian Paralympic athlete.
- Saadat Husain, 73, Bangladeshi civil servant, Chairman of the Public Service Commission (2007–2011), kidney disease.
- Bart Johnson, 70, American baseball player (Chicago White Sox), complications from Parkinson's disease.
- Sir Peter Jonas, 73, British arts administrator and opera director.
- Mansour Khalid, 89, Sudanese politician, Foreign Minister (1971–1975, 1977).
- Shirley Knight, 83, American actress (The Dark at the Top of the Stairs, Sweet Bird of Youth, As Good as It Gets).
- Eva Kotthaus, 87, German actress.
- Dan Mazzulla, 61, American basketball player and coach, brain cancer.
- Marcos Mundstock, 77, Argentine musician, comedian and actor (Les Luthiers), brain tumor.
- Zoe Dell Nutter, 104, American dancer, model and philanthropist.
- John E. Otto, 81, American administrator, acting Director of the Federal Bureau of Investigation (1987).
- Catherine Paysan, 93, French writer.
- El Príncipe Gitano, 88, Spanish flamenco singer and actor, COVID-19.
- Julian Perry Robinson, 78, British chemist and peace researcher, COVID-19.
- Paul Ronty, 91, Canadian ice hockey player (New York Rangers, Boston Bruins).
- Edward Winchester, 49, Canadian lightweight rower, world champion (2000).

=== 23 ===
- Bruce Allpress, 89, New Zealand actor (Came a Hot Friday, The Lord of the Rings: The Two Towers, The Water Horse: Legend of the Deep), complications from amyotrophic lateral sclerosis.
- Al Angrisani, 70, American business consultant and author, complications from COVID-19.
- Pahri Azhari, 57, Indonesian politician, Regent of Musi Banyuasin (2008–2015), traffic collision.
- Albert Bateman, 95, English footballer (Huddersfield Town).
- Jean-Michel Beau, 76, French gendarme (Irish of Vincennes scandal).
- James M. Beggs, 94, American businessman, NASA Administrator (1981–1985).
- Norbert Blüm, 84, German politician, Federal Minister for Social Affairs and Labour (1982–1998).
- Arief Budiman, 79, Indonesian political activist and sociologist.
- Heda Čechová, 91, Czech anchorwoman and eventual politician, member of the Czech National Council (1990–1992).
- Chen Liangting, 91, Chinese translator.
- Lloyd deMause, 88, American sociologist and psychohistorian.
- Fred the Godson, 35, American DJ and rapper, COVID-19.
- Usha Ganguly, 75, Indian theatre director and actress, founder of Rangakarmee, cardiac arrest.
- Peter Gill, 89, English professional golfer, COVID-19.
- Brian Glendinning, 85, English footballer (Darlington).
- John Gregory, 95, English orchestra leader.
- Joan Hackshaw-Marslin, 69, Trinidadian politician, Senator (2002–2007).
- Sajid Hussain, 39, Pakistani Balochi journalist. (body discovered on this date)
- André Iuncker, 86, French Olympic boxer (1960).
- Jacques Kazadi, 83, Congolese economist, professor, and politician.
- Akira Kume, 96, Japanese actor (The Insect Woman, Tora-san's Sunrise and Sunset, The Resurrection of the Golden Wolf), heart failure.
- Terry Lenzner, 80, American lawyer and investigator, pneumonia.
- Bernardino Lombao, 81, Spanish athlete and businessman.
- Chris Marcus, 40, American college basketball player (Western Kentucky), pulmonary embolism.
- Alecos Markides, 77, Cypriot lawyer and politician, MP (1985–1995) and Attorney General (1995–2003).
- Patrick Leo McCartie, 94, British Roman Catholic prelate, Bishop of Northampton (1990–2001).
- John Murphy, 77, Scottish footballer (Ayr United).
- Kumiko Okae, 63, Japanese actress and television presenter, COVID-19.
- Henk Overgoor, 75, Dutch footballer (Go Ahead Eagles, De Graafschap), COVID-19.
- Charles Poots, 90, Northern Irish unionist politician, delegate to the Northern Ireland Constitutional Convention (1975–1976).
- Johnny Pyeatt, 86, American football player (Denver Broncos).
- Doug Robson, 77, English footballer (Darlington F.C.).
- Marvin Schick, 85, American political consultant and professor, heart attack.
- Janusz Symonides, 82, Polish diplomat, writer and jurist.
- Mary Tiffen, 88, British economic historian and scholar, COVID-19.
- Dan Walters, 53, American baseball player (San Diego Padres), complications of gunshot and traffic collision.
- Ernst Zägel, 84, German footballer (1. FC Saarbrücken, Saarland national team).

=== 24 ===
- Sir James Adams, 87, British diplomat, ambassador to Tunisia (1984–1987) and Egypt (1987–1992).
- Helene Aldwinckle, 99, English codebreaker.
- Ebrahim Amini, 94, Iranian politician, member of the Assembly of Experts (1983–2007, since 2016).
- Mark Beech, 60, British music critic, complications from a traffic collision.
- Hamilton Bohannon, 78, American percussionist, songwriter and record producer.
- Phil Broadhurst, 70, New Zealand jazz musician, composer and radio presenter.
- David Daniels, 86, American conductor and author.
- Lynn Faulds Wood, 72, Scottish television presenter (Watchdog) and journalist, stroke.
- Leo Goodstadt, 82, British-Hong Kong economist, Head of the Central Policy Unit (1989–1997).
- Grandma Lee, 85, American stand-up comedian.
- Roland Haché, 72, Canadian politician, MLA (1999–2014) and mayor of Petit-Rocher (1995–1999).
- Richard Hake, 51, American radio journalist (WNYC).
- Abdullah al-Hamid, 69, Saudi Arabian poet and human rights activist, co-founder of the Saudi Civil and Political Rights Association, stroke.
- Namio Harukawa, 72, Japanese fetish artist, cancer.
- Tiede Herrema, 99, Dutch businessman.
- Mike Huckaby, 54, American deep house and trance DJ, complications from stroke and COVID-19.
- Ray Jarvis, 73, American baseball player (Boston Red Sox).
- Mustafa Koçak, Turkish political prisoner, self-imposed starvation.
- John Lisnik, 73, American politician, Maine state representative (1980–1990).
- Mircea Mureșan, 91, Romanian film director (Răscoala, Blestemul pământului, blestemul iubirii).
- Ki Daophet Nouhouang, 47, Laotian singer.
- Yukio Okamoto, 74, Japanese diplomat and diplomatic analyst, COVID-19.
- Joseph S. Pulver Sr., 64, American writer, COPD.
- Burton Rose, 77, American nephrologist, COVID-19.
- Yaakov Schwei, 85, American Orthodox rabbi.
- Harry Sindle, 90, American Olympic sailor.
- Gerald Slater, 86, American television executive, COVID-19.
- Taneko Suzuki, 93, Japanese biochemist and nutritionist, colorectal cancer.
- Roger Tattersall, 68, English cricketer (Lancashire).
- Nic Tummers, 92, Dutch politician, Senator (1974–1995).
- Graeme Watson, 75, Australian cricketer (national team), cancer.
- Lee Roy West, 90, American jurist, Judge (since 1979) and Chief Judge (1993–1994) of the U.S. District Court for Western Oklahoma.
- Don Woan, 92, English footballer (Liverpool).

=== 25 ===
- Alan Abel, 91, American percussionist and music educator, COVID-19.
- India Adams, 93, American singer and actress.
- James B. Adams, 93, American politician and government official, Associate Director of the FBI (1973–1979).
- Doug Anakin, 89, Canadian bobsledder, Olympic champion (1964).
- Khandaker Asaduzzaman, 84, Bangladeshi politician, MP (1996–2001, 2008–2014), heart disease.
- Erin Babcock, 38, Canadian politician, MLA (2015–2019), uterine cancer.
- Vytautas Barkauskas, 89, Lithuanian composer.
- Peter Brancazio, 81, American sports scientist, COVID-19.
- Ricardo Brennand, 92, Brazilian building materials executive, real estate investor and art collector, founder of Ricardo Brennand Institute, COVID-19.
- Garland Cannon, 95, American linguist.
- Marino Casem, 85, American Hall of Fame football coach and administrator (Alcorn State, Southern).
- Richard Divila, 74, Brazilian motorsports designer, technical director of Fittipaldi Automotive (1975–1982).
- Liz Edgar, 76, British showjumper, cancer.
- Per Olov Enquist, 85, Swedish author (The Visit of the Royal Physician), cancer.
- Erwan Evenou, 80, French writer and activist for the Breton language.
- John W. Foss, 87, American general.
- Dick Frey, 90, American football player (Houston Oilers).
- Hansadutta Swami, 78, German-born American Gaudiya Vaishnava spiritual leader.
- Thomas Huang, 83, Chinese-born American computer scientist.
- Henri Kichka, 94, Belgian Holocaust survivor, COVID-19.
- Kim Chung-yum, 96, South Korean diplomat and politician, Minister of Finance (1966) and Industry (1967–1969), Chief of Staff to the President (1969–1979).
- Devanand Konwar, 77, Indian politician, Governor of West Bengal (2009–2010), Bihar (2009–2013) and Tripura (2013–2014).
- Madeline Kripke, 76, American book collector, COVID-19.
- Mahendra Kumar, 47, Indian political activist (Bajrang Dal), heart attack.
- Maurice LeClair, 92, Canadian physician, businessman, civil servant and academic.
- Robert Mandell, 90, American conductor, COVID-19.
- Robert Mezey, 85, American poet, pneumonia.
- Pat Nowlan, 88, Canadian politician.
- Karin Priester, 78, German historian and professor.
- Jack Scroby, 83, English rugby union and rugby league player (Bradford Bulls, Halifax) and coach (Huddersfield Giants).
- Gunnar Seijbold, 65, Swedish photographer, COVID-19.
- Abdulkarim Shah, 58, Tanzanian politician, MP.
- Les Stevens, 69, English boxer.
- Ravi Vallathol, 67, Indian actor (Mathilukal, Godfather, Dada Sahib).
- Rosemarie Wright, 88, English pianist.
- Yevgeny Yuryev, 69, Russian military officer and politician, commander of the 5th Air and Air Defence Forces Army (2001–2006).
- Zarina, 82, Indian-born American artist.

=== 26 ===
- Emilio Allué, 85, Spanish-born American Roman Catholic prelate, Auxiliary Bishop of Boston (1996–2010), COVID-19.
- Georges-Jean Arnaud, 91, French author.
- Tomás Balcázar, 88, Mexican footballer (Guadalajara, national team).
- Brian Barclay, 82, Australian footballer (Fitzroy).
- Laura Bernal, 64, Argentine diplomat (ambassador to Ireland), COVID-19.
- Lorna Breen, 49, American physician, suicide.
- Big Al Carson, 66, American blues singer, complications from heart attack.
- Giulietto Chiesa, 79, Italian journalist and politician, MEP (2004–2009).
- Guillermo Chifflet, 93, Uruguayan journalist and politician, Deputy (1989–2005) and co-founder of Frente Amplio.
- Tom Cross, 88, Australian Olympic fencer (1956).
- Conrad Dehn, 93, British barrister.
- Miquéias Fernandes, 69, Brazilian politician, COVID-19.
- Aarón Hernán, 89, Mexican actor (The Garden of Aunt Isabel, Apolinar, Deathstalker and the Warriors from Hell).
- Peter H. Hunt, 81, American theatre, film and television director (1776, Give 'em Hell, Harry!), complications from Parkinson's disease.
- Kauko Juhantalo, 77, Finnish politician, Minister of Trade and Industry (1991–1992), MP (1979–1993, 1995–1999, 2003–2007, 2015–2019), cancer.
- Nick Kotz, 87, American journalist and author, struck by own vehicle.
- Tamás Kovács, 79, Hungarian general and prosecutor, Chief Prosecutor of Hungary (2006–2010).
- Basil Lewis, 92, Jamaican-born British politician.
- Ron Marlenee, 84, American politician, member of the U.S. House of Representatives (1977–1993).
- Otto Mellies, 89, German theatre, film and voice actor (Hellas ohne Götter, According to the Plan, Stopped on Track).
- Bijay Mishra, 83, Indian lyricist and screenwriter.
- Marcel Ospel, 70, Swiss banker, Chairman of UBS (2001–2008).
- Jean-Claude Pertuzé, 70, French comic book artist and illustrator.
- Maurice Poli, 86, French actor (Rabid Dogs, Five Dolls for an August Moon, Tom Dollar).
- John Ernest Randall, 95, American ichthyologist.
- Carlos Regazzoni, 76, Argentine sculptor.
- Ray Repp, 77, American singer-songwriter, metastatic melanoma.
- Claudio Risi, 71, Italian film director (I ragazzi della 3ª C, Wedding in Paris), complications from a heart attack.
- Abolfazl Salabi, 95, Iranian Olympic basketball player (1948).
- Badruddin Shaikh, 67, Indian politician, COVID-19.
- Paul J. Smith, 88, American artist and curator, director of the Museum of Arts and Design (1963–1979).
- Uttam Bandu Tupe, 87, Indian writer and poet.
- Henri Weber, 75, French politician, Senator (1995–2004) and MEP (2004–2014), COVID-19.

=== 27 ===
- Barbara Allimadi, 48, Ugandan politician and human rights activist.
- Edean Anderson Ihlanfeldt, 90, American golfer.
- Lena Atti, 94, American Yup'ik artisan and craftswoman.
- Maryna Bazanova, 57, Russian handball player, Olympic bronze medallist (1988, 1992).
- Asdrubal Bentes, 80, Brazilian politician, (1979–1983), member of the Chamber of Deputies for Pará (1987–1991, 1997–1999, 2001–2014), COVID-19.
- Eavan Boland, 75, Irish poet, stroke.
- Sir Brian Brown, 85, British admiral, Second Sea Lord (1988–1991).
- Ian Causley, 79, Australian politician, NSW MP (1984–1996) and MP (1996–2007).
- Yves Corbassière, 94, French artist.
- Cis Corman, 93, American casting director (Raging Bull, The Deer Hunter, Once Upon a Time in America).
- Lam Dorji, 86, Bhutanese military officer, COO of the Royal Bhutan Army (1964–2005).
- Joseph Errigo, 81, American politician, member of the New York State Assembly (2000–2010, 2016–2018).
- Bernard Gersten, 97, American theatrical producer, pancreatic cancer.
- Johannes Gjerdåker, 84, Norwegian historian and translator.
- Rollin Glewwe, 86, American politician, member of the Minnesota Senate (1967–1972).
- Lynn Harrell, 76, American cellist.
- Robert Herbin, 81, French football player (Saint-Étienne, national team) and manager (Strasbourg).
- Young Jessie, 83, American R&B singer (The Flairs, The Coasters).
- Ramon Jimenez Jr., 64, Filipino advertising executive and politician, Secretary of Tourism (2011–2016).
- Moussa Seybou Kassey, 60–61, Nigerien politician.
- Jim Keers, 88, English footballer (Darlington).
- Yupadee Kobkulboonsiri, 51, Thai-American artist and jewelry designer, COVID-19.
- James Mahoney, 62, American pulmonologist and internist, COVID-19.
- Mark McNamara, 60, American basketball player (Philadelphia 76ers, San Antonio Spurs, Los Angeles Lakers), heart failure.
- Beverley Pearson Murphy, 91, Canadian endocrinologist.
- Sarah Milledge Nelson, 88, American archaeologist and anthropologist.
- Gideon Patt, 87, Israeli politician, member of the Knesset (1970–1996), Minister of Industry (1979–1984) and Tourism (1981, 1988–1992).
- Francesco Perrone, 89, Italian Olympic long-distance runner (1960), COVID-19.
- Mark Pharaoh, 88, English Olympic athlete.
- Jeannette Pilou, 82, Greek soprano.
- Barbara Rosiek, 60, Polish writer, poet and clinical psychologist.
- Mohammad Shariff, 99, Pakistani admiral, Chief of Naval Staff (1975–1979) and Chairman Joint Chiefs of Staff Committee (1977–1980).
- Marty Smith, 63, American motocross racer, dune buggy rollover.
- Troy Sneed, 52, American gospel singer, COVID-19.
- Chavalit Soemprungsuk, 80, Thai painter and visual artist, National Artist (2014), COVID-19.
- Suning Wang, 61, Chinese-born Canadian chemist.
- Nur Yerlitaş, 64, Turkish fashion designer, brain cancer.
- Dragutin Zelenović, 91, Serbian politician and academic, Prime Minister (1991).

=== 28 ===
- Jinnat Ali, 23, Bangladeshi record holder, nation's tallest person, brain tumor.
- Michael Anderton, 88, British psychologist and Anglican priest.
- Bob Betley, 80, American professional golfer.
- David Boe, 84, American organist and pedagogue, COVID-19.
- Bill Boysen, 84, American artist.
- Louis Cardiet, 77, French footballer (Stade Rennais, Paris Saint-Germain, national team).
- Jamilur Reza Choudhury, 76, Bangladeshi engineer and educationist, Vice-Chancellor of BRACU (2001–2010) and UAP (since 2012), heart attack.
- Luigi De Rosso, 84, Italian Olympic racewalker (1960).
- Marc Garanger, 84, French photographer.
- Jill Gascoine, 83, British actress (The Gentle Touch, C.A.T.S. Eyes, The Onedin Line), complications from Alzheimer's disease.
- Georgianna Glose, 74, American nun and activist, complications from COVID-19.
- Phillip Harth, 94, American literary scholar.
- Ladislav Hejdánek, 92, Czech philosopher and political dissident (Charter 77).
- Alfred Kronig, 91, Swiss Olympic cross-country skier.
- Bobby Lewis, 95, American singer ("Tossin' and Turnin'"), pneumonia.
- Gil Loescher, 75, American political scientist, heart failure.
- Paul Marks, 93, American oncologist and academic administrator, President of the Memorial Sloan Kettering Cancer Center (1980–1999), pulmonary fibrosis and lung cancer.
- Bobby Martin, 32, American football player born with no legs, ATV accident.
- Robert May, Baron May of Oxford, 84, Australian scientist (Chaos theory), Chief Scientific Advisor to the UK Government (1995–2000) and President of Royal Society (2000–2005).
- Mincaye, Ecuadorian Waorani Catholic preacher.
- Mary Ellen Moylan, 94, American ballet dancer.
- David Mudd, 86, British journalist and politician, MP (1970–1992).
- Ed Napoleon, 82, American baseball player and coach, pneumonia and cancer.
- Silas Silvius Njiru, 91, Kenyan Roman Catholic prelate, Bishop of Meru (1976–2004), COVID-19.
- Eddy Pieters Graafland, 86, Dutch football player (Ajax, Feyenoord, national team) and manager.
- Augustino Ramadhani, 74, Tanzanian jurist and religious leader.
- Vajira Ranaweera, 51, Sri Lankan cricketer (Sri Lanka Police Sports Club).
- Brian Richardson, 87, Australian cricketer (Tasmania).
- Michael Robinson, 61, English footballer (Brighton & Hove Albion, Liverpool, Republic of Ireland national team) and sports commentator, melanoma.
- Steve Staker, 76, American football coach.
- Syahrul, 59, Indonesian politician, mayor of Tanjung Pinang (since 2018), COVID-19.
- Mari Winsor, 70, American pilates instructor, amyotrophic lateral sclerosis.
- Keith Yandell, 81, American philosopher of religion.

=== 29 ===
- Hema Bharali, 101, Indian independence activist and social worker.
- Philippe Breton, 83, French Roman Catholic prelate, Bishop of Aire et Dax (2002–2012).
- Germano Celant, 79, Italian art historian, curator and critic, COVID-19.
- Trevor Cherry, 72, English footballer (Leeds United, Huddersfield Town, national team).
- Giacomo dalla Torre del Tempio di Sanguinetto, 75, Italian Prince and Grand Master of the Sovereign Military Order of Malta (since 2018).
- Harold R. DeMoss Jr., 89, American jurist, Judge of the U.S. Court of Appeals for the Fifth Circuit (1991–2015).
- Al Edwards, 83, American politician, member of the Texas House of Representatives (1978–2007, 2009–2011).
- Alexander Fernando, 79, Sri Lankan actor (Ahas Gauwa, Christhu Charithaya, Supiri Balawatha).
- Freddy Fryar, 85, American racing driver.
- Lenora Garfinkel, 89, American architect, COVID-19.
- Allan Gauden, 75, English footballer (Sunderland).
- Denis Goldberg, 87, South African lawyer and political activist (Rivonia Trial), lung cancer.
- Yahya Hassan, 24, Danish poet.
- Todd Hodne, 61, American football player and criminal, cancer.
- Ji Chaozhu, 90, Chinese diplomat and politician, Ambassador to Fiji (1985–1987) and United Kingdom (1987–1991).
- Irrfan Khan, 53, Indian actor (Slumdog Millionaire, Life of Pi, The Lunchbox), cancer.
- Leonid Komogorov, 92, Russian diplomat, Soviet ambassador to Mauritania (1986–1990).
- John Lafia, 63, American screenwriter (Child's Play), suicide by hanging.
- Martin Lovett, 93, English cellist (Amadeus Quartet).
- Dick Lucas, 86, American football player (Philadelphia Eagles), COVID-19.
- Jānis Lūsis, 80, Latvian Hall of Fame javelin thrower, Olympic champion (1968), silver medallist (1972) and bronze medallist (1964), cancer.
- Naziha Mestaoui, 44–45, Belgian artist.
- Guido Münch, 98, Mexican astronomer and astrophysicist.
- Zoe Mungin, 30, American writer and teacher, COVID-19.
- Richard Ndassa, 61, Tanzanian politician, MP (since 1995), COVID-19.
- Robert L. Park, 89, American physicist.
- Binta Pilote, 71–72, Guinean pilot.
- Erich Schriever, 95, Swiss rower, Olympic silver medallist (1948).
- Matty Simmons, 93, American magazine publisher (National Lampoon) and film producer (Animal House, National Lampoon's Vacation).
- Maj Sjöwall, 84, Swedish author (Martin Beck).
- Stezo, 51, American rapper.
- Sally Svendelin, 80, Swiss Olympic archer.
- Gerson Victalino, 60, Brazilian Olympic basketball player (1984, 1988, 1992).
- Noel Walsh, 84, Irish Gaelic footballer, manager and Gaelic games administrator, pneumonia resulting from COVID-19.
- Xie Bingcan, 85, Chinese-born American tai chi practitioner.
- Roger Westman, 80, English architect.
- Stefano Zacchetti, 51, Italian academic.

=== 30 ===
- Mouzawar Abdallah, 78–79, Comorian politician.
- Suleiman Adamu, Nigerian politician, member of the Nasarawa State House of Assembly, COVID-19.
- Ranu Devi Adhikari, 83, Nepali singer.
- Aloysius Ahearn, 94, American politician, Connecticut state representative (1975–1977, 1979–1981).
- Tony Allen, 79, Nigerian drummer (Fela Kuti, The Good, the Bad & the Queen, Rocket Juice & the Moon), ruptured aneurysm.
- John Bryant, 76, British journalist and newspaper editor (The Daily Telegraph, The European, The Sunday Correspondent).
- Óscar Chávez, 85, Mexican singer, songwriter and actor, COVID-19.
- Jordan Cox, 27, English rugby league player (Hull Kingston Rovers, Warrington Wolves, Doncaster), accidental drug overdose.
- Wally K. Daly, 79, English writer.
- Howard M. Fish, 96, American Air Force lieutenant general.
- Chuni Goswami, 82, Indian footballer (Mohun Bagan, national team) and cricketer (Bengal), cardiac arrest.
- Alyce Chenault Gullattee, 91, American psychiatrist and addiction specialist, COVID-19.
- Jootje Gozal, 84, Indonesian Olympic sprinter (1956, 1960).
- William Haddad, 91, American political lobbyist, heart failure.
- BJ Hogg, 65, Northern Irish actor (Give My Head Peace, City of Ember, Your Highness).
- Kundanika Kapadia, 93, Indian novelist.
- Rishi Kapoor, 67, Indian actor (Bobby, Do Dooni Chaar, Kapoor & Sons).
- Michael Keenan, 80, American actor (Picket Fences, Dallas, Complete Works).
- Frederick Kroesen, 97, American Army general.
- Deepak Lal, 80, Indian economist.
- Sam Lloyd, 56, American actor (Scrubs, Galaxy Quest) and musician (The Blanks), heart failure and complications from lung cancer.
- Jean-Marc Manducher, 71, French sports executive (Oyonnax Rugby), COVID-19.
- Bong Osorio, 66, Filipino media executive and communication professor.
- Manuel Vieira Pinto, 96, Portuguese-born Mozambican Roman Catholic prelate, Bishop and Archbishop of Nampula (1967–2000).
- André Pomarat, 89, French actor and director.
- Billy Ringrose, 89, Irish Olympic equestrian (1956, 1960).
- Dzhenko Sabev, 72, Bulgarian Olympic equestrian (1980).
- George Trilling, 89, American physicist.
- Sylvie Vincent, 79, Canadian anthropologist, COVID-19.
- Yu Lihua, 88, Chinese-American writer, COVID-19.
- Gerhard Zebrowski, 80, German footballer (SV Werder Bremen, OSC Bremerhaven).
