= Walter D'Souza =

Walter D'Souza may refer to:

- Walter D'Souza (cricketer) (?–2020), Indian cricketer
- Walter de Sousa (1920–1989), Indian field hockey player
