= Gérard Piouffre =

French writer (1946–2020)

- Born: 20 January 1946; Orléans, France
- Died: 20 April 2020 (aged 74)
- Occupations: Writer; Historian

Gérard Piouffre (20 January 1946 – 20 April 2020) was a French journalist, writer, and historian.

== Biography ==
Born in Orléans on 20 January 1946, Piouffre joined the French Air Force, where he was a certified air traffic controller. Following his service, he was a traffic officer for British European Airways, then a steward for Air France.

Piouffre studied naval archaeology at the Séminaire de Jean Boudriot, in association with the Musée national de la Marine. He also studied arsenal modeling with a friend who was a cabinetmaker. He published more than 30 books on naval history, and authored several hundred press articles. He participated in many documentaries and was a guest in numerous radio shows in France and abroad.

== Distinctions ==
- Knight of the Ordre du Mérite Maritime (15 January 2015)
- Officer of the Ordre des Arts et des Lettres (16 September 2019, Knight on 15 December 2000)
- Médaille de la Jeunesse, des Sports et de l'Engagement Associatif (7 January 1994)
- Aeronautical Medal (9 July 1997)

== Publications ==
- L’Aurore : frégate légère de 22 canons (1994)
- Naissance de la marine américaine (1995)
- La Guerre russo-japonaise sur mer 1904 - 1905 (1999)
- Manuel de modélisme
- La Légende du Cutty Sark
- Trois Siècles de croiseurs français (2001)
- Voiliers et Hommes de mer (2002)
- Pirates (2002)
- Les mots de la marine (2003)
- L'Hermione, frégate de 1779 (2005)
- Le gréement des navires anciens (2005)
- L'artillerie de marine des origines à nos jours: traité de modélisme naval (2005)
- La Première guerre mondiale (2006)
- Le courrier doit passer: l'aventure de l'Aéropostale (2007)
- Dictionnaire de la marine (2007)
- La guerre d'Algérie (2008)
- Pirates, Flibustiers et Forbans: Des origines à nos jours (2009)
- Paquebots: Des lignes régulières aux croisières (2009)
- Le Titanic ne répond plus (2009)
- L'Âge d'or des voyages en paquebot (2009)
- Titanesques Travaux: 150 ans de grands chantiers (2010)
- La Guerre russo-japonaise (2010)
- Nous étions à bord du Titanic (2012)
- Les Grands naufrages, du Titanic au Costa Concordia (2012)
- Les grandes inventions (2013)
- Les traites négrières (2013)
- Titanic, la Monographie (2013)
- 1914 - L'année terrible (2014)
- Un crime de guerre en 1915 ? - Le torpillage du Lusitania (2015)
- Lapérouse - Le voyage sans retour (2016)
- Eurêka ! Les Grandes Inventions de l'Histoire (2017)
- Sauveteurs en Mer (2017)
- Le Titanic - Vérités et légendes (2018)
- Pirates, corsaires, flibustiers et autres forbans (2018)
- Corsaires, flibustiers et autres forbans (2019)
