= Pahri Azhari =

Indonesian politician (1962–2020)

Regent of Musi Banyuasin
- In office 29 July 2008 – 24 December 2015
- President: Susilo Bambang Yudhoyono; Joko Widodo
- Preceded by: Alex Noerdin
- Succeeded by: Beni Hernedi (acting); Dodi Reza Alex Noerdin

Vice Regent of Musi Banyuasin
- In office 15 Januari 2007 – 18 June 2008
- President: Susilo Bambang Yudhoyono
- Preceded by: Mat Syuroh
- Succeeded by: Islan Hanura

Personal details
- Born: July 3, 1962 Palembang, South Sumatra, Indonesia
- Died: April 23, 2020 (aged 57) Palembang, South Sumatra, Indonesia
- Spouse: Lucianty Pahri
- Children: Iman Falucki; Anggia Fabelita; Facrel Ardafa; Divia Faradiba

Pahri Azhari (3 July 1962 – 23 April 2020) was an Indonesian politician. He was the Regent of Musi Banyuasin for 2008-2012 and elected again for 2012–2015. Previously, he was a member of the Musi Banyuasin Regency Parliament from the National Mandate Party, and was elected as Vice Regent of Musi Banyuasin for the 2007–2012 term to accompany Alex Noerdin. Because of Alex Noerdin resigned to run as a Candidate for Governor of South Sumatra, Pahri was appointed as Regent on July 29, 2008. He died because of traffic collision on 23 April 2020.
