= Bernard Epin =

French writer (1936–2020)

- Born: 27 May 1936; Paris, France
- Died: 1 April 2020 (aged 83); Paris, France
- Occupations: Writer; Literary Critic

Bernard Epin (27 May 1936 – 1 April 2020) was a French writer, literary critic, and communist activist.

== Biography ==
Born into a working-class family, Epin attended primary school in the 14th arrondissement of Paris. He joined the French Communist Party in 1954 and the editorial team of L'École et la Nation, a communist magazine, in 1957. After his military service in Algeria, Epin became editorial secretary of the magazine. He also collaborated with the weekly Révolution, the monthly Regards, and L'Humanité.

In addition to his criticism in children's literature, Epin wrote ten essays, including Les livres de vos enfants, parlons-en in 1985. This essay defended the idea of emancipation in children's reading and stressed the need for children's studies to be democratized.

He served as mayor of Saint-Ouen from 1965 to 2001, and directed cultural affairs from 1971 to 1995.

Epin died on 1 April 2020 at the age of 83 due to COVID-19.

== Publications ==
- Découvrir la littérature d'aujourd'hui pour les jeunes (1976)
- Profession chanteur (1977)
- Chez nous à Saint-Ouen (1983)
- L'éducation civique, c'est quoi aujourd'hui ? (1985)
- Les livres de vos enfants, parlons-en (1985)
- La Révolution française: elle inventa nos rêves (1988)
- Les petits mots des petits mômes (1990)
- Le grand livre du jeune citoyen: avec le texte intégral de la Déclaration universelle des droits de l'homme (1998, 2004, 2012)
- Mon premier livre de citoyen du monde (2000, 2012, 2014)
