= André Cristol =

French footballer (1942–2020)

Personal information
- Date of birth: 13 September 1942
- Place of birth: La Tour-sur-Orb, France
- Date of death: 5 April 2020 (aged 77)
- Height: 1.78 m (5 ft 10 in)
- Position: Midfielder

Senior career*
Years	Team	Apps	(Gls)
1961–1963	AS Béziers Hérault	60	(24)
1963–1964	Stade Français	10	(2)
1964–1966	OGC Nice	6	(0)
1966–1967	AS Béziers Hérault	25	(8)
1967–1968	OGC Nice	25	(3)
1968–1970	Limoges FC	43	(10)
1970–1972	Montpellier HSC	54	(18)
Total		198	(63)

Managerial career
- 1974–1976: Montpellier HSC
- * Club domestic league appearances and goals

André Cristol (13 September 1942 – 5 April 2020) was a French footballer and coach. He played midfielder. He mainly played for AS Béziers Hérault, Montpellier HSC, and Limoges FC. He played 37 matches in Ligue 1 and 168 matches in Ligue 2.
