= Conrad Dehn =

British barrister (1926–2020)

Conrad Francis Dehn QC (24 November 1926 – 26 April 2020) was a British barrister. He died in April 2020 at the age of 93.

== Career ==
=== Early career ===
Conrad served as a Recorder (1974-1978), as a deputy High Court Judge (1988-1996), as the Chairman of the Bar Council Working party on Liability for Defective Products (1975-1977), as a member of the Foster Committee of Inquiry into Operators’ Licences, Dept of Transport (1978).

=== Later career ===
Conrad served as the Chairman of the London University Appellate Disciplinary Committee (1986-1996), as the Vice Chairman of the London Legal Aid Committee (1987-1992), as a governor of the Inns of Court School of Law (1996 - 2008), as a director of the Bar Mutual Indemnity Fund (1988-2010) and as a legal adviser to and vice-president of Age Concern UK.
