= Gangchen Tulku Rinpoche =

Tibetan-Italian lama (1941–2020)

Gangchen Rinpoche གངས་ཅན་རིན་པོ་ཆེ་
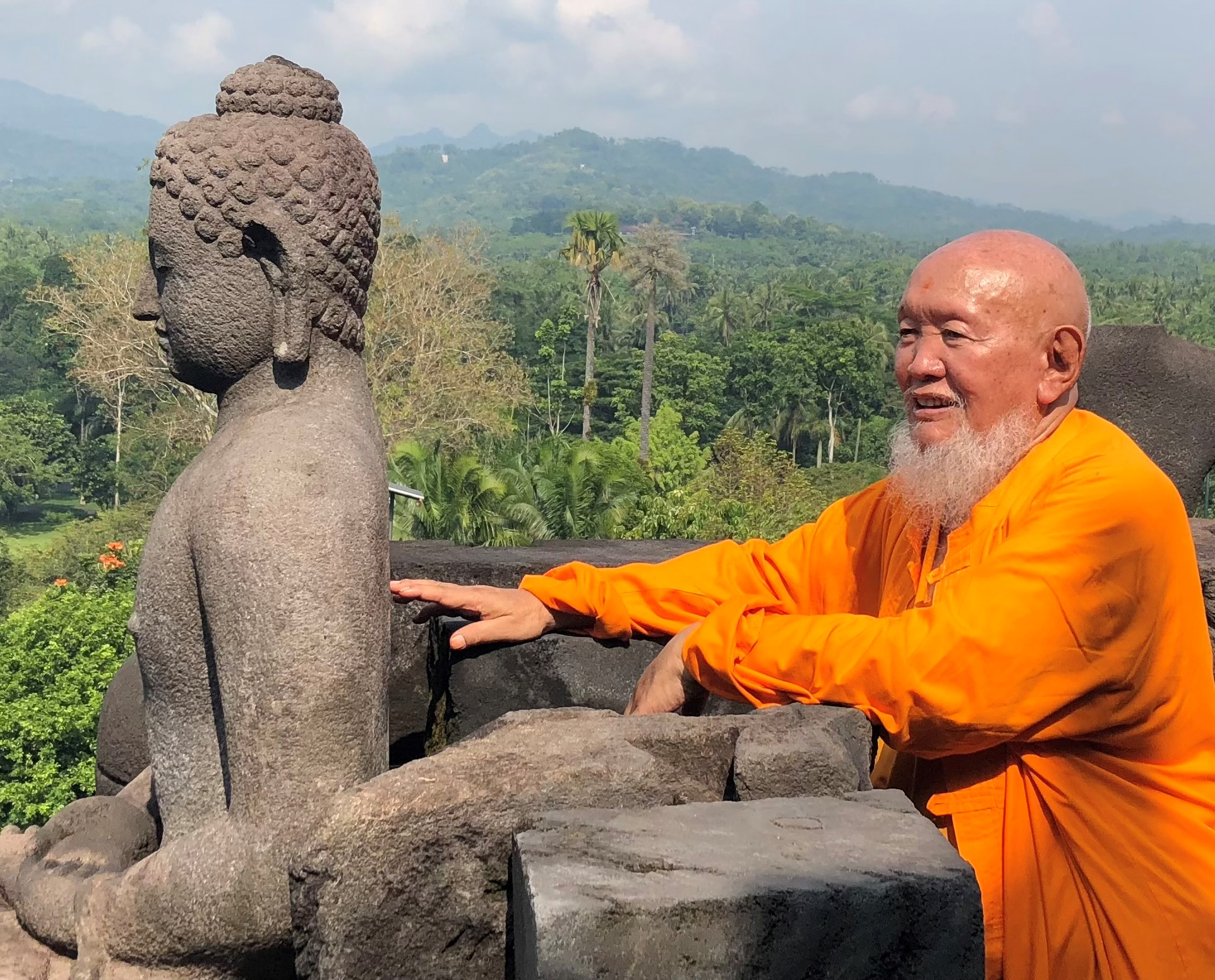

Personal life
- Born: July 7, 1941 Drakshu, Tibet
- Died: April 18, 2020 (aged 78) Verbania, Italy

Religious life
- Religion: Tibetan Buddhism

Lobsang Thubten Trinley Yarphel (Tibetan: གངས་ཅན་བློ་བཟང་ཐུབ་བསྟན་འཕྲིན་ལས་ཡར་འཕེལ་, Wylie: gangs-can blo-bzang thub-bstan 'phrin-las yar-'phel, 7 July 1941 – 18 April 2020), was the 5th Gangchen Tulku Rinpoche of Tibet. He was a Tibetan-Italian lama of the Gelug school of Tibetan Buddhism. He also established the NgalSo Tantric Self-Healing methods. Some of his life's work can be found documented in a published book: Gangchen A Spiritual Heritage.

== Biography ==
Lama Gangchen Tulku Rinpoche (Dakshu, Tibet 1941- Verbania, Italy, 2020), was an important Tibetan lama belonging to the last generation of lamas from the ‘old Tibet’. He is still today spiritual guide and a point of reference for thousands of people, not only Buddhists, all over the world. At a young age he was recognised as the reincarnation of the lama healer Kachen Sapen. He completed his traditional education in some of the most important monastic universities, first in Tibet and later in India.

Lama Gangchen entered the monastery at the age of five and completed the first period of study by the age of eighteen in Tibetan medicine, astrology and philosophy in two of Tibet’s major monastic universities: Sera Me and Tashi Lhunpo. In 1963 he left Tibet and went into exile in India, where he completed his monastic studies at Sera Me and Varanasi Sanskrit University (Bishwa Vhidhyana) in Benares, India.

He was a direct disciple of the greatest lamas of the Gelugpa school of the twentieth century, such as Kyabje Trijang Dorje Chang, Kyabje Zong Rinpoche, who taught him Tibetan medicine, healing methods and astrology, and Kyabje Ling Rinpoche. After completing his studies, he dedicated himself for many years to supporting and caring for the Tibetan community in India, Nepal and Sikkim where he worked tirelessly as a spiritual teacher and healer. In the 1980s, upon the invitation of Italian friends, he began to travel throughout Europe and finally settled in Italy. As a renowned healing lama, he began to share his knowledge of the teachings of the "inner scientist" Buddha Shakyamuni, as he himself defined the Buddha.

Having verified the great interest of Westerners for information and instruction on healing methods and peace education, he dedicated himself to the creation and teaching of the NgalSo Tantric Self-Healing practices, adapting the complex methodologies of the Tantric tradition of Tibetan Buddhism to the needs of modern society. An instructional text book. NgalSo Self-Healing methods to relax the body, speech and mind: Self-Healing II was made available to anyone without the necessary oral transmission as per some requirement of other Tantric practice.

Since 1982, Lama Gangchen has travelled extensively and provided healing and teaching worldwide. He has also led many pilgrimages to some of the most important holy places of different religious and spiritual denominations in the world. Lama Gangchen promoted the integration between Tibetan Medicine with allopathic medicine to which patients have reported a success with the therapy. Dr Rogier Hoenders a psychiatrist and a researcher from University of Groningen was reported to start a clinical trial to study the effects of Ngalso Self- Healing method in patients healing outcome. At present Lama Gangchen has established more than 100 Inner Peace Education centres or Self-Healing Study Groups worldwide.

Lama Gangchen Peace Publication also published other notable text such as : Guide to the Good Thought Supermarket, Making Peace with the Environment I: A Crystal Clear Vision of the Inner Wind System to Make Peace with the Outer and Inner Environment, Volume 1

Amongst many awards and recognitions for his work, in 2019 the Unesco Chair of Health Anthropology – biospheres and healing methods – of the University of Genoa certified that the NgalSo healing teachings and the practices transmitted by Lama Gangchen implemented the goals of the United Nations 2030 agenda. These goals are the protection of traditional medicines, healing practices and cultural traditions, the development of local economies and the revitalisation of the natural environment.

Lama Gangchen founded numerous centres across the world. Among the first were Kunpen Lama Gangchen in Milan and the Albagnano Healing Meditation Centre in Verbania, Italy. Further centres followed — Shide Choe Tsog in São Paulo, Brazil; Gangchen Drupkang in Kathmandu, Nepal; Mani Bhadra Centre in Dalfsen, the Netherlands; and Entorno de Paz in Almería, Spain.

A tireless advocate for interfaith dialogue and spiritual cooperation, Lama Gangchen championed communication between religious and spiritual movements throughout his life. The Lama Gangchen World Peace Foundation — an NGO affiliated with the United Nations — presented a proposal for the establishment of a permanent spiritual forum under the aegis of the UN, reflecting his vision of peace as a universal human endeavour.

Since 1992, his Fondazione Lama Gangchen Help in Action Onlus has been dedicated to humanitarian aid projects serving Himalayan communities, providing practical support alongside his broader mission of inner and world peace.

Lama Gangchen died from COVID-19 in 2020. On April 20, 2020, Dhammakaya Foundation, Wat Phra Dhammakaya Temple published a condolence article on their website and elaborated about Lama Gangchen's visit to the foundation in over 20 years and his involvement in the presentation of the awards to winners of the Path of Progress Dhamma Quiz. The Path Of Progress Peace Education Program is listed as a UNESCO Culture of Peace and Non-Violence Program in April 2000. The Path of Progress was initiated in 2525 B.E.(1982) by Most Venerable Luang Por Dhammajayo. The aim of the project is to provide youth with a guideline on how to live wholesome lives with respect to “virtues and knowledge"
