= Frank J. Brown =

African-American visual artist (1956–2020)

Frank J. Brown (1956 – April 9, 2020) was an African-American visual artist active in Minnesota. His sculptures have entered several public collections.

== Early life and education ==
Brown was raised in Carbondale, Illinois, the youngest of ten children. His family later relocated to Springfield, Illinois, where he began his career as an artist while in high school. As a young man, he relocated to Cleveland, Ohio for a time, and then later attended Southern Illinois University Carbondale, where he received his BFA. He received an MFA from the University of Wisconsin–Madison in arts, metals, and ceramics. He relocated to St. Paul in 1997, where he lived and worked in the Lowertown neighborhood for the majority of his career.

== Works ==
Brown's tzedakah box, Hope for Tomorrow, is in the collection of the Minneapolis Institute of Art. The work was created for "Tzedakah Box: The Art of Giving", a competition sponsored by the museum in 2002. Brown described the theme of his first place-winning box as "Through our suffering, we create hope for tomorrow."

His large ceramic sculpture A Community Within Reach is permanently installed in a park in Sarasota, Florida. He created the piece in St. Paul over the course of a year.

He also created a bust of Martin Luther King Jr., Living For The Dream, for the Municipal Building in Madison, Wisconsin.
