= Herbert Jones (footballer, born 1929) =

Welsh footballer (1929–2020)

Personal information
- Full name: Herbert Neville Jones
- Date of birth: 20 January 1929
- Place of birth: Mold, Flintshire, Wales
- Date of death: April 16, 2020 (aged 91)
- Place of death: Mold, Flintshire, Wales
- Position: Inside forward

Senior career*
| Years | Team | Apps | (Gls) |
- Colwyn Bay
| 1951–1952 | Wrexham | 1 | (0) |
- Llandudno
- * Club domestic league appearances and goals

Herbert Neville Jones (20 January 1929 – 16 April 2020) was a Welsh professional footballer who played as an inside forward. He made one appearance in the English Football League with Wrexham in the 1951–52 season. He also played in the Welsh league for Colwyn Bay and Llandudno. He died in April 2020 at the age of 91.
