= Donald Simpson =

President of the Center for Research Libraries (1942–2020)

Donald Simpson

Donald Bruce Simpson (December 13, 1942 – April 5, 2020) was a librarian who served as the third president of the Center for Research Libraries (CRL) from 1980-1999.

Prior to coming to CRL he worked as Executive Director at the Bibliographical Center for Research in Denver, Colorado from 1975-1980. During that time, he compiled and edited the fourth volume of The state library agencies: a survey project report, in 1979. This book was co-sponsored by the Chief Officers of State Library Agencies (COSLA). During his tenure at CRL Simpson oversaw two major building projects--Kenwood I, built when CRL outgrew its original location and Kenwood II at a later time.

Simpson was born in Ithaca, New York to Francis Alfred Simpson and Drusilla Lucille (Dickson) Simpson. Simpson received an Associate of Arts from Corning Community College in New York in 1962 and a BA from Alfred University in 1964. He also went on to receive a Master of Science from Syracuse University in 1970.
