= Yupadee Kobkulboonsiri =

Thai-American artist and jewelry designer (c.1968–2020)

- Born: 1968; Bangkok
- Died: 27 April 2020 (aged 51–52)
- Occupations: Artist and jewelry designer

Yupadee Kobkulboonsiri (c. 1968 – 27 April 2020) was a Thai-American artist and jewelry designer.

== Life and education ==
She was born and raised in Bangkok. She got a B.F.A. in decorative and visual communication design from Silpakorn University in Bangkok in 1986. She then worked as art director at Grey/Thailand, the international agency's Bangkok headquarters.

In 1999, Kobkulboonsiri earned an associate of applied science degree in jewelry design when she graduated from the Fashion Institute of Technology.

For nearly a decade she lived in a women's home run by the Sisters of Divine Providence of Kentucky, in order to save money to send to her family.

She began her career when she was recommended by FIT's professors to the owner of Grunberger Jewelry as the school's most promising alumnus. She worked at the company for 20 years, and while there became the first American winner of the World Gold Council's Gold Virtuosi Award.

Kobkulboonsiri was a finalist or winner in every competition she entered.

In her last years, she produced furniture together with her husband.

Kobkulboonsiri was a devout Buddhist. She was married to Steven Fishman, an artist. She died from COVID-19 on 27 April 2020, at the age of 51.

== Awards ==
Her awards include:

- Bridal Design Category, JCK Jewelers Choice Awards, USA
- Rising Star Awards, The Fashion Group International, USA (2012)
- The International Pearl Design Contest, Japan
- Gold Virtuosi Award 2, World Gold Council Design Competition, Italy
- The North American Tahitian Pearl Trophy Awards, USA
- Evocative Gold: A Renaissance, World Gold Council. UK
- The First Jewelers Choice Awards, USA
- NICHE Awards, USA
- The International South Sea Pearl Design Competition, Hong Kong
- Gold Virtuosi Award 1, World Gold Council Design Competition, Italy
- The International Tahitian Pearl Trophy Awards, France
- The North American Tahitian Pearl Trophy Awards, USA
