= Duncan Ellis =

Canadian football player (1930–2020)

Profile
- Position: Tackle

Personal information
- Born: January 29, 1930
- Died: April 9, 2020 (aged 90)
- Listed height: 6 ft 0 in (1.83 m)
- Listed weight: 220 lb (100 kg)

Career history
- 1953–1954: Hamilton Tiger-Cats

Awards and highlights
- Grey Cup champion (1953)

Duncan A. Ellis (January 29, 1930 – April 9, 2020) was a Canadian professional football player who played for the Hamilton Tiger-Cats. He won the Grey Cup with them in 1953. He previously attended and played football at the University of Toronto. He later founded and coached the football program at Eastview Secondary School in Barrie, Ontario.

Duncan Ellis died on April 9, 2020.
