= Brian Glendinning =

English footballer (1934–2020)

Personal information
- Full name: Brian Glendinning
- Date of birth: 26 December 1934
- Place of birth: Newcastle upon Tyne, England
- Date of death: 23 April 2020 (aged 85)
- Place of death: Gateshead, England
- Position: Forward

Youth career
- –: Felham B.C.

Senior career*
Years	Team	Apps	(Gls)
1955–1956	Darlington	12	(2)
–	South Shields		
- * Club domestic league appearances and goals

Brian Glendinning (26 December 1934 – 23 April 2020) was an English footballer who played in the Football League for Darlington. A centre forward, he went on to play non-league football for South Shields. Glendinning died in Gateshead on 23 April 2020, at the age of 85.
