= Gulshan Ewing =

Indian journalist (1928–2020)

- Born: Gulshan Mehta; 1928; Bombay, British Raj
- Died: April 18, 2020 (aged 92); Richmond, London, United Kingdom
- Occupation: Journalist

Gulshan Ewing (née Mehta) (1928 – 18 April 2020) was an Indian journalist and socialite. She edited two of India's most popular magazines – women's journal Eve's Weekly and film magazine Star & Style – between 1966 and 1989.

== Career ==
Besides building a prominent reputation in the Eve's Weekly and Star & Style for some 23 years, she had earlier begun her career with the Dosu Karaka-edited Current and later moved over to Femina, which was published by The Times of India group. The Eve's Weekly was owned by the Somani group.

== Tributes ==
Following her death in mid-2020, prominent Indian journalists who had worked with her around a generation earlier paid rich tributes to her memory. Among these was Sherna Gandhy's article in the Mid-Day.

== Personal life and death ==
She was born in Mumbai to a Parsi family. In 1955, she married an Englishman named Guy Ewing with whom she moved to the UK in 1990. She died of COVID-19-related complications in Richmond, London, on 18 April 2020.
