= Jacques Le Brun =

French historian (1931–2020)

- Born: 18 May 1931; Paris, France
- Died: 6 April 2020 (aged 88); Paris, France
- Occupation: Historian

Jacques Le Brun (18 May 1931 – 6 April 2020) was a French historian who specialized in the study of Christianity in the 17th century.

== Biography ==
Le Brun's first works were related to Jacques-Bénigne Bossuet. He was Director of Honorary Studies at the École pratique des hautes études, and the Chair of History of Modern Catholicism at the school. In addition to his research, he also edited the works of François Fénelon.

Jacques Le Brun died on 6 April 2020 at the age of 88 after contracting COVID-19.

== Publications ==
- Bossuet (1970)
- Les Opuscules spirituels de Bossuet. Recherches sur la tradition nancéienne (1970)
- La spiritualité de Bossuet (1972)
- Le Pur Amour de Platon à Lacan (2002)
- La Jouissance et le Trouble. Recherches sur la littérature chrétienne de l'âge classique (2004)
- Le Pouvoir d'abdiquer. Essai sur la déchéance volontaire (2009)
- Sœur et amante. Les biographies spirituelles féminines du XVIIe siècle (2013)
- Dieu, un pur rien. Angelus Silesius, poésie, métaphysique et mystique (2019)
- Le Christ imaginaire au XVIIème siècle (2020)
- La chapelle de la rue blomet (2021)
