= Arminsyah =

Indonesian prosecutor (1960–2020)

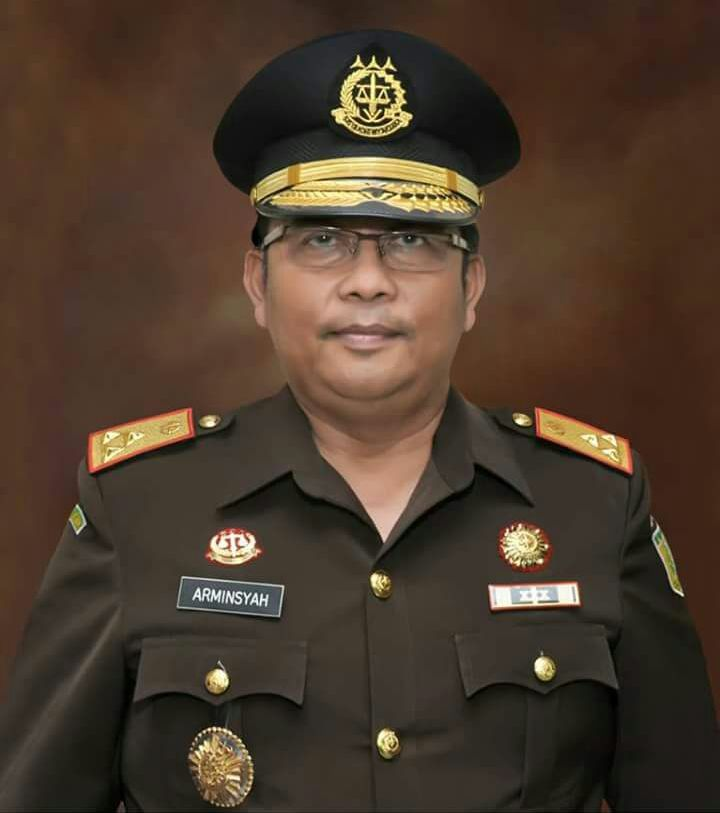

Vice Attorney General of Indonesia
- In office 15 November 2017 – 4 April 2020
- President: Joko Widodo
- Preceded by: Bambang Waluyo
- Succeeded by: Setia Untung Arimuladi

Personal details
- Born: May 3, 1960 Padang, Sumatra Barat, Indonesia
- Died: April 4, 2020 (aged 59) Jakarta, Indonesia

Arminsyah (3 May 1960 – 4 April 2020) was an Indonesian prosecutor. He was Vice Attorney General of Indonesia from 15 November 2017 to his death on 4 April 2020. He died because of traffic collision at Jagorawi Toll Road while driving a Nissan GT-R.
