= André Roumieux =

French nurse (1932–2020)

- Born: 20 May 1932; Mayrinhac-Lentour, France
- Died: 18 April 2020 (aged 87); Gramat, France
- Occupation: Nurse

André Roumieux (20 May 1932 – 18 April 2020) was a French psychiatric nurse who served at the Ville-Évrard psychiatric hospital in Neuilly-sur-Marne.

He is mainly known for his first book, Je travaille à l'asile d'aliénés. Following his retirement in 1988, he continued to write on the subject of psychiatry.

== Publications ==
- Je travaille à l’asile d’aliénés (1974)
- La Tisane et la camisole, trente ans de psychiatrie publique (1981)
- Artaud et l'asile (1996)
- L'abbé Pierre, le pèlerin d'Emmaüs (1999)
- Ville-Évrard. Murs, destins et histoire d’un hôpital psychiatrique (2008)
- Les Retournaïres (2010)
