= Oscar Cohen =

American entertainment industry executive (1928–2020)

Oscar Albert "Sonny" Cohen (May 30, 1928 – April 10, 2020) was an American entertainment industry executive who was president of the Associated Booking Corporation (ABC).

== Biography ==
Cohen was born in the Bronx, New York City, and aged 14 started work as an office boy for Joe Glaser at his Associated Booking Corporation. He worked closely with Glaser in managing and booking jazz musicians in the 1940s, and became particularly closely involved in the career of Louis Armstrong, arranging his advance publicity, traveling with him around the world and acting as his road manager. As ABC diversified from dealing with jazz in the early 1950s, he expanded the agency's involvement in rhythm and blues, signing Billy Ward and the Dominoes, Big Bill Broonzy, LaVern Baker, and others.

He became a theatrical agent for Associated Booking, and represented many leading figures in the entertainment industry including Duke Ellington, Billie Holiday, Ella Fitzgerald, Shirley Bassey, Dizzy Gillespie and Lionel Hampton. He became vice-president at ABC under Glaser, and president in 1972 following Glaser's death. As tastes changed through the 1970s and later, he was influential in developing the careers of such performers as Little Richard (reviving career), Bob Marley, B. B. King, Rod Stewart, Alice Cooper, The Allman Brothers, and Mary J. Blige.

He helped establish The Louis Armstrong Educational Foundation, Inc. (LAEF), a not-for-profit organization that supports education and musicians while promoting Armstrong's legacy, and remained the organization's trustee and executive agent.

He died in Boca Raton, Florida, aged 91.
