= Anthony Senecal =

American politician and butler (1941–2020)

- Born: Anthony Peter Senecal; October 29, 1941; Plattsburgh, New York
- Died: April 21, 2020 (aged 78); Plattsburgh, New York
- Occupations: Butler; Politician
- Employer: Donald Trump
- Known for: Personal butler to US President Donald Trump
- Political party: Republican

Anthony Peter Senecal (October 29, 1941 – April 21, 2020) was an American politician and butler. He was the butler of Donald Trump, and also employed as the "in house historian" and tour leader at Trump's private club and part-time residence, Mar-a-Lago. In the 1990s, he was the mayor of Martinsburg, West Virginia.

He entered the public spotlight in 2016 when numerous Facebook posts he made were exposed by Mother Jones. They included calls for executing Barack Obama and Hillary Clinton. Senecal endorsed Donald Trump for president. Trump called Senecal's remarks "disgusting", adding that "Mr. Senecal is obviously a very troubled man.” Trump's campaign also disavowed Senecal's views when they were made public, but Senecal was allowed to continue conducting tours at the Trump property in Florida.

== Beliefs and public statements ==
Senecal frequently stated that President Obama is a "secret Muslim" and has called the White House the "white mosque". Senecal was questioned by the Secret Service about his calls for the assassination of President Obama. Afterward, he stated that Washington was too far for him to drive to kill the President, but that he hoped somebody else would do it. He said, “I think it should have been done by the military in the first term—they still have a chance to do it.” In an interview with NBC News, Senecal stated that the US should use nuclear weapons in Detroit and Milwaukee to "bomb out" the Muslim populations there.
