= Georges Cukierman =

French activist (1926–2020)

- Born: 11 June 1926; Paris
- Died: 17 April 2020 (aged 93)
- Occupation: Resistant

Georges Cukierman (11 June 1926 – 17 April 2020) was a French resistant and communist activist. He was the grandfather of French Senator Cécile Cukierman.

== Biography ==
Cukierman joined the Mouvement Jeunes Communistes de France in 1942. After World War II, he worked as a secretary for Frédéric Joliot-Curie, and then a collaborator for Jacques Duclos in Montreuil and Fernande Valignat.

He was President of the Comité pour la mémoire des enfants déportés parce que nés Juifs (CMEDJ), created in 2001 by his wife Raymonde-Rebecca Cukierman.
