= Karin Priester =

German historian and political scientist (1941–2020)

- Born: 29 December 1941; Gliwice
- Died: 25 April 2020 (aged 78); Münster, Germany
- Occupation: Historian

Karis Priester (29 December 1941 – 25 April 2020) was a German historian and political scientist.

== Biography ==
Priester studied romance languages, history, philosophy, and political science at the University of Cologne, Aix-Marseille University, the Free University of Berlin, and the University of Florence. She obtained her doctorate in history and her habilitation in political science from the University of Marburg with a thesis on Italian Marxism. After teaching at the University of Giessen and RWTH Aachen University, she was a professor of political sociology at the University of Münster starting in 1980. She retired in February 2007. After her retirement, she studied populism and right-wing extremism.

Karis Priester died in Münster on 25 April 2020 at the age of 78.

== Works ==
- Der italienische Faschismus. Ökonomische und ideologische Grundlagen (1972)
- Studien zur Staatstheorie des italienischen Marxismus: Gramsci und Della Volpe (1981)
- Hat der Eurokommunismus eine Zukunft? Perspektiven und Grenzen des Systemwandels in Westeuropa (1982)
- Rassismus und kulturelle Differenz (1997)
- Mythos Tod. Tod und Todeserleben in der modernen Literatur (2001)
- Mary Shelley. Die Frau, die Frankenstein erfand. Eine Biografie (2001)
- Mary Wollstonecraft. Ein Leben für die Frauenrechte (2002)
- Rassismus. Eine Sozialgeschichte (2003)
- Geschichte der Langobarden. Gesellschaft – Kultur – Alltagsleben (2004)
- Populismus. Historische und aktuelle Erscheinungsformen (2007)
- Rechter und linker Populismus: Annäherung an ein Chamäleon (2012)
- Das Phänomen des Berlusconismus (2013)
- Mystik und Politik. Ernesto Laclau, Chantal Mouffe und die radikale Demokratie (2014)
- Warum Europäer in den Heiligen Krieg ziehen. Der Dschihadismus als rechtsradikale Jugendbewegung (2017)
- Rechtspopulismus – ein umstrittenes theoretisches und politisches Phänomen (2017)
