= Taufiq Tirmizi =

Pakistani cricketer (1960–2020)

Personal information
- Full name: Syed Taufiq Tirmizi
- Born: 18 August 1960
- Died: 9 April 2020 (aged 59)
- Source: Cricinfo, 19 April 2020

Syed Taufiq Tirmizi (18 August 1960 – 9 April 2020) was a Pakistani cricketer who played in twelve first-class matches between 1976 and 1981. Tirmizi died of cardiac arrest.
