= Shahin Shahablou =

Iranian photographer (1964–2020)

- شاهین شهابلو
- Born: 27 January 1964
- Died: 15 April 2020 (aged 56)
- Occupations: Photographer, gay rights activist

Shahin Shahablou (Persian: شاهین شهابلو; 27 January 1964 – 15 April 2020) was an Iranian photographer.

== Biography ==
Shahablou was raised in Tehran, and obtained a bachelor's and master's degree in photography from the University of Tehran. For the last two years of his undergraduate course he worked for the Iranian Cultural Heritage Organisation, photographing heritage sites while managing the organisation's darkroom. He taught photography, and his work was displayed in solo exhibitions in Iran and India. He became a photojournalist at the new Azad newspaper, a pro-reformist publication established during Mohammad Khatami's presidency, and became a photojournalist and a board member of the Iranian Photojournalists Association.

When Azad was shut down in 2001 after publishing a caricature of an ayatollah, Shahablou travelled to India and Afghanistan looking for documentary subject matter, resulting in well-received solo exhibitions in Delhi and Tehran. He continued teaching, and returned to Tehran University of Art to complete an MA in photography in 2006.

Shahablou was a gay man and a gay rights activist. Amid growing social repression after Mahmoud Ahmadinejad took power in 2005, he was imprisoned as a political prisoner for membership of a dissident group.

In 2011 he fled Iran for the United Kingdom, where he was given refugee status. His work was known for capturing LGBT subjects, and he also worked as a photographer for Amnesty International, and for events for Cooltan Arts, alongside working in a supermarket.

Shahablou died of COVID-19 on 15 April 2020, aged 56.
