= Seena Donneson =

American sculptor and printmaker (1924–2020)

- Born: May 1924; New York City
- Died: April 16, 2020 (aged 95); Queens, New York
- Education: Pratt Institute; Art Students League of New York

Seena Donneson (May 1924 - April 16, 2020) (also known as Seena Donneson Gershwin) was an American sculptor and printmaker. She studied at the Pratt Institute and at the Art Students League of New York.

== Collections ==
Donneson's work is held in the permanent collections of the Smithsonian American Art Museum, the Museum of Modern Art, New York, the Brooklyn Museum, the Portland Art Museum and the Amon Carter Museum of American Art.
