= Jean-Marc Manducher =

French businessman (1948–2020)

- Born: 4 August 1948; Oyonnax, France
- Died: 30 April 2020 (aged 71); Bourg-en-Bresse, France
- Occupation: Businessperson

Jean-Marc Manducher (4 August 1948 – 30 April 2020) was a French businessperson and sports executive.

He was President of Oyonnax Rugby from 1995 to 2015, and then was vice-president of the French National Rugby League.

== Career ==
Manducher served as managing director of Ronax, an economics interest group in the plastics industry, from 1995 to 2012. He also became President of Oyonnax Rugby in 1995. The club won the Rugby Pro D2 Championship in 2013, earning them a promotion to the Top 14. At the start of 2015, Manducher suffered a heart attack, and stepped down from his position at Oyonnax Rugby. However, he would remain on the supervisory board.

Manducher was a member of the directing committee of the National Rugby League. He was a representative for Pro D2 from 2006 to 2013, and then of the Top 14 from 2013 to 2016. He was a vice-president of the League from 2012 to 2016, handling files relating to Pro D2.

In 2016, Manducher was re-elected to the directing committee, and became the Senior Vice-president of the National Rugby League. He was also a representative of the league to the French Rugby Federation.

== Death ==
Hospitalized in March 2020, Manducher was placed on a ventilator. He died on 30 April 2020 in Bourg-en-Bresse at the age of 71 due to COVID-19 during the COVID-19 pandemic in France.
