= Tal Rutledge =

American civil rights activist (1929–2020)

Talmadge Rutledge (1929 – April 16, 2020) was an American civil rights activist who lived in Clearwater, Florida. He was the first president of the NAACP's Clearwater branch. His brother Charles was also a businessman and was a party to the lawsuit that precipitated the desegregation of Pinellas County Schools.

At one point he found three bullet holes in his home. He owned a laundromat and dry cleaning establishment.

In 1968, he was convicted and fined $35 for obstructing a school bus during a desegregation demonstration. The national president of the NAACP, Kivie Kaplan, attended the trial. Municipal Court judge Roland Fox presided.

He opposed the closing of a community center named for Martin Luther King Jr. in the North Greenwood section of Clearwater.
