= Joaquim Tosas =

Spanish engineer and politician (1946–2020)

Joaquim Tosas i Mir (1946 – 7 April 2020) was a Spanish engineer and politician, president of the Port of Barcelona between 1996 and 2004.

Tosas was born in Tordera, province of Barcelona in 1946. During his mandate the first two strategic plans of the port were approved: one in 1998 and the other in 2003. These two plans served to define the main lines of the port equipment. Some of these improvement bets were the port railroad, the network of maritime terminals to connect the port with its internal markets, the Logistics Activities Zone (ZAL) or the promotion of the cruise sector.

He died on 7 April 2020 at age 74 in Barcelona from COVID-19 during the COVID-19 pandemic in Spain.
