= Yu Mingfang =

Chinese engineer (1927–2020)

- 郁铭芳
- Born: 3 October 1927; Ningbo, Zhejiang, China
- Died: 12 April 2020 (aged 92); Shanghai, China
- Education: Soochow University
- Scientific career
- Fields: Synthetic fiber
- Workplaces: Chinese Academy of Engineering (CAE)

Chinese name
- Traditional Chinese: 郁銘芳
- Simplified Chinese: 郁铭芳
Transcriptions
Standard Mandarin
- Hanyu Pinyin: Yù Míngfāng

Yu Mingfang (Chinese: 郁铭芳; pinyin: Yù Míngfāng; 3 October 1927 – 12 April 2020) was a Chinese engineer specializing in synthetic fiber. He was the founder of China's chemical fiber industry. He was an academician of the Chinese Academy of Engineering (CAE).

== Biography ==
Yu was born into a merchant family in Ningbo, Zhejiang, on 3 October 1927. In September 1944, he was accepted to Soochow University, where he majored in chemical engineering. After graduating in 1948, he was hired as a technician in Shanghai Textile Construction Corporation. He joined the Communist Youth League of China in 1952 and joined the Chinese Communist Party in June 1954. In November 1957, the Shanghai Textile Industry Bureau founded the Chemical Fiber Department. He became one of the first eleven technicians in Shanghai to participate in the construction of chemical fiber industry. He was appointed deputy chief engineer of the industry, in 1961, becoming deputy director in 1964 and director in 1980. In January 1990, he was transferred to Shanghai Textile Polyester General Factory as chief engineer. In December 2001, he was hired as a professor and doctoral supervisor at Donghua University. He died of illness in Shanghai, on 12 April 2020.

== Honors and awards ==
- 2002 Guanghua Engineering Technology Award
- 1995 Member of the Chinese Academy of Engineering (CAE)
