= Karel Beyers =

Belgian footballer (1943–2020)

Personal information
- Date of birth: 12 March 1943
- Place of birth: Brasschaat, Belgium
- Date of death: 3 April 2020 (aged 77)
- Position: Right winger

Youth career
- Verbroedering Brasschaat

Senior career*
Years	Team	Apps	(Gls)
1961–1974	Royal Antwerp	233	(51)
Total		233	(51)

International career
1964	Belgium	1	(0)
- * Club domestic league appearances and goals

Karel Beyers (12 March 1943 – 3 April 2020) was a Belgian footballer who played as a right winger.

== Career ==
Born in Brasschaat, Beyers played for Verbroedering Brasschaat and Royal Antwerp.

He also earned 1 cap for the Belgium national team in 1964.

== Later life and death ==
Beyers later served on Antwerp's board of directors. He also served as managing director and chairman of the family coffee business, Koffie Beyers.

He died on 3 April 2020, aged 77.
