= Henry Geller =

American communications lawyer and government official

General Counsel of the Federal Communications Commission
- In office 1964–1970
- President: Lyndon B. Johnson; Richard Nixon
- Preceded by: Max Paglin

Assistant Secretary of Commerce for Communications and Information
- In office 1978–1980
- President: Jimmy Carter

Personal details
- Born: February 14, 1924 Springfield, Massachusetts, U.S.
- Died: April 7, 2020 (aged 96) Washington, U.S.
- Education: University of Michigan; Northwestern School of Law
- Occupation: Communications lawyer, government official

Henry Geller (February 14, 1924 – April 7, 2020) was an American communications lawyer and government official. He was known for his role in getting cigarette commercials banned from radio and television.

== Life and career ==
Geller was born in Springfield, Massachusetts. He attended the University of Michigan and Northwestern School of Law.

Geller was general counsel of the Federal Communications Commission from 1964 to 1970.

In 1978, President Jimmy Carter nominated Geller to serve as Assistant Secretary of Commerce for Communications and Information.

Geller died on April 7, 2020 at his home in Washington, at the age of 96.
