= John B. Bryant =

American economist (1947–2020)

John Bradbury Bryant (1947 – April 2, 2020) was an American economist, and the Henry S. Fox Sr. Professor Emeritus at Rice University. He had a PhD in Economics from Carnegie Mellon University (which he received in 1975) and spent a portion of his life working for the Federal Reserve
