= Alain Duret =

French writer (1935–2020)

- Born: 29 October 1935; Paris, France
- Died: 13 April 2020 (aged 84); Quincy, France
- Occupation: Writer

Alain Duret (29 October 1935 – 13 April 2020) was a French writer.

After studying to become a geographer, Duret spent the majority of his career teaching at a large lycée in Paris. He held a doctoral degree in geostrategy from Paris-Sorbonne University, and worked for the newspaper Le Monde for almost thirty years.

His works range from geopolitical essays to detective and science fiction novels. He has published around 20 science fiction short stories, and over 100 articles in various newspapers. His works revolved largely around Marxist ideals.

Alain Duret died on 13 April 2020 in Quincy at the age of 84.

== Notable works ==
- A Lireuse (1978)
- Pays et Gens de France (1984)
- L'Histoire au jour le jour (1986)
- Les Années froides (1986)
- Le ciel est par-dessus le toit (1989)
- Moyen-Orient, crises et enjeux (1994)
- La Nouvelle Menace nucléaire (1996)
- Kronikes de la Fédérasion (1997)
- Israël-Palestine, un destin partagé (1997)
- Le Meilleur Tireur de l'Est (1999)
- La Conquête spatiale, du rêve au marché (2002)
- Aspects géostratégiques du monde postbipolaire (2010)
- Les Occidentaux (2011)
- Mars est encore loin (2012)
- La Banane (2016)
