= Gilbert Garcin =

French photographer (1929–2020)

- Born: 21 June 1929; La Ciotat, France
- Died: 17 April 2020 (aged 90); Marseille, France
- Occupation: Photographer
- Years active: 1995-2020
- Website: gilbert-garcin.com

Gilbert Garcin (21 June 1929 – 17 April 2020) was a French photographer.

== Biography ==
Gilbert Garcin was born in La Ciotat in June 1929. He was not particularly interested in photography, and managed a factory which sold lamps. When he retired, he participated in a photography contest, and won the first prize, which allowed him to go to a Photomontage training course organized by the photographer Pascal Dolémieux during the Rencontres d'Arles in 1992.

The technique fascinated him, and he began at 65 years old a photographer career, always using the same technique in a rather surrealist technique. He became very well known worldwide for his very particular style.

== Technique ==
His photographs always used papercuts of his own figure and sometimes the figure of his wife, integrated in a surreal background.
