= Esteban Yáñez =

Spanish actor (1984–2020)

- Born: 1984; Galicia
- Died: April 21, 2020 (aged 35–36); Santiago de Compostela
- Occupation: Actor

Esteban Yáñez Pazos (1984 – 21 April 2020) was a Spanish actor, musician and blogger from Galicia.

== Biography and career ==
Yáñez was born in Ferrol in 1984 and in his adolescence, he participated in the children's and youth program of the Televisión de Galicia Xabarín Club as "Arroz Hacker". He was also an actor in the Galician TV series Pratos combinados.

With 18 years he began his career in the world of blogs with "I am a neurotic snob" in Blogspot platform. In 2004 he opened the blog "Imbéciles e escuros". He also opened blogs in Blogaliza and Tumblr. Among his musical projects was "Os Megaloves", a duo that united Yánez, with his album Snob Megalove, and Vil Megalove. In 2009 he started the podcast Amor en bruto, and as DJ Pezuñitas he made music selections in Last.fm and Spotify. He was a member of the editorial committee of the magazine Luzes.

== Death ==
He died from coronavirus on 21 April 2020, at the Hospital Clínico Universitario of Santiago de Compostela. He was 35.
