= Tex Earnhardt =

American entrepreneur (1930–2020)

Tex Hal Earnhardt (December 9, 1930 – April 19, 2020) was an American entrepreneur born in Southern Texas. He was the founder and CEO of Earnhardt Auto Centers, an automotive dealership company based in Chandler, Arizona.

== Early life and education ==
Earnhardt grew up around the Rio Grande Valley, Texas. He moved with his family to Chandler in the late 1940s. Earnhardt dropped out of school in the 10th grade.

== Personal life ==
Earnhardt has a daughter, Debra Earnhardt, and two sons, Hal and Jim Babe Earnhardt.

== Career ==
After dropping out of school, Earnhardt learned team roping and horseback riding and became a rodeo cowboy. After that, started working at his father’s gas station and sold auto parts.

=== Earnhardt Auto Centers ===
Earnhardt set up Earnhardt Auto Centers in 1951 and the company has grown from 1 to 24 dealerships, representing 18 brands, employing more than 2,200 people. According to Automotive News Data Center’s top 125 dealership group data, in 2012, the company sold 19,049 new and 9,793 used vehicles in 2012. The company is headquartered in Chandler, Arizona, and has dealerships primarily throughout the Phoenix-area, as well as two in Las Vegas.

=== Philanthropy ===
Earnhardt was a financial supporter of several children’s causes, including the East Valley Boys and Girls Club, Child Crisis Center, Make a Wish Foundation, and Head Start. In June 2019, he donated $240,000 to Phoenix Children’s Hospital.

== Death ==
Earnhardt died on April 19, 2020, at the age of 89 due to natural causes.
