= Walter D'Souza (cricketer) =

Indian cricketer (died 2020)

Walter D'Souza (1926/1927 – 9 April 2020) was an Indian first-class cricketer who played for Gujarat.
