= 2020 in Australia =

- Monarch: Elizabeth II
- Governor-General: David Hurley
- Prime minister: Scott Morrison
- Australian of the Year: James Muecke
- Elections: NT, ACT, QLD

The following lists events that happened during 2020 in Australia.

- Decades: 2000s; 2010s; 2020s; 2030s
- See also: 2020 in Australian television; 2020 in Australian literature; Other events of 2020; Timeline of Australian history

== Incumbents ==
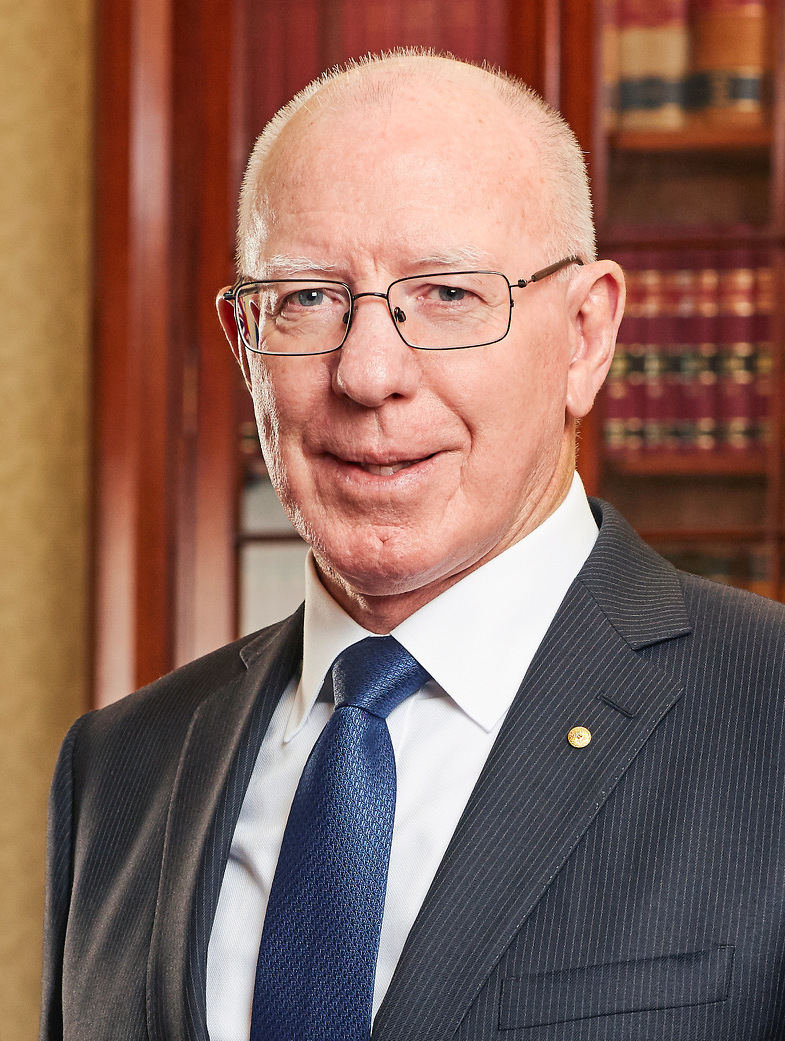
David Hurley

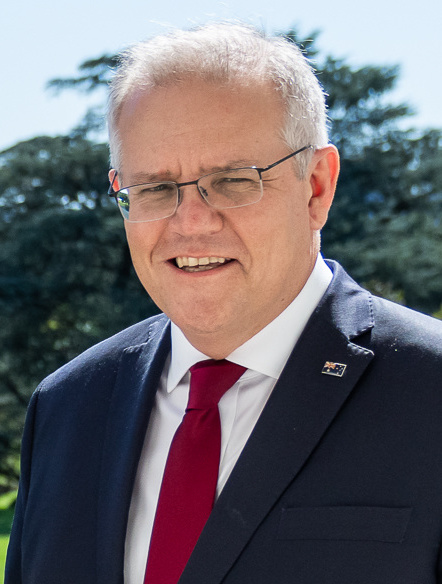
Scott Morrison

- Monarch – Elizabeth II
- Governor-General – David Hurley
- Prime Minister – Scott Morrison
  - Deputy Prime Minister – Michael McCormack
  - Opposition Leader – Anthony Albanese
- Chief Justice – Susan Kiefel

=== State and territory leaders ===
- Premier of New South Wales – Gladys Berejiklian
  - Opposition Leader – Jodi McKay
- Premier of Queensland – Annastacia Palaszczuk
  - Opposition Leader – Deb Frecklington (until 12 November), then David Crisafulli
- Premier of South Australia – Steven Marshall
  - Opposition Leader – Peter Malinauskas
- Premier of Tasmania – Will Hodgman (until 20 January), then Peter Gutwein
  - Opposition Leader – Rebecca White
- Premier of Victoria – Daniel Andrews
  - Opposition Leader – Michael O'Brien
- Premier of Western Australia – Mark McGowan
  - Opposition Leader – Liza Harvey (until 24 November), then Zak Kirkup
- Chief Minister of the Australian Capital Territory – Andrew Barr
  - Opposition Leader – Alistair Coe (until 27 October), then Elizabeth Lee
- Chief Minister of the Northern Territory – Michael Gunner
  - Opposition Leader – Gary Higgins (until 1 February), then Lia Finocchiaro

=== Governors and administrators ===
- Governor of New South Wales – Margaret Beazley
- Governor of Queensland – Paul de Jersey
- Governor of South Australia – Hieu Van Le
- Governor of Tasmania – Kate Warner
- Governor of Victoria – Linda Dessau
- Governor of Western Australia – Kim Beazley
- Administrator of the Australian Indian Ocean Territories – Natasha Griggs
- Administrator of Norfolk Island – Eric Hutchinson
- Administrator of the Northern Territory – Vicki O'Halloran

== Events ==
=== January ===
- 1 January – The death toll from the bushfire season in the South Coast of New South Wales rises to seven.
- 2 January – Victorian Premier Daniel Andrews declares a state of disaster for six local government areas and three alpine resorts in Victoria, due to unprecedented risk from bushfires. Two people are confirmed to have died in eastern Victoria from the fires, with 17 people missing.
- 5 January – The New South Wales town of Eden is evacuated due to the bushfires.
- 17 January – The Wiggles singer Greg Page suffered a cardiac arrest and collapsed on stage at the Wiggles reunion show.
- 20 January – A hail storm sweeps through Canberra in the Australian Capital Territory and surrounding parts of New South Wales, including areas affected by fire storms earlier in the year. The storm with winds recorded up to 177 km pelted hail stones the size of golf balls, big enough to smash car windows and injure birds. The hail caused significant damage to thousands of cars and homes, tore branches off trees, and caused localised flooding. This was less than 24 hours after the region was hit by massive dust storms blanketing entire towns and blacking out the sun.
- 20 January – Will Hodgman resigns as Premier of Tasmania, and is replaced by Peter Gutwein.
- 20 January – 2 February – Novak Djokovic won the Men's Singles and Sofia Kenin the Women's Singles at the 2020 Australian Open.
- 25 January – Australia confirms its first COVID-19 case in Melbourne.

=== February ===
- 3 February – Richard Di Natale resigns as leader of the Australian Greens.
- 4 February – Adam Bandt is elected unopposed as leader of the Australian Greens, with Larissa Waters and Nick McKim as co-deputy leaders.
- 16 February – A fundraising concert Fire Fight Australia is held at Stadium Australia in Sydney following the 2019–20 Australian bushfire season.
- 17 February – General Motors announces it is pulling its Holden brand from Australia.
- 19 February – A mother and her three children, aged 6, 4 and 3 years are killed in a car fire after their father, Rowan Baxter, doused the car in petrol and set it alight in the Brisbane suburb of Camp Hill. Baxter also died from a self-inflicted stab wound near the crime scene.
- 20 February –
  - Wallan rail derailment, two people are killed and several passengers are injured when a NSW TrainLink XPT train traveling from Sydney to Melbourne derails just north of Melbourne at Wallan.
  - Prime Minister Scott Morrison announces the Royal Commission into National Natural Disaster Arrangements to look into the fires that devastated the country over summer. 18 million hectares (44 million acres) burned, 28 people died, and 3,000 homes were destroyed.
- 21 February – 8 March – Australia won the 2020 ICC Women's T20 World Cup, defeating India by 85 runs.
- 22 February –
  - 2019 NRL premiers Sydney Roosters defeat Super League XXIV champions St. Helens R.F.C. 20–12 in the 2020 World Club Challenge, held at Totally Wicked Stadium in St Helens.
  - The Māori All Stars defeat the Indigenous All Stars 30–16 in the 2020 All Stars match. Māori hooker Brandon Smith, of Melbourne Storm, wins the Preston Campbell award for Man of the Match.
  - The Indigenous Women's All Stars defeat the Māori Women's All Stars 10–4 in the 2020 Women's All Stars match. Nakia Davis-Welsh is named Player of the Match.
- 24 February – The head of the Australian Security Intelligence Organisation (ASIO), Mike Burgess, says there is rising foreign and far-right interference in Australia, and that violent Islamist fundamentalism remains ASIO's primary concern.
- 26 February – Down to Earth bushfire relief benefit concert held at Sidney Myer Music Bowl in Melbourne.
- 29 February – Former AFL footballer Joel Bowden wins the 2020 Johnston by-election, representing the Labor Party.

=== March ===
- 1 March – Australia records its first death from the COVID-19 pandemic.
- 3 March –
  - Australian Associated Press announces it will close its newswire service in June, after 85 years in operation.
  - Major supermarket chains begin to ration toilet paper sales, after the COVID-19 pandemic in Australia triggers cases of panic buying across the country.
- 11 March – Two people are killed and two others are injured following a series of stabbings in Melbourne, with the offender shot dead by police.
- 13 March
  - Prime Minister Scott Morrison announces the formation of the National Cabinet, made up of the prime minister, premiers and chief ministers, to manage the lasting impacts of the pandemic.
  - The 2020 Australian Grand Prix is cancelled due to the COVID-19 pandemic.
  - The first NRL game to be played at North Queensland Stadium is held in Townsville when more than 22,000 spectators watch the Brisbane Broncos beat the North Queensland Cowboys.
- 15 March – Morrison announces that all travellers arriving in or returning to Australia from overseas must self-isolate for 14 days, mirroring a similar requirement imposed by New Zealand. Cruise ships will also be barred from docking in the country for 30 days.
- 18 March – Scott Morrison announces that all non-essential indoor gatherings of a hundred people or more will be banned. Schools, universities, workplaces and essential services such as retail stores will be exempt from the new measures.
- 19 March –
  - Premier of Tasmania Peter Gutwein announces that non-essential travellers arriving in Tasmania from must self-isolate for 14 days.
  - Scott Morrison announces that from 20 March all non-residents will be forbidden from entering the country.
  - The 2020 AFL season commences with Richmond taking on Carlton at the MCG.
- 21 March – Chief minister of the Northern Territory, Michael Gunner announces the Northern Territory will introduce strict border controls from 4:00 pm on 24 March. Anyone arriving from interstate or overseas will have to self-isolate for 14 days.
- 22 March –
  - South Australia and Western Australia also follow suit of the Northern Territory and Tasmania to close off their borders starting from Tuesday 24 March. Anyone arriving from interstate and overseas will also have to self isolate for 14 days.
  - Scott Morrison announces that from midday Monday 23 March all pubs, clubs, restaurants, cinemas and indoor sporting venues across the country will shut down indefinitely in a bid to curb the spread of the coronavirus.
  - The cruise ship Ruby Princess disembarked passengers in Sydney despite several of them, and some crew, showing symptoms of coronavirus. As of 6 April 2020 at least 12 deaths and more than 700 cases of coronavirus in Australia in Australia are now linked to this incident.
  - The 2020 AFL season and 2020 AFL Women's season are suspended due to the COVID-19 pandemic. The 2020 AFL season has been scheduled to resume on 11 June 2020.
- 23 March –
  - As a result of the indefinite closure of venues within the hospitality, tourism, leisure, fitness and entertainment industries, the Centrelink and myGov websites crashed when too many people simultaneously try to apply online for unemployment benefits. Huge lines of newly unemployed people are seen outside Centrelink offices across the country.
  - The Australian Parliament sits to debate and pass an economic stimulus package to attempt to mitigate the economic effect of the COVID-19 pandemic, then adjourns until August 2020.
  - The 2020 NRL season is suspended until 28 May due to the COVID-19 pandemic. Although Queensland has closed its borders, it has made an exemption for players and officials traveling to and from interstate for football. As a biosecurity measure, all players must also be vaccinated against influenza.
- 25 March –
  - From 12pm, Australia required that Australian citizens and permanent residents seek exemptions to leave the country.
- 26 March –
  - From midnight further measures and restrictions on social gatherings and certain businesses are put in place. Weddings will be limited to 5 people including the bride, groom and celebrant. Funerals will be limited to 10 people. All food court seating areas are to be closed. Social gatherings of more than 10 people are discouraged as well as house parties with police to enforce these new restrictions. Auctions that require persons to be present are now banned. Open houses within the property market are now banned. Beauty Parlours, tattoo Parlours and other businesses with the health and beauty industry that require close physical contact between individuals and are not deemed essential are now banned. Hairdressers are exempt from these new measures.
  - Queensland follows other states and territories and closes its borders from midnight. Only those who work in essential services are permitted to enter. Exceptions are made for those who commute to work across the state border, such as residents of Tweed Heads.
- 28 March –
  - 2020 Bundamba state by-election
  - 2020 Currumbin state by-election
- 31 March –
  - From midnight 31 March 2020 new national restrictions to curb the spread of coronavirus are put in place through the Public Health Act 2010, via Sect 7 of the Act, where a Ministerial Order was signed by the Minister for Health, however, as it is only an order and not law it is up to the states and territories as to whether these are enforceable. The new measures include a two-person limit on public gatherings (excluding members of your own household), the banning of all indoor gatherings in households and the closure of playgrounds, skate parks and outdoor gyms.

=== April ===
- 7 April – The High Court unanimously quashes Cardinal George Pell's convictions and substitutes verdicts of acquittal; the Court's summary of its judgment states that there was "a significant possibility that an innocent person has been convicted because the evidence did not establish guilt to the requisite standard of proof".
- 14 April – The City of Wagga Wagga council voted to cut ties with its China's sister city Kunming city, a week later they would vote again joining Kunming as a sister city.
- 19 April – The Competition and Consumer Commission (ACCC) is working to create a mandatory code of conduct that would require Facebook, Google and other tech giants to pay news outlets when they use its content.
- 24 April – Perth Airport blocks runways with bulldozers to pressure Virgin Australia Airlines Pty Ltd to pay its $16 million debt.

=== May ===
- 1 May – South Hedland stabbing attack
- 10 May – Jackie Trad resigns as Deputy Premier and Treasurer of Queensland and is replaced by Steven Miles and Cameron Dick, respectively.
- 19 May – A Queensland man is fined for saving the life of a whale.
- 26 May – Rio Tinto blows up the Juukan Gorge, a region inhabited by Australian Aborigines for 46,000 years, to expand an iron ore mine. The move quickly faces international backlash.
- 28 May – After a 2-month season suspension due to the COVID-19 pandemic, the 2020 NRL season resumes in its third round, with Parramatta Eels defeating Brisbane Broncos 34–6 at Suncorp Stadium.

=== June ===
- 6 June –
  - Protests are held in numerous Australian cities, part of a series of George Floyd protests around the world, with Aboriginal deaths in custody also a focus in the Australian context.
  - Sony Europe, the parent company of Sony Australia, is ordered by the Federal Court of Australia to pay its customers $3.5 million AUD / US$2.4 Million in penalty charges, due to lawmakers saying the company made "false and misleading representations on its website and in dealings with Australian consumers about their Australian Consumer Law (ACL) rights."
- 11 June – The 2020 AFL season resumes with Collingwood taking on Richmond at the MCG.
- 19 June – A large-scale cyber attack against the Australian government is believed to have occurred; Scott Morrison holds a press conference at the Parliament House.
- 26 June – As part of an Australian Security Intelligence Organisation investigation, Australian federal police raided properties of NSW Labor MP Shaoquett Moselmane as part of an investigation into Chinese Communist Party influence in Australian politics.
- 27 June – More than 100 News Corp Australia newspapers are printed for the final time as the company either moves them to an online only format, or closes them completely.

=== July ===
- 1 July – 2020 Eden-Monaro by-election. The Labor party retains the seat after Kristy McBain claimed victory in the by-election with an indicative two-party-preferred vote of 50.4%.
- 8 July –
  - In response to the COVID-19 pandemic, the Victorian capital city of Melbourne and nearby Shire of Mitchell reintroduce stage three restrictions for at least six weeks after a surge in coronavirus case numbers with the majority of new cases stemming from community transmission. All other states and territories introduce strict quarantine measures or deny entry for any incoming travellers who have recently visited Victoria.
  - The border between New South Wales and Victoria is closed for the first time since the 1918–19 Spanish flu pandemic, after an increase in COVID-19 cases in Melbourne.
- 15 July – An increase in COVID-19 community transmission cases in Sydney is traced back to a resident of Melbourne who traveled across the border before the Melbourne stage 3 restrictions came into effect with the initial outbreak arising from a hotel in the Western Sydney suburb of Casula. Despite the rise in case numbers, premier Gladys Berejiklian confirms NSW will not be going back to a lockdown scenario. Several other states and territories introduce strict quarantine measures or deny entry for any incoming travellers who have either recently visited greater Sydney or suburbs within the City of Liverpool, City of Fairfield and City of Campbelltown.
- 16 July – Tara June Winch wins the 2020 Miles Franklin Literary Award for her novel The Yield.
- 17 July – Victoria records 428 new coronavirus cases, the state's highest daily total since the beginning of the pandemic.
- 19 July – With increasing numbers of coronavirus cases in parts of Victoria, Victorian Premier Daniel Andrews advises face coverings will be mandatory for all residents of Melbourne and the Mitchell Shire whenever they leave their homes from Thursday 23 July. Anyone in a public area without a mask will risk a $200 fine.
- 22 July – Australia records 502 new coronavirus cases. The highest number of new cases recorded since the beginning of the pandemic.
- 23 July – Leonard Warwick is found guilty of carrying out the Family Court of Australia attacks in the early 1980s.
- 29 July – CSIRO gave scientific names to 165 new species this year, naming five flies after Marvel Cinematic Universe superheroes: Thor (Daptolestes bronteflavus), Loki (Daptolestes illusiolautus), Black Widow (Daptolestes feminategus), Deadpool (Humorolethalis sergius), and Stan Lee (Daptolestes leei).

=== August ===
- 2 August – Due to the COVID-19 pandemic and escalating numbers of infection rates, especially in the workplace, Victoria declares a state of disaster and stage four restrictions are put in place. This including a police-enforced curfew in metro Melbourne and Mitchell Shire between 8 pm and 5 am, the shutdown of a number of non-essential businesses, exercise only allowed for one hour a day and only one person per household allowed to go shopping once a day and within a 5 km radius of home. As a consequence of rising infection numbers imported from metropolitan Melbourne all other areas of regional Victoria are to enter stage three restrictions previously placed on Melbourne and Mitchell Shire on 5 August.
- 10 August – Parkes Observatory is added to the National Heritage List.
- 12 August – World War II sailor Teddy Sheean is posthumously awarded the Victoria Cross.
- 22 August – 2020 Northern Territory general election: Michael Gunner's Labor government is returned for a second four-year term.

=== September ===
- 2 September – The Australian economy goes into recession for the first time in nearly thirty years, as the country's GDP falls 7 per cent in the June quarter.
- 21 September – Around 250 pilot whales beach themselves at various locations on Tasmania's West Coast near Macquarie Heads. A further 200 whales are stranded two days later, making the event the largest cetacean stranding in Australia's recorded history.
- 25 September – Vincent Namatjira wins the Archibald Prize for his portrait, Stand strong for who you are, a self-portrait with Adam Goodes.
- 27 September – Penrith Panthers win their first minor premiership since 2003 following the final main round of the 2020 NRL season. Brisbane Broncos finish in last position, claiming their first wooden spoon since the club's founding in 1988.

=== October ===
- 4–11 October – The 5th Plenary Council of the Catholic Church in Australia was to be held in response to the report of the Royal Commission into Institutional Responses to Child Sexual Abuse. Both assemblies have since been delayed from their original schedule to 3–10 October 2021 and 4–9 July 2022 due to the COVID-19 pandemic.
- 17 October – 2020 Australian Capital Territory election: Andrew Barr's Labor government is returned for a sixth four-year term.
- 24 October – Richmond Tigers defeat Geelong Cats 12.9 (81) to 7.8 (50) at the 2020 AFL Grand Final at the Gabba, Brisbane.
- 25 October –
  - Melbourne Storm defeat minor premiers Penrith Panthers 26–20 to win the 2020 NRL Grand Final at ANZ Stadium. Storm fullback Ryan Papenhuyzen is awarded the Clive Churchill Medal for Man of the Match. Pre-match entertainment is headlined by Amy Shark, with guest appearances by former INXS members Andrew Farriss and Kirk Pengilly, as well as Blink-182 drummer Travis Barker via livestream.
  - Brisbane Broncos defeat Sydney Roosters 20–10 to win the NRL Women's Premiership Grand Final, winning the title for the third year in a row.
- 31 October – The 2020 Queensland state election is held. Annastacia Palaszczuk's Labor government is returned for a third term with an increased majority.

=== November ===
- 4 November – Queensland defeat New South Wales 18–14 at Adelaide Oval in the first match of the 2020 State of Origin series. Queensland halfback and captain Daly Cherry-Evans is awarded man of the match.
- 11 November – New South Wales defeat Queensland 34–10 at ANZ Stadium in the second match of the 2020 State of Origin series. NSW halfback Nathan Cleary is awarded man of the match.
- 13 November – Queensland defeat New South Wales 24–18 in the 2020 Women's State of Origin match, their first victory since 2014. Queensland five-eighth Tarryn Aiken is awarded the Nellie Doherty Medal for player of the match.
- 18 November – Queensland clinch the 2020 State of Origin series, defeating New South Wales 20–14 at Suncorp Stadium in the third match. Queensland five-eighth Cameron Munster is awarded both man of the match and the Wally Lewis Medal for player of the series.
- 19 November – The Australian Defence Force releases the final report of the inquiry by Justice Paul Brereton into alleged war crimes during the War in Afghanistan. The inquiry found there was credible evidence of 23 incidents of unlawful killings and a further two instances of the war crime of "cruel treatment". The inquiry also found that Australian soldiers summarily executed non-combatants and prisoners.

=== December ===
- 18 December – The 2020 Sydney to Hobart yacht race is cancelled for the first time in its history due to an outbreak of COVID-19 in Sydney, New South Wales, as the Tasmanian government declared Greater Sydney a "medium risk" zone, which would require all participants to quarantine for 14 days on arrival in Tasmania.
- 19 December – In response to a COVID-19 outbreak in the Northern Beaches area of Sydney, all other states and territories close their borders to all residents of greater Sydney, throwing interstate travel plans into chaos for those intent on visiting or leaving greater Sydney. The Northern Territory later relaxes its border restriction.
- 21 December – The final report from the inquiry into Victoria's botched hotel quarantine program which led to a second wave of COVID-19 in Victoria and over 800 deaths is released. The report is unable to determine who commissioned the use of private security and criticises the Andrews Government for failing to do "proper analysis" of the plan.

== Arts and literature ==
- Tara June Winch wins the Miles Franklin Literary Award for the novel The Yield and the Best Novel Award at the Prime Minister's Literary Awards

== Deaths ==
=== January ===
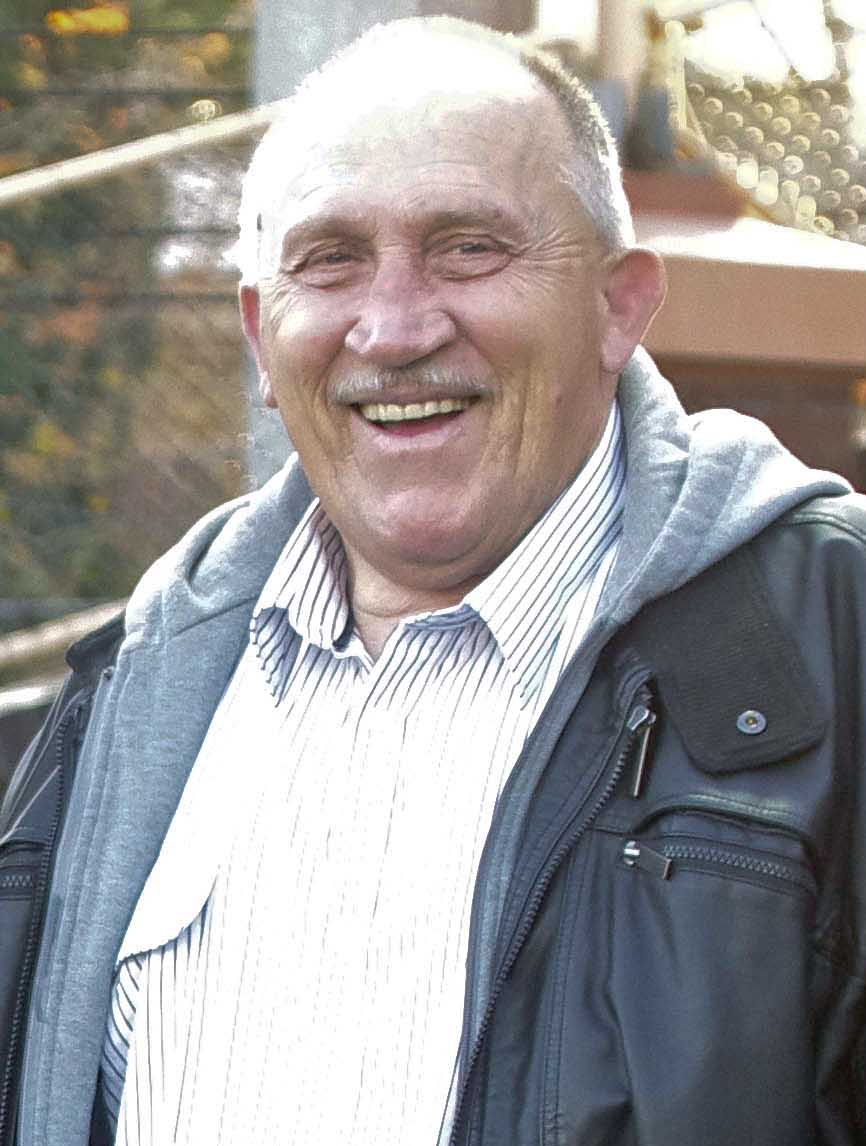
Mark Harris

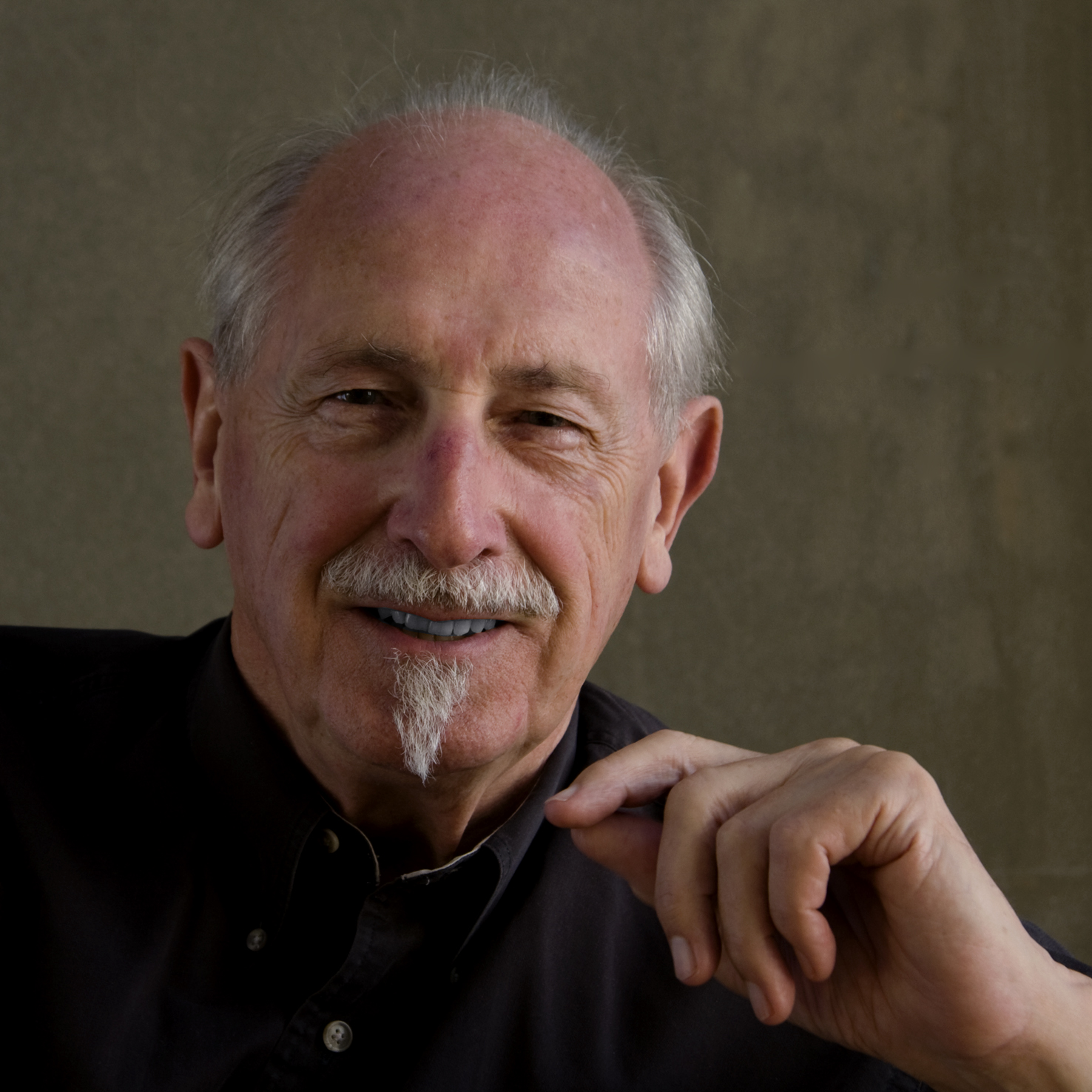
Barry Tuckwell

Manfred Clynes

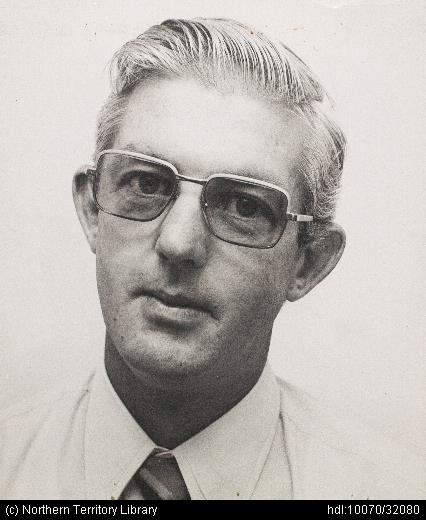
Ian Tuxworth

- 1 January
  - Alexander Frater, travel writer and journalist (b. 1937)
  - Barry McDonald, rugby union player (b. 1940)
- 4 January – Tom Long, actor (b. 1968)
- 6 January – Timoshenko Aslanides, poet (b. 1943)
- 7 January – Phil O'Neill, New South Wales politician (b. 1941)
- 8 January – Pat Dalton, Australian rules footballer (Perth) (b. 1942)
- 9 January
  - Annette Bezor, painter and feminist (b. 1950)
  - Geoff Wilson, nuclear physicist (b. 1938)
- 10 January – Brian James, rugby league footballer (b. 1943)
- 13 January
  - Digby Moran, artist (b. 1948)
  - Doug Shedden, New South Wales politician (b. 1937)
- 14 January – Tony Beddison, businessman and philanthropist (b. 1948)
- 15 January
  - Mark Harris, rugby league footballer (b. 1947)
  - Victor Salvemini, Paralympic athlete (b. 1946)
  - Ben Swane, nurseryman (b. 1927)
- 16 January – Barry Tuckwell, horn player and conductor (b. 1931)
- 17 January – Grant Goldman, radio announcer (b. 1950)
- 19 January
  - Manfred Clynes, scientist, inventor and musician (died in the United States) (b. 1925)
  - David Leach, former Chief of the Naval Staff (b. 1928)
  - James Mollison, art gallery director (b. 1931)
- 20 January – Steph Bowe, author and blogger (b. 1994)
- 21 January – Ian Tuxworth, 2nd Chief Minister of the Northern Territory (b. 1942)
- 22 January – John Douglas Morrison, police officer (b. 1934)
- 23 January – Peter Salama, epidemiologist (died in Switzerland) (b. 1968)
- 27 January – Eva Marks, Holocaust survivor (born in Austria) (b. 1932)
- 28 January – Irwin Lewis, Indigenous artist (b. 1939)
- 29 January – Mike Dancis, basketball player (born in Latvia) (b. 1939)
- 30 January – Richard Hunstead, astronomer (b. 1943)
- 31 January – James Dunn, diplomat (b. 1928)

=== February ===
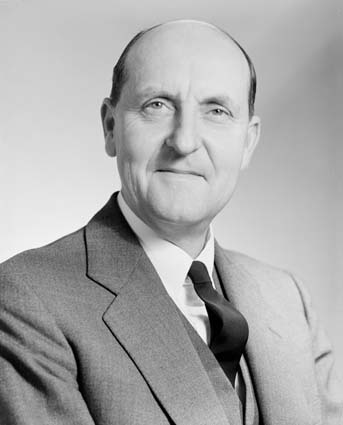
Sir Lenox Hewitt

- 6 February – Greg Hawick, rugby league footballer (b. 1932)
- 8 February – Lew Mander, organic chemist (born in New Zealand) (b. 1939)
- 10 February – John Smith, cricketer (b. 1936)
- 11 February – Ron Haddrick, cricketer and actor (b. 1929)
- 13 February – Ronne Arnold, dancer, choreographer and actor (b. 1938)
- 16 February – Zoe Caldwell, actress (died in the United States) (b. 1933)
- 22 February – June Dally-Watkins, model, businesswoman and etiquette coach (b. 1927)
- 24 February – Don Furner, rugby league footballer (b. 1932)
- 25 February
  - Adam Maher, rugby league footballer (b. 1972)
  - Raymond Martin, chemist (b. 1926)
- 26 February – Stroma Buttrose, architect and town planner (b. 1929)
- 28 February – Sir Lenox Hewitt, public servant (b. 1917)
- 29 February – Eleanor Martin, dancer (b. 1951)

=== March ===
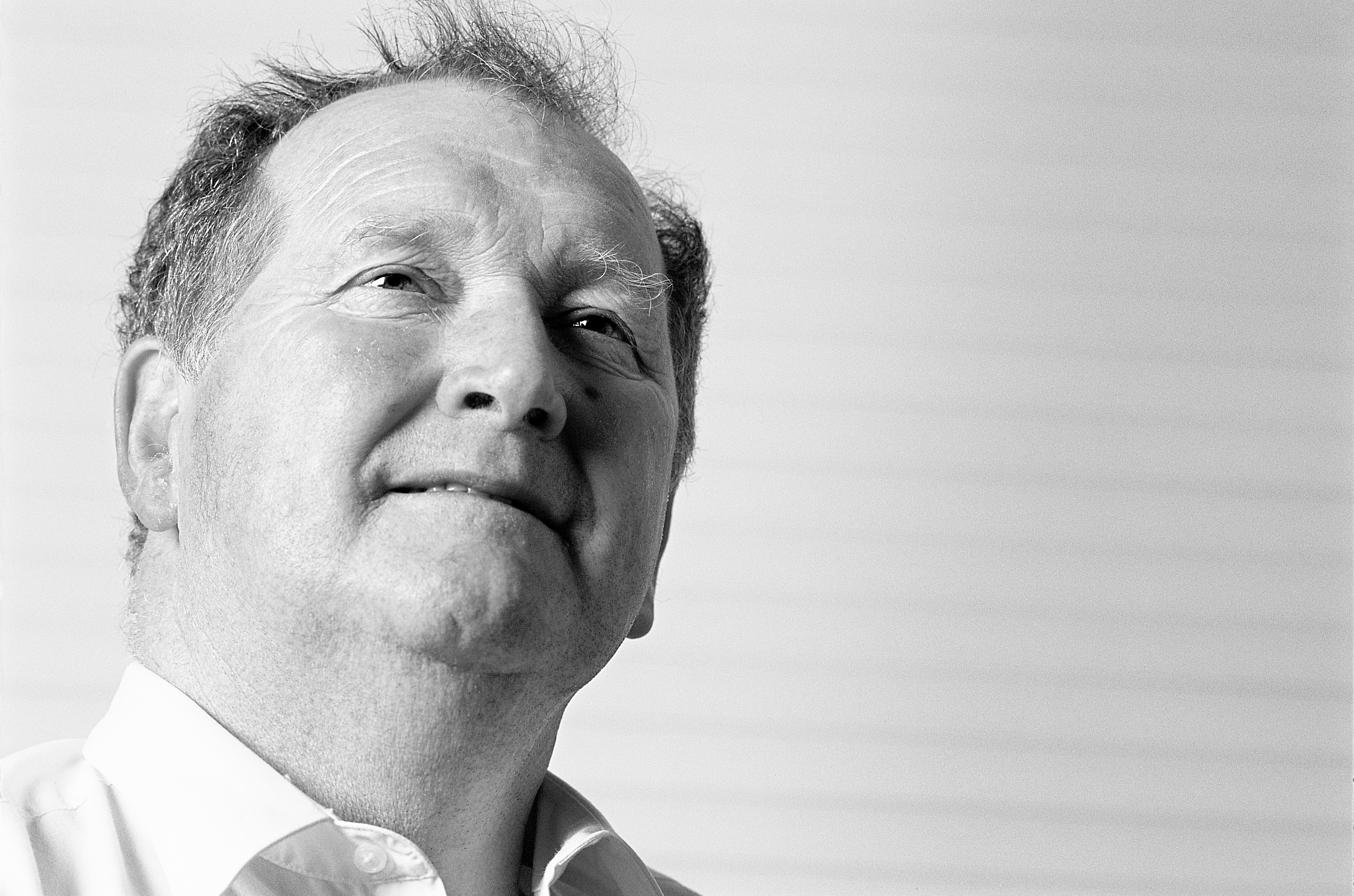
Ray Wedgwood

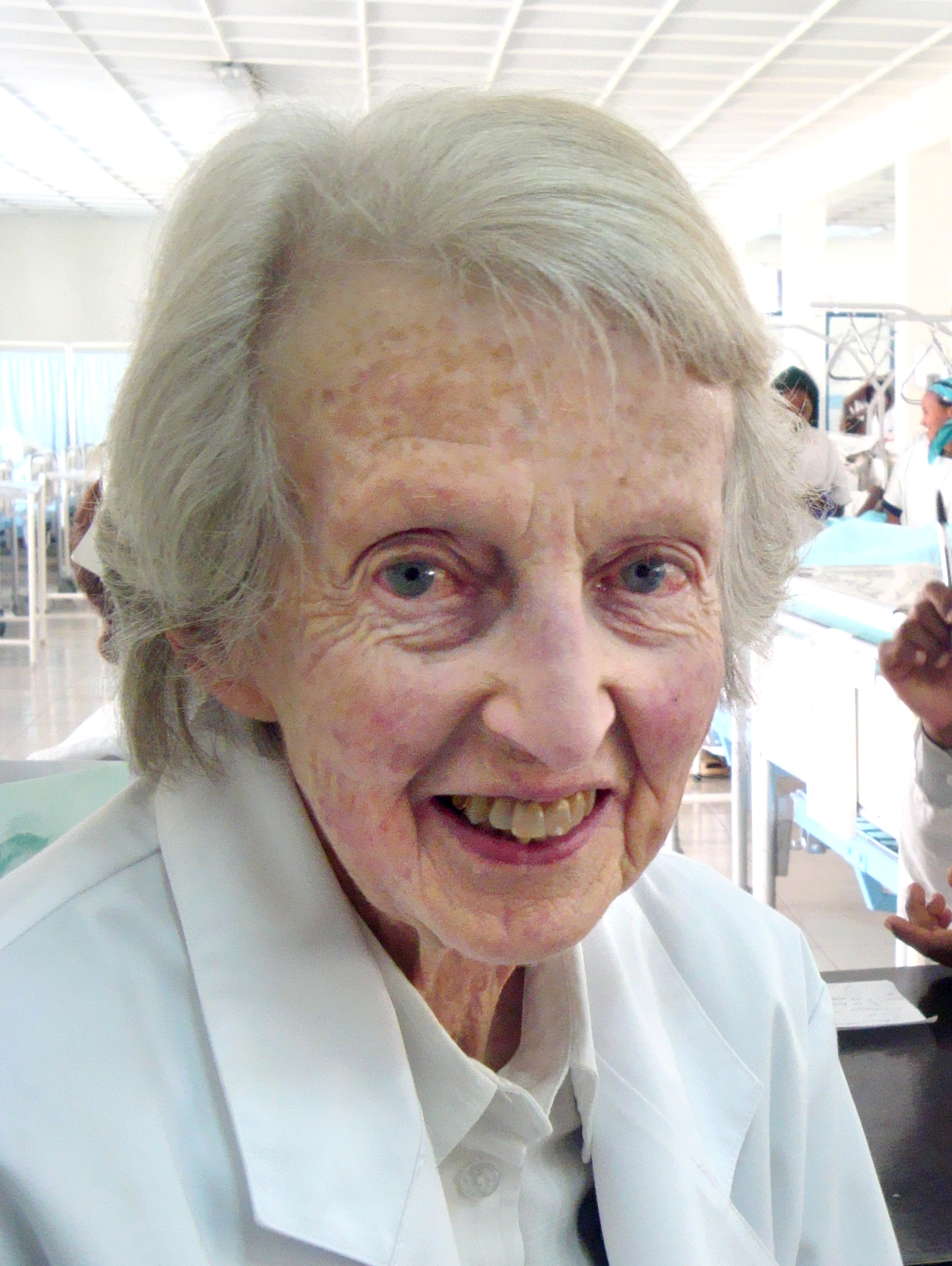
Catherine Hamlin

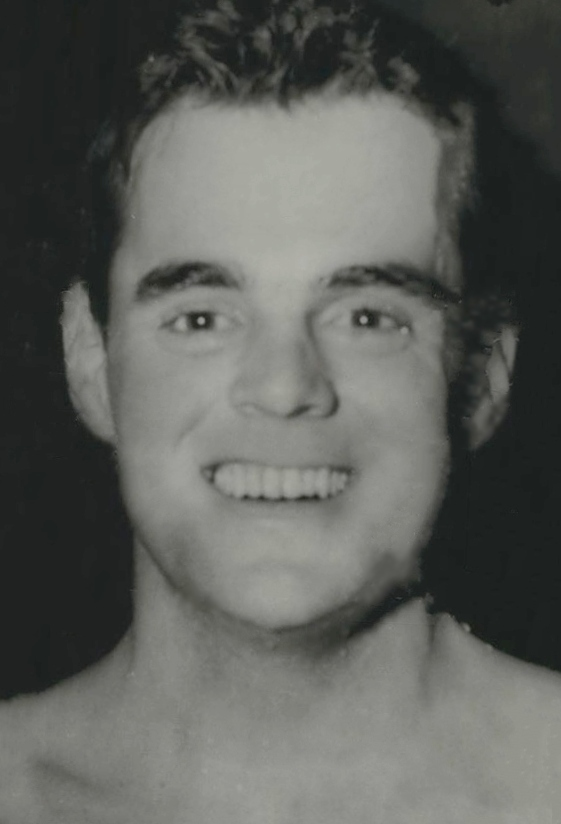
John Davies

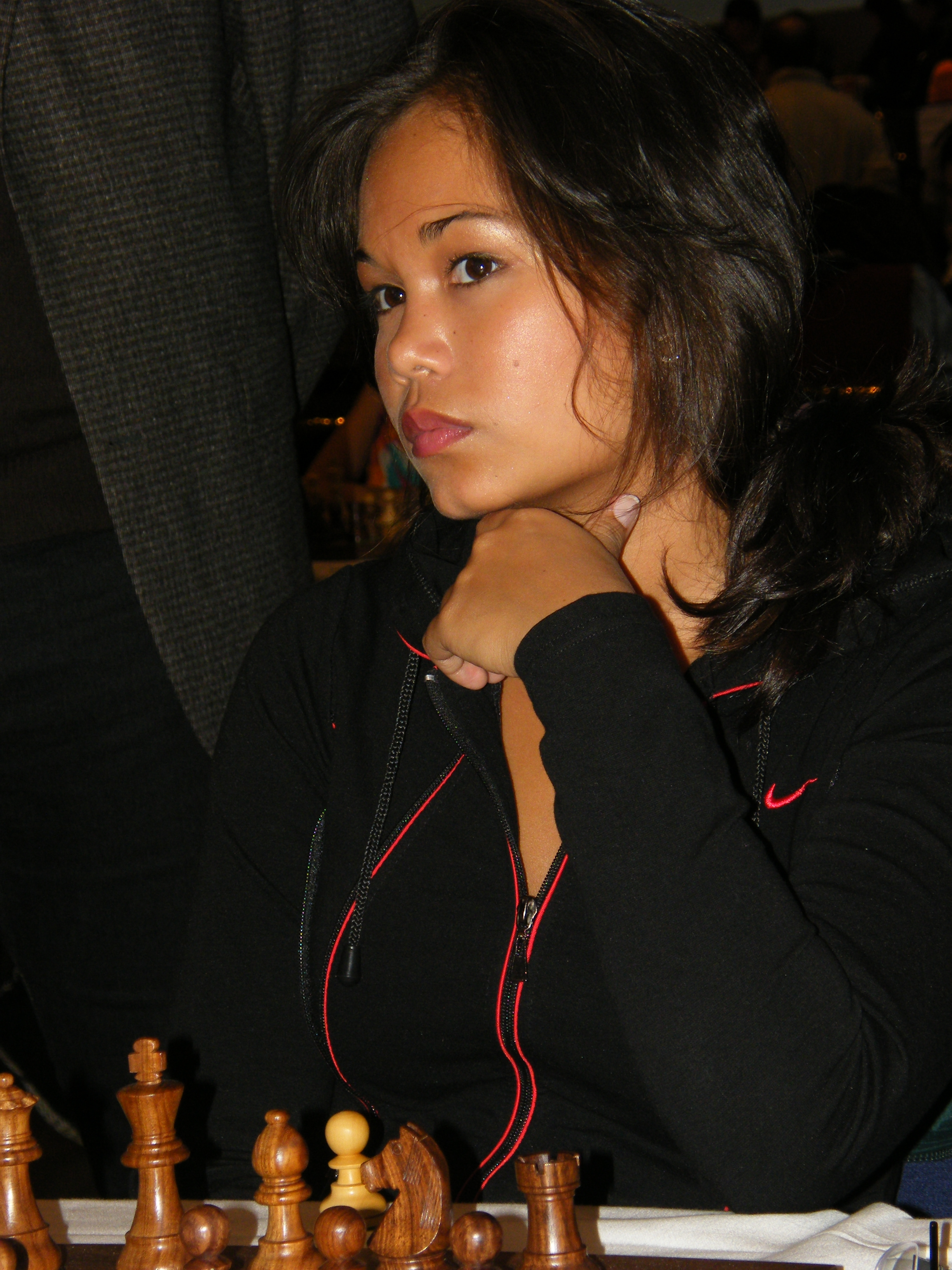
Arianne Caoili

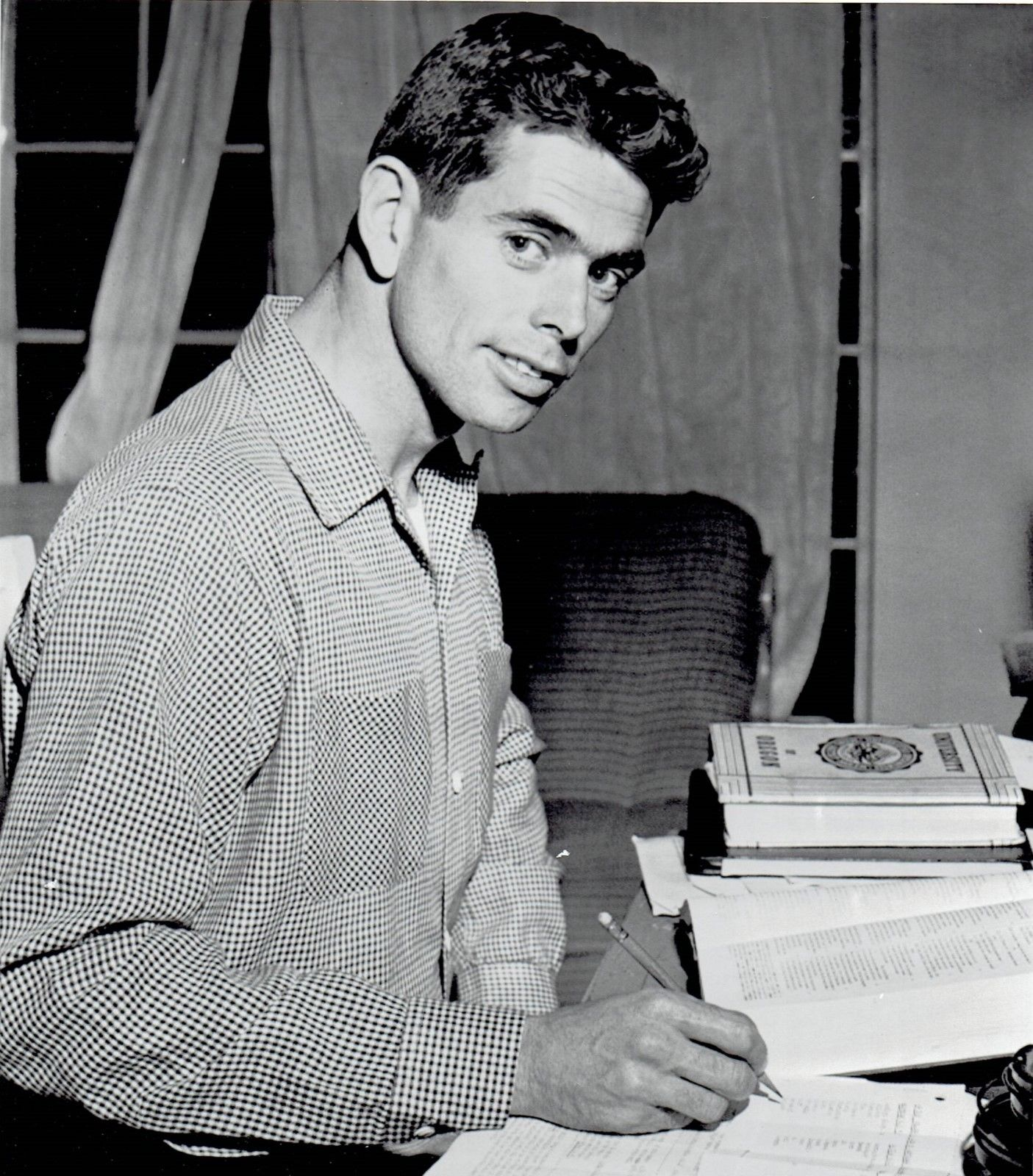
Jim Bailey

- 1 March – May Lorna O'Brien, educator and author (b. 1932)
- 2 March – Bob Christie, New South Wales politician (b. 1925)
- 4 March
  - Ivan Lee, Anglican bishop (b. 1955 or 1956)
  - Bill Young, Australian rules footballer (St Kilda) (b. 1931)
- 5 March – Ray Wedgwood, engineer (b. 1942)
- 6 March – Silvia Smith, Tasmanian politician (b. 1939)
- 7 March – Eremein, thoroughbred (b. 2001)
- 9 March
  - John Bathersby, Catholic bishop (b. 1936)
  - John Schneebichler, Australian rules footballer (b. 1958)
- 10 March – Sanford Wheeler, Australian rules footballer (died in the United States) (b. 1970)
- 12 March
  - Kevin Bacon, Olympic equestrian (b. 1932)
  - Don Burrows, jazz musician (b. 1928)
- 16 March
  - Saskia Post, actress (b. 1961)
  - Susan R. Wilson, statistician (b. 1948)
- 17 March – Helen Isobel Aston, botanist (b. 1934)
- 18 March
  - Catherine Hamlin, obstetrician and gynaecologist (b. 1924)
  - John Solomon, rugby union player (b. 1929)
- 20 March – Denise Bradley, academic administrator (b. 1942)
- 23 March – Keith Remington, Victorian politician (b. 1923)
- 24 March
  - John Davies, Olympic swimmer and judge (died in the United States) (b. 1929)
  - Jack Jones, Australian rules footballer (b. 1924)
  - Ian Reay Mackay, immunologist (b. 1922)
  - Tom McNeil, Western Australian politician and Australian rules footballer (St. Kilda) (born in the United Kingdom) (b. 1929)
- 26 March
  - John Hyde, Australian rules footballer (Geelong) (b. 1930)
  - Carl Kirkwood, Victorian politician (born in the United Kingdom) (b. 1929)
  - Michael J. Tyler, herpetologist (born in the United Kingdom) (b. 1937)
- 28 March – George Corones, swimmer (b. 1918)
- 30 March
  - Arianne Caoili, chess player (born in the Philippines) (b. 1986)
  - Milutin Knežević, Bishop of the Eparchy of Australia and New Zealand (died in Serbia) (b. 1949)
- 31 March – Jim Bailey, Olympic athlete (died in the United States) (b. 1929)

=== April ===
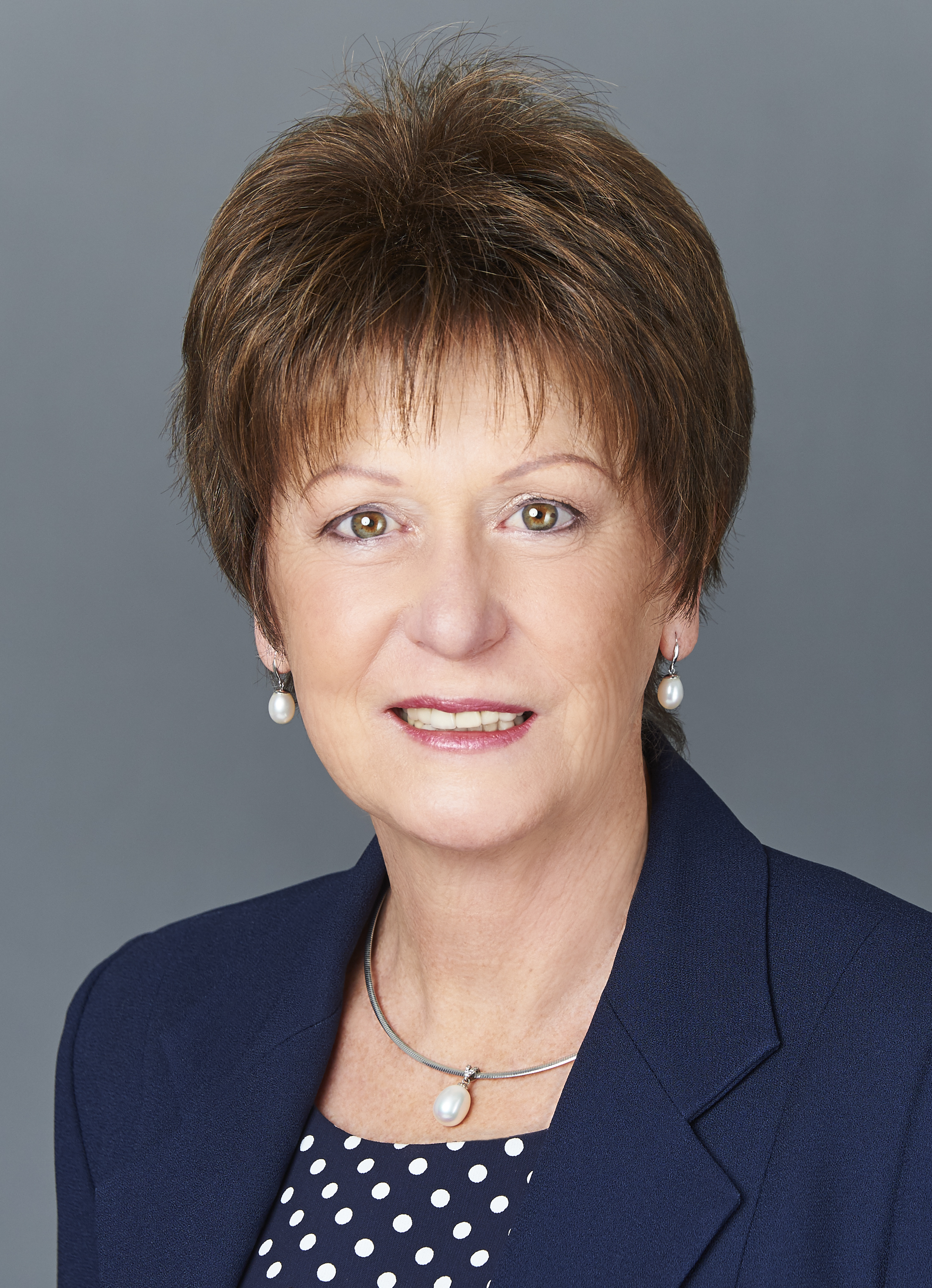
Andrea Mitchell

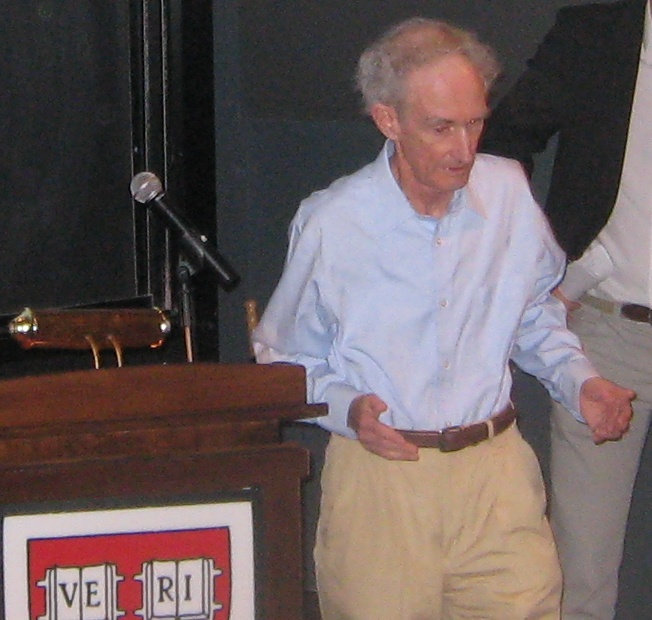
Robert May, Baron May of Oxford

- 1 April
  - Tony Anderson, Australian rules footballer (Melbourne) (b. 1942)
  - Bruce Dawe, poet (b. 1930)
- 2 April – Ron Graham, character actor (b. 1926)
- 4 April
  - Brian Falconer, Australian rules footballer (Hawthorn) (b. 1933)
  - Andrea Mitchell, Western Australian politician and sports administrator (b. 1956)
- 5 April
  - Barry Downs, Olympic sports shooter (b. 1930)
  - George Ogilvie, film and theatre director (b. 1931)
- 6 April
  - Bruce Gonsalves, Australian rules footballer (Collingwood) (b. 1956)
  - Quenton Leach, Australian rules footballer (Fremantle) (b. 1972)
- 7 April – Jim Clarko, Western Australian politician (b. 1932)
- 9 April – Jacqueline Mason, Olympic pair skater (b. 1935)
- 10 April – Roy Watson, cricketer (b. 1933)
- 11 April
  - Michael Bowden, Australian rules footballer (Richmond) (b. 1947)
  - Might and Power, racehorse (foaled in New Zealand) (b. 1993)
- 12 April – Ted Evans, Treasury Secretary (b. 1941)
- 16 April
  - Brian Kyme, Anglican bishop (b. 1935)
  - Bruce Murray, Australian rules footballer (South Melbourne) and cricketer (b. 1929)
- 17 April – Patricia Kailis, businesswoman, neurologist and geneticist (b. 1933)
- 20 April – Alan Clough, Australian rules footballer (Footscray) (b. 1932)
- 22 April – James Hoggan, Paralympian athlete (b. 1959)
- 24 April – Graeme Watson, cricketer (b. 1945)
- 26 April – Brian Barclay, Australian rules footballer (Fitzroy) (b. 1938)
- 27 April – Ian Causley, New South Wales politician (b. 1940)
- 28 April
  - Robert May, Baron May of Oxford, scientist (b. 1936)
  - Brian Richardson, cricketer (b. 1932)

=== May ===
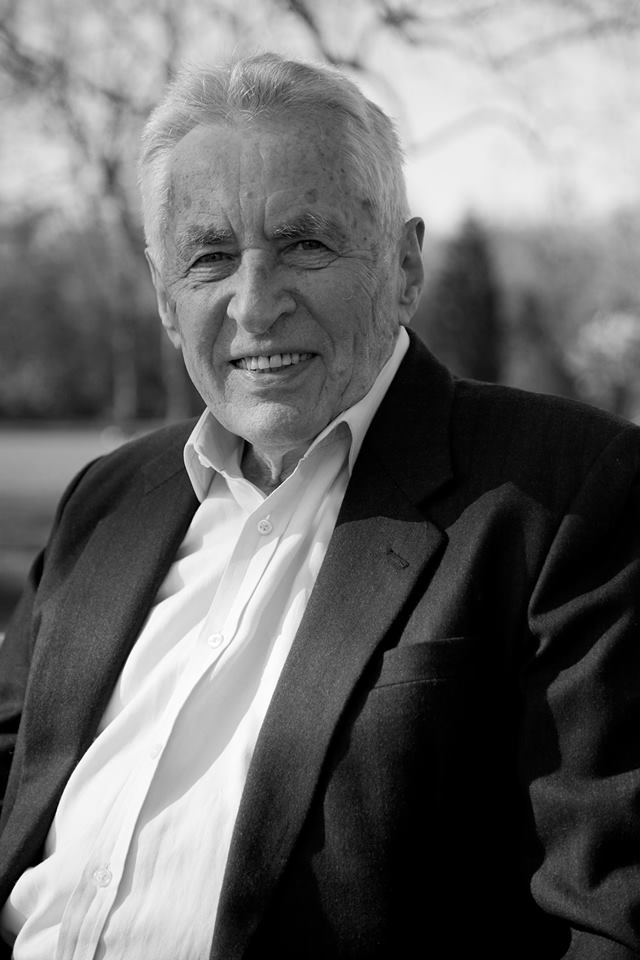
George Mikell

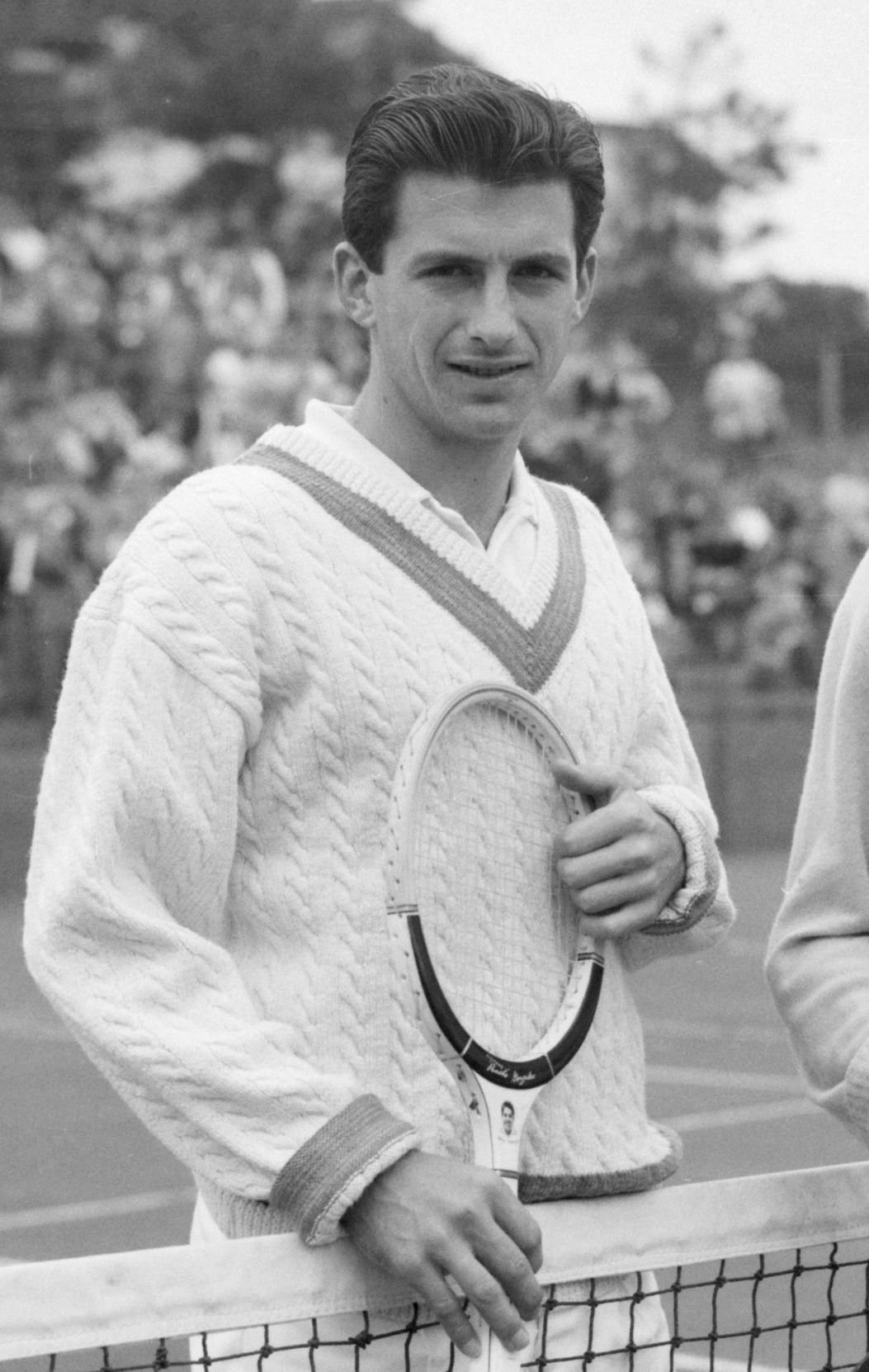
Ashley Cooper

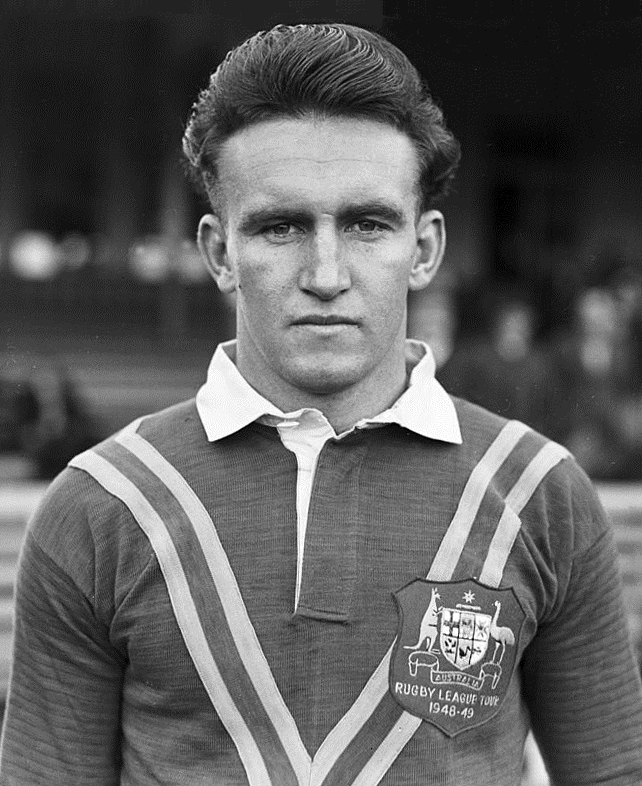
Bobby Dimond

- 1 May – Deb Foskey, Australian Capital Territory politician (b. 1949)
- 5 May – Max Crellin, Victorian politician (b. 1933)
- 6 May – Darby McCarthy, jockey (b. 1944)
- 7 May – Margaret Loutit, microbiologist (died in New Zealand) (b. 1929)
- 9 May – Arthur Dignam, actor (b. 1939)
- 10 May – Jack Mundey, trade union leader and environmental activist (b. 1929)
- 12 May
  - John Beattie, Tasmanian politician (b. 1932)
  - George Mikell, actor and writer (born in Lithuania and died in the United Kingdom) (b. 1929)
  - Farzad Sharifian, linguist (born in Iran) (b. 1964)
- 13 May
  - Francis Andersen, scholar (b. 1925)
  - Keith Lyons, sport scientist (born in the United Kingdom) (b. 1952)
  - John O'Brien, Olympic water polo player (b. 1931)
- 14 May – Ray Land, Olympic sprinter (b. 1930)
- 16 May – Arthur Summons, dual-code rugby international (b. 1935)
- 20 May
  - Trevor Stewart, cricketer (b. 1940)
  - Hector Thompson, boxer (b. 1949)
- 22 May
  - Peter Harold Cole, electrical engineer (b. 1936)
  - Ashley Cooper, tennis player (b. 1936)
- 24 May – Bruce Reid, Victorian politician (b. 1935)
- 26 May – Geoff Kerr, Australian rules footballer (St Kilda) (b. 1925)
- 28 May
  - Jock Blair, television writer and producer (b. 1942)
  - Jim Brown, Western Australian politician (b. 1927)
- 30 May
  - John Cole, geographer (died in the United Kingdom) (b. 1928)
  - Bobby Dimond, rugby league footballer (b. 1930)
  - Bob Hammond, footballer and coach (b. 1942)

=== June ===
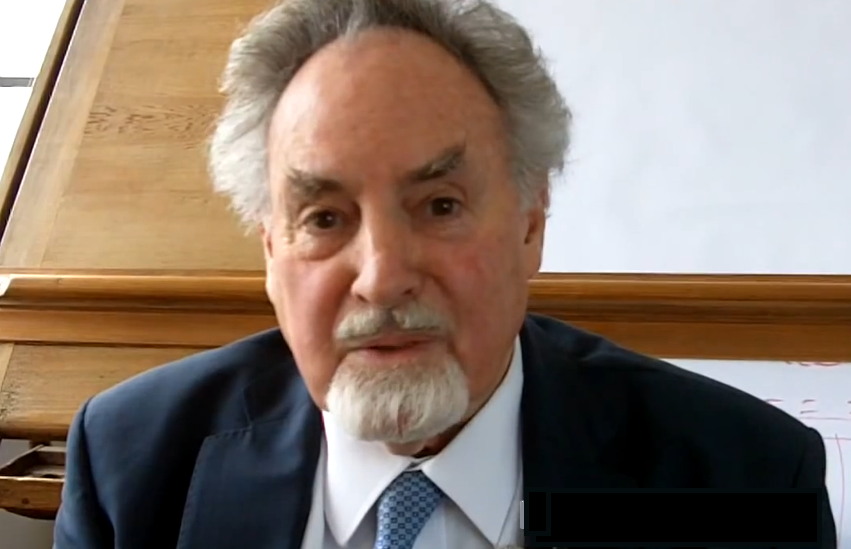
Geoffrey Burnstock

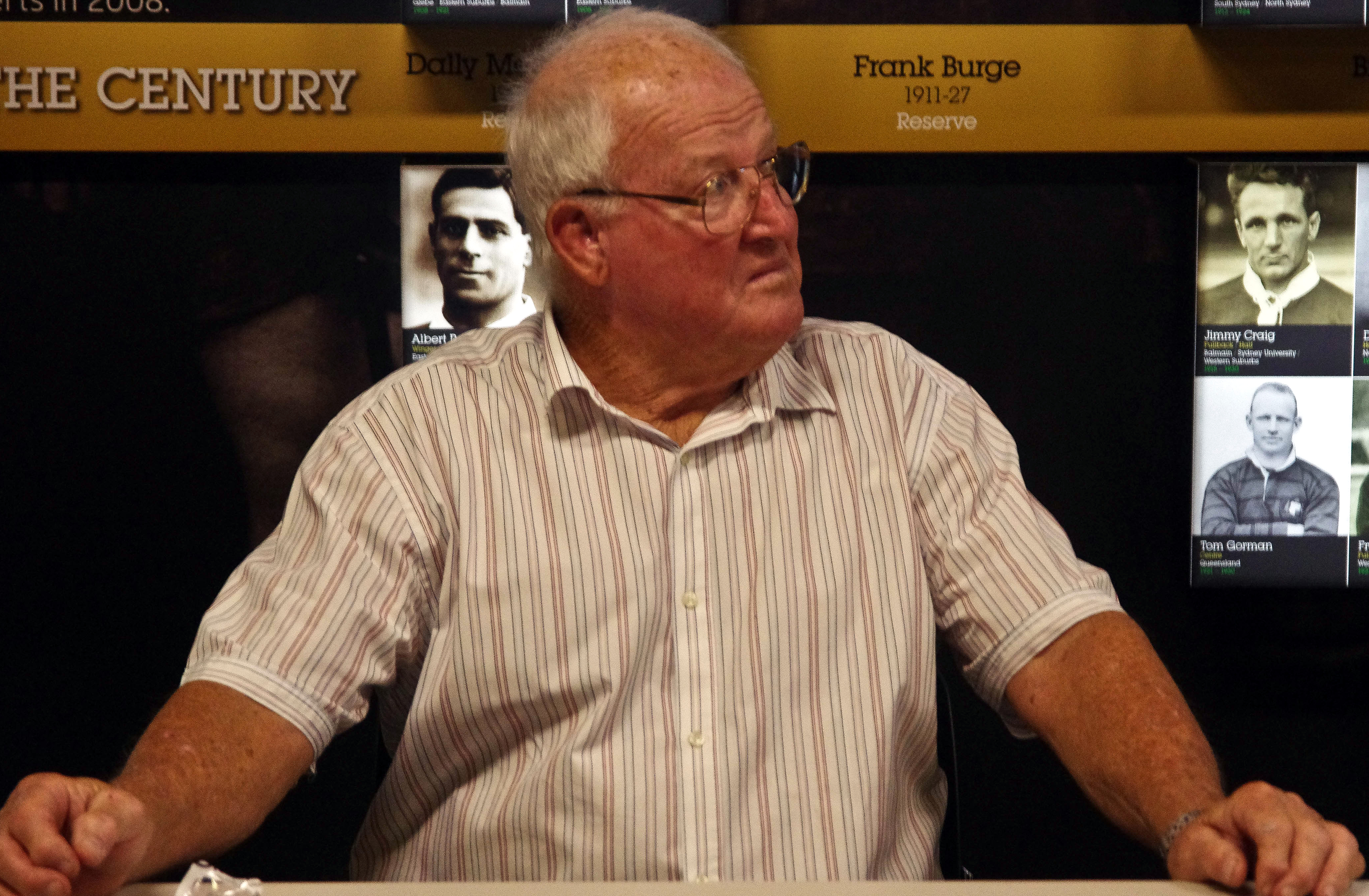
Noel Kelly

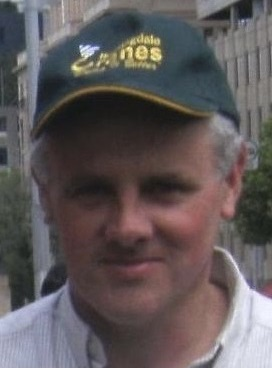
John Madigan

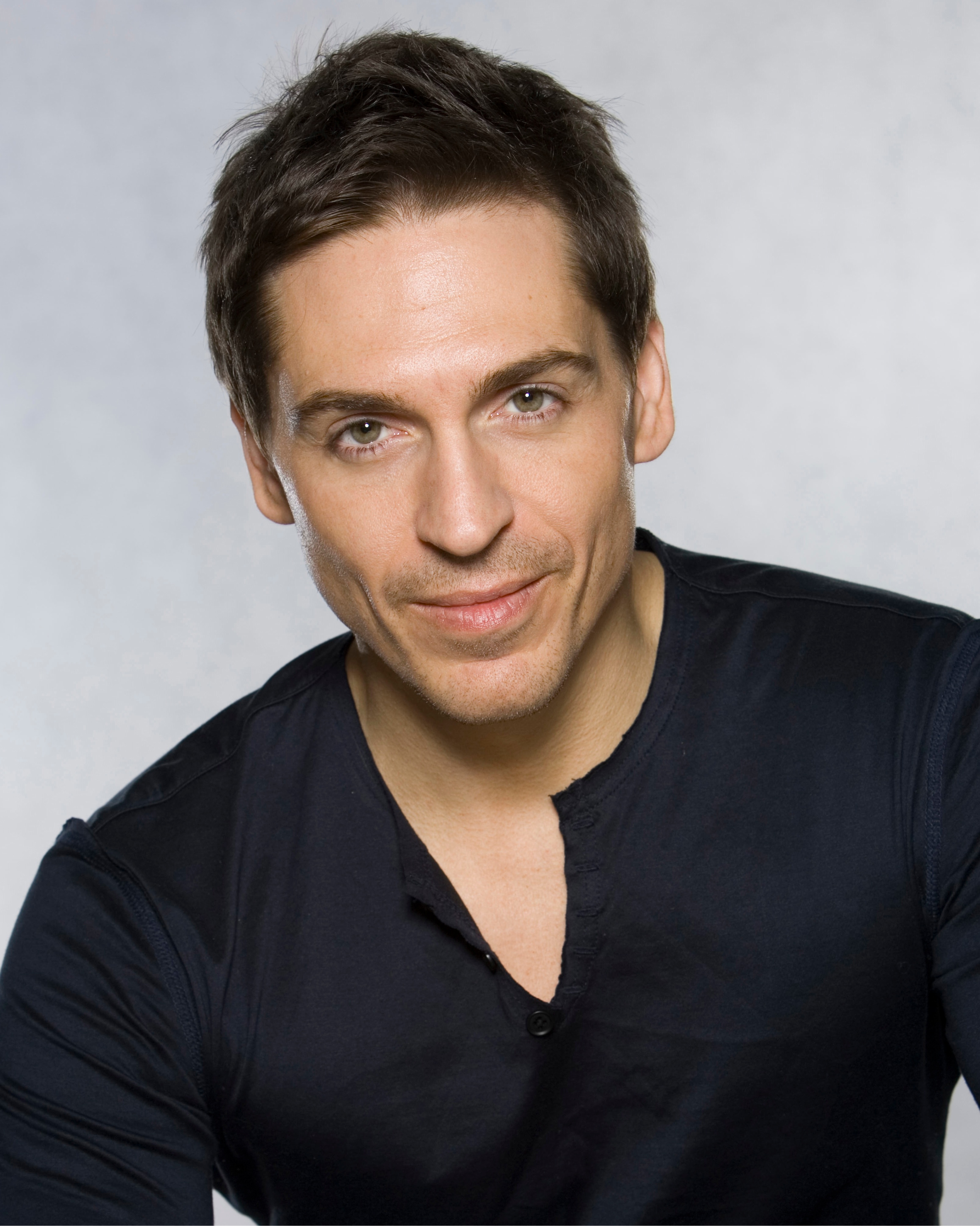
Michael Falzon

- 1 June – Douglas Rolfe, cricketer (b. 1953)
- 2 June
  - Geoffrey Burnstock, neurobiologist (born in the United Kingdom) (b. 1929)
  - John Cuneo, Olympic sailor (b. 1928)
  - Desmond Charles Moore, Catholic bishop (b. 1926)
- 5 June – Andrew Riemer, literary critic and author (b. 1936)
- 8 June – Maggie Fitzgibbon, actress and singer (b. 1929)
- 10 June – Jesse Blackadder, novelist, screenwriter and journalist (b. 1964)
- 11 June – Sir Clem Renouf, Rotary International president (b. 1921)
- 12 June – Geoffrey Martin, Australian rules footballer (b. 1927)
- 14 June
  - Don Candy, tennis player (b. 1929)
  - Noel Kelly, rugby league footballer (b. 1936)
- 16 June – John Madigan, Victorian politician (b. 1966)
- 17 June – Harold David Anderson, public servant and diplomat (b. 1923)
- 19 June
  - Malcolm Brooks, New South Wales politician (b. 1930)
  - Kevin Leahy, Western Australian politician (b. 1949)
- 20 June – John White, Tasmanian politician (b. 1942)
- 21 June
  - Manny Santos, Olympic weightlifter (b. 1935)
  - Sam Sarin, fisherman (born in Yugoslavia) (b. 1936)
- 23 June – Michael Falzon, musical theatre actor (b. 1972)
- 24 June – Roger Johnston, Victorian politician (b. 1930)
- 25 June
  - Owen Harries, academic and magazine editor (born in the United Kingdom) (b. 1930)
  - John Kennedy Sr., Australian rules football player and coach (Hawthorn, North Melbourne) (b. 1928)
- 28 June – Matthew Morris, New South Wales politician (b. 1969)
- 29 June
  - Kevin Pay, Australian rules footballer (Collingwood) (b. 1939)
  - Ken Shadie, screenwriter (b. 1935)
  - Fredrick Töben, author and Holocaust denier (born in Germany) (b. 1944)

=== July ===
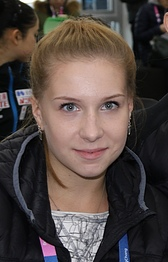
Ekaterina Alexandrovskaya

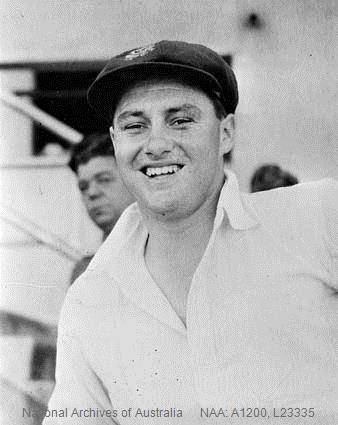
Barry Jarman

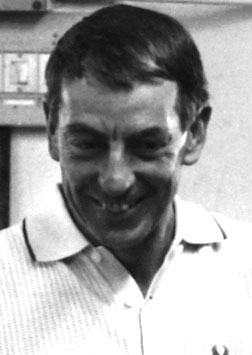
Ron Tauranac

- 1 July – Ian MacDougall, naval officer (b. 1938)
- 3 July – Bob Gleeson, Australian rules footballer (Richmond) (b. 1931)
- 4 July – Kevin Wickham, Olympic rower (b. 1939)
- 6 July – Mark Naley, Australian rules footballer (Carlton) (b. 1961)
- 7 July – Elizabeth Harrower, author (b. 1928)
- 8 July – Alex Pullin, Olympic snowboarder (b. 1987)
- 10 July – Ben Acton, Olympic ice hockey player (b. 1927)
- 12 July – Jack Ah Kit, Northern Territory politician (b. 1950)
- 13 July – Ian Black, Australian Capital Territory politician (b. 1943)
- 14 July – John Schaeffer, art collector (b. 1941)
- 15 July – Nigel Murch, cricketer (b. 1944)
- 16 July – Norm Neeson, Australian rules footballer (North Melbourne) (b. 1934)
- 17 July
  - Ekaterina Alexandrovskaya, Olympic pair skater (born and died in Russia) (b. 2000)
  - Dominic Foreman, South Australian politician (b. 1933)
  - Barry Jarman, Test cricketer (b. 1936)
  - Thomas O'Regan, media theorist and academic (b. 1956)
  - Ron Tauranac, engineer and racing car designer (b. 1925)
- 18 July – Colin Mason, New South Wales politician (born in New Zealand) (b. 1926)
- 19 July – Cor Fuhler, musician (born in the Netherlands) (b. 1964)
- 20 July
  - Shane Tuck, Australian rules footballer (Richmond) (b. 1981)
  - Geoff Williams, Australian rules footballer (Geelong) (b. 1930)
- 21 July
  - Margaret McIver, Olympic equestrian (b. 1933)
  - Bob Wallace, athlete (died in the United States) (b. 1951)
- 23 July – John Bradbury, Australian rules footballer (Footscray) (b. 1941)
- 25 July – Peter Bowler, lexicographer (b. 1934)
- 27 July – Terry Waters, Australian rules footballer (Collingwood) (b. 1943)
- 29 July – David Ramsay, politician (died in Canada) (b. 1948)

=== August ===
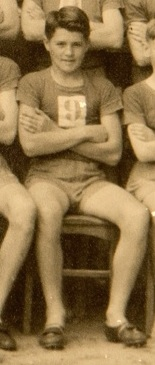
Dick Tooth

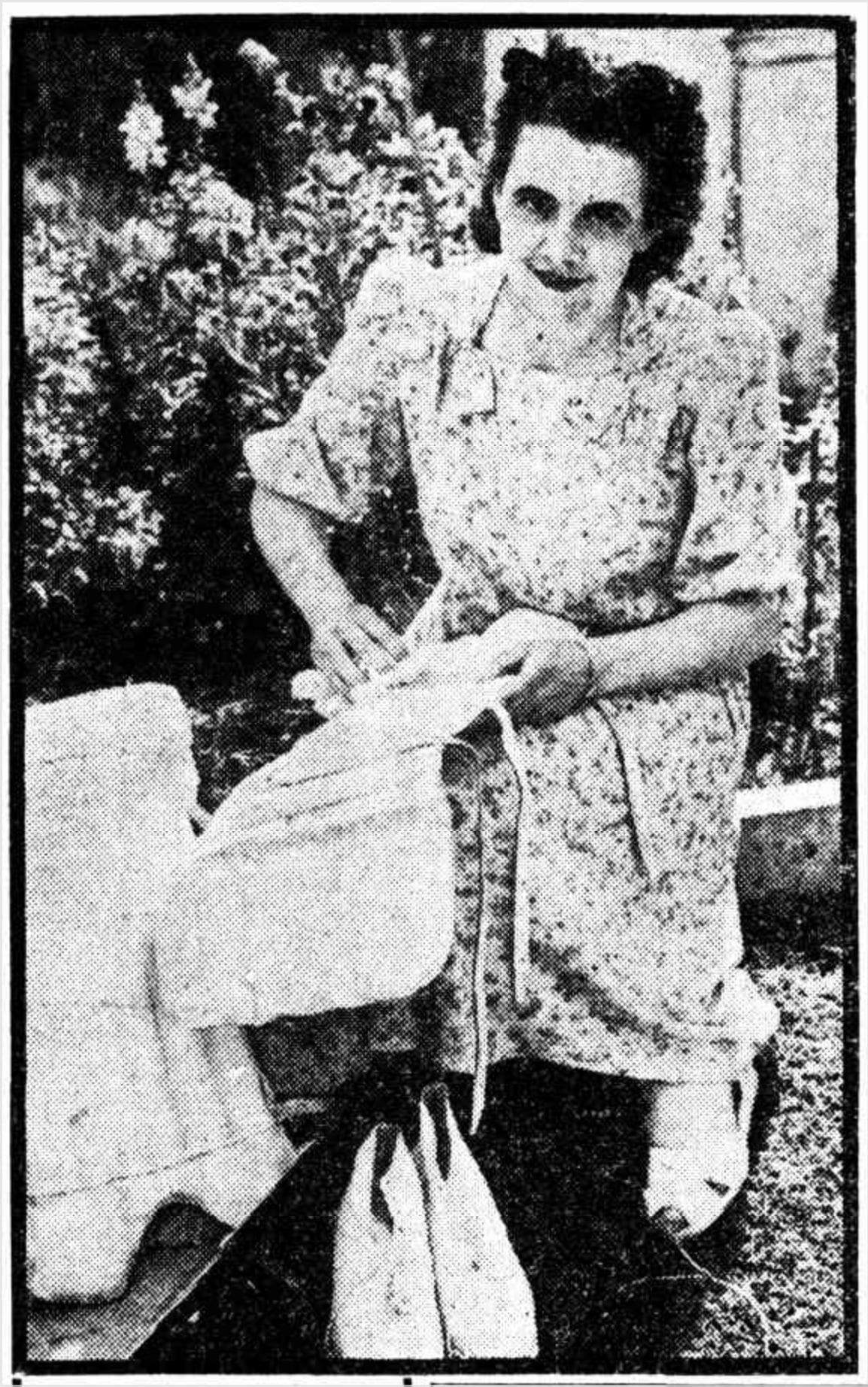
Lorna Beal

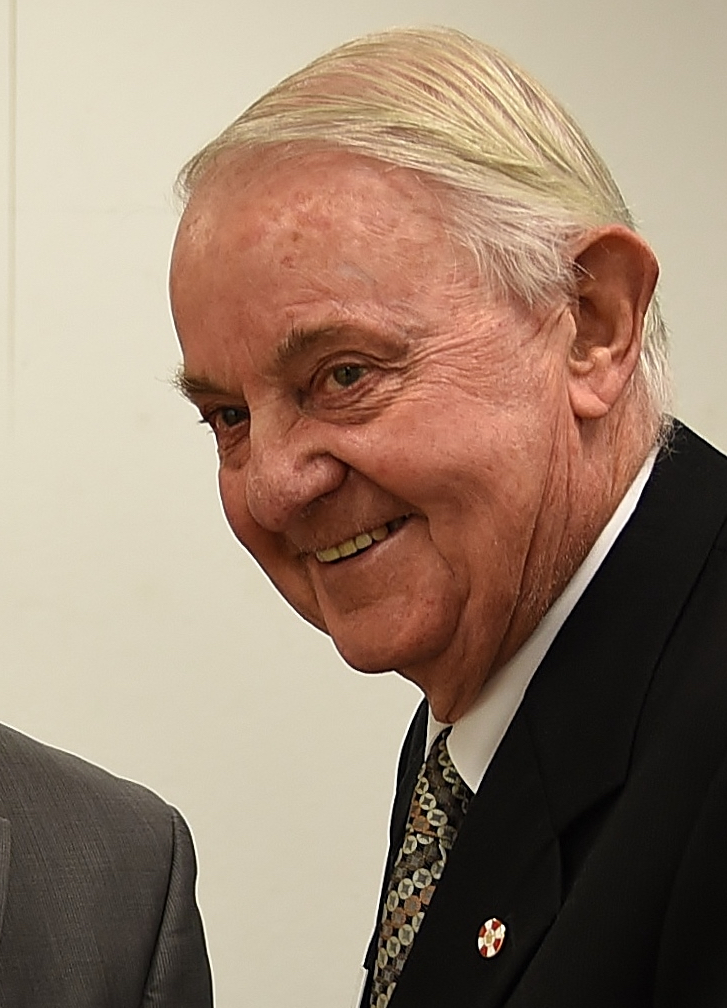
Sir Bob Elliott

- 1 August
  - Wendy Blunsden, cricketer (b. 1942)
  - David Darcy, Australian rules footballer (Footscray) (b. 1943)
  - Ross Warner, rugby league footballer (b. 1943)
- 2 August – Antony F. Campbell, scholar (born in New Zealand) (b. 1934)
- 3 August – Goldie Alexander, author (b. 1936)
- 5 August – Dick Tooth, rugby union player (b. 1929)
- 10 August – Lorna Beal, cricketer (b. 1923)
- 12 August
  - Gordon Yea, Australian rules footballer (North Melbourne) (b. 1924)
  - Adrian Young, Australian rules footballer (St Kilda) (b. 1943)
- 13 August
  - Frank Brew, Australian rules footballer (South Melbourne) (b. 1927)
  - Daryl Gutterson, Australian rules footballer (Carlton) (b. 1953)
  - Phil O'Brien, Australian rules footballer (Hawthorn) (b. 1930)
- 14 August – William Davies, Olympic wrestler (b. 1931)
- 15 August – Chilla Porter, Olympic high jumper (b. 1936)
- 17 August – Fred Clarke, Australian rules footballer (Richmond) (b. 1932)
- 21 August
  - Sir Bob Elliott, medical researcher (died in New Zealand) (b. 1934)
  - Ron Tudor, music producer, label owner and record industry executive (b. 1924)
- 22 August
  - John Bangsund, science-fiction fan (b. 1939)
  - Ted Grace, New South Wales politician (b. 1931)
  - John Green, Tasmanian politician (b. 1945)
- 24 August – Bill Stephen, Australian rules footballer (Fitzroy) (b. 1928)
- 24 August – Mal Pascoe, Australian rules footballer (Essendon) (b. 1933)
- 25 August
  - Mick Hart, folk musician (b. 1969 or 1970)
  - Neil Sachse, Australian rules footballer and disability advocate (Footscray) (b. 1951)
- 26 August – Geraldine Dillon, culinary expert and television chef (b. 1936)
- 27 August
  - Tony Fletcher, Tasmanian politician (b. 1934)
  - Clarrie Jeffreys, rugby league footballer and coach (b. 1932)
  - Barry Stuart, Olympic canoeist (b. 1934)
- 28 August – Lou Westende, Australian Capital Territory politician (born in the Netherlands) (b. 1925)
- 29 August – Subzero, racehorse, Melbourne Cup winner (1992) (b. 1988)
- 31 August – Jack Danzey, rugby league footballer (b. 1939)

=== September ===
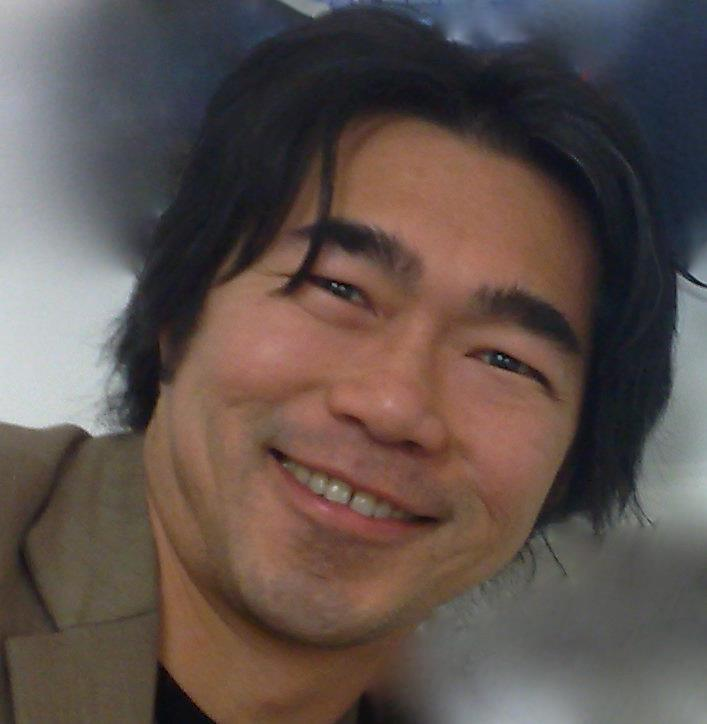
Sonny Chua

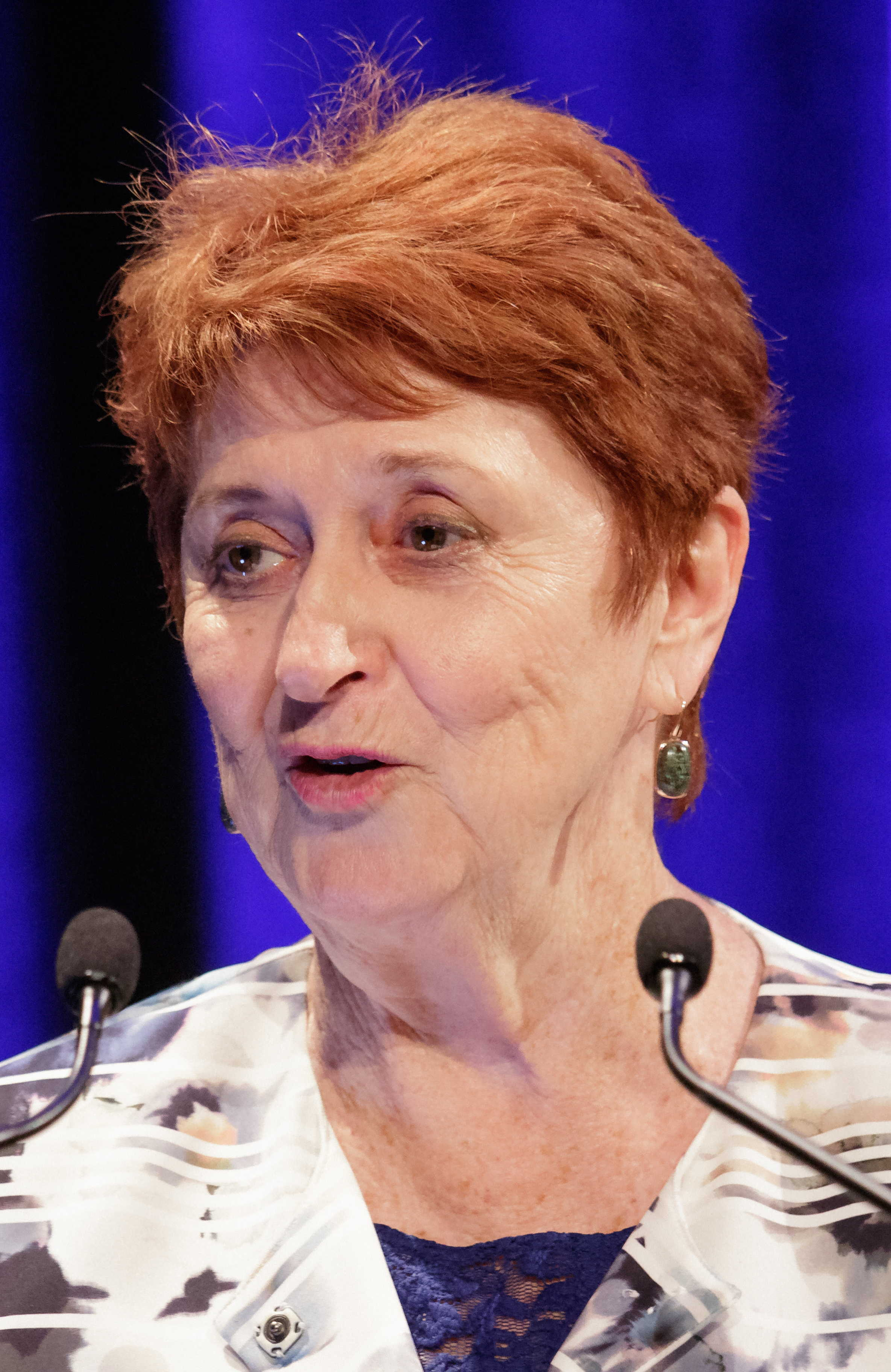
Susan Ryan

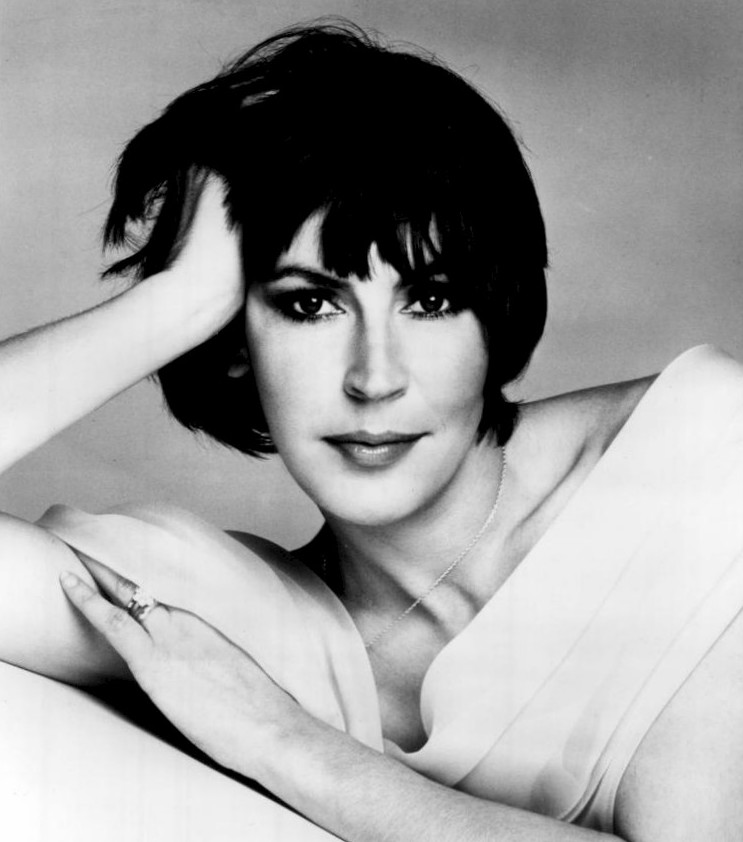
Helen Reddy

- 2 September – David Evans, air force officer (b. 1925)
- 6 September
  - Gavin Keneally, South Australian politician (b. 1933)
  - Col Markham, New South Wales politician (b. 1940)
- 7 September – Tim Mulherin, Queensland politician (b. 1957)
- 9 September – Sonny Chua, composer (born in Malaysia) (b. 1967)
- 12 September
  - John Fahey, 38th Premier of New South Wales (born in New Zealand) (b. 1945)
  - Hugh Routley, Australian rules footballer (Geelong) (b. 1940)
- 13 September – Joe Lawson, Australian rules footballer (b. 1934)
- 14 September
  - Jeff Dunne, Australian rules footballer (St Kilda) (b. 1956)
  - Peter Starkie, musician (b. 1948)
- 21 September – Ron Cobb, cartoonist and film designer (b. 1937)
- 22 September – Bob Ingham, businessman (b. 1931)
- 24 September – Dean Jones, cricketer, coach and commentator (died in India) (b. 1961)
- 25 September – Christine Hunt, Olympic javelin thrower (b. 1950)
- 27 September
  - Kevin Lewis, cricketer (b. 1947)
  - Susan Ryan, Australian Capital Territory politician and age discrimination commissioner (b. 1942)
- 28 September – Laurie Fagan, rugby league footballer (b. 1940 or 1941)
- 29 September
  - Phillip Rebbeck, cricketer (b. 1948)
  - Helen Reddy, singer (died in the United States) (b. 1941)
  - Ania Walwicz, poet, playwright, prose writer and visual artist (born in Poland) (b. 1951)

=== October ===
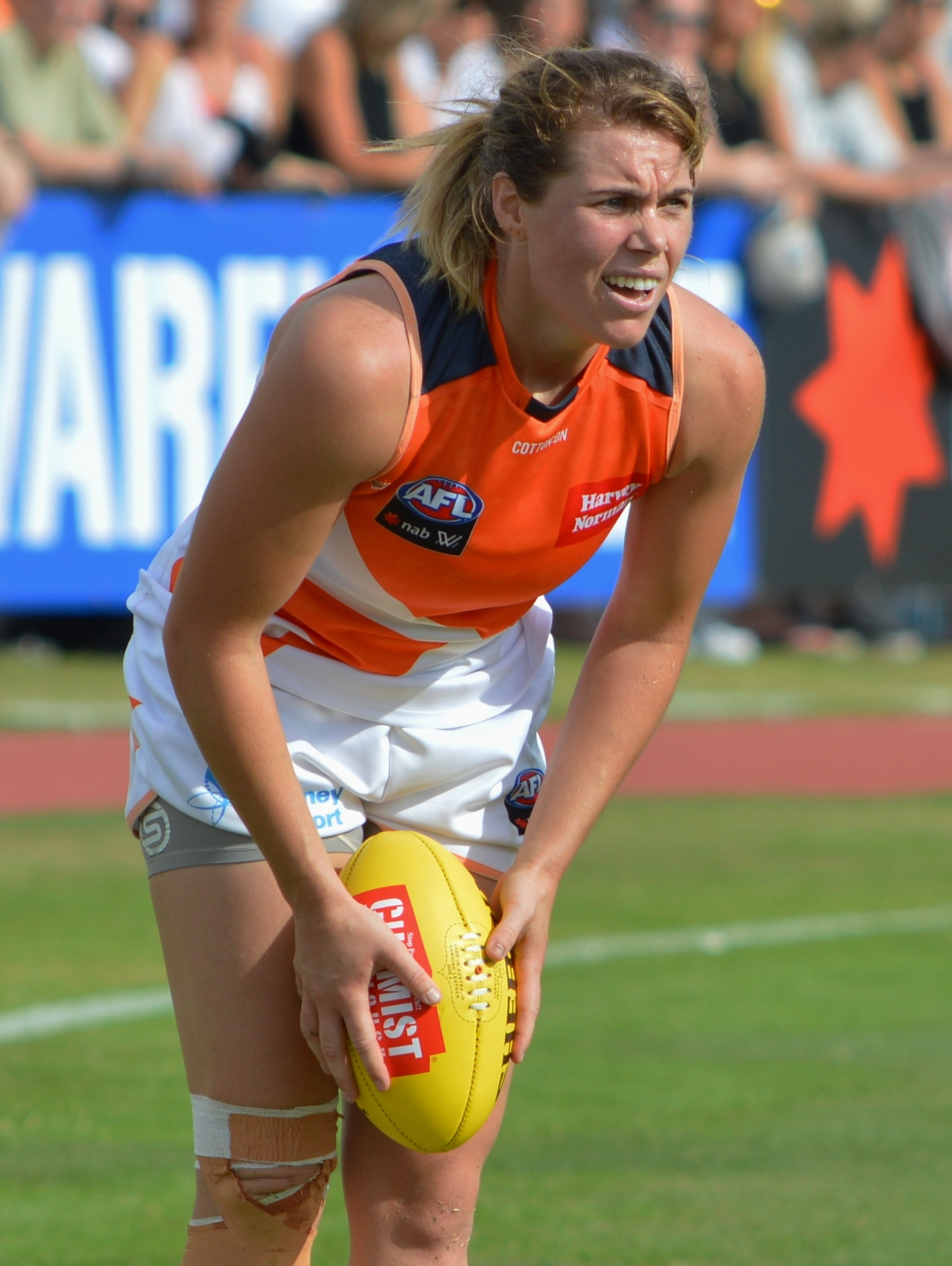
Jacinda Barclay

- 1 October – Tony Blue, Olympic middle-distance runner (b. 1936)
- 7 October – Geoffrey Dyer, artist (b. 1947)
- 8 October – David Ipp, lawyer, judge and NSW ICAC commissioner (born in South Africa) (b. 1938)
- 12 October
  - Jacinda Barclay, Australian rules footballer (Greater Western Sydney Giants) (b. 1991)
  - Leo Brereton, Australian rules footballer (Carlton) (b. 1936)
- 14 October
  - Ron Best, Victorian politician and Australian rules footballer (b. 1949)
  - Paul Matters, bassist (b. unknown)
  - Jack McLeod, Australian rules footballer (Hawthorn) (b. 1926)
- 20 October
  - David Cunningham, Olympic ice hockey player (b. 1928)
  - Paul Murphy, political journalist (b. 1942 or 1943)
- 27 October – Bruce Reid, sports doctor and Australian rules footballer (Hawthorn) (b. 1946)
- 28 October – Ray Blacklock, rugby league footballer (b. 1955)

=== November ===
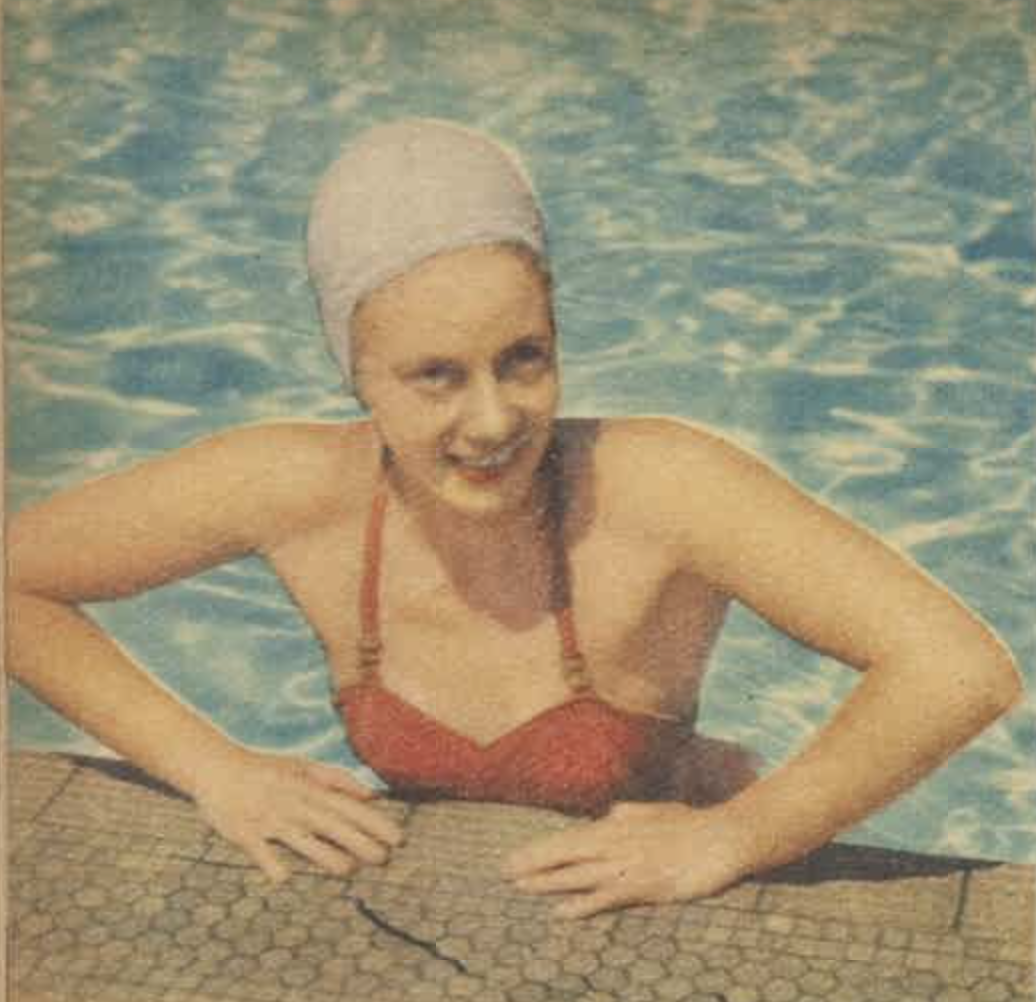
Barbara McAulay

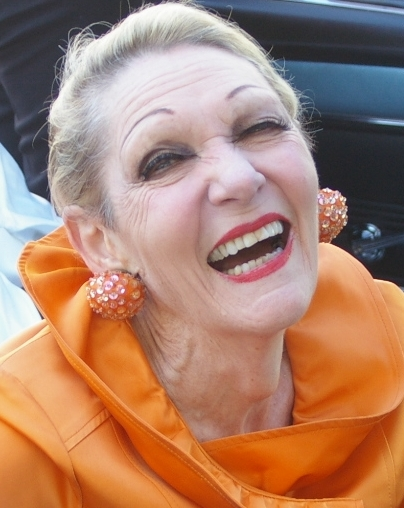
Jeannie Little

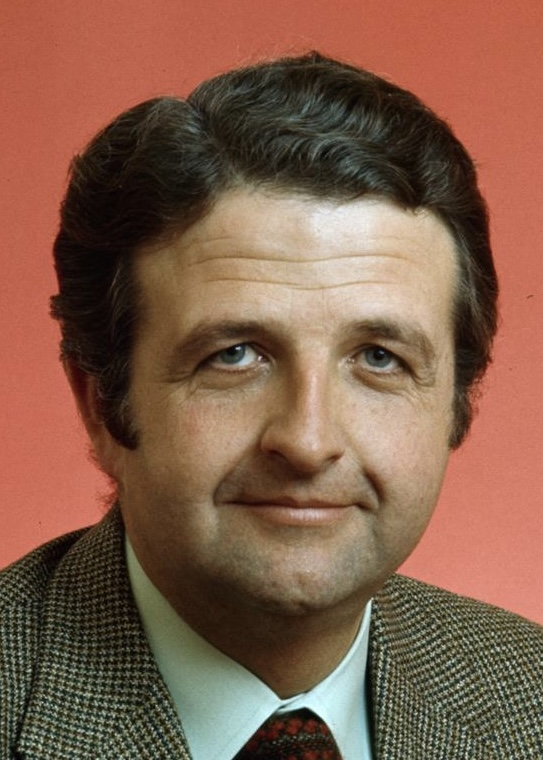
Chris Hurford

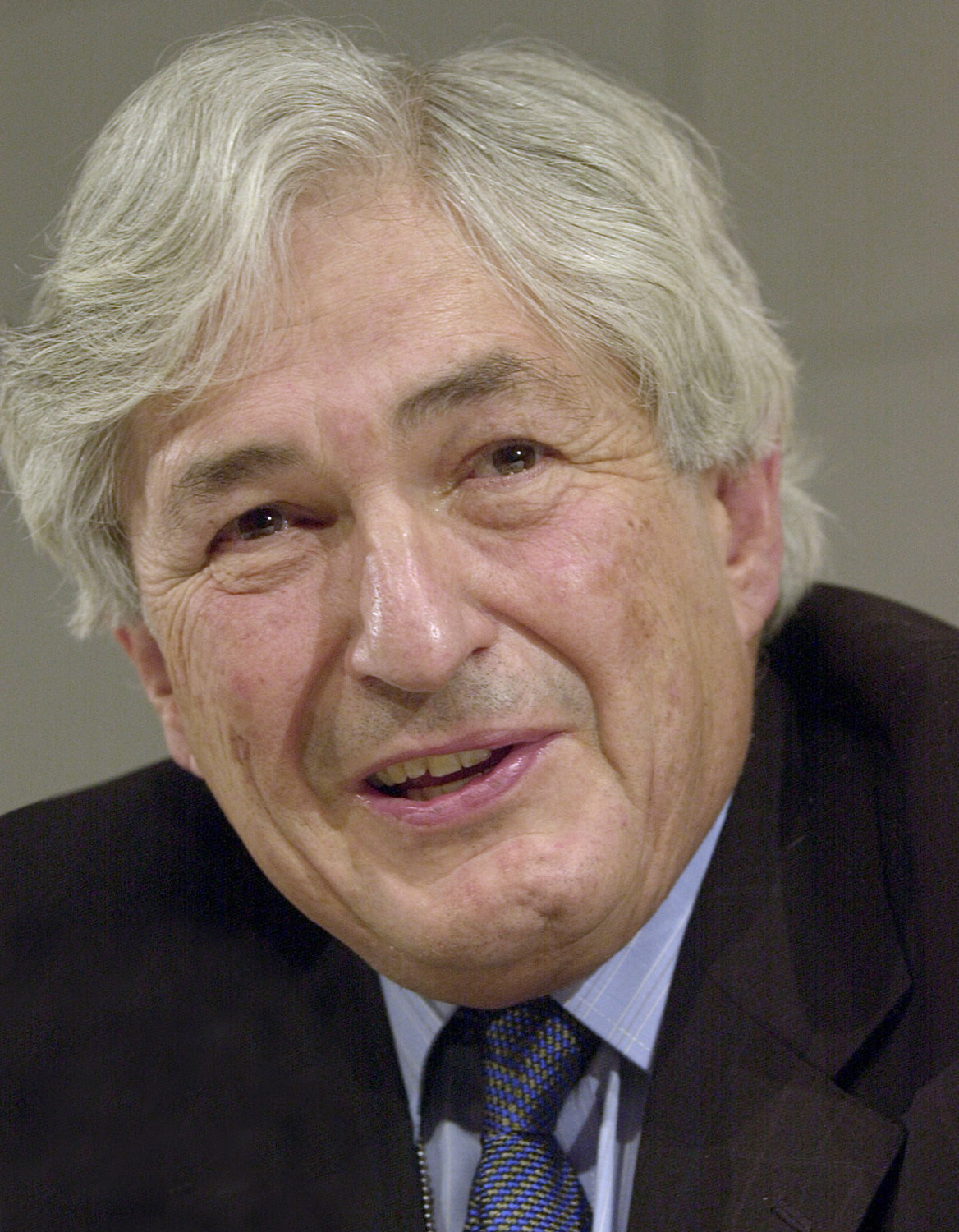
James Wolfensohn

- 1 November
  - Phil K, music DJ (b. 1969)
  - Des Moore, economist and political commentator (b. 1931)
  - Ronnie Peel, musician (b. 1946)
- 3 November
  - Blair Campbell, cricketer and Australian rules footballer (Richmond, Melbourne) (b. 1946)
  - Don Talbot, Olympic swimming coach and sports administrator (b. 1933)
- 5 November
  - Barbara McAulay, Olympic diver (b. 1929)
  - Joy Westmore, actress (b. 1932)
- 6 November
  - Mick Barry, rugby union footballer (b. 1943)
  - Gerald Stone, journalist (born in the United States) (b. 1933)
- 7 November – Jeannie Little, entertainer (b. 1938)
- 8 November – Clive Griffiths, Western Australian politician (b. 1928)
- 9 November – John Kinsela, Olympic wrestler (b. 1950)
- 11 November – Dame Margaret Guilfoyle, Victorian politician (born in the United Kingdom) (b. 1926)
- 14 November – Greg Growden, sports journalist and author (b. 1959 or 1960)
- 15 November
  - Chris Hurford, South Australian politician (born in India) (b. 1931)
  - Norman Taylor, basketball player (born in the United States) (b. 1965)
- 16 November – Bill Morgan, journalist and television producer (died in Canada) (b. 1940)
- 24 November
  - Yaroslav Horak, illustrator and comic book artist (born in China) (b. 1927)
  - Alan Ramsey, political journalist and speechwriter (b. 1938)
  - Mike Reed, Northern Territory politician (b. 1945)
- 25 November
  - Alan Powell, historian (born in New Zealand) (b. 1936)
  - James Wolfensohn, investment banker, economist, lawyer and Olympic fencer (died in the United States) (b. 1933)
- 30 November – Betty Bobbitt, actress (born in the United States) (b. 1939)

=== December ===
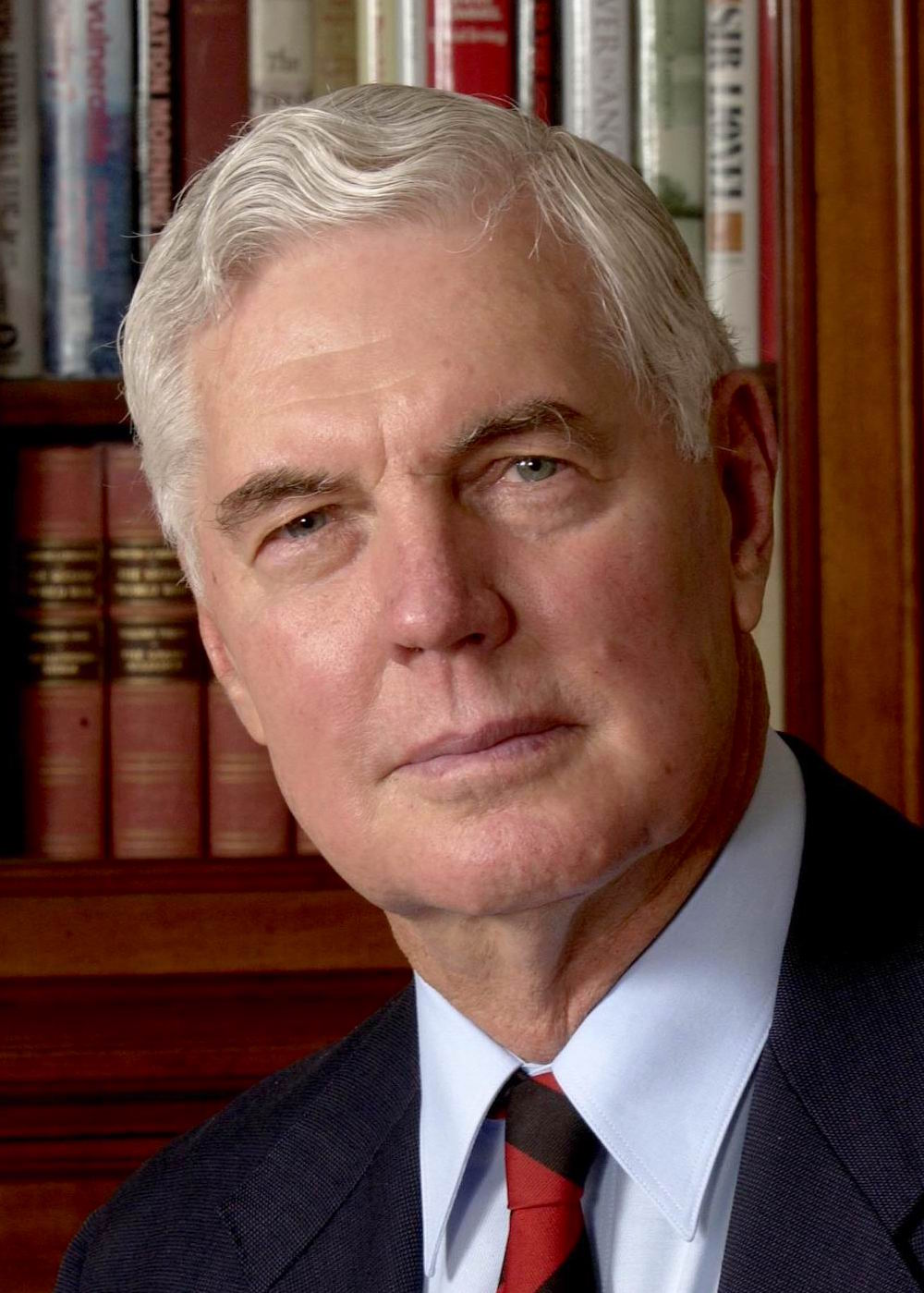
Michael Jeffery

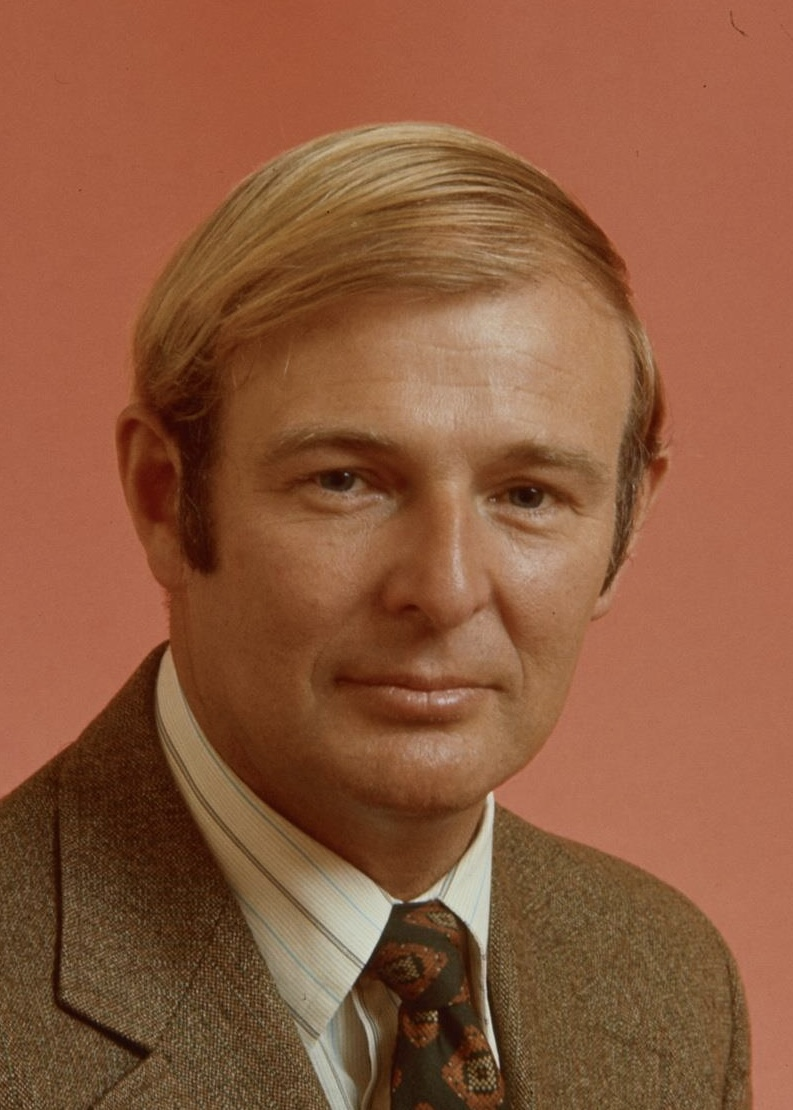
Doug Anthony

- 1 December
  - Hugh Keays-Byrne, actor (born in India) (b. 1947)
  - Dan Morrison, drummer (Area-7) (b. unknown)
- 4 December – Cliff Green, screenwriter (b. 1934)
- 5 December – John Harvey, racing driver (b. 1938)
- 6 December – Neil Robbins, athlete (b. 1929)
- 9 December – Mungo MacCallum, political journalist and commentator (b. 1941)
- 14 December – Eric Freeman, cricketer (b. 1944)
- 16 December – Ian Armstrong, 12th Deputy Premier of New South Wales (b. 1937)
- 17 December – Rod Crewther, physicist (b. 1945)
- 18 December – Michael Jeffery, 24th Governor-General (b. 1937)
- 20 December – Doug Anthony, 2nd Deputy Prime Minister of Australia (b. 1929)
- 21 December
  - Hamish McLachlan, Olympic rower (b. 1967)
  - Julian Moti, lawyer (born in the Philippines and died in Fiji) (b. 1965)
- 23 December – Brian Morrison, Australian rules footballer (Richmond) (b. 1938)
- 29 December – Geoffrey Robinson, bishop (b. 1937)
- 30 December – Seaman Dan, musician (b. 1929)

== See also ==
=== Country overviews ===
- 2020s in Australia political history
- History of Australia
- History of modern Australia
- Outline of Australia
- Government of Australia
- Politics of Australia
- Years in Australia
- Timeline of Australia history
- 2020 in Australian television
- 2020 in Australian literature
- List of Australian films of 2020

=== Related timelines for current period ===
- 2019–20 Australian region cyclone season
- 2020
- 2020 in Oceania
- COVID-19 pandemic in Australia
- 2020 in politics and government
- 2020s
