= Geoff Kerr =

Geoff Kerr may refer to:

- Geoff Kerr (footballer, born 1925) (1925–2020), Australian rules footballer for St Kilda during 1945 and 1947
- Geoff Kerr (footballer, born 1944) (1944–2023), Australian rules footballer for St Kilda during 1964
