= Roy Watson =

Roy Watson may refer to:

- Roy Watson (actor) (1876–1937), American actor
- Roy Watson (cricketer) (1933–2020), Australian cricketer
