= Adrian Young (disambiguation) =

Adrian Young (born 1969) is an American drummer for the rock band No Doubt.

Adrian Young also refers to:

- Adrian Young (American football) (born 1946)
- Adrian Young (footballer) (1943–2020), Australian rules footballer

== See also ==
- Adrian Younge (born 1978), American composer and music producer
