= Gutterson =

Gutterson is a surname. Notable people with the surname include:

- Albert Gutterson (1887–1965), American long jumper
- Daryl Gutterson (1953–2020), Australian rules footballer
- Jim Gutterson (1939–2008), Australian rules footballer

== See also ==
- Guterson
