= Guterson =

Guterson is a surname. Notable people with the surname include:

- Amy Guterson (born 1967), American actress
- David Guterson (born 1956), American novelist

== See also ==
- Gutterson
