= Brian Richardson (cricketer) =

Australian cricketer (1932–2020)

Personal information
- Full name: Brian Douglas Richardson
- Born: 15 May 1932; Hobart, Tasmania, Australia
- Died: 28 April 2020 (aged 87); Lindisfarne, Tasmania, Australia
- Batting: Right-handed

Domestic team information
- Years: Team
- 1954-1970: Tasmania
- Source: Cricinfo, 11 March 2016

Brian Douglas Richardson (15 May 1932 – 28 April 2020) was an Australian cricketer.

He played five first-class matches for Tasmania between 1954 and 1970. He scored 112 for Tasmania in the match against the touring MCC in January 1966. He played club cricket in Hobart for 24 years, scoring 9,612 runs at an average of 35.21 and taking 306 wickets at 18.50. In the 1968-69 season he scored 1001 runs for Kingborough at an average of 66.73.

Richardson worked as a horticulturist in the Tasmanian Department of Agriculture. He spent ten years as Director of a World Bank aid project in Kashmir.

== See also ==
- List of Tasmanian representative cricketers
