= Bob Gleeson =

Australian rules footballer (1931–2020)

Personal information
- Full name: Robert William Gleeson
- Born: 17 July 1931
- Died: 3 July 2020 (aged 88)
- Original team: St Kilda Thirds
- Height: 177 cm (5 ft 10 in)
- Weight: 75 kg (165 lb)

Playing career^{1}
Years	Club	Games (Goals)
1951	Richmond	1 (1)
- ^{1} Playing statistics correct to the end of 1951.

Bob Gleeson (17 July 1931 – 3 July 2020) was an Australian rules footballer, who played with Richmond in the Victorian Football League (VFL).
