= Douglas Rolfe =

Australian cricketer (1953–2020)

Doug Rolfe
Personal information
- Full name: Douglas John Rolfe
- Born: 26 February 1953; Melbourne, Australia
- Died: 1 June 2020 (aged 67); Adelaide, Australia

Domestic team information
- Years: Team
- 1975-76: Victoria
- 1979-80 to 1980-81: South Australia
- Source: Cricinfo, 4 October 2020

Douglas John Rolfe (26 February 1953 – 1 June 2020) was an Australian cricketer. He played five first-class cricket matches for Victoria and South Australia between 1976 and 1981.

== See also ==
- List of Victoria first-class cricketers
