= Sonny Chua =

Australian musician and composer (1967–2020)

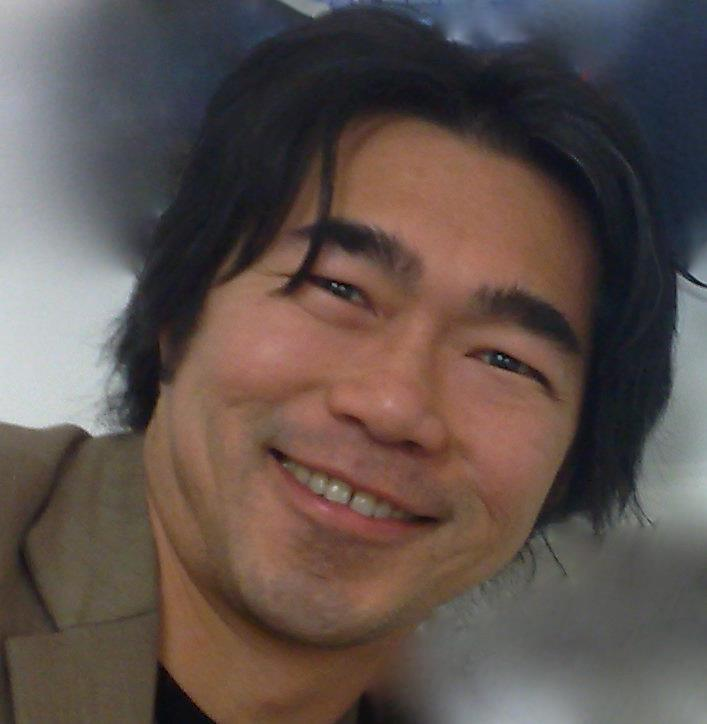
- Sonny Chua, Australian pianist and composer
- Born: 2 November 1967; Penang, Malaysia
- Died: 9 September 2020 (aged 52); Melbourne, Australia
- Occupations: Pianist, composer, music educator
- Website: www.sonnychua.com

Sonny Chua (2 November 1967 – 9 September 2020) was an Australian composer, pianist, and music educator. He taught at Melbourne High School and was Director of Music at the Mac.Robertson Girls' High School.

== Early life and education ==
Chua was born on 2 November 1967 in Penang, Malaysia. to Richard and Jenny Chua. The eldest of four children, he also lived in Kuala Lumpur, Singapore and Malacca, before the family emigrated to Melbourne, Australia.

Chua started piano lessons in Malacca at age eight, and continued his piano studies in Melbourne with Julie Zelman, who encouraged him to explore a range of modern music styles. It was at this point that his creative journey began. He attended the Victorian College of the Arts Secondary School (VCASS), studying piano under Stephen McIntyre. He completed a Bachelor of Music degree at the Conservatorium of Music of the University of Melbourne, specialising in piano performance, with Ronald Farren-Price, Alexander Semetsky and Max Cooke; and also studied composition with Peter Tahourdin, Barry Conyngham and Brenton Broadstock.

== Career ==
From 2002 to 2007 Chua taught at Melbourne High School. Chua's contributions at Melbourne High School are of broader notability in light of his development of the Massed Singing culture and his direction of the Chorale, which serves as a model for use of singing as a developmental and educational tool.

He left Melbourne High School to become the Director of Music at the Mac.Robertson Girls' High School, a sister school whose musical activities were closely coordinated with Melbourne High School, including the annual winter concert. He was later the Coordinator of Keyboard Studies at Carey Baptist Grammar School, in Melbourne.

== Works ==
Sonny Chua composed a myriad of piano compositions. His music is listed in all Australian examination syllabuses and in competitions around the world. As an educationalist, Chua was regularly invited to present masterclasses and talks on piano technique and musicianship and he has spoken in music conferences including the International Society of Music Education world conferences in Malaysia and Brazil, and at the Australasian Piano Pedagogy Conferences on piano teaching and composition.

Chua's music is characterised by its "playfulness with styles and musical techniques". His piece "Theme and 12 Deviations" exemplifies this playfulness, using the motif from Chopsticks (music) to highlight musical features of major eras of music.

Alongside his contributions to classical piano, Chua composed works at a variety of difficulty levels for use in the Australian Music Examinations Board examinations system. His music has proved popular among the variety of qualifying pieces, and was featured in the winning performance for the 2016 Foster's Music Award - awarded to the top music examinee in North-West Tasmania.

=== Solo Piano Music ===
No.	Title, key	Composition	Publication	Dedication, remarks	GA	NA
v1.01		2-finger piece — solo piano				
v1.02		Cockroach stomp — solo piano				
v1.03		Cuckoo fairy — solo piano				
v1.04		It wasn't me — solo piano				
v1.05		Jive turkey — solo piano				
v1.06		Lonely fairy — solo piano				
v1.07		Out of my way — solo piano				
v1.08		T-rex awake (1993) — solo piano				
v1.09		Two finger piece — solo piano				
v1.10		Waltz it all about II — solo piano				
v1.11		Waltz it all about I — solo piano				
v2.01		Dizzy fairy — solo piano				
v2.02		Dog awake — solo piano				
v2.03		Dog hungry — solo piano				
v2.04		Dripping fairy — solo piano				
v2.05		Funky fairy — solo piano				
v2.06		T-rex asleep (1993) — solo piano				
v2.07		Twinkling fairy — solo piano				
v2.08		Waltz it all about V — solo piano				
v2.09		Zeitgeist 4 — solo piano				
v3.01		Bedtime stomp — solo piano				
v3.02		Flapping fairy — solo piano				
v3.03		Hot and sassy — solo piano				
v3.04		Lonesome blues — solo piano				
v3.05		Waltz it all about VIII — solo piano				
v3.06		Waltz it all about VI — solo piano				
v3.07		Zeitgeist 22 — solo piano				
v3.08		Zeitgeist 7 — solo piano				
v3.09		Zeitgeist 8 — solo piano				
v4.01		Jig is up — solo piano				
v4.02		Rapunzel, Rapunzel, let down your hair — solo piano				
v4.03		Siesta (1997) — solo piano				
v4.04		Sonatina (1998) — solo piano This edition: 1998				
v4.05		Struttin' it around (2003) — solo piano This edition: 2003				
v.4.06		Transylvanian romp (1997) — solo piano				
v.4.07		Twirling fairy — solo piano				

== Death ==
Chua died on 9 September 2020 following a stroke.
