= Leo Brereton =

Australian rules footballer (1936–2020)

Personal information
- Full name: Leo Bernard Brereton
- Born: 1 November 1936
- Died: 12 October 2020 (aged 83)
- Original team: Cohuna
- Debut: Round 1, 1957, Carlton vs. Hawthorn, at Princes Park
- Height: 174 cm (5 ft 9 in)
- Weight: 70 kg (154 lb)

Playing career^{1}
Years	Club	Games (Goals)
1957–1962	Carlton	72 (129)
- ^{1} Playing statistics correct to the end of 1962.

Career highlights
- Carlton leading goalkicker (1960)

Leo Bernard Brereton (1 November 1936 – 12 October 2020) was an Australian rules footballer in the Victorian Football League.

== Career ==
Brereton made his debut for the Carlton Football Club in the Round 1 of the 1957 season. He left the club at the end of the 1962 season. In 1964 he was recruited to the Manuka Football Club, part of the Canberra Australian National Football League, and played there for two years.
