= Trevor Stewart (cricketer) =

Australian cricketer (1940–2020)

Personal information
- Born: 15 March 1940
- Died: 20 May 2020 (aged 80)
- Source: Cricinfo, 8 June 2020

Trevor Stewart (15 March 1940 – 20 May 2020) was an Australian cricketer. He played in six first-class matches for Queensland between 1960 and 1964.
