= Bruce Gonsalves =

Australian rules footballer (1956–2020)

Personal information
- Full name: Bruce Gonsalves
- Born: 26 December 1956
- Died: 6 April 2020 (aged 63)
- Original team: Greensborough
- Height: 198 cm (6 ft 6 in)
- Weight: 100 kg (220 lb)
- Position: Full Forward

Playing career^{1}
Years	Club	Games (Goals)
1975–76	Collingwood	5 (8)
- ^{1} Playing statistics correct to the end of 1976.

Bruce Gonsalves (26 December 1956 – 6 April 2020) was an Australian rules footballer who played with Collingwood in the Victorian Football League (VFL).
