= Goldie Alexander =

Australian writer and author (1936–2020)

Goldie Alexander (6 September 1936 – 3 August 2020) was an Australian author.

== Biography ==
Goldie Alexander was born in Melbourne, 6 September 1936. Her parents were Polish migrants.

== Style ==
A review of Hedgeburners described Alexander as "an experienced writer for primary-age children" and praised the "compelling plot, convincing characterization" and natural language used in the work.

A reviewer for the non-fiction book Talking about Your Weight noted that the work offered "good information and interesting insights" about the topic and they felt that it would not make readers self-conscious. They noted that the focus was on "balance and solutions" and that information on eating disorders was not sensationalized.

== Bibliography ==
- Astronet
- Beyond the Thicket
- Body and Soul: Lilbet's Romance
- Bridging the Snowy
- The Business of Writing for Young People (co-written with Hazel Edwards)
- Captain Gallant
- Car Crimes: the 2nd A~Z PI Mystery
- Cowpat$
- Dessi's Romance
- Dramatics: A Resource Book (co-written with Hazel Edwards)
- Gallipoli Medals
- The Grevillea Murder Mystery Trilogy
- A Hairy Story
- Health and Understanding 12 book Maga series (co-written with Hazel Edwards)
- Hedgeburners: An A~Z PI Mystery
- The History of Bread
- An Interview with Cindy Centipede
- Killer Virus and Other Stories
- Lame Duck Protest
- The Little Big School
- Mavis Road Medley
- Mentoring Your Memoir
- My Australian Story: Surviving Sydney Cove
- My Horrible Cousins and Other Stories
- Neptunia
- Right and Wrong: Class-Room Plays (co-written with Hazel Edwards)
- Seawall
- Shape Shifters
- 6788
- Space Footy and Other Stories
- Starship Q
- Trapeze
- The Youngest Cameleer
- eSide: An adventure in Cyberspace
- That Stranger Next Door
- Cybertricks
- My Holocaust Story: Hanna
- Penelope's Ghost
- Emily's Ghost
- Shakespeare Now Trilogy
- The Trytth Chronicles
- Gap Year Nanny
- Changing History?

== Awards ==
- Scholarship for the Romanian Writers Exchange Program September 2005
- Australian Society of Authors Mentor program 2005–2006, 2010 -2011, 2012–2013
- 2000 & 2001 Mary Grant Bruce Award for two long short stories Mavis Road Medley. CBC Notable Book. Short Listed by the Office of Multicultural Affairs. 'Youth Literature 150 best Book
- Easternport Bay – Victorian Ministry of Arts Writing grant
- My Australian Story: Surviving Sydney Cove – CBC Notable Book
- Cassie's Big Swim – Brant Point Literary prize
- Body and Soul – Brant Point Literary prize
- Mavis Road Medley chosen by the State Library of Victoria and the Australian Centre for Youth Literature as one of 150 'treasures' to celebrate their 150th anniversary.
- The Fellowship of Australian Writers Victoria Inc. National Literary Awards – FAW Mary Grant Bruce Award Short Story Award for Children's Literature with Roger Marchant – 2000.
- The Fellowship of Australian Writers Victoria Inc. National Literary Awards – FAW Mary Grant Bruce Award Short Story Award for Children's Literature with Kerry Coombe – 1999.
- "Cybertricks", a 2016 Notable CBCA
