= Phillip Rebbeck =

Australian cricketer (1948–2020)

Personal information
- Born: 31 July 1948; Adelaide, Australia
- Died: 29 September 2020 (aged 72)
- Source: Cricinfo, 21 September 2020

Phillip Rebbeck (31 July 1948 – 29 September 2020) was an Australian cricketer. He played in five first-class and two List A matches for South Australia in 1971/72.

== See also ==
- List of South Australian representative cricketers
