= Alan Clough =

Australian rules footballer, coach, and umpire (1932–2020)

Personal information
- Full name: Alan Charles Clough
- Born: 9 November 1932
- Died: 20 April 2020 (aged 87)
- Original team: Seddon
- Height: 189 cm (6 ft 2 in)
- Weight: 81 kg (179 lb)

Playing career^{1}
Years	Club	Games (Goals)
1955–1957	Footscray	17 (4)
- ^{1} Playing statistics correct to the end of 1957.

Alan Charles Clough OAM (9 November 1932 – 20 April 2020) was an Australian rules footballer who played for the Footscray Football Club in the Victorian Football League (VFL).

He played, coached and umpired in the Western Region Football League for Seddon Football Club, being inducted as a legend in both the football club and umpiring halls of fame.
