= Nigel Murch =

Australian cricketer (1944–2020)

- Born: Stewart Nigel Clifford Murch; 27 June 1944; Warrnambool, Victoria, Australia
- Died: 15 July 2020 (aged 76)
- Occupation: cricketer
- Years active: 1966–1970
- Known for: appeared in 10 first-class matches
- Relatives: Cathy Freeman (daughter-in-law)

Stewart Nigel Clifford Murch (27 June 1944 – 15 July 2020) was an Australian cricketer active from 1966 to 1970 who played for Northamptonshire and Victoria.

Born in Warrnambool, Victoria, Murch appeared in ten first-class matches as a right arm fast bowler and right-handed batsman. He took 17 wickets with a best performance of three for 49, and scored 215 runs with a highest score of 64.

He died on 15 July 2020 at the age of 76. He was the father-in-law of Cathy Freeman, Australia's 400m Olympic gold medallist.

== See also ==
- List of Victoria first-class cricketers
