= John Bradbury (Australian footballer) =

Australian rules footballer (1941–2020)

Personal information
- Full name: John Bradbury
- Born: 31 March 1941
- Died: 23 July 2020 (aged 79)
- Original team: Sunshine
- Height: 180 cm (5 ft 11 in)
- Weight: 84 kg (185 lb)

Playing career^{1}
| Years | Club | Games (Goals) |
| 1958, 1960–61, 1963 | Footscray | 25 (2) |
- ^{1} Playing statistics correct to the end of 1963.

John Bradbury (31 March 1941 – 23 July 2020) was an Australian rules footballer who played with Footscray in the Victorian Football League (VFL).
