= Brian Barclay =

Australian rules footballer (1938–2020)

Personal information
- Full name: Brian William Barclay
- Born: 27 February 1938
- Died: 26 April 2020 (aged 82)
- Original team: Williamstown Rovers
- Height: 188 cm (6 ft 2 in)
- Weight: 83 kg (183 lb)
- Position: Defence

Playing career^{1}
Years	Club	Games (Goals)
1957–62	Fitzroy	61 (9)
- ^{1} Playing statistics correct to the end of 1962.

Brian William Barclay (27 February 1938 – 26 April 2020) was an Australian rules footballer who played with Fitzroy in the Victorian Football League (VFL).
