= John Smith (cricketer, born 1936) =

Australian cricketer (1936–2020)

Personal information
- Full name: John Phillips Smith
- Born: 6 March 1936; Ballarat, Australia
- Died: 10 February 2020 (aged 83)

Domestic team information
- Years: Team
- 1964: Victoria
- Source: Cricinfo, 4 December 2015

John Phillips Smith (6 March 1936 – 10 February 2020) was an Australian cricketer. He played one first-class cricket match for Victoria in 1964, against a touring South African side.

== See also ==
- List of Victoria first-class cricketers
