= Norm Neeson =

Australian rules footballer (1934–2020)

Personal information
- Full name: Norman Clement Neeson
- Born: 19 February 1934
- Died: 16 July 2020 (aged 86)
- Height: 187 cm (6 ft 2 in)
- Weight: 78 kg (172 lb)

Playing career^{1}
Years	Club	Games (Goals)
1955–56	North Melbourne	5 (0)
1958–59	Coburg (VFA)	19 (28)
- ^{1} Playing statistics correct to the end of 1959.

Norman Clement Neeson (19 February 1934 – 16 July 2020) was an Australian rules footballer who played with North Melbourne in the Victorian Football League (VFL).

Neeson was later captain coach of Ainslie Football Club in the Australian Capital Territory from 1961 to 1965.
