= Kevin Lewis (cricketer) =

Australian cricketer (1947–2020)

Personal information
- Born: 27 November 1947; Adelaide, Australia
- Died: 27 September 2020 (aged 72)
- Source: Cricinfo, 12 August 2020

Kevin Lewis (27 November 1947 – 27 September 2020) was an Australian cricketer. He played in three first-class matches for South Australia in 1981/82.

== See also ==
- List of South Australian representative cricketers
