= Blair Campbell =

Australian rules footballer and cricketer (1946–2020)

Personal information
- Full name: Blair Maesmore Campbell
- Born: 20 August 1946; Melbourne, Victoria, Australia
- Died: 3 November 2020 (aged 74)
- Batting: Right-handed
- Bowling: Slow left-arm wrist-spin

Domestic team information
- Years: Team
- 1969/70: Victoria
- 1977/78–1979/80: Tasmania

Career statistics
Competition	First-class	List A
Matches	19	2
Runs scored	312	22
Batting average	13.56	11.00
100s/50s	0/1	0/0
Top score	52*	13
Balls bowled	2,396	40
Wickets	32	0
Bowling average	36.56	–
5 wickets in innings	1	–
10 wickets in match	0	–
Best bowling	5/53	–
Catches/stumpings	7/–	0/–
- Source: CricketArchive, 4 November 2020
Australian rules football career
Playing career
Years	Club	Games (Goals)
1966-68	Richmond	8 (12)
1969	Melbourne	12 (23)

Blair Maesmore Campbell (20 August 1946 – 3 November 2020) was an Australian rules footballer and cricketer.

Campbell played first-class cricket for Victoria and Tasmania as a slow left-arm wrist-spin bowler and right-handed batsman. He also played in Victorian Football League for both Richmond and Melbourne Football Clubs during the 1960s.

Campbell is considered one of the earliest exponents of the banana kick.
