= Ben Acton =

Australian ice hockey player (1927–2020)

Personal information
- Full name: Benjamin Maxwell Acton
- Nationality: Australian
- Born: 2 December 1927 Footscray, Australia
- Died: 10 July 2020 (aged 92) Queensland, Australia

Sport
- Sport: Ice hockey

Benjamin Maxwell Acton II (2 December 1927 – 10 July 2020) was an Australian ice hockey player. He competed in the 1960 Winter Olympics.

Acton was born at Footscray Hospital and named after his grandfather. He attended Geelong Road State School and Footscray Technical College, later becoming a plumber like his father and grandfather. As a young man, he trained with the Footscray Football Club in the Victorian Football League.

Acton turned his focus to skating and hockey. He found great success in field hockey, winning the Footscray Hockey Club’s Best and Fairest award ten years in a row from 1947 to 1956. Wanting to give others the opportunity for recognition, he withdrew from award consideration after 1956 but remained an active player.

Acton also coached the Footscray Hockey Club from 1949 to 1958, leading the team to two State League Premiership victories. He represented Victoria in field hockey for 15 years, showcasing his consistent skill and leadership at both club and state levels.

A rare dual-sport athlete, Ben is believed to be the only Australian—and possibly the only man worldwide—to represent his country in both field hockey and ice hockey. He served as vice-captain of the Australian men’s field hockey team in 1950, 1952, and 1954, and had the honour of carrying the torch during the 1956 Melbourne Olympics.

In 1960, Acton captained the Australia men's national ice hockey team at the Winter Olympics in Squaw Valley, California. Although invited to compete again at the 1964 Games, he declined due to business commitments.
