= Geoff Kerr (footballer, born 1944) =

Australian rules footballer

Geoff WilsonKerr

Personal information
- Full name: Geoff Kerr
- Born: 17 April 1944
- Died: 12 January 2023 (aged 78)
- Original team: Caulfield Amateurs
- Height: 191 cm (6 ft 3 in)
- Weight: 83 kg (183 lb)

Playing career^{1}
Years	Club	Games (Goals)
1964	St Kilda	2 (0)
- ^{1} Playing statistics correct to the end of 1964.

Geoff Wilson Kerr (17 April 1944 – 12 January 2023) was an Australian rules footballer who played with St Kilda in the Victorian Football League (VFL).
