= Jack McLeod (footballer, born 1926) =

Australian rules footballer (1926–2020)

Personal information
- Full name: Jack Maxwell McLeod
- Born: 10 February 1926; Richmond, Victoria
- Died: 14 October 2020 (aged 94)
- Original team: Auburn
- Height: 178 cm (5 ft 10 in)
- Weight: 80 kg (176 lb)
- Position: Defender

Playing career^{1}
Years	Club	Games (Goals)
1945–47, 1950–51	Hawthorn	64 (14)
- ^{1} Playing statistics correct to the end of 1951.

Jack Maxwell McLeod (10 February 1926 – 14 October 2020) was an Australian rules footballer who played with Hawthorn in the Victorian Football League (VFL).

== Career ==
In 1945 he played 2 games every weekend, Saturday playing for Hawthorn and Sunday playing for the RAAF. That year the RAAF made the Armed Services Grand Final. Being the exceptional player he was, the following season 1946, only his second season playing, he earned a spot on the Victorian team playing South Australia in the game at Princes Park. With Victoria leading at half time by 39 points, however SA fought back and the game resulted in a draw.

Late 1947, Jack suffered a serious injury to his knee while playing Melbourne in his 50th game, therefore missing the 1948 and 1949 seasons. Returning in 1950, he played another 14 games over the 1950–51 seasons, bringing his career total games to 64.

In 1954 he joined Hawthorn's team selection committee and was appointed Chairman of Selectors in 1955. He remained in that position until 1965, including during the club's first finals appearance in 1957 and their first premiership in 1961. He returned to the position in 1968 until 1970. He continued to be involved in recruiting for Hawthorn, including identifying Jason Dunstall as a talented junior whilst living in Queensland.

He died from dementia in October 2020 at the age of 94.

== Honours and achievements ==
Individual

- Hawthorn life member
