= Roy Watson (cricketer) =

Australian cricketer (1933–2020)

Personal information
- Full name: Roy Clarence William Watson
- Born: 21 June 1933; Fremantle, Western Australia
- Died: 10 April 2020 (aged 86); New Lambton Heights, Newcastle, New South Wales
- Batting: Right-handed
- Role: Wicket-keeper

Domestic team information
- Years: Team
- 1957/58–1958/59: Western Australia

Career statistics
Competition	First-class
Matches	7
Runs scored	115
Batting average	19.16
100s/50s	0/0
Top score	28*
Catches/stumpings	23/0
- Source: Cricinfo, 30 April 2020

Roy Clarence William Watson (21 June 1933 – 10 April 2020) was an Australian cricketer. He played seven first-class matches for Western Australia from 1957–58 to 1958–59. A wicket-keeper, in Western Australia's 89-run victory over South Australia in the 1957-58 Sheffield Shield he took seven catches and made 28 not out and 21 not out.
