= Adrian Young (footballer) =

Australian rules footballer (1943–2020)

Personal information
- Full name: Adrian John Young
- Born: 10 March 1943
- Died: 12 August 2020 (aged 77)
- Original team: Burnie
- Height: 180 cm (5 ft 11 in)
- Weight: 80 kg (176 lb)

Playing career^{1}
Years	Club	Games (Goals)
1964	St Kilda	1 (0)
- ^{1} Playing statistics correct to the end of 1964.

Adrian John Young (10 March 1943 – 12 August 2020) was an Australian rules footballer who played one game for the St Kilda Football Club in the Victorian Football League (VFL).
