= Geoff Kerr (footballer, born 1925) =

Australian rules footballer (1925–2020)

Personal information
- Full name: Geoff Kerr
- Born: 7 April 1925
- Died: 26 May 2020 (aged 95)
- Original team: Caulfield Amateurs
- Height: 188 cm (6 ft 2 in)
- Weight: 83 kg (183 lb)

Playing career^{1}
Years	Club	Games (Goals)
1945, 1947	St Kilda	7 (2)
- ^{1} Playing statistics correct to the end of 1947.

Geoff Kerr (7 April 1925 – 26 May 2020) was an Australian rules footballer who played with St Kilda in the Victorian Football League (VFL). He died in May 2020 at the age of 95.
