= Daryl Gutterson =

Australian rules footballer (1953–2020)

Personal information
- Full name: Darryl Graeme Gutterson
- Born: 8 May 1953
- Died: 13 August 2020 (aged 67)
- Original team: Lalor
- Height: 183 cm (6 ft 0 in)
- Weight: 71 kg (157 lb)

Playing career^{1}
Years	Club	Games (Goals)
1971	Carlton	1 (0)
- ^{1} Playing statistics correct to the end of 1971.

Darryl Graeme Gutterson (8 May 1953 – 13 August 2020) was an Australian rules footballer who played for Carlton in the VFL.

Gutterson played just one game for Carlton in the 1971 season. It was against Fitzroy at Princes Park, with Carlton winning by 15 points.
