= Deaths in July 2020 =

The following is a list of notable deaths in July 2020.

Entries for each day are listed alphabetically by surname. A typical entry lists information in the following sequence:

- Name, age, country of citizenship at birth, subsequent country of citizenship (if applicable), reason for notability, cause of death (if known), and reference.

== July 2020 ==
=== 1 ===
- Kwadwo Owusu Afriyie, 62–63, Ghanaian politician, CEO of the Forestry Commission (since 2017), COVID-19.
- Bill Black, 76, New Zealand pilot and deer hunter.
- Pierre Breteche, 91, French Olympic sailor (1968).
- Edward A. Burkhalter, 91, American navy officer, heart attack.
- Jean Cabannes, 95, French magistrate and jurist, member of the Constitutional Council (1989–1998).
- Cao Zhi, 92, Chinese politician, Vice Chairman of the National People's Congress (1998–2003).
- Gyan Kumari Chhantyal, 63, Nepali politician, member of the Constituent Assembly (since 2013), heart disease.
- Nancie Colling, 101, English lawn bowls player.
- Max Crook, 83, American keyboardist and songwriter ("Runaway").
- Gay Culverhouse, 73, American academic administrator and sports executive, President of the Tampa Bay Buccaneers (1991–1994) and Notre Dame College (1995–1996), myelofibrosis.
- Hugh Downs, 99, American broadcaster and television host (20/20, Today, Concentration), heart failure.
- Luizinho Drummond, 80, Brazilian illegal lottery operator, stroke.
- Bill Duplissea, 70, American politician, member of the California State Assembly (1986–1988), cancer.
- Heinrich Fink, 85, German theologian and politician.
- Michael P. Fleming, 57, American attorney.
- David F. Gantt, 78, American politician, member of the New York State Assembly (since 1983).
- Beate Grimsrud, 57, Norwegian novelist and playwright, breast cancer.
- Ida Haendel, 91, Polish-born British violinist, kidney cancer.
- George Hallett, 78, South African photographer.
- Matthias Kaul, 71, German percussionist and composer.
- Ian MacDougall, 82, Australian naval officer, Chief of the Naval Staff (1991–1994).
- Brent MacNab, 89, Canadian ice hockey player.
- Lorenz Magaard, 86, German-American mathematician and oceanographer.
- Santiago Manuin Valera, 63, Peruvian Awajún leader and Indigenous rights activist, COVID-19.
- Ray Matheny, 91, American anthropologist.
- Philip McShane, 88, Irish mathematician and philosopher.
- Eurídice Moreira, 81, Brazilian politician, Paraíba MLA (1995–1998), complications from COVID-19.
- Jean-Pierre Moumon, 72–73, French writer.
- Joe Pennington, 92, American musician.
- Latifur Rahman, 75, Bangladeshi comprador (Transcom Group).
- Emmanuel Rakotovahiny, 81, Malagasy politician, Prime Minister (1995–1996), heart disease.
- Georg Ratzinger, 96, German Roman Catholic priest and musician, conductor of the Regensburger Domspatzen (1964–1994).
- Tommy Ring, 81, Irish hurler.
- Rokamlova, 79, Indian politician, Speaker of the Mizoram Legislative Assembly (1990–1993), kidney disease.
- Pedro Luis Ronchino, 92, Argentine Roman Catholic prelate, Bishop of Comodoro Rivadavia (1993–2005).
- Paul Seban, 90, Algerian-born French film director (La Musica, French Cancan).
- Jan Steward, 91, American photographer, complications from pneumonia.
- Jim Thorpe, 76, American football player (Winnipeg Blue Bombers, Toronto Argonauts).
- Aleksejs Vidavskis, 76, Latvian politician, mayor of Daugavpils (1994–2001).
- Sir Everton Weekes, 95, Barbadian cricketer (West Indies, national team).
- Sybil Wettasinghe, 92, Sri Lankan children's author.

=== 2 ===
- Ira Albright, 61, American football player (Montreal Alouettes, Buffalo Bills).
- Betsy Ancker-Johnson, 93, American plasma physicist.
- Herman Benson, 104, American union reformer and machinist.
- Olga Blinova, 89, Russian linguist.
- Paolo Cabras, 89, Italian politician, Deputy (1972–1987), Senator (1987–1994).
- Raymond Carter, 84, British politician, MP (1970–1979).
- Chiu Chuang-huan, 94, Taiwanese politician, President of the Examination Yuan (1993–1996), Vice Premier (1981–1984) and Minister of Interior (1978–1981), complications from pneumonia.
- Fan Yunruo, 24, Chinese professional Go player, suicide by jumping.
- Christian Garrison, 78, American author and filmmaker, cancer.
- Afroditi Grigoriadou, 88, Greek actress (Electra, I Agapi Argise mia Mera).
- Jon Gilliam, 81, American football player (Dallas Texans, Kansas City Chiefs).
- Jack Harding, 87, Irish hurler.
- Ludwig Hinterstocker, 89, German footballer (VfB Stuttgart).
- Ole Holsti, 86, American political scientist.
- Ángela Jeria, 93, Chilean archaeologist and human rights activist.
- Nikolai Kapustin, 82, Russian composer and pianist.
- Jiro Kuwata, 85, Japanese manga artist (8 Man).
- Tunney Lee, 88, Chinese-born American architect, complications from cancer.
- Wanderley Mariz, 79, Brazilian politician, Deputy (1975–1987), complications from COVID-19.
- Bill Massey, 83, New Zealand Hall of Fame softball player (national team), World Championship bronze medallist (1966).
- Teodoro Enrique Pino Miranda, 73, Mexican Roman Catholic prelate, Bishop of Huajuapan de León (since 2000).
- Joseph Moroni, 82, French Olympic rower.
- John Ebong Ngole, 80, Cameroonian politician.
- Tilo Prückner, 79, German actor (The NeverEnding Story, Iron Sky, Tatort), heart failure.
- Kevin Rafferty, 73, American film director (The Atomic Cafe, Blood in the Face) and cinematographer (Roger & Me), cancer.
- Avon Riley, 62, American football player (Houston Oilers, Pittsburgh Steelers).
- Reckful, 31, Israeli-American Twitch streamer, suicide.
- Abraham Louis Schneiders, 94, Dutch diplomat and writer.
- Ronald L. Schwary, 76, American film and television producer (Ordinary People, Batteries Not Included, Medium), Oscar winner (1981).
- Billy Tang, 69, Hong Kong film director (Dr. Lamb, Those Were the Days..., Dial D for Demons), nasopharyngeal carcinoma.
- Marc Treanor, 57, British sand artist.
- Mike Walling, 69, English comic actor and screenwriter.
- Xu Qifeng, 84, Chinese engineer.
- Yoon Sam-yook, 83, South Korean film director (I Will Survive) and screenwriter (Yalkae, a Joker in High School, Suddenly at Midnight).
- Willem van Zwet, 86, Dutch mathematician.

=== 3 ===
- Ejike Obumneme Aghanya, 87, Nigerian military officer and electrical engineer.
- Manuel Machado Alvarez, 59, Cuban murderer, COVID-19.
- Protik Prakash Banerjee, 51, Indian jurist, Judge of the Calcutta High Court (since 2017), heart failure.
- Tyson Brummett, 35, American baseball player (Philadelphia Phillies), plane crash.
- Neil Erland Byers, 91, Canadian politician.
- Earl Cameron, 102, Bermudian-born British actor (Doctor Who, Pool of London, The Interpreter).
- Hermine de Clermont-Tonnerre, 54, French princess, writer and actress (La Ferme Célébrités), traffic collision.
- Len Cunning, 69, Canadian ice hockey player (Johnstown Jets).
- Scott Erskine, 57, American serial killer, COVID-19.
- Bob Gleeson, 88, Australian footballer (Richmond).
- Wahidul Haq, 87, Bangladeshi politician, Minister of Finance (1988, 1988–1990).
- Saroj Khan, 71, Indian choreographer (Mr. India, Nagina, Chandni), cardiac arrest.
- Lore Krainer, 89, Austrian composer.
- Ardico Magnini, 91, Italian footballer (Pistoiese, Fiorentina, national team).
- Willie McGrotty, 67, Scottish footballer (Blackpool).
- Claude Mercier-Ythier, 88–89, French harpsichord maker.
- Michel Meylan, 81, French politician, Member of the National Assembly (1988–2002).
- Aurelio Moyano, 81, Argentine footballer (FC Nancy, AS Cannes).
- Rolf Muuss, 95, German-born American psychologist, heart failure.
- Francis Nadeem, 64, Pakistani Roman Catholic priest, heart attack.
- Mamadou Bamba Ndiaye, 71, Senegalese politician, Minister of Religious Affairs (2000–2012).
- Elba Perez-Cinciarelli, 76, American politician, member of the New Jersey General Assembly (2002–2004).
- John Peter, 81, Hungarian-born British theatre critic.
- Faruk Quazi, 71, Bangladeshi journalist, kidney failure.
- Pamela Rush, 49, American anti-poverty activist, COVID-19.
- Charlie Slack, 89, American basketball player (Marshall Thundering Herd).
- Bill Stricker, 72, American basketball player (Portland Trail Blazers).
- Leonardo Villar, 96, Brazilian actor (O Pagador de Promessas, The Hour and Turn of Augusto Matraga, Juego peligroso), cardiac arrest.
- Emily Howell Warner, 80, American airline pilot.

=== 4 ===
- Barbara Ackermann, 95, American politician.
- T. M. Giasuddin Ahmed, 83, Bangladeshi politician, MP (1986–1990).
- Alan S. Becker, 74, American politician, attorney and educator, member of the Florida House of Representatives (1972–1978), cancer.
- Mary Cozens-Walker, 81, English textile artist and painter.
- Angelo Fagiani, 77, Italian Roman Catholic prelate, Archbishop of Camerino-San Severino Marche (1997–2007).
- Ronnie and Donnie Galyon, 68, American sideshow attractions and documentary subjects, world's oldest conjoined twins.
- Brandis Kemp, 76, American actress (Fridays, AfterMASH, Hexed), brain cancer and complications from COVID-19.
- Robert Mack, 61, Austrian Olympic ice hockey player (1988).
- Irwin Molasky, 93, American real estate developer.
- Janet Nathan, 81-82, British painter.
- Nathan Oman, 45, Thai singer, sepsis.
- John Papworth, 98, British Anglican clergyman and activist.
- Martha Rocha, 83, Brazilian model, Miss Universo Brasil (1954), heart attack.
- Seninho, 71, Portuguese footballer (Porto, New York Cosmos, national team).
- Bhakti Charu Swami, 74, Indian spiritual teacher (International Society for Krishna Consciousness), COVID-19.
- Earl Thomas, 71, American football player (Chicago Bears, St. Louis Cardinals, Houston Oilers).
- Mary Twala, 80, South African actress (Life, Above All, Beat the Drum, Sarafina!).
- Arie van der Vlis, 79, Dutch military officer, Chief of the Defence Staff (1992–1994).
- Kevin Wickham, 80, Australian Olympic rower (1964).

=== 5 ===
- Ragaa Al Geddawy, 85, Egyptian actress and model, COVID-19.
- Souzana Antonakaki, 85, Greek architect.
- Bill Barlow, 89, Canadian politician.
- Horace Barlow, 98, British neuroscientist.
- Fiorenza Bassoli, 71, Italian politician.
- Léo Bergoffen, 97, German-born French Holocaust survivor.
- Nirmalendu Bhattacharya, 61, Indian politician.
- Antônio Bivar, 81, Brazilian writer and playwright, complications from COVID-19.
- Tom Churchill, 59, American meteorologist and radio personality, melanoma.
- Mário Coelho, 84, Portuguese bullfighter, COVID-19.
- Nick Cordero, 41, Canadian actor and singer (Bullets Over Broadway, A Bronx Tale, Waitress), complications from COVID-19.
- Ayatullah Durrani, 64, Pakistani politician, MP (2008–2013), COVID-19.
- Cleveland Eaton, 80, American jazz bassist.
- Marc A. Franklin, 88, American lawyer.
- Prosser Gifford, 91, American historian and academic.
- Bettina Gilois, 58, German-born American screenwriter (Bessie, Glory Road, McFarland, USA), cancer.
- Terence Greer, 90, British illustrator.
- Richard C. Henry, 94, American lieutenant general.
- Willi Holdorf, 80, German athlete, Olympic champion (1964).
- Kōshū Itabashi, 93, Japanese Sōtō Zen master, abbot of Sōji-ji (1998–2002).
- Ahmad Karami, 76, Lebanese politician.
- Mauro Mellini, 93, Italian lawyer and politician, Deputy (1976–1992), secretary of the Radical Party (1968–1969).
- Aubert Pallascio, 82, Canadian actor (The Kidnapping of the President, Black List, Punisher: War Zone), cancer.
- Margaret Sayers Peden, 93, American translator.
- Barrie Penrose, 78, British investigative journalist and author, complications from Parkinson's disease.
- Brad Pye Jr., 89, American sports journalist (Los Angeles Sentinel), broadcaster, and politician.
- Bob Reade, 87, American college football player (Cornell College) and coach (Geneseo High School, Augustana College).
- Ena Thomas, 85, Welsh television cook.
- Tiloun, 53, Réunionese singer.
- Volodymyr Troshkin, 72, Ukrainian football player (Dynamo Kyiv), Olympic bronze medallist (1976) and manager (Veres Rivne).
- Olena Tsvek, 88, Ukrainian archaeologist.
- Tom Vaughn, 77, American football player (Detroit Lions, Iowa State Cyclones).
- Ashoka Wadigamangawa, 68, Sri Lankan politician, MP (1989–1994), traffic collision.
- Mahendra Yadav, 70, Indian politician, Delhi MLA (1998–2003) and convicted criminal, COVID-19.

=== 6 ===
- Inuwa Abdulkadir, 54, Nigerian politician, complications from COVID-19.
- Suresh Amonkar, 68, Indian politician, Goa MLA (2012–2017), COVID-19.
- Rosario Bléfari, 54, Argentine actress (Poor Butterfly, I, the Worst of All, Rapado), singer and writer, cancer.
- Louis Colavecchio, 78, American counterfeiter.
- Carme Contreras i Verdiales, 87, Spanish actress (El cor de la ciutat).
- Charlie Daniels, 83, American Hall of Fame country singer-songwriter and musician ("The Devil Went Down to Georgia", "Uneasy Rider"), Grammy winner (1980), hemorrhagic stroke.
- Bishnu Charan Das, 65, Indian politician, MP (2016–2017), stroke.
- Katie G. Dorsett, 87, American politician, member of the North Carolina Senate (2003–2011).
- Esparbec, 87, French pornographic author.
- Ronald Graham, 84, American mathematician (Graham's number), President of the American Mathematical Society (1993–1994), bronchiectasis.
- Hisham al-Hashimi, 47, Iraqi historian and security expert, shot.
- Julio Jiménez, 55, Bolivian politician, Deputy (since 2015), COVID-19.
- Gordon Kegakilwe, 53, South African politician, North West MEC (since 2019), COVID-19.
- Andrew Kishore, 64, Bangladeshi playback singer, non-Hodgkin's lymphoma.
- Juris Kronbergs, 73, Latvian-Swedish poet and translator.
- Mary Kay Letourneau, 58, American teacher and convicted rapist, cancer.
- Steve Madge, 72, English birder and author.
- Ennio Morricone, 91, Italian film composer (The Good, the Bad and the Ugly, Once Upon a Time in the West, The Hateful Eight), Oscar winner (2016), complications from a fall.
- Zithulele Patrick Mvemve, 79, South African Roman Catholic prelate, Auxiliary Bishop of Johannesburg (1986–1994) and Bishop of Klerksdorp (1994–2013).
- Zdzisław Myrda, 69, Polish Olympic basketball player (1980).
- Mark Naley, 59, Australian footballer (South Adelaide, Carlton), brain cancer.
- Joe Porcaro, 90, American percussionist (The Wrecking Crew).
- Giuseppe Rizza, 33, Italian footballer (Juve Stabia, Arezzo, Pergocrema), complications from ruptured brain aneurysm.
- Song Jinsheng, 87, Chinese politician, Vice-Chairman of the Peasants' and Workers' Democratic Party (1992–2007).
- Osvaldo Sosa, 72, Argentine football player (Club Almagro, Argentinos Juniors) and manager (Talleres de Córdoba), complications from a stroke.
- Zoran Stojković, 73, Serbian politician, Minister of Justice (2004–2007).
- Ernst Zacharias, 96, German electronic musician and engineer.
- Sergey Zagraevsky, 55, Russian-Israeli painter, architectural historian and theologian, heart failure.
- Deborah Zamble, 48, Canadian chemist, brain hemorrhage.

=== 7 ===
- Hernán Alemán, 65, Venezuelan exiled politician, Deputy (since 2011) and mayor of Cabimas (1989–1996, 2000–2008), complications from COVID-19.
- Jale Aylanç, 72, Turkish actress (Suskunlar).
- George Boyd, 68, Canadian playwright and news anchor (CBC Newsworld).
- Dannes Coronel, 47, Ecuadorian footballer (El Nacional, Macará, national team), heart attack.
- Gilbert Doucet, 64, French rugby union player and coach (FC Lourdes, RC Toulonnais).
- Millicent S. Ficken, 86, American ethologist.
- Elizabeth Harrower, 92, Australian novelist (Down in the City, The Watch Tower, In Certain Circles).
- Bob Hitchens, 68, American football player and coach (Miami RedHawks).
- Khalid bin Saud Al Saud, 95, Saudi prince.
- Henry Krtschil, 87, German composer and pianist.
- Yves Lever, 78, Canadian film historian and academic.
- Frank Odds, 74, English mycologist.
- Bill Ramsey, 76, English rugby league player (Leeds, Hull, Hunslet).
- Juan Rosai, 79, Italian-born American pathologist.
- Mike Ryan, 78, American baseball player (Boston Red Sox, Philadelphia Phillies).
- Jay Severin, 69, American radio talk show host (WOR, WTKK, Blaze Media) and political consultant, stroke.
- R. Sundarrajan, Indian politician, Tamil Nadu MLA.
- Henk Tennekes, 69, Dutch toxicologist, active euthanasia for pulmonary disease.
- P. D. G. Thomas, 90, Welsh historian.
- Chynybaĭ Tursunbekov, 59, Kyrgyz politician, President of the Supreme Council (2016–2017), pneumonia.
- Wolfgard Voß, 94, German Olympic gymnast (1952).
- Wang Jiafan, 81, Chinese historian.
- Dhansiri Weerasinghe, 84, Sri Lankan cricketer (national team).
- Wally Wolf, 78, American baseball player (California Angels).

=== 8 ===
- Jean-Claude Alibert, 71, French rally racer.
- Norman Allinger, 92, American chemist.
- Daniel Alvarado, 70, Venezuelan actor (La revancha, Pecado de amor, My Sweet Fat Valentina), fall.
- F. G. Bailey, 96, British social anthropologist.
- Amadou Gon Coulibaly, 61, Ivorian politician, Prime Minister (since 2017).
- Jagdeep, 81, Indian actor (Sholay, Purana Mandir, Andaz Apna Apna) and comedian.
- Finn Christian Jagge, 54, Norwegian alpine skier, Olympic champion (1992), gastric volvulus.
- Jimmy Johnson, 80, Nigerian actor (The Village Headmaster), surgery complications.
- Liliane Klein-Lieber, 96, French resistance member (Eclaireuses et Eclaireurs israélites de France).
- E. Walter Miles, 86, American political scientist and legal scholar.
- Wayne Mixson, 98, American politician, Governor of Florida (1987), member of the Florida House of Representatives (1967–1978).
- Eldon A. Money, 89, American politician, member of the Utah House of Representatives (1974–1979) and Senate (1980–1997).
- Ricardo Mthembu, 50, South African politician, mayor of KwaDukuza (2011–2019), COVID-19.
- Tetsutaro Murano, 90, Japanese film director (Fuji sanchō, Gassan).
- Santiago Nsobeya, 70, Equatoguinean politician, Minister of Foreign Affairs (1999–2003).
- Munah Pelham-Youngblood, 36, Liberian politician, member of the House of Representatives (since 2011).
- José Antonio Pérez Sánchez, 72, Mexican Roman Catholic prelate, Bishop of the Territorial Prelature of Jesús María del Nayar (1992–2010).
- Ross Pritchard, 95, American academic administrator, Chancellor of the University of Denver (1978–1984).
- Alex Pullin, 32, Australian Olympic snowboarder (2010, 2014, 2018), snowboard cross world champion (2011, 2013), drowned.
- Naya Rivera, 33, American actress (Glee, The Royal Family, Step Up), model and singer, drowned.
- Noloyiso Sandile, 56, South African royal, Regent of the Royal House of the AmaRharhabe, COVID-19.
- Howard Schoenfield, 62, American tennis player, complications from COVID-19.
- Lyudmila Stanukinas, 89, Kazakhstani documentary filmmaker.
- Abdelmajid Tlemçani, 82, Tunisian footballer (Espérance Sportive de Tunis, national team).
- Brad Watson, 64, American author and academic, heart failure.
- William Wolff, 93, German-British journalist and rabbi.
- Flossie Wong-Staal, 72, Chinese-American virologist, pneumonia.
- Jelko Yuresha, 83, Croatian-born British ballet dancer and choreographer.

=== 9 ===
- Johnny Beattie, 93, Scottish actor (River City) and comedian (Scotch & Wry, Rab C. Nesbitt).
- Maurice Born, 76, Swiss architect and sociologist.
- Francis X. Coppinger, 85, American politician.
- Gary William Crawford, 67, American writer and small press publisher.
- Roland Desné, 89, French philosopher and writer.
- Ken Felton, 71, English footballer (Darlington).
- Franz Frauneder, 92, Austrian Olympic rower (1948).
- Jean-François Garreaud, 74, French actor (Violette Nozière, A Simple Story, I as in Icarus).
- Ranjon Ghoshal, 65, Indian theatre director and musician (Moheener Ghoraguli).
- Sahara Khatun, 77, Bangladeshi politician, Minister of Home Affairs (2009–2012) and Posts and Telecommunications (2012–2013), MP (since 2009).
- Mohamed Kouradji, 68, Algerian football referee, COVID-19.
- Antonio Krastev, 59, Bulgarian weightlifter, world champion (1985, 1986), traffic collision.
- Cam Millar, 92, Canadian athlete.
- Sylvia Martínez Elizondo, 72, Mexican politician, Senator (2016–2018).
- Bruce Nestande, 82, American politician, heart attack.
- Park Won-soon, 64, South Korean politician, mayor of Seoul (since 2011), suicide.
- Hafiz Rahim, 36, Singaporean footballer (Geylang United, Gombak United, national team), traffic collision.
- Bob Sabourin, 87, Canadian ice hockey player (Toronto Maple Leafs).
- Vladimir Salkov, 83, Russian football player and manager (Shakhtar Donetsk, Rotor Volgograd).
- Jakob Tanner, 73, Swiss Olympic wrestler.
- Tong Binggang, 92, Chinese physicist.
- Gabriella Tucci, 90, Italian operatic soprano.
- Elizabeth Vallance, 75, British philosopher.
- Joseph Vidal, 87, French politician, National Assembly member for Aude (1978–1993).

=== 10 ===
- Ben Acton, 92, Australian Olympic ice hockey player (1960).
- Morris Cerullo, 88, American Pentecostal televangelist, founder of The Inspiration Network, pneumonia.
- Ananda Mohan Chakrabarty, 82, Indian-American microbiologist (Diamond v. Chakrabarty).
- Jack Charlton, 85, English football player (Leeds United, national team) and manager (Republic of Ireland national team), world champion (1966), lymphoma and dementia.
- Robert Curtis Clark, 83, Canadian politician, Alberta MLA (1960–1981).
- Arthur Cox, 59, American football player (Atlanta Falcons, San Diego Chargers, Cleveland Browns).
- Michael Cullen, 73–74, Irish painter.
- Johnny Cusack, 92, Irish Gaelic footballer (Cavan, Lavey).
- Corra Dirksen, 82, South African rugby player (Northern Transvaal, national team), complications from COVID-19.
- Vikas Dubey, 56, Indian gangster and convicted murderer, shot.
- Peter Duren, 85, American mathematician, complications from Parkinson's disease.
- Eddie Gale, 78, American jazz trumpeter.
- Andrés Indriðason, 78, Icelandic television producer.
- Miloš Jakeš, 97, Czech politician, First Secretary of the Communist Party (1987–1989).
- Wolfgang Jerat, 65, German football player and coach.
- Ghaida Kambash, 46, Iraqi politician (Council of Representatives of Iraq), COVID-19.
- Ferenc Koncz, 60, Hungarian politician, MP (1998–2002, 2004–2006, 2010–2014, since 2018), traffic collision.
- Cosmas Magaya, 66, Zimbabwean mbira musician, COVID-19.
- Panagiotis Manias, 87, Greek basketball player, drowned.
- Colin Milner Smith, 83, British judge and cricketer.
- Pep Mòdol, 62, Spanish politician and writer, Deputy (1989–1993) and Senator (1996–2000), cancer.
- Paik Sun-yup, 99, South Korean military officer.
- Dick Passwater, 93, American racecar driver.
- Mahmoud Reda, 90, Egyptian dancer, choreographer and Olympic gymnast (1952).
- Michael M. Richter, 82, German mathematician and computer scientist.
- Lara van Ruijven, 27, Dutch short track speed skater, Olympic bronze medallist (2018) and world champion (2019), autoimmune disease.
- Alfredo Sirkis, 69, Brazilian politician, Deputy (2011–2014), traffic collision.
- Steve Sutherland, British club and radio disc jockey (Choice FM, Galaxy FM).
- Olga Tass, 91, Hungarian gymnast, Olympic champion (1956).
- Genevieve Westcott, 65, Canadian-born New Zealand journalist and television presenter, breast cancer.
- Ed Wild, 85, Canadian Olympic basketball player (1956).
- Dick Williams, 92, American magician.

=== 11 ===
- Marc Angelucci, 52, American attorney and men's rights activist, shot.
- Jyotsna Bhatt, 80, Indian ceramicist and potter.
- Frank Bolling, 88, American baseball player (Detroit Tigers, Milwaukee/Atlanta Braves).
- Al Gagne, 78, American curler, world champion (1965).
- Robert Gnaizda, 83, American civil rights lawyer.
- Kyaw Hein, 72, Burmese actor (Kanyar Pyo Nae Zayar Ao, Sone Yay, Wai Lae Mhway Kyway Lae Mhway), complications from a stroke.
- A. H. Jami, 77, Indian cartoonist.
- Patti Karr, 88, American actress.
- Edward Kmiec, 84, American Roman Catholic prelate, Bishop of Nashville (1992–2004) and Buffalo (2004–2012).
- Nicholas Lash, 86, English theologian.
- Lim Boo Liat, 93, Malaysian zoologist.
- Florence Littauer, 92, American self-help author.
- Jacques Mazoin, 91, French rugby union player and coach (US Dax, Paris UC).
- Mary Miller, 90, English actress (Crown Court, EastEnders).
- Désiré Mukanirwa Kadhoro, 51, Congolese Anglican bishop, COVID-19.
- Rich Priske, 52, Canadian bassist, heart attack.
- Tõnu Puu, 83, Estonian-born Swedish economist.
- Maynard Reece, 100, American wildlife artist.
- Engel Reinhoudt, 74, Dutch troubadour and dialect writer.
- Sergey Smiryagin, 56, Russian Olympic swimmer (1980).
- Donald Whiston, 93, American ice hockey player, Olympic silver medallist (1952).
- J. R. Williamson, 77, American football player (Oakland Raiders, Boston Patriots).

=== 12 ===
- Jack Ah Kit, 69, Australian politician, Northern Territory MLA (1995–2005).
- Hassan Abshir Farah, 75, 9th Prime minister of somalia, COVID-19.
- Miryana Basheva, 73, Bulgarian poet.
- Doris Beck, 91, American politician.
- Rod Bernard, 79, American singer ("This Should Go On Forever").
- Raymundo Capetillo, 76, Mexican actor (Rosa salvaje, Corazón salvaje), COVID-19.
- Divya Chouksey, 29, Indian actress and singer, cancer.
- Joanna Cole, 75, American children's writer (The Magic School Bus), pulmonary fibrosis.
- Alain Desvergnes, 88, French photographer.
- Kevin Dwyer, 91, New Zealand cricketer (Auckland).
- Judy Dyble, 71, English singer-songwriter (Fairport Convention, Trader Horne), lung cancer.
- Hassan Abshir Farah, 75, Somali politician, Prime Minister (2001–2003) and MP (since 2012).
- Bill Gilbreth, 72, American baseball player (Detroit Tigers, California Angels), complications from heart surgery.
- Mohamed Abdi Hashi, Somali politician, President of Puntland (2004–2005).
- Jane Campbell Hutchison, 87, American art historian.
- Huey Johnson, 87, American environmentalist.
- Ignat Kaneff, 93, Bulgarian-Canadian construction executive and philanthropist.
- Nelson Meurer, 77, Brazilian politician, Deputy (1995–2019), mayor of Francisco Beltrão (1989–1993), COVID-19.
- Gerard Collier, 5th Baron Monkswell, 73, British hereditary peer.
- Manuel Moroun, 93, American transportation executive, heart failure.
- Alfred Mtsi, 69, South African politician, mayor of Buffalo City (2015–2016), COVID-19.
- Frank Popper, 102, Czech-born French-British art and technology historian.
- Kelly Preston, 57, American actress (Jerry Maguire, Twins, Sky High), breast cancer.
- Henrik Ripa, 52, Swedish politician, MP (2010–2014).
- Nagindas Sanghavi, 100, Indian political columnist.
- Jarno Sarkula, 47, Finnish musician (Alamaailman Vasarat).
- Eleanor Sokoloff, 106, American pianist.
- Wim Suurbier, 75, Dutch football player (Ajax, national team) and manager (Tampa Bay Rowdies), cerebral hemorrhage.
- Lajos Szűcs, 76, Hungarian footballer (Ferencvárosi, Budapest Honvéd, national team), Olympic champion (1968).

=== 13 ===
- Hasan al-Lawzi, 68, Yemeni writer and politician, Acting Prime Minister (2011), COVID-19.
- Luis Arias Graziani, 94, Peruvian air force officer and politician, Minister of Defence (1978–1980) and Chief of the Joint Command (1979), COVID-19.
- Nurul Islam Babul, 74, Bangladeshi business magnate, chairman of Jamuna Group, COVID-19.
- Christian Biet, 68, French writer and professor.
- Ian Black, 76, Australian politician.
- Eugene Chelyshev, 98, Russian Indologist.
- Kenneth Church, 90, American jockey, pneumonia and COVID-19.
- Barrie Cook, 91, British abstract artist.
- Moses Costa, 69, Bangladeshi Roman Catholic prelate, Archbishop of Chittagong (since 2017), stroke.
- Bernard Cottret, 69, French historian and literary scholar.
- Hadi Dahane, 76, Moroccan footballer (Union Sidi Kacem, national team).
- Carl Gafford, 66, American comic book artist (Legion of Super-Heroes, Fantastic Four, Star Trek), complications from diabetes.
- Sergio González, 59, Argentine footballer (Instituto).
- Marilyn Howard, 81, American politician.
- Chuck Hulse, 92, American Hall of Fame racing driver.
- Grant Imahara, 49, American electrical engineer (Star Wars, The Matrix) and television personality (MythBusters), brain aneurysm.
- Gerardo Juraci Campelo Leite, 88, Brazilian politician, Piauí MLA (1983–1991, 1995–2015), complications from COVID-19.
- Delphine Levy, 51, French museum director (Paris Musées).
- Camilo Lorenzo Iglesias, 79, Spanish Roman Catholic prelate, Bishop of Astorga (1995–2015).
- Zindzi Mandela, 59, South African politician and diplomat.
- Daniel David Moses, 68, Canadian poet and playwright.
- Pat Quinn, 84, Scottish football player (Motherwell, national team) and manager (East Fife).
- Debendra Nath Roy, 64–65, Indian politician, West Bengal MLA (since 2016), hanging.
- Borghild Røyseland, 93, Norwegian politician, MP (1985–1993).
- Fahim Saleh, 33, Bangladeshi-American web developer and entrepreneur, stabbed.
- Zeng Yi, 91, Chinese virologist.

=== 14 ===
- Adalet Ağaoğlu, 90, Turkish novelist and playwright, multiple organ failure.
- Tolulope Arotile, 24, Nigerian helicopter pilot, traffic collision.
- James Victor Brown, 85, Australian rugby union player.
- Gabriele Buschmeier, 65, German musicologist.
- Tim Clark, 84, British physician.
- Galyn Görg, 55, American actress (RoboCop 2, M.A.N.T.I.S., Point Break) and dancer, cancer.
- Bea Gorton, 73, American college basketball coach (Indiana Hoosiers).
- Keith Guzah, Zimbabwean politician.
- Polad Hashimov, 45, Azerbaijani military officer, shot.
- Dinah Hinz, 86, German actress and voice actress.
- Brian Hutton, Baron Hutton, 88, British jurist, Lord Chief Justice of Northern Ireland (1989–1997) and Lord of Appeal in Ordinary (1997–2004).
- Muhammad Mohaiminul Islam, 78, Bangladeshi military officer, Chief of Naval Staff (1991–1995), COVID-19.
- Ronald Johnson, 76, American politician, member of the Alabama House of Representatives (since 1978), liver cancer.
- Jindřich Kabát, 67, Czech psychologist and politician, Minister of Culture (1992–1994).
- Caesar Korolenko, 86, Russian psychiatrist, COVID-19.
- Daniel Lewis Lee, 47, American white supremacist and convicted triple murderer, execution by lethal injection.
- Dave Lewis, 65, American football player (Tampa Bay Buccaneers, San Diego Chargers, Los Angeles Rams).
- J. J. Lionel, 72, Belgian musician ("La danse des canards").
- Ron de Lugo, 89, American politician.
- Maria Lugones, 76, Argentine feminist philosopher.
- Madame Zo, 64, Malagasy textile artist.
- Noël Martin, 60, Jamaican-born British assisted suicide activist and neo-Nazi victim.
- Alex McCool, 96, American NASA manager.
- Luis Orán Castañeda, 41, Colombian racing cyclist, conveyor belt accident.
- Susan Quimpo, 59, Filipino activist and author.
- Sir Desmond Rice, 95, British army officer and courtier.
- Maurice Roëves, 83, Scottish actor (Oh! What a Lovely War, Escape to Victory, The Last of the Mohicans).
- Arthur Samberg, 79, American businessman, leukemia.
- Abolghasem Sarhaddizadeh, 75, Iranian politician, Minister of Labour and Social Affairs (1983–1989) and MP (1990–1992, 1996–2004).
- Milan Šašik, 67, Slovak-born Ukrainian Ruthenian Catholic hierarch, Bishop of Mukachevo (since 2002).
- John Schaeffer, 79, Dutch-born Australian art collector and businessman, traffic collision.
- Shajahan Siraj, 77, Bangladeshi politician, MP (1986–1991) and co-founder of Jatiya Samajtantrik Dal, cancer.
- Noemi Steuer, 63, Swiss actress (Die Zweite Heimat).
- Stephen Susman, 79, American attorney, COVID-19.
- Juan Uder, 93, Argentine basketball player, world champion (1950).

=== 15 ===
- Carlotta Barilli, 84, Italian actress (Ragazzi del Juke-Box, Howlers in the Dock, La commare secca).
- Mateo Caparas, 96, Filipino lawyer and politician.
- Severino Cavalcanti, 89, Brazilian politician, Deputy (1995–2005), complications from diabetes.
- Igor Chernykh, 88, Russian cinematographer (The Diamond Arm, Particularly Important Task, Private Detective, or Operation Cooperation).
- Elias Farkouh, 72, Jordanian novelist, heart attack.
- Catherine Freeman, 88, British television producer.
- Paul Fusco, 89, American photojournalist, dementia.
- Juan José García Corral, 68, Spanish bullfighter.
- Ivar Genesjö, 89, Swedish Olympic fencer (1964).
- Louw de Graaf, 90, Dutch politician.
- Sayed Haider, 95, Bangladeshi language movement activist, pneumonia.
- Stan Hindman, 76, American football player (San Francisco 49ers).
- David Humphries, 66, English cricketer (Leicestershire, Worcestershire).
- David Kaiser, 50, American philanthropist, glioblastoma multiforme.
- Arnol Kox, 67, Dutch street preacher.
- Oscar Hugh Lipscomb, 88, American Roman Catholic prelate, Archbishop of Mobile (1980–2008).
- Hem Lumphat, 43, Cambodian Olympic swimmer (1996).
- Travell Mazion, 24, American boxer, NABF super welterweight champion, traffic collision.
- Nancy McArthur, 88, American author.
- Nigel Murch, 76, Australian cricketer (Victoria, Northamptonshire).
- Kieran O'Connor, 41, Irish Gaelic footballer (Aghada, Cork), Ewing's sarcoma.
- Enrico Perucconi, 95, Italian Olympic sprinter.
- Ana Romero Reguera, 88, Spanish fighting bull rancher.
- Eugenio Scarpellini, 66, Italian-born Bolivian Roman Catholic prelate, Auxiliary Bishop (2010–2013) and Bishop of El Alto (since 2013), COVID-19.
- Tonia Shand, 80, Australian diplomat.
- George Simon, 73, Guyanese artist and archeologist, cancer.
- Sir Toke Talagi, 69, Niuean diplomat and politician, MP (1999–2020) and Premier (2008–2020).
- Mohd Khusairi Abdul Talib, 59, Malaysian politician, Perak State MLA (since 2004), heart attack.

=== 16 ===
- David Bobihoe Akib, 64, Indonesian politician, Regent of Gorontalo (2005–2015).
- Rudolf Babiak, 64, Slovak Olympic gymnast.
- Ken Chinn, 57, Canadian punk rock vocalist (SNFU).
- Roger Côté, 80, Canadian ice hockey player (Edmonton Oilers, Indianapolis Racers).
- Christopher Dickey, 68, American journalist, news editor (The Daily Beast) and author, heart attack.
- Tony Elliott, 73, English publisher, founder of Time Out Group.
- Patrick Ellis, 77, American radio host, complications from COVID-19.
- Mason Gaffney, 96, American economist.
- Marcus Gaither, 59, American-French basketball player.
- Ted Gerela, 76, Canadian football player (BC Lions).
- Mustapha Karkouti, 77, Syrian journalist, heart attack.
- Karl Heinrich Kaufhold, 87, German historian.
- Janis Kravis, 84, Latvian-born Canadian architect.
- Marie-Christine Lévesque, 61–62, Canadian author, brain cancer.
- Azuma Morisaki, 92, Japanese film director (Tora-san, His Tender Love, Time and Tide, Pecoross' Mother and Her Days), stroke.
- Cornelius Mwalwanda, Malawian economist and politician, COVID-19.
- Norm Neeson, 86, Australian footballer (North Melbourne).
- Vladimir Obuchov, 84, Russian basketball coach (MBC Dynamo Moscow, Soviet Union national team, Malta national team).
- Jamie Oldaker, 68, American drummer (Eric Clapton, The Tractors).
- Omaswati, 54, Indonesian comedian.
- Jonathan Oppenheim, 67, American film editor (Paris Is Burning, The Oath), brain cancer.
- Elmer Pato, 66, Filipino taekwondo practitioner, COVID-19.
- Wesley Ira Purkey, 68, American convicted murderer, execution by lethal injection.
- Rick Reed, 70, American baseball umpire.
- Neela Satyanarayanan, 72, Indian civil servant, COVID-19.
- Phyllis Somerville, 76, American actress (The Big C, Little Children, The Curious Case of Benjamin Button).
- Frank Sutton, 91, American politician.
- Tony Taylor, 84, Cuban baseball player (Chicago Cubs, Philadelphia Phillies, Detroit Tigers), complications from a stroke.
- Frits Tellegen, 101, Dutch urban designer.
- Alexei Tezikov, 42, Russian ice hockey player (Washington Capitals, Vancouver Canucks, HC Lada Togliatti), heart attack.
- Víctor Víctor, 71, Dominican singer-songwriter and guitarist, COVID-19.
- Horst Wenninger, 81-82, German physicist.
- Delphine Zanga Tsogo, 84, Cameroonian writer, feminist and politician, Deputy (1965–1972).

=== 17 ===
- Emajuddin Ahamed, 86, Bangladeshi political scientist and academic administrator, Vice-Chancellor of the University of Dhaka (1992–1996), cardiac arrest.
- Ekaterina Alexandrovskaya, 20, Russian-Australian Olympic pair skater (2018), junior world champion (2017), suicide by jumping.
- Gian Franco Anedda, 89, Italian politician, Deputy (1992–2006).
- Moussa Benhamadi, 67, Algerian politician and executive, COVID-19.
- Brigid Berlin, 80, American artist, pulmonary embolism.
- Pierre-Marie Coty, 92, Ivorian Roman Catholic prelate, Bishop of Daloa (1975–2005).
- Josephine Cox, 82, English author.
- Alex Dawson, 80, Scottish footballer (Manchester United, Preston North End, Brighton & Hove Albion).
- Seyfi Dursunoğlu, 87, Turkish comedian and television presenter (Dans Eder misin?), pneumonia.
- Julian Farrand, 84, English legal academic, pulmonary embolism.
- Peter Ford, 86, English footballer (Port Vale, Macclesfield Town, Stoke City).
- Dominic Foreman, 86, Australian politician, Senator (1981–1997).
- Zenon Grocholewski, 80, Polish Roman Catholic cardinal, Prefect of the Congregation for Catholic Education (1999–2015).
- Imre Holényi, 94, Hungarian Olympic sailor.
- Derek Ho, 55, American surfer, world champion (1993), heart attack.
- Barry Jarman, 84, Australian cricketer (South Australia, national team).
- Zizi Jeanmaire, 96, French ballet dancer (Carmen).
- John Lewis, 80, American civil rights leader and politician, member of the U.S. House of Representatives (since 1987), Presidential Medal of Freedom recipient (2011), pancreatic cancer.
- Shirley Love, 87, American broadcaster (WOAY-TV) and politician, member of the West Virginia Senate (1994–2008) and House of Delegates (2017–2019).
- Volodymyr Lozynskyi, 65, Ukrainian football player (Dynamo Kyiv) and manager (Vorskla Poltava).
- Silvio Marzolini, 79, Argentine footballer (Ferro Carril Oeste, Boca Juniors, national team), complications from a stroke and cancer.
- D. K. Mensah, 66, Ghanaian banker and economist, CEO of Ghana Association of Bankers.
- John Neale, 93, English Anglican clergyman, Bishop of Ramsbury (1974–1988).
- Angela von Nowakonski, 67, Brazilian physician, COVID-19.
- Thomas O'Regan, 64, Australian media theorist and academic.
- J. I. Packer, 93, British-born Canadian evangelical theologian (Knowing God).
- Marcuse Pfeifer, 83, American gallerist.
- Bill Scott, 74, British Anglican priest, Deputy Clerk of the Closet (2007–2015).
- C. S. Seshadri, 88, Indian mathematician (Seshadri constant).
- Michael Silverstein, 74, American linguist and anthropologist, brain cancer.
- Andrzej Strzelecki, 68, Polish actor, satirist and screenplay writer, rector of Aleksander Zelwerowicz National Academy of Dramatic Art in Warsaw (2008–2016), lung cancer.
- Ron Tauranac, 95, British-Australian engineer and racing car designer, co-founder of Brabham.
- C. T. Vivian, 95, American author and civil rights activist, Presidential Medal of Freedom recipient (2013).
- Marian Więckowski, 86, Polish racing cyclist, Tour de Pologne winner (1954, 1955, 1956).

=== 18 ===
- Vishnu Raj Atreya, 75, Nepali writer and poet, gallbladder cancer.
- Peggy Batchelor, 103, British actress.
- Charles Bukeko, 58, Kenyan actor and comedian (The Captain of Nakara), COVID-19.
- Daniel M. Burnham, 90, American politician.
- Elize Cawood, 68, South African actress (Dis ek, Anna), lung cancer.
- Paul Cunningham, 82, American Nazarene minister and superintendent (1993–2009).
- Ismail Ebrahim, 73, South African cricketer (Natal).
- Sylvia Gale, 70, American activist and politician, member of the New Hampshire House of Representatives (2012–2014), cancer.
- Sanjiv Sam Gambhir, 57, Indian-born American physician, cancer.
- Ray Hannigan, 93, Canadian-born American ice hockey player (Toronto Maple Leafs).
- Robert Hellenga, 78, American writer and academic.
- Katherine B. Hoffman, 105, American chemist and academic administrator, COVID-19.
- Ashraf Hossain, 79, Bangladeshi politician, MP (1991–1996, 2006–2008), cancer.
- Lenzie Howell, 52, American basketball player (Red Giants, Cholet, Bourg-en-Bresse).
- David Jisse, 74, French composer, cancer.
- Myrzageldy Kemel, 71, Kazakhstani academic and politician, Deputy (1995–2004).
- Paul Kiener, 74, American director and cinematographer.
- Hubert Kitchen, 91, Canadian politician, member of the Newfoundland and Labrador House of Assembly.
- Moonyeenn Lee, 76, South African casting director, talent agent and producer, complications from COVID-19.
- Boško Marinko, 81, Serbian Olympic wrestler (1968, 1972).
- Juan Marsé, 87, Spanish novelist, journalist and screenwriter, renal failure.
- Colin Mason, 93, Australian journalist, author and politician, Senator (1978–1987).
- Maura McNiel, 99, American women's rights activist.
- Ali Mirzaei, 91, Iranian weightlifter, Olympic bronze medalist (1952).
- Martha Mmola, South African politician, MP (2014–2019), COVID-19.
- Haruma Miura, 30, Japanese actor (Koizora, Kimi ni Todoke, Attack on Titan) and singer, suicide by hanging.
- David Romero Ellner, Honduran journalist, lawyer, politician and convicted rapist, COVID-19.
- Jope Ruonansuu, 56, Finnish actor, musician and stand-up comedian (Jopet Show), esophageal cancer.
- Jaybee Sebastian, 40, Filipino convicted kidnapper and carjacker, COVID-19.
- Henrique Soares da Costa, 57, Brazilian Roman Catholic prelate, Bishop of Palmares (since 2014), COVID-19.
- Manuel C. Sobreviñas, 96, Filipino Roman Catholic prelate, Bishop of Imus (1993–2001).
- Keith Sonnier, 78, American sculptor and artist.
- Baba Ibrahim Suma-Keita, 73, Sierra Leonean Olympic long-distance runner (1980, 1988).
- Lucio Urtubia, 89, Spanish counterfeiter, robber and kidnapper (Anarchist Federation).
- Craig Weatherhill, 69, English novelist and bard.
- Alefoso Yalayalatabua, 43, Fijian rugby union player (Highlanders, Warriors, national team).
- Abdel Aziz Zaibi, 67, Tunisian Olympic handball player.

=== 19 ===
- Sultan Hashim Ahmad al-Tai, 76, Iraqi military officer and convicted war criminal, Minister of Defence (1995–2003), heart attack.
- Biri Biri, 72, Gambian footballer (Wallidan Banjul, Sevilla, national team).
- Bruce G. Blair, 72, American nuclear security expert and scholar, stroke.
- Oreste Casalini, 58, Italian sculptor and painter, lung cancer.
- David Cliche, 68, Canadian politician.
- Giulia Maria Crespi, 97, Italian non-profit executive and environmentalist, founder of Fondo Ambiente Italiano.
- Sonia Darrin, 96, American actress (Bury Me Dead, Federal Agent at Large).
- Doris Dartey, Ghanaian journalist, complications from cancer.
- Seydou Diarra, 86, Ivorian politician, Prime Minister (2000, 2003–2005).
- Louis Dicaire, 73, Canadian Roman Catholic prelate, Auxiliary Bishop of Montreal (1999–2004) and Saint-Jean-Longueuil (since 2004).
- Sapardi Djoko Damono, 80, Indonesian poet, multiple organ failure.
- Denise Domenach-Lallich, 95, French resistance member.
- Cor Fuhler, 55, Dutch-Australian experimental musician.
- Momoko Iko, 80, American playwright.
- Mikołaj Kubica, 74, Polish Olympic gymnast (1964, 1968, 1972).
- Jack McIlhargey, 68, Canadian ice hockey player and coach (Vancouver Canucks, Philadelphia Flyers, Hartford Whalers), cancer.
- Lorenzo Milam, 86, American writer.
- Joan Moriarty, 97, British military nurse, Matron-in-chief of Queen Alexandra's Royal Army Nursing Corps (1977–1981).
- Giuseppe Ottaviani, 104, Italian masters athlete.
- Vladimir Proskurin, 79, Soviet football player and coach.
- Emitt Rhodes, 70, American singer-songwriter ("Live") and musician (The Palace Guard, The Merry-Go-Round).
- Viktor Ryashko, 56, Ukrainian football player (Nyva Ternopil) and manager (Hoverla Uzhhorod), traffic collision.
- István Séllyei, 70, Hungarian Olympic wrestler (1976).
- Shanthamma, 95, Indian actress.
- Shukrullo, 98, Uzbek poet.
- Nikolai Tanayev, 74, Kyrgyz politician, Prime Minister (2002–2005).
- Margaret Waterchief, 88, Canadian Blackfoot elder and Anglican priest, complications from COVID-19.
- Franciszek Ziejka, 79, Polish literary historian, rector of Jagiellonian University (1999–2005).

=== 20 ===
- Muhammad Aslam, 73, Pakistani jurist, Justice of the Supreme Court (2009–2012) and Chief Justice of Islamabad High Court (2008–2009), COVID-19.
- Hal Bernson, 89, American politician, member of the Los Angeles City Council (1979–2003).
- Boka, 71, Azerbaijani singer.
- Michael Brooks, 36, American political commentator (The Majority Report with Sam Seder), internal jugular vein thrombosis.
- Victor Chizhikov, 84, Russian children's book illustrator, designer of Misha.
- Saskia Cohen-Tanugi, 61, French theatre director.
- Neil Crang, 70, Australian racing driver, cancer.
- Ross Dallow, 82, New Zealand police officer.
- Lone Dybkjær, 80, Danish politician, Minister for the Environment (1988–1990), cancer.
- Roy Den Hollander, 72, American lawyer and murderer, perpetrator of the Salas home shooting, suicide by gunshot.
- Ismaila Isa Funtua, 78, Nigerian politician, cardiac arrest.
- Mirja Jämes, 95, Finnish Olympic hurdler (1948).
- Charmian Johnson, 80–81, Canadian artist and potter.
- Gunther Kaschlun, 85, German Olympic rower (1956).
- Ruth Lewis, 74, Pakistani Roman Catholic nun, co-founder of Darul Sukun, COVID-19.
- Robert Martin, 71, American editor.
- Salman Mazahiri, Indian Islamic scholar and chancellor of Mazahir Uloom, Saharanpur.
- Bijay Mohanty, 70, Indian actor (Naga Phasa, Sahara Jaluchi).
- Kenneth L. Peek Jr., 87, American lieutenant general.
- Frazier Reams Jr., 90, American politician.
- Doug Rogers, 79, Canadian judoka, Olympic silver medallist (1964).
- Abdel Majid Senoussi, 60, Tunisian Olympic judoka.
- Ram Awadhesh Singh, 83, Indian politician, MP (1977–1979, 1986–1992).
- Mike Slemen, 69, English rugby union player (Liverpool, national team).
- Harry Smith, 85, Canadian ice hockey player.
- Günter-Helge Strickstrack, 99, German politician, founding member of the CDU.
- Shane Tuck, 38, Australian footballer (Richmond), suicide.
- Jorge Villavicencio, 62, Guatemalan surgeon, Minister of Public Health and Social Assistance (2012–2014), COVID-19.
- Geoff Williams, 89, Australian footballer (Geelong).

=== 21 ===
- François Amoudruz, 93, French resistance member and Holocaust survivor.
- Jos Bax, 74, Dutch footballer (FC Eindhoven, Helmond Sport, VVV-Venlo).
- Jean-Noël de Bouillane de Lacoste, 85, French ambassador and diplomat.
- Dobby Dobson, 78, Jamaican reggae singer and record producer, COVID-19.
- Eva Lois Evans, 85, American educator.
- Cheikh Sadibou Fall, 69, Senegalese politician, Minister of the Interior (2004).
- Suka K. Frederiksen, 55, Greenlandic politician, Foreign Minister (2017–2018).
- Mieko Hirota, 73, Japanese singer, heart failure.
- Dean Ing, 89, American author.
- Alice Koller, 94, American author and academic.
- Li Jijun, 87, Chinese geographer and geomorphologist.
- Margaret McIver, 86, Australian Olympic equestrian (1984).
- Hugh McLaughlin, 75, Scottish footballer (St Mirren, Third Lanark, Queen of the South).
- Bruce McPhail, 83, New Zealand rugby union player (Canterbury, Nelson, national team).
- Andrew Mlangeni, 95, South African political activist (Rivonia Trial).
- Lennox Napier, 92, British major general.
- Sean O'Mahony, 88, British music writer and magazine editor (The Beatles Book, Record Collector).
- Stanley Robinson, 32, American basketball player (Iowa Energy, Moncton Miracles, Reales de La Vega).
- Francisco Rodríguez Adrados, 98, Spanish Hellenist, translator and linguist, member of the Royal Spanish Academy.
- Annie Ross, 89, British-American jazz singer (Lambert, Hendricks & Ross), songwriter ("Twisted"), and actress (Superman III), complications from emphysema and heart disease.
- Howie Schwarzman, 92, American magician.
- Michelle Senlis, 87, French songwriter and lyricist.
- Susan Sizemore, 69, American novelist.
- Tim Smith, 59, English singer-songwriter (Cardiacs, The Sea Nymphs, Spratleys Japs).
- Wouter Snijders, 92, Dutch judge and legal scholar, Justice (1970–1986) and Vice President (1986–1998) of the Supreme Court.
- Eric Sweeney, 72, Irish composer.
- Lalji Tandon, 85, Indian politician, Governor of Bihar (2018–2019) and Madhya Pradesh (2019–2020).
- Halldóra K. Thoroddsen, 70, Icelandic writer.
- Bob Wallace, 69, Australian-born American runner.
- Kansai Yamamoto, 76, Japanese fashion designer, acute myeloid leukemia.

=== 22 ===
- John Boyagis, 92, British Olympic alpine skier (1948, 1952).
- Jim Carruthers, 79, American politician.
- Zacharias Chaliabalias, 74, Greek footballer (Iraklis, national team).
- Dino De Poli, 90, Italian lawyer and politician, Deputy (1968–1972).
- Charles Dewachtere, 92, Belgian Olympic marathon runner (1952).
- Theo Diergaardt, 50, Namibian politician.
- Eulogius, 83, Russian Orthodox prelate, Metropolitan of Vladimir and Suzdal (1990–2018).
- Charles Evers, 97, American civil rights activist, disc jockey and politician, mayor of Fayette, Mississippi (1969–1981, 1985–1989).
- Joan Feynman, 93, American astrophysicist.
- Richard Fielder, 95, American television writer (Marcus Welby, M.D., Gunsmoke, The Waltons).
- Dirk Geukens, 57, Belgian motocross racer (1990 and 1991 Motocross World Championship medalist).
- John Greatrex, 83, English cricketer.
- Alexander Gusev, 73, Russian ice hockey player, Olympic champion (1976).
- Carlton Haselrig, 54, American wrestler, football player (Pittsburgh Steelers, New York Jets) and mixed martial artist, NCAA Wrestling Division I and II champion (1987–1989).
- Aleksandr Ivanitsky, 82, Russian wrestler, Olympic champion (1964).
- Ralph Liguori, 93, American racing driver (NASCAR Cup Series, USAC Championship Car series).
- Tom Mitchell, 88, Irish republican and politician, MP (1955).
- Paul Reale, 77, American composer and pianist, prostate cancer.
- Raoul Sarrazin, 81, Canadian Olympic boxer (1960).
- Bob Sebra, 58, American baseball player (Montreal Expos, Philadelphia Phillies, Cincinnati Reds), multiple organ failure.
- Chito Soganub, 59, Filipino Roman Catholic priest and kidnap victim, cardiac arrest.
- Tony Turner, 90, English archdeacon.
- Luzius Wildhaber, 83, Swiss jurist, President of the European Court of Human Rights (1998–2007).

=== 23 ===
- Mike Adams, 55, American columnist (The Daily Wire) and professor (University of North Carolina Wilmington), suicide by gunshot.
- Lamine Bechichi, 92, Algerian politician.
- Ronald Bergan, 82, South African-born British film historian and writer, pyelonephritis.
- John Blake, 59, American football player and coach (Oklahoma Sooners), heart attack.
- Dick Bond, 84, American politician, member of the Kansas Senate (1987–2001).
- John Bradbury, 79, Australian footballer (Footscray).
- Jean Brankart, 90, Belgian racing cyclist.
- Hassan Brijany, 59, Swedish actor, COVID-19.
- Éric de Cromières, 66, French sporting (ASM Clermont Auvergne) and tire executive (Michelin), cancer.
- Emmanuel Farhi, 41, French economist.
- Jerome Farris, 90, American jurist, Judge of the U.S. Court of Appeals for the Ninth Circuit (since 1979).
- Alan Garner, 69, English footballer (Luton Town, Watford, Millwall).
- Noel Jenke, 73, American football player (Minnesota Vikings, Atlanta Falcons, Green Bay Packers).
- Tomas Joson III, 72, Filipino politician, Governor of Nueva Ecija (1992–1995, 1998–2007).
- Ove König, 70, Swedish Olympic speed skater (1972).
- Masakazu Konishi, 87, Japanese neurobiologist.
- Jacqueline Noonan, 91, American pediatric cardiologist.
- Ward Plummer, 79, American physicist.
- Leida Rammo, 96, Estonian actress (A Young Retiree, The Fencer) and theatre director.
- Sérgio Ricardo, 88, Brazilian film director (The Night of the Scarecrow), composer (Black God, White Devil) and singer, heart failure.
- Bohuslav Rylich, 86, Czech Olympic basketball player.
- José Said, 90, Chilean real estate developer, founder chairman of Parque Arauco S.A. (since 1979).
- Paolo Sassone-Corsi, 64, Italian molecular biologist (French National Centre for Scientific Research, University of California, Irvine).
- Jacqueline Scott, 89, American actress (Macabre, Duel, The Fugitive), lung cancer.
- Betti Sheldon, 85, American politician.
- Dominic Sonic, 55, French singer.
- Jerry Taft, 77, American meteorologist (WLS-TV, WMAQ-TV).
- Ludmila Vachtová, 86, Czech historian and art critic.
- Geoffrey Walton, 86, British Anglican priest, Archdeacon of Dorset (1982–2000).
- Stuart Wheeler, 85, British financier and political activist, founder of IG Group and Treasurer of UKIP (2011–2014), stomach cancer.
- Paulette Wilson, 64, Jamaican-British human rights activist.

=== 24 ===
- Nina Andreyeva, 81, Russian chemist and politician, General Secretary of the All-Union Communist Party of Bolsheviks (since 1991).
- Claude Beausoleil, 71, Canadian writer and poet.
- Joanne Beretta, 86, American cabaret singer, complications from a fall.
- Bo Black, 74, American festival director (Summerfest) and Playboy cover girl.
- Richard Brettell, 71, American art historian and museum curator, cancer.
- Ondřej Buchtela, 20, Czech ice hockey player (Piráti Chomutov, HC Benátky nad Jizerou), heart cancer.
- Humbert Camerlo, 76, French opera director (Bluebeard's Castle, The Gypsy Baron).
- Rene Carpenter, 92, American columnist and television personality, heart failure.
- Robert F. Coverdale, 89, American lieutenant general.
- Roberto Draghetti, 59, Italian voice actor, heart attack.
- H. George Frederickson, 86, American academic.
- Jean-Marc Gabaude, 92, French philosopher.
- Ray Grant, 86, Canadian curler.
- Malcolm Green, 84, British inorganic chemist.
- David Hagen, 47, Scottish footballer (Falkirk, Clyde, Peterhead), motor neuron disease.
- James Hughes Hancock, 89, American jurist, Judge of the U.S. District Court for Northern Alabama (since 1973).
- Delwar Hossain, 85–86, Bangladeshi politician.
- Ben Jipcho, 77, Kenyan athlete, Olympic silver medallist (1972).
- Denise Idris Jones, 69, Welsh politician.
- Nejib Ben Khalfallah, 52–53, Tunisian dancer and choreographer.
- Nicolai Lomov, 74, Russian-born American pianist.
- John Machacek, 80, American journalist (The Times-Union).
- Claude-Gérard Marcus, 86, French politician, MP (1968–1997).
- Benjamin Mkapa, 81, Tanzanian politician, President (1995–2005), heart attack as a complication of malaria.
- Bernard Mohlalisi, 87, Lesothan Roman Catholic prelate, Archbishop of Maseru (1990–2009).
- Kundi Paihama, 75, Angolan politician, MP (since 2018).
- Regis Philbin, 88, American entertainer and television personality (The Joey Bishop Show, Live with Regis and Kathie Lee, Who Wants to Be a Millionaire), heart attack.
- Naazim Richardson, 55, American boxing trainer.
- Lotty Rosenfeld, 77, Chilean artist.
- Amala Shankar, 101, Indian dancer and actress (Kalpana).
- Barry St. John, 77, Scottish singer ("Come Away Melinda").
- Ann Syrdal, 74, American psychologist and computer science researcher, developed the first female-sounding voice synthesizer.
- Jan Verroken, 103, Belgian politician (Chamber of Representatives, Flemish Parliament, European Parliament), mayor of Oudenaarde (1983–1988).
- Zheng Shouren, 80, Chinese engineer, chief designer of the Three Gorges Dam.
- Claudio Zupo, 35, Mexican judoka, COVID-19.

=== 25 ===
- Azimzhan Askarov, 69, Kyrgyz journalist and human rights activist, pneumonia.
- Charlie Balducci, 44, American reality TV personality (True Life).
- Božena Böhmová, 95, Czech actress (Žena za pultem).
- Jean Boin, 71, French footballer (Reims, Lens).
- Peter Bowler, 86, Australian lexicographer.
- Roger Buckley, 82–83, American academic.
- Angelo Carossino, 91, Italian politician, MEP (1979–1989) and President of Liguria (1975–1979).
- Mogens Christensen, 90, Norwegian Olympic luger (1964).
- Steve dePyssler, 101, American Air Force colonel, COVID-19.
- Jim Frick, 68, Swedish horse harness racer.
- Peter Green, 73, English Hall of Fame blues rock singer-songwriter ("Black Magic Woman") and guitarist (Fleetwood Mac, Peter Green Splinter Group).
- Lou Henson, 88, American Hall of Fame college basketball coach (Hardin-Simmons, New Mexico State, Illinois) and administrator, non-Hodgkin lymphoma.
- Flor Isava Fonseca, 99, Venezuelan journalist and sports executive.
- Lady Red Couture, 43, American drag queen, complications of cyclic vomiting syndrome.
- Bernard Ładysz, 98, Polish opera singer and actor (The Doll, The Quack, Pierścień i róża).
- C. P. Lee, 70, English musician (Alberto y Lost Trios Paranoias).
- Giulio Maceratini, 82, Italian politician, MEP (1988).
- Thomas J. McCormick, 87, American historian.
- José Mentor, 71, Brazilian lawyer and politician, Deputy (2003–2019), COVID-19.
- Helga Offen, 68, German Olympic volleyball player.
- Maurice Petty, 81, American Hall of Fame racing driver, crew chief and engine builder.
- Pauline Pirok, 93, American baseball player (Kenosha Comets, South Bend Blue Sox).
- Velvet Rhodes, 70, American actress.
- Turíbio Ruiz, 90, Brazilian actor, voice actor, television and radio presenter, stroke.
- John Saxon, 83, American actor (A Nightmare on Elm Street, Enter the Dragon, Joe Kidd), pneumonia.
- Eddie Shack, 83, Canadian ice hockey player (Toronto Maple Leafs, New York Rangers, Pittsburgh Penguins), four-time Stanley Cup winner (1962–1964, 1967), cancer.
- Janell Smith, 73, American Olympic sprinter (1964), cancer.
- Soe Win, 59, Burmese bodyguard (Aung San Suu Kyi), heart disease.
- Luciano Fabio Stirati, 97, Italian politician, Senator (1963–1968, 1972–1976).
- Richard L. Weldon, 87, Canadian politician.
- Helen Jones Woods, 96, American trombonist, COVID-19.

=== 26 ===
- Jim Abbott, 77, Canadian politician, MP (1993–2011).
- Edmund Ansin, 84, American television executive, co-founder of Sunbeam Television.
- Rafael Barraza Sánchez, 91, Mexican Roman Catholic prelate, Bishop of Mazatlán (1981–2005).
- R. Stephen Berry, 89, American physical chemist.
- Alain Cacheux, 72, French politician, heart attack.
- Brian Chewter, 66, Canadian Olympic cyclist (1972, 1976).
- Tereza Costa Rêgo, 91, Brazilian painter, stroke.
- Dame Olivia de Havilland, 104, French-British-American actress (Gone with the Wind, The Adventures of Robin Hood, To Each His Own), Oscar winner (1947, 1950).
- Bill English, 91, American computer engineer, co-developer of the computer mouse, respiratory failure.
- Alison Fiske, 76, English actress (For Services Rendered), cancer.
- Francisco Frutos, 80, Spanish politician, General Secretary of the Communist Party of Spain (1998–2009), cancer.
- Claudia Giannotti, 83, Italian actress (Il Prof. Dott. Guido Tersilli, primario della clinica Villa Celeste, convenzionata con le mutue).
- Roscoe Hansen, 90, American football player (Philadelphia Eagles).
- Guy Lutgen, 84, Belgian politician, Minister of Agriculture in the Walloon Government (1988–1999), mayor of Bastogne (1976–2000) and Senator (1977–1995).
- Chris Needs, 66, Welsh radio broadcaster (BBC Radio Cymru), heart condition.
- George Paterson, 79, New Zealand Olympic rower.
- Alireza Raheb, 53, Iranian poet, songwriter and literary critic, COVID-19.
- Lluís Serrahima, 88, Spanish writer, co-creator of Nova Cançó.
- Robert Smith, 55, Canadian actor. (body discovered on this date)
- Anne K. Stokowski, 94, American politician, member of the Minnesota Senate (1979–1982).
- Hans-Jochen Vogel, 94, German politician, Minister of Justice (1974–1981), Leader of the SPD (1987–1991), complications from Parkinson's disease.
- John Weeks, 79, American economist.
- Roger Williams, 88, British hepatologist.
- Willie Young, 77, American football player (New York Giants).

=== 27 ===
- Israfil Alam, 54, Bangladeshi politician, MP (since 2009), complications from COVID-19.
- Héber Ansorena, 64, Uruguayan Olympic sailor.
- Owen Arthur, 70, Barbadian politician, Prime Minister (1994–2008), heart failure.
- Carol Brock, 96, American food critic, respiratory failure.
- Felicia F. Campbell, 89, American academic, COVID-19.
- Lars-Göran Carlsson, 71, Swedish Olympic sports shooter (1980).
- Kathy Charmaz, 80, American sociologist, cancer.
- AKM Amanul Islam Chowdhury, 83, Bangladeshi political advisor, COVID-19.
- Bernard Cleary, 83, Canadian politician, MP (2004–2006).
- Vic Ekberg, 88, Australian Olympic ice hockey player.
- Frank Guilford, 92, American politician.
- Sir John Guinness, 84, British civil servant and businessman.
- William Hill, 75, Hong Kong Olympic sprinter (1964).
- Frank Howard, 81, American politician, member of the Louisiana House of Representatives (2008–2020), complications from COVID-19.
- Radhi Jazi, 92, Tunisian pharmacist.
- Kina Kadreva, 88, Bulgarian children's book writer.
- Magda Kósáné Kovács, 79, Hungarian politician, MEP (2004–2009).
- Muhammad Asad Malik, 78, Pakistani field hockey player, Olympic champion (1968), traffic collision.
- María de la Cruz Paillés, 78, Mexican archaeologist.
- Jan Skopeček, 94, Czech actor (Hroch, Tam, kde hnízdí čápi) and playwright.
- Khalil Taha, 88, Lebanese wrestler, Olympic bronze medallist (1952).
- Doug Taylor, 82, Canadian historian, professor, and author.
- Gianrico Tedeschi, 100, Italian actor (Susanna Whipped Cream, Secret Fantasy, Dr. Jekyll Likes Them Hot).
- Terry Waters, 76, Australian footballer (Collingwood), cancer.

=== 28 ===
- Aleksandr Aksinin, 65, Russian athlete, Olympic champion (1980).
- Daphne Athas, 96, American author.
- Junrey Balawing, 27, Filipino record holder, world's shortest man (since 2015).
- Roland Boullanger, 81, French Olympic swimmer (1960).
- Crybaby Waldo, 54, American professional wrestler (ECW), heart attack.
- Eugénio Eleutério, 99, Portuguese Olympic runner (1952).
- Bent Fabric, 95, Danish pianist and composer ("Alley Cat").
- Mo Gaba, 14, American sports radio personality, cancer.
- José Luis García Ferrero, 90, Spanish veterinarian and politician, Minister of Agriculture, Fisheries and Food (1982).
- Gisèle Halimi, 93, Tunisian-French lawyer and feminist.
- Gerry Harris, 84, English footballer (Wolverhampton Wanderers).
- Kurt Hennrich, 88, Czech Olympic alpine skier (1956).
- Gísli Rúnar Jónsson, 67, Icelandic actor.
- Kul Bahadur Khadka, 69, Nepali military officer, Acting Chief of Army Staff (2009), pancreatic cancer.
- Jerzy Konieczny, 69, Polish lawyer and civil servant, chief of UOP (1992–1993), Minister of the Interior (1995–1996).
- Martin Konings, 91, Dutch politician, MP (1973–1986).
- Kumkum, 86, Indian actress (Ganga Maiyya Tohe Piyari Chadhaibo, Mr. X in Bombay, Gunah Aur Kanoon).
- Herbert Leuninger, 87, German Catholic priest, theologian and human rights activist (Pro Asyl).
- Sir Bruce Liddington, 70, British headteacher.
- Sydney Lotterby, 93, British television producer (Last of the Summer Wine, Yes Minister, Open All Hours).
- John Loxley, 77, English-born Canadian economist.
- Mohamed Mashally, Egyptian physician.
- Masango Matambanadzo, 56, Zimbabwean politician, MP (since 2013).
- John McNamara, 88, American baseball manager (San Diego Padres, Cincinnati Reds, Boston Red Sox).
- Nicholas Micozzie, 89, American politician, member of the Pennsylvania House of Representatives (1979–2014).
- Joseph Moingt, 104, French Jesuit priest.
- Bill Montgomery, 80, American political activist, co-founder of Turning Point USA, COVID-19.
- Paul Morin, 96, French politician, mayor of Bourg-en-Bresse (1989–1995).
- Bob Neloms, 78, American jazz pianist.
- Marcel Plasman, 95, Belgian politician, pneumonia.
- Irene Pollin, 96, American sports executive and philanthropist, co-owner of the Washington Capitals and the Washington Wizards.
- Clive Ponting, 74, British civil servant and historian.
- Donald Prell, 96, American venture capitalist and futurist.
- Raavi Kondala Rao, 88, Indian actor (Ramudu Bheemudu, Preminchi Choodu, Jeevitha Chakram), cardiac arrest.
- Diana E. H. Russell, 81, South African feminist activist and writer.
- Reese Schonfeld, 88, American television executive, president of CNN (1980–1982) and founder of Food Network.
- Anna Simková, 89, Slovak stage actress.
- S. L. Stebel, 97, American author.

=== 29 ===
- Salko Bukvarević, 53, Bosnian politician, complications from COVID-19.
- Albin Chalandon, 100, French politician, Minister of Justice (1986–1988).
- Connie Culp, 57, American face transplant recipient, complications from an infection.
- Ayo Fasanmi, 94, Nigerian politician, MP (since 1983).
- Anatoli Fedyukin, 68, Russian handball player, Olympic champion (1976).
- Mike Gillespie, 80, American baseball player and coach (USC Trojans, national team), complications from a stroke.
- Dave Gray, 77, American baseball player (Boston Red Sox).
- Oz Griebel, 71, American banker and lawyer, traffic collision.
- Andy Haden, 69, New Zealand rugby union player (Auckland, national team), chronic lymphocytic leukaemia.
- Sheikh Md. Nurul Haque, 79, Bangladeshi politician, MP (1991–2001, 2014–2019), COVID-19.
- Joe Kernan, 74, American politician, Governor (2003–2005) and Lieutenant Governor (1997–2003) of Indiana, mayor of South Bend (1988–1997), complications from Alzheimer's disease.
- Kees Kievit, 89, Dutch Olympic swimmer.
- Michio Kinugasa, Japanese composer (Utawarerumono, Living for the Day After Tomorrow).
- Harold D. Langley, 95, American naval historian.
- Dave Mackay, 88, American jazz pianist.
- Malik B., 47, American rapper (The Roots).
- Bob McCurdy, 68, American basketball player (Richmond Spiders), anal cancer.
- Mark V. Meierhenry, 75, American lawyer, Attorney General of South Dakota (1979–1987).
- Hernán Pinto, 67, Chilean politician, mayor of Valparaíso (1990–1992, 1992–2004), COVID-19.
- André Ptaszynski, 67, British theatre producer.
- David Ramsay, 72, Australian-born Canadian politician, Ontario MPP (1985–2011).
- Ajip Rosidi, 82, Indonesian writer and poet.
- Betty Rowlands, 96, American author.
- Perrance Shiri, 65, Zimbabwean military officer and politician, Minister of Agriculture (since 2017) and Commander of the Air Force (1992–2017), COVID-19.
- Giorgio Todde, 68, Italian writer.
- R. Toros, 85, Syrian-born French sculptor.
- Don Townsend, 89, English footballer (Charlton Athletic, Crystal Palace).
- Winston Williams, 62, English chess player, suicide by jumping.
- Bob Wilson, 86, Canadian ice hockey player (Chicago Blackhawks).

=== 30 ===
- Randy Barlow, 77, American country singer, cancer.
- Karen Berg, 77, American author, co-founder of the Kabbalah Centre.
- Maarten Biesheuvel, 81, Dutch writer.
- Herman Cain, 74, American food executive (Godfather's Pizza, Pillsbury Company) and politician, chair of the Federal Reserve Bank of Kansas City (1995–1996), complications of COVID-19.
- Bob Dearing, 85, American politician, member of the Mississippi State Senate (1980–2012, 2016–2019).
- Pino Grioni, 88, Italian painter, sculptor and ceramist.
- Leslie Iversen, 82, British pharmacologist.
- Amy Kaplan, 66, American academic and author, glioblastoma.
- Lee Teng-hui, 97, Taiwanese politician, President (1988–2000), Vice President (1984–1988) and mayor of Taipei (1978–1981), multiple organ failure.
- Somen Mitra, 78, Indian politician, MP (2009–2014) and West Bengal MLA (1972–1977, 1982–2009), multiple organ failure.
- Anil Murali, 56, Indian actor (Nakshatratharattu, Ivar), liver disease.
- Ashoke Mustafi, 86, Indian cricketer (Bengal).
- Alan Petherbridge, 92, British Olympic judoka (1964).
- Juan Ramón, 80, Argentine singer and actor, complications from pneumonia.
- Mark Rocco, 69, English professional wrestler (ASW, IWE, NJPW).
- Lionel Rocheman, 92, French actor, musician, and writer (I Don't Know Much, But I'll Say Everything, Red Kiss).
- Noel Rose, 92, American immunologist, stroke.
- Helen Sanger, 96, American librarian.
- Jorge Santibáñez Ceardi, 86, Chilean politician, mayor of Viña del Mar (1994–1996) and Deputy (1965–1973).
- Toshimitsu Tanaka, 90, Japanese composer, lung cancer.
- Sonam Tshering Lepcha, 92, Indian folk musician.
- Michael Yama, 76, American actor (G.I. Joe: A Real American Hero, Dumb and Dumber To, Dead Rising).
- Robert Zink, 91, American mathematician.

=== 31 ===
- Robert John Audley, 91, British psychologist.
- Dominique Aulanier, 46, French footballer (Saint-Étienne, Nice).
- Martin Barner, 99, German mathematician.
- Mike Clark, 73, American film critic (USA Today), injuries sustained from a fall.
- André Darrieussecq, 93, French rugby union player (Biarritz Olympique, national team).
- Maria Friesenhausen, 88, German soprano and academic teacher.
- Mike Gale, 70, American basketball player (Kentucky Colonels, New York Nets, Portland Trail Blazers).
- Sa. Kandasamy, 80, Indian novelist and filmmaker, heart attack.
- Jocelyne Khoueiry, 64, Lebanese militant and activist.
- Gary Knopp, 63, American politician, member of the Alaska House of Representatives (since 2017), plane collision.
- Gilles Lapouge, 96, French writer and journalist.
- Giulio Lazzarini, 93, Italian politician, mayor of Lucca (1994–1998).
- Eusebio Leal, 77, Cuban historian (Old Havana).
- Hans Ljungberg, 72, Swedish Olympic swimmer.
- Bill Mack, 88, American country music disc jockey (WBAP), songwriter ("Blue", "Drinking Champagne"), Grammy winner (1997), and radio host, COVID-19.
- Sir Alan Parker, 76, English film director (Midnight Express, Pink Floyd – The Wall, Mississippi Burning), BAFTA winner (1977, 1979, 1992).
- Zamuxolo Peter, 55, South African politician, MP (since 2019), COVID-19.
- Tamás Pomucz, 63, Hungarian Olympic sailor (1992).
- R. D. Pradhan, 92, Indian civil servant.
- Gwilym Morris Roberts, 95, British civil engineer.
- Wim Scherpenhuijsen Rom, 87, Dutch banker, founder of ING.
- Yury Savenko, 59, Russian politician, Mayor of Kaliningrad (1998–2007).
- Stephen Tataw, 57, Cameroonian footballer (Tonnerre Yaoundé, Olympic Mvolyé, national team).
- Bert Thiel, 94, American baseball player (Boston Braves).
- Joan Mari Torrealdai, 77, Spanish writer and journalist, cancer.
- Guy Verhoeven, 82, Belgian Olympic hockey player (1964).
- ruth weiss, 92, American poet, complications from a series of strokes.
- Musa Yerniyazov, 72, Uzbek politician, complications from COVID-19.
- Miodrag Živković, 92, Serbian sculptor.
