= Boin =

Boin is the last name shared by the following people:

- Bruno Boin (b. 1937), American basketball player
- Jean Boin (1949–2020), French footballer
- Victor Boin (1886–1974), Belgian freestyle swimmer, water polo player, and épée fencer

== See also ==
- Choi Bo-in, Korean beauty pageant contestant
