= Kaufhold =

Kaufhold is a surname of German origin. Notable people with the surname include:

- Ann-Katrin Kaufhold (born 1976), German jurist
- Casey Kaufhold (born 2004), American archer
- Gerhard Kaufhold (1928–2009), German footballer
- Hubert Kaufhold (born 1943), German judge
- Karl Heinrich Kaufhold (1932–2020), German economic historian
- Otmar Kaufhold (1952–2001), German rower
