= Olena Tsvek =

Ukrainian archaeologist (1931–2020)

Olena Vasylivna Tsvek (Ukrainian: Олена Василівна Цвек, 3 August 1931 – 5 July 2020) was a Ukrainian archaeologist specialising in the Neolithic Trypillia culture.

== Education and career ==
Tsvek was born in Kyiv on 3 August 1931. She studied history and archaeology at Kyiv University, under L.M. Slavin and S.M. Bibikov, graduating in 1959. She was a researcher at the NASU Institute of Archaeology from 1959 until her retirement in 2002. Tsvek was awarded the Vikentiy Khvoyka Prize in 2005. She died on 5 July 2020, aged 88.

== Trypillia research ==
Tsvek's research was focused on the Neolithic Trypillia culture, particularly in the region of the Southern Bug and Dnieper. She was the first to demonstrate that this region had its own distinct character – sometimes known as the "East Trypillia culture". Her candidate dissertation, defended in 1987, was on the Trypillia culture of the Bug–Dnieper interfluve.

From the late 1960s, Tsvek directed a number of large-scale excavations at eastern Trypillia sites, including Shkarivka (1969–73), Garbusyn, Bachkuryne (1971–73), Zarubyntsi, Kharkivka (1974–75), Lisovi Hrynivtsi (1974–76), Veselyi Kut (1975–85, 1993), Tarashcha (1982), Vilkhovets II (1984), Onopriivka (1984–85, 1993), Korobchyne, Rybyany Most (1988–89), and Berezivka (1989–2004). She also discovered the sites of Hreblya, Shkarivka, Tarashcha and Khrystynivka.
