= Luciano Fabio Stirati =

Italian politician (1922–2020)

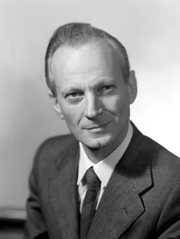
Luciano Fabio Stirati

Luciano Fabio Stirati (15 December 1922 – 25 July 2020) was an Italian politician.

Stirati was born in Gubbio on 15 December 1922, and taught Latin and Greek at the Giuseppe Mazzatinti School. He represented the Italian Socialist Party for two nonconsecutive terms in the Senate, from 1963 to 1968, and from 1972 to 1976. Stirati died on 25 July 2020 at the Branca Hospital.

His son, Filippo Mario Stirati, has served as mayor of Gubbio and vice president of the province of Perugia.
