= Joseph Moingt =

French theologian (1915–2020)

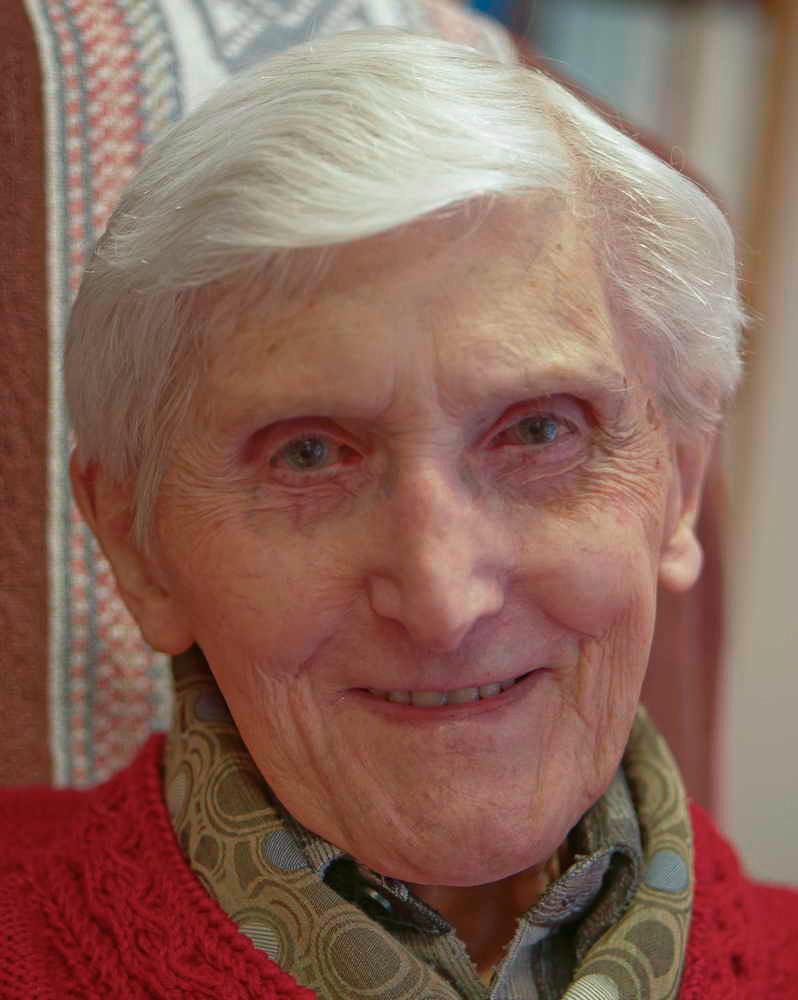

Joseph Moingt (19 November 1915 – 28 July 2020) was a French Jesuit priest. He was born in Salbris, France. He was known for working at the Institut Catholique de Paris. From 1970 to 1997, he was director of the Recherches de science religieuse. In 2015, he turned 100. He was the author of multiple religious books, including L'Esprit du Christianisme in 2018, with the subject matter focusing on promoting faith and "evangelical humanism".

Moingt first became a member of the Jesuits at 23 during WWII and was sent to various places throughout Germany and Poland in the years afterward, before being ordained as a priest in 1949.

Moingt died on 28 July 2020 in Paris, aged 104.
