= Alice Koller =

American writer and academic (1925–2020)

- Born: September 13, 1925; Cuyahoga Falls, Ohio, U.S.
- Died: July 21, 2020 (aged 94); Trenton, New Jersey, U.S.
- Occupation: Writer
- Parent(s): Andrew R. Koller; Sarah L. Koller

Alice Koller (September 13, 1925 – July 21, 2020) was an American writer and academic.

== Childhood and education ==
Alice Koller was born in Cuyahoga Falls, Ohio on September 13, 1925. Her father Andrew R. Koller was a plumbing salesman who later owned a plumbing supply store in Akron, Ohio, where she grew up. Her mother Sarah L. Koller was a housewife. She had an older brother, Kenneth, and a younger sister, Muriel.

After graduating as her class Valedictorian from Buchtel High School in 1943, she worked for the Goodyear Tire and Rubber Company for a year, then moved to Chicago to attend drama classes at the Goodman Theatre school of drama. While there, she won a national contest for "the best radio voice" held by the radio show People Are Funny. She left the Goodman school after two years and enrolled at the University of Chicago, but left without graduating. She was selected as a student guest editor at Mademoiselle in the summer of 1948 (a position held five years later by Sylvia Plath).

Koller earned her bachelor's degree from the University of Akron in 1952. She then attended Radcliffe College as a graduate student, gaining her doctorate in philosophy from Harvard in 1960. Her dissertation was titled, "The Concept of Emotion: A Study of the Analyses of James, Russell, and Ryle." Her family could not afford to provide much financial support, so Koller depended upon scholarships, fellowships, and part-time jobs, working by her own count over thirty jobs in the space of 15 years. While attending Harvard, she was awarded a patent for a unique way of constructing sleeves for garments.

== Work ==
Koller struggled unsuccessfully to land a permanent position after graduating from Harvard, taking a series of short-term jobs instead: "Four months in New York, three in Cambridge as though I hadn't fled it. Two months in Berkeley, four in Santa Barbara. Boston. New York again." Finally, in the winter of 1962, she rented a house in Siasconset, on the eastern end of Nantucket Island, Massachusetts and spent three months there in almost complete isolation aside from a German shepherd puppy she named Logos. She hoped that the time would "let me understand who I am and what I want." "Being a philosopher," she later said, "I knew how to think and to know what counted as tough questions. I knew not to accept anything less than tough answers and kept pressing and pressing and pressing myself." She turned her journal of this stay into a book she titled "A Map for an Inward Journey." It would later be published as An Unknown Woman.

While on Nantucket, she was hired by Dr. Harold Wooster, chief of the information sciences division of the Air Force Office of Scientific Research to prepare an analysis of the linguistic challenges involved in machine translation. This report became her first book, A Hornbook of Hazards for Linguists, published in 1967. She was offered a teaching position at Connecticut College following her Air Force contract, but chose to finish her memoir instead. Permanent posts continued to elude her. She taught or worked as a consultant for the University of Waterloo, Cornell University, Harvard University, the National Institutes of Health, and as a speechwriter for a congressman.

When Washington Star reporter Judy Flander interviewed Koller in 1977, however, she was unemployed and living on food stamps near Warrenton, Virginia. She also owed legal fees from a suit she had filed against a Silver Spring, Maryland veterinary clinic over the 1974 death of Logos, the dog who'd accompanied Koller on her stay on Nantucket.

It took fourteen years and rejections from thirty different publishers before Holt, Rinehart & Winston accepted the book in 1981. It proved an unexpected bestseller, going into several printings. The Kirkus Reviews reviewer predicted that Koller's "groping for certainty within loneliness, depression, and fear may strike a chord in many," and the book continued to be widely read for years after going out of print. Following its publication, Koller was hired by The New York Times to write a short series of articles titled "Hers" that appeared in late 1983.

She lived off the royalties from An Unknown Woman for several years, then returned to a life of short-term consulting and teaching jobs. In 1990, she published The Stations of Solitude, which drew upon the model of the Stations of the Cross and outlined thirteen stations with themes such as "Unbinding," "Working," and "Standing Open." She saw the book as "a line of travel," through "the process of shaping a human being, and the stations are stopping places in the process." Like An Unknown Woman, however, the book was heavily autobiographical and went over many of the same experiences discussed in the earlier book. The resulting reviews were less enthusiastic: "Koller seems to be writing for herself, failing to invite readers into her exclusive domain of solitude," wrote Francisca Goldsmith in Library Journal. In an essay included in Herspace: Women, Writing, and Solitude, however, Christina Pugh applauded Koller for both the courage of her writings and "the immense cultural need for such an exemplar."

Koller lived in New England for most of the decades following The Stations of Solitude and continued to take on occasional speaking and writing jobs. In 2008 at the age of 83, she established a website (now defunct) where she solicited patrons to help fund a work in progress titled “Meditation on Being a Philosopher.” She moved to New Jersey several years before her death and died at a Trenton, New Jersey hospital in 2020.

== Works ==
- A Hornbook of Hazards for Linguists (1967)
- An Unknown Woman (1981)
- Stations of Solitude (1990)
