= Katherine B. Hoffman =

American chemist and academic administrator (1914–2020)

- Born: August 1, 1914; Winter Haven, Florida
- Died: July 18, 2020 (aged 105); Tallahassee, Florida
- Other names: Kitty B. Hoffman
- Occupations: Chemist and academic administrator

Katherine "Kitty" Marie Blood Hoffman (August 1, 1914 – July 18, 2020) was an American chemist and academic administrator.

== Education and career ==
Hoffman was born on August 1, 1914, in Winter Haven, Florida. She attended the Florida State College for Women (which later became Florida State University) for her undergraduate. She began her degree in 1932, and finished with a degree in bacteriology in 1936. She went on to Columbia University for a master's degree in chemistry, which she completed in 1938.

Hoffman returned to Florida State College for Women in 1940, where she remained through its name-change to Florida State University and for the rest of her career. She began as a chemistry instructor, and was promoted, reaching full professor in 1959. She served as dean of women from 1967 to 1970, in which role she eased restrictions placed upon female students. She retired from the university in 1984, but remained active in university service during retirement.

== Awards and honors ==
Upon the occasion of her retirement, the chemistry department of Florida State University named a laboratory building in her honor; it was rededicated to her in 2018. Hoffman was awarded an honorary doctorate by Florida State University in 2007.

== Death ==
Amid the COVID-19 pandemic in Florida, Hoffman died from COVID-19 in Tallahassee on July 18, 2020, at the age of 105, fourteen days short from her 106th birthday.
