= Toshimitsu Tanaka =

Japanese composer (1930–2020)

Toshimitsu Tanaka (田中 利光, Tanaka Toshimitsu; 17 July 1930 – 30 July 2020) was a Japanese composer from Aomori, Aomori. He graduated from Kunitachi College of Music with a major in composition.

His "Two Movements for Marimba", composed in 1965, was awarded the Encouraging Prize of the National Arts Festival for the Centennial Anniversary of the Meiji Period (1968), and the Supreme Prize of the National Arts Festival in 1969. The piece was recorded by Evelyn Glennie in April 1990 for her 1991 album release Light in Darkness.

His music is typical of the Japanese marimba repertoire.

Tanaka was a professor of Composition Department at Kunitachi College of Music as well as Kyiv National University of Culture and Arts.
