= Marcuse Pfeifer =

American gallerist (1936–2020)

- Born: November 4, 1936; Little Rock, Arkansas, U.S.
- Died: July 17, 2020 (aged 83); Kingston, New York, U.S.
- Occupation: Gallerist

Marcuse "Cusie" Pfeifer (November 4, 1936 – July 17, 2020) was an American gallerist. Pfeifer was an important figure in recognition of photography as a fine art, founding member and art exhibition director of the Hudson Valley LGBTQ Community Center in Kingston, New York, and a supporter of the Samuel Dorsky Museum of Art. She opened the Marcuse Pfeifer Gallery on Madison Avenue in 1976, and later moved to 568 Broadway. She helped people, including Sally Mann, Peter Hujar, and Timothy Greenfield-Sanders to launch their careers as contemporary photographers. In 1978, she curated a show of male nudes, with work by Robert Maplethorpe, Lynn Davis and Peter Hujar, prompting The New York Times reviewer to call for a return to "old-fashioned prudery".

Pfeifer died on July 17, 2020, at age 83.
