= Aurelio Moyano =

Argentinian footballer (1938–2020)

Personal information
- Date of birth: 1 August 1936
- Place of birth: Córdoba, Argentina
- Date of death: 3 July 2020 (aged 83)
- Place of death: Aix-en-Provence, France
- Position: Midfielder

Senior career*
Years	Team	Apps	(Gls)
1951	Independiante		
1954	Club Atlético Excursionistas		
1957	Quito		
1962–1964	FC Nancy		
1964	Cannes		
1964–1965	AS Aix-en-Provence		
1965–1967	Ajaccio		
- AS Béziers Hérault
- * Club domestic league appearances and goals

Aurelio Moyano (1 August 1936 – 3 July 2020) was an Argentine footballer who played midfielder.

He arrived in Europe in 1961 and attempted to join Inter Milan, however he failed to make the club's roster. After this rejection, he joined FC Nancy and helped the club become finalists for the Coupe de France, playing in 13 matches and scoring two goals. In 1964, he was transferred to Cannes in Ligue 2, where the team finished 11th that season. He played for AS Aix-en-Provence from 1964 to 1965 and Ajaccio from 1965 to 1967.
