= Kōshū Itabashi =

Japanese Zen Buddhist (1927–2020)

- Title: Zenji（閑月即心） Kancho (Religion)

Personal life
- Born: Nagaoki; 1927 Japan
- Died: 5 July 2020 (aged 92–93) Japan
- Education: Tohoku University; Naval Academy of Japan

Religious life
- Religion: Zen Buddhism
- School: Sōtō

Senior posting
- Teacher: Genshū Watanabe; Giyen Inoue
- Based in: Sojiji
- Predecessor: Ryūtan Matsumoto
- Successor: Genshū Imamura

Kōshū Itabashi (板橋 興宗, Itabashi Kōshū; 1927 – 5 July 2020) was a Sōtō Zen master who was the 23rd abbot of Sojiji, abbot of Gotanjoji in Takefu, Fukui, and abbot of Daijoji in Kanazawa, Ishikawa all in Japan.

He was born in Tagajo, Miyagi in 1927. He graduated from the Naval Academy of Japan in 1945. He also graduated in religious studies at Tohoku University in 1953. He became a Sōtō Zen monk according to Genshū Watanabe. He was trained in Sojiji and he studied under Giyen Inoue in Hamamatsu, Shizuoka.

He succeeded Ryūtan Matsumoto in Daijoji and became Tanto Roshi of Sojiji leading monks. He became Godo Roshi of Sojijisoin, abbot of Daijoji. He also devised chair Zazen.

He was elected vice abbot of Sojij, and became the 23rd abbot of Sojiji and Sotozen Superintendent Master (Kancho) in 1998.

He retired as abbot of Sojiji in 2002. He became abbot Sojijisoin. And he was revived Gotanjoji.

== Works ==
- Ryokan and Dogen (Kounsha, 1986)
- Breath of Life (Shunjusha, 2008)
- Thank you (Samgha, 2009)
- Breathing Buddha（Kadokawa, 2011）
- With a Soft Heart (Northern Press,2012)
- Living like a cat (Nigensha, 2013)
- "Atarimaedeii"（Rissho Koseikai Pub., 2015）
