= Onopryivka =

Archaeological site in Ukraine

Onopryivka Ukraine, is the site of an ancient mega-settlement dating to 4300 4000 BC belonging to the Cucuteni-Trypillian culture. The settlement was very large for the time, covering an area of 60–80 hectares (150–200 acres). This proto-city is just one of 2440 Cucuteni–Trypillia settlements discovered so far in Moldova and Ukraine. Some 194 (8%) of these settlements had an area of more than 10 hectares between 5000 and 2700 BC and more than 29 settlements had an area in the range of 100–450 hectares.

== See also ==
- Cucuteni-Trypillian culture
- Danube Valley cultures
