= Christian Garrison =

American crime writer (1942–2020)

- Born: February 14, 1942; Monroe, Louisiana, United States
- Died: July 2, 2020 (aged 78); Winston-Salem, North Carolina, United States
- Occupation: Writer

Christian Garrison (February 14, 1942 – July 2, 2020) was an American writer and author of detective novels.

== Biography ==
Garrison began his career teaching English and drama, then worked in the film industry. He published his first novel in 1973, titled Little Pieces Of The West Wind. He wrote four other novels throughout his career, with Paragon Man being his only one translated into French.

Christian Garrison died on July 2, 2020, in Winston-Salem, North Carolina, at the age of 78.

== Works ==
- Little Pieces Of The West Wind (1973)
- Flim and Flam and the Big Cheese (1975)
- The Dream Eater (1978)
- Snakedoctor (1980)
- Paragon Man (1981)
