= Tunney Lee =

Chinese-born American urban planner (1931–2020)

- Born: 1931; Taishan, China
- Died: July 2, 2020 (aged 88–89); Boston, Massachusetts, U.S.
- Known for: Chief of planning and design for the Boston Redevelopment Authority; Deputy commissioner of the state Division of Capital Planning and Operations
- Title: Professor Emeritus

Academic background
- Education: University of Michigan

Academic work
- Discipline: Architecture and planning
- Institutions: MIT

Tunney Lee (Chinese: 李燦輝, 1931 – July 2, 2020) was an American architect, planner, educator, and activist known for his community engagement work primarily in Chinatown, Boston. Lee was a professor emeritus of urban planning and a former head of the Department of Urban Studies and Planning (DUSP) within the MIT School of Architecture and Planning. He is also known as the founder of the Department of Architecture at The Chinese University of Hong Kong (CUHK), now called the School of Architecture. Lee also maintained a career in public service as chief of planning and design for the Boston Redevelopment Authority and deputy commissioner of the state Division of Capital Planning and Operations under Governor Michael S. Dukakis. He died on July 2, 2020, in Boston at the age of 88.

== Early life and education ==
Tunney Lee was born in 1931 in Taishan, China to his father, Kwang Lien Lee, a lawyer, and mother, Kam Kwai Chan. In 1938, Lee left his mother and three sisters and emigrated with his father to Boston's Chinatown when he was seven years old. He attended the Boston Latin School before graduating with a degree in architecture from the University of Michigan in 1954. The Lee family ties to the U.S. have a long history going back to Tunney Lee's great-grandfather, who worked on the transcontinental railroad in the 1860s and lived in Tacoma, Washington, before returning to China following violence and evictions against the Chinese. Lee's great-grandfather returned to the U.S. in 1892 and worked in a laundry in Bridgewater, Massachusetts, before joined by Lee's grandfather to work in a laundry on Broad Street, Boston, in 1903.

== Work ==
After graduating from the University of Michigan, Lee worked for notable architects Buckminster Fuller and I.M. Pei. In the late 1950s, Lee and his neighbors in Boston's Chinatown fought to resist the destruction of a portion of Chinatown by the planned Mass Pike connection to the Central Artery interstate highway that helped to save the home where he grew up on 73 Hudson Street. These efforts of community resistance are chronicled in Karilyn Crockett's book titled People Before Highways: Boston Activists, Urban Planners, and a New Movement for City Making. In 1968 he was part of the team (with John Wiebenson, James Goodell, and Kenneth Jadin) that designed Resurrection City, an occupation of the Washington Mall in coordination with the Poor People's Campaign.

Lee continued to grow his roots in Boston and joined MIT's Department of Urban Studies and Planning in 1970. He became tenured in 1977 and was promoted to full professor in 1985. Throughout his tenure at MIT, he worked to develop relationships with community-based organizations in Boston's Chinatown as well as Boston at large. In partnership with the Chinese Historical Society of New England, Chinatown Lantern Cultural and Educational Center, and UMass Boston Institute for Asian American Studies, Lee led MIT students to create the Chinatown Atlas.

He published the book Development politics: Private development and the public interest (Studies in state development policy) in 1979, co-authored with Robert M. Hollister.
