= Wanderley Mariz =

Brazilian politician and lawyer (1940–2020)

Interior and Justice Secretary of Rio Grande do Norte
- In office 1987–1989
- Governor: Geraldo Melo

Member of the Chamber of Deputies from Rio Grande do Norte
- In office 1975–1987

Personal details
- Born: November 2, 1940 Caicó, Rio Grande do Norte, Brazil
- Died: July 2, 2020 (aged 79) Natal, Rio Grande do Norte, Brazil
- Party: Christian Democracy (PSDC)
- Other political affiliations: ARENA (former); PDS (former); PMDB (former)
- Education: Fluminense Federal University
- Profession: Politician, lawyer

Vigolvino Wanderley Mariz (2 November 1940 – 2 July 2020), better known simply as Wanderley Mariz, was a Brazilian Politician and Lawyer from the state of Rio Grande do Norte.

== Career ==
Before pursuing a career in politics, Mariz went to college at the Fluminense Federal University and graduated in Law.

In 1974, Mariz was elected Member of the Brazilian Chamber of Deputies representing his birth state of Rio Grande do Norte. His first tenure went from 1975 to 1979.

In 1978, he was re-elected Federal Deputy for Rio Grande do Norte. This time he remained in office between 1979 and 1983.

In 1982, he was re-elected for his third and last term as a Federal Deputy. His last term went from 1983 to 1987.

In 1986, he decided to run for a spot at the Brazilian Senate representing Rio Grande do Norte, but ultimately failed to secure enough votes to be elected.

In 2008, he decided to run for Mayor of Caicó, but ultimately failed to win.

Between 1987 and 1989, Mariz worked as Secretary of Interior and Justice of his birth state after being appointed by Governor Geraldo Melo.

== Personal life and death ==
His father, Dinarte Mariz who was also a politician, held various prestigious political posts, such as: Governor of Rio Grande do Norte (1956–1961) and Senator for Rio Grande do Norte (1955–1956 and 1963–1984).

On 2 July 2020, Mariz died in Natal at the age of 79 due to complications brought on by COVID-19 during the COVID-19 pandemic in Brazil.
