= Moussa Benhamadi =

Algerian politician and researcher (1953–2020)

Member of the People's National Assembly
- In office 2002–2007

CEO of Algérie Télécom
- In office 2008–2010
- President: Abdelaziz Bouteflika
- Preceded by: Mouloud Djaziri
- Succeeded by: Mohamed Dabouz

Minister of Communication
- In office 2010–2012
- President: Abdelaziz Bouteflika
- Preceded by: Abdelhamid Besalah
- Succeeded by: Youcef Yousfi

Personal details
- Born: January 4, 1953 Ras El Oued, Algeria
- Died: July 17, 2020 (aged 67) Bordj Bou Arréridj, Algeria
- Party: National Liberation Front
- Profession: Politician

Moussa Benhamadi (4 January 1953 – 17 July 2020) was an Algerian politician and researcher. He was a member of the National Liberation Front (FLN).

== Biography ==
Benhamadi commenced his career as a computer engineer and researcher in information systems and networks. In 1985, he founded the Centre de recherche sur l'information scientifique et technique, which became the first internet provider of Algeria in 1993. He headed the center until 2002, when he was elected into the People's National Assembly, representing Bordj Bou Arréridj. In 2008, Benhamadi became CEO of Algérie Télécom, a position he held for two years. From 2010 to 2012, he served as Minister of Communication. His brother, Abderrahmane, directed Groupe Benhamadi Antar Trade-Condor, the family's telecommunications company.

Benhamadi was arrested during the 2019 protests on 18 September. He died from COVID-19 in Bordj Bou Arréridj on 17 July 2020, at the age of 67, during the COVID-19 pandemic in Algeria.
