= Ghaida Kambash =

Iraqi politician (1974–2020)

- Born: 1974; Baghdad, Iraq
- Died: 10 July 2020 (aged 46); Baghdad, Iraq
- Occupation: Politician
- Spouse: Saad Kambash

Ghaida Kambash (Arabic: غيداء كمبش; 1974 – 10 July 2020) was an Iraqi politician.

== Biography ==
Kambash was from Baquba, north of Baghdad. She earned a PhD in political sciences from the University of Baghdad. She was elected to the Council of Representatives of Iraq from 2010 till her death in 2020. She campaigned shortly before her death for a reform of the education system.

Kambash died in Baghdad on 10 July 2020, aged 46 due to COVID-19 during the COVID-19 pandemic in Iraq.
