= Alireza Raheb =

Iranian poet, songwriter, writer, and literary critic (1967–2020)

Alireza Raheb (Tehran, 17 January 1967 – Tehran, 26 July 2020) was an Iranian poet, songwriter, writer and literary critic. He was the director of the Vandad Literary Association.

== Biography ==
Alireza Raheb Mazandarani was born in Tehran on January 17, 1967. He was graduate in law from the University of Tabriz. He started composing poetry in the 1980s and many of his poems, articles and critiques were published in various publications. During his ten years in Tabriz, he studied Turkish language and literature and benefited from the presence of people such as Bahman Sarkarati.

"Two Cups of Chehel-Giah Distillate" and "Part-Time Love" were his main collections of poetry books. He had an active presence in literary societies and poetry sessions and managed the Vandad Literary Society.

Alireza Raheb died on 26 July 2020, at the age of 53, at Atieh Hospital in Tehran from COVID-19 during its pandemic in Iran.
