= Xu Qifeng =

Chinese engineer (1936–2020)

- 许其凤
- Born: January 5, 1936; Tianjin, China
- Died: July 2, 2020 (aged 84); Beijing, China
- Education: PLA Institute of Surveying and Mapping
- Scientific career
- Fields: Satellite navigation
- Workplaces: PLA Information Engineering University

Chinese name
- Traditional Chinese: 許其鳳
- Simplified Chinese: 许其凤
Transcriptions
Standard Mandarin
- Hanyu Pinyin: Xǔ Qífèng

Xu Qifeng (Chinese: 许其凤; pinyin: Xǔ Qífèng; 5 January 1936 – 2 July 2020) was a Chinese engineer specializing in satellite navigation. He was an academician of the Chinese Academy of Engineering (CAE).

== Biography ==
Xu was born in Tianjin, on January 5, 1936. In September 1953, he was accepted to PLA Institute of Surveying and Mapping, where he majored in surveying. After graduation, he taught at the university. He died of illness on July 2, 2020.

== Works ==
- GPS导航与精密定位 [GPS Navigation and Precise Positioning] (in Chinese). Beijing: Jiefang Press. 1989. ISBN 7-5065-0855-9.

== Honours and awards ==
- 1996 State Science and Technology Progress Award
- 2005 Member of the Chinese Academy of Engineering (CAE)
- 2006 State Science and Technology Progress Award
