= Gerardo Juraci Campelo Leite =

Brazilian politician (1931–2020)

Juraci Leite

Member of the Legislative Assembly of Piauí
- In office 1983–1991
- In office 1995–2015

President of the Legislative Assembly of Piauí
- In office 1995–1999
- Preceded by: Robert de Almendra Freitas
- Succeeded by: Kléber Eulálio

Personal details
- Born: September 24, 1931 Pedro II, Piauí, Brazil
- Died: July 13, 2020 (aged 88) Teresina, Piauí, Brazil
- Party: Social Democratic Party (PSD)
- Other political affiliations: DEM (former)
- Education: Federal University of Ceará
- Profession: Politician, dentist, professor

Gerardo Juraci Campelo Leite (24 September 1931 – 13 July 2020), better known simply as Juraci Leite, was a Brazilian politician, dentist and professor from the state of Piauí.

== Life and career ==
Before pursuing a career in politics, Leite went to Federal University of Ceará and graduated as a Dentist. He worked as professor at both Federal University of Piauí and Federal Institute of Piauí.

In 1982, Leite was elected Member of the Legislative Assembly of Piauí. His first term went from 1983 to 1987.

In 1986 he was re-elected State Deputy for Piauí. This time he kept the position between 1987 and 1991.

In 1994, he was again elected State Deputy. His third tenure lasted from 1995 to 1999.

Between 1995 and 1999, Leite was elected by his peers and took office as President of the Legislative Assembly of Piauí.

In 1998, he was again re-elected State Deputy. He remained in power from 1999 to 2003.

In 2002, he was elected State Deputy for the third consecutive time. His fifth term lasted between the years of 2003 and 2007.

In 2006, Leite was re-elected State Deputy. He remained in office from 2007 to 2011.

In 2010, he was elected for his seventh and last term as a State Deputy. His final term went from 2011 to 2015.

In 2014, Leite had decided to run for his eighth term at the Legislative Assembly of Piauí but decided to withdraw his candidacy due to health issues.

== Personal life and death ==
Leite was married to Jandira Lopes Campelo and had four sons.

On 13 July 2020, Leite died in Teresina at the age of 88 due to complications brought on by COVID-19 during the COVID-19 pandemic in Brazil.
