= Ken Felton =

English footballer (1949–2020)

Personal information
- Full name: Kenneth Carl Felton
- Date of birth: 18 February 1949
- Place of birth: Blackhall, England
- Date of death: 9 July 2020 (aged 71)
- Place of death: Gloversville, New York, United States
- Position: Full back

Youth career
- 196?–1967: Darlington

Senior career*
Years	Team	Apps	(Gls)
1967–1970	Darlington	52	(8)
–	South Shields		
- * Club domestic league appearances and goals

Kenneth Carl Felton (18 February 1949 – 9 July 2020) was an English footballer who made 52 appearances in the Football League playing as a full back for Darlington in the late 1960s. He also played non-league football for South Shields. He played for Durham Schools under-15 team in the 1964–65 season.
