= Eldon A. Money =

American politician (1930–2020)

Member of the Utah Senate from the 17th district
- In office 1980–1997

Member of the Utah House of Representatives
- In office 1974–1979

Personal details
- Born: November 7, 1930 Spanish Fork, Utah, United States
- Died: July 8, 2020 (aged 89) Mapleton, Utah
- Party: Democratic
- Spouse: Sharlene Money
- Education: Utah State University
- Profession: farmer, cattleman

Eldon Anderson Money (November 7, 1930 – July 8, 2020) was an American politician who was a Democratic member of the Utah House of Representatives and Utah State Senate. An alumnus of Utah State University, he was a farmer and cattleman. Money served in the Utah National Guard for thirteen years. As of 2014, he is the last Democrat elected in Utah County, Utah to public office since he was defeated for re-election to the senate in 1996.

He died of Alzheimer's disease on July 8, 2020, in Mapleton, Utah at age 89.
