= Sylvia Gale =

American politician

Member of the New Hampshire House of Representatives
- In office 2012–2014
- Constituency: Hillsborough 28

Personal details
- Born: 1950
- Died: July 18, 2020 (aged 70)
- Party: Democratic

Sylvia Elizabeth Gale (1950 – July 18, 2020) was an American activist and politician from New Hampshire who served in the New Hampshire House of Representatives.

Gale was vice president of the NAACP in Greater Nashua. Gale endorsed the Bernie Sanders 2020 presidential campaign.

In July 2020, Gale died from cancer aged 70.
