= Song Jinsheng =

Chinese politician (1932–2020)

- 宋金升

Vice-Chairman of the Chinese Peasants' and Workers' Democratic Party
- In office December 1992 – December 2007
- Chairman: Lu Jiaxi; Jiang Zhenghua

Personal details
- Born: December 1932 Jing County, Hebei, China
- Died: July 6, 2020 (aged 87) Beijing, China
- Party: Chinese Communist Party; Chinese Peasants' and Workers' Democratic Party
- Education: Southwest Jiaotong University

Song Jinsheng (Chinese: 宋金升; pinyin: Sòng Jīnshēng; December 1932 - 6 July 2020) was a Chinese politician who served as vice-chairman of the Chinese Peasants' and Workers' Democratic Party.

== Biography ==
Song Jinsheng was born in December 1932 in Jing County, Hebei. He joined the Chinese Communist Party in 1948 and joined the Chinese Peasants' and Workers' Democratic Party in 1953. In 1953 he was accepted to Tangshan Railway Institute (now Southwest Jiaotong University). After graduating in 1958, he worked at the university. In 1965, he worked in Shijiazhuang, capital of north China's Hebei province. In 1984, he was transferred to Taiyuan, capital of Shanxi province, and was assigned to Taiyuan Institute for Training Transport Managerial Personnel. In 1992, he was transferred to Beijing and appointed vice-chairman of the Chinese Peasants' and Workers' Democratic Party. He was a member of the 8th and 9th National Committee of the Chinese People's Political Consultative Conference and a member of the 10th Standing Committee of the Chinese People's Political Consultative Conference. On July 6, 2020, he died of illness in Beijing, aged 87.
