= Jean-Pierre Moumon =

French author (1947–2020)

- Born: 1947; Toulon, France
- Died: 1 July 2020 (aged 72–73)
- Occupation: Writer

Jean-Pierre Moumon (1947 – 1 July 2020) was a French writer, literary critic, and translator in the field of speculative fiction. He often published under the pseudonyms of Rémi Maure, Rémi-Maure, and Jean-Pierre Laigle.

== Works ==
=== Novels ===
- Ave Caesar Imperator ! (2008)
- Retour à Opar (2008)

=== Anthologies ===
- Dimension Antarès (2018)

Dimension Antarès 2 (2019)

=== Essays ===
- Planètes pilleuses et autres thématiques de la science-fiction (2013)
- L'Anti-Terre (2018)
