= Paolo Cabras =

Italian politician (1931–2020)

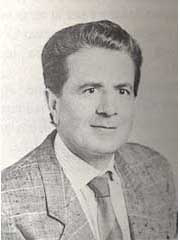

Senator of the Italian Republic
- In office 2 July 1987 – 14 April 1994
- Constituency: Lazio, Italy

Member of Italian Chamber of Deputies
- In office 25 May 1972 – 1 July 1987
- Constituency: Rome

Personal details
- Born: 16 January 1931 Rome, Italy
- Died: 2 July 2020 (aged 89)
- Party: Christian Democracy
- Profession: Surgeon, editor

Paolo Cabras (16 January 1931 – 2 July 2020) was an Italian politician and surgeon.

== Biography ==
Cabras was born in Rome on 16 January 1931. Prior to entering politics he earned a degree in medicine and surgery.

Cabras would enter politics as a member of the Christian Democracy (DC). In 1972 he entered politics as a founder of the Sunia, the National Tenants and Assignees Union. He was first elected to the Chamber of Deputies in 1972 and remained there until 1987 when he was elected to the Italian Senate, where he sat until 1994.

During his second term in the Senate, during Legislature XI, he would serve as a Vice-president of the parliamentary Antimafia Commission. While on this commission, he would highlight the dangers of the Camorra to local institutions.

From 1986 to 1989 he would also serve as an editor for the DC newspaper Il Popolo.

He died on 2 July 2020.
