= P. D. G. Thomas =

Welsh historian (1930–2020)

Peter David Garner Thomas ( 1 May 1930 - 7 July 2020) was a Welsh historian specialising in 18th-century British and American politics.

Thomas was born in Bangor, Wales, and educated at the University College of North Wales and University College London.

His first work, The House of Commons in the Eighteenth Century, explained the practices and procedures of the House of Commons of Great Britain, such as the debates, committees and attendance of its Members. J. M. Beattie, in his review, said that the two main strengths of the book were the detailed examination of the work and procedures of the Commons and "that it is not a static picture: we are constantly made aware of change and development".

He wrote 24 biographies for the Oxford Dictionary of National Biography.

== Works ==
- The House of Commons in the Eighteenth Century (Oxford: Oxford University Press, 1971).
- British Politics and the Stamp Act Crisis: The First Phase of the American Revolution, 1763–1767 (Oxford: Oxford University Press, 1975).
- Lord North (London: Allen Lane, 1976).
- (editor, with R. C. Simmons) Proceedings and Debates of the British Parliaments Respecting North America, 1754–1783, six volumes, Kraus International (Millwood, NY), 1982–86.
- The English Satirical Print, 1600–1832: The American Revolution (Chadwyck-Healey, 1986).
- The Townshend Duties Crisis: The Second Phase of the American Revolution, 1767–1773 (Oxford: Oxford University Press, 1987).
- Tea Party to Independence: The Third Phase of the American Revolution, 1773–1776 (Oxford: Oxford University Press, 1991).
- Revolution in America: Britain and the Colonies, 1763-1776 (University of Wales Press, 1992).
- John Wilkes: A Friend to Liberty (Oxford: Oxford University Press, 1996).
- George III: King and Politicians 1760-1770 (Manchester: Manchester University Press, 2002).
