= Jean-Marc Gabaude =

French philosopher (1928–2020)

- Born: 15 May 1928; Graulhet, France
- Died: 24 July 2020 (aged 92); Toulouse, France
- Occupation: Philosopher

Jean-Marc Gabaude (15 May 1928 – 24 July 2020) was a French philosopher and professor.

== Biography ==
Gabaude was born in 1928 in Graulhet. He studied at the University of Toulouse, and earned his doctorate of letters in 1972.

Gabaude became Dean of the Faculty of Philosophy at the University of Toulouse-Jean Jaurès and President of the Société toulousaine de philosophie in 1991. He paid tribute to his good friend, Michel Clouscard, in October 2011.

Jean-Marc Gabaude died on 24 July 2020 in Toulouse at the age of 92.

== Publications ==
=== Books ===
- La psychologie contemporaine. Méthodes et applications sociales (1960)
- Le jeune Marx et le matérialisme antique (1970)
- Liberté et raison. La liberté cartésienne et sa réfraction chez Spinoza et chez Leibniz (1970, 1972, 1974)
- Philosophie de la scolarisation, des années 1880 aux années 1980 (1987)
- Un demi-siècle de philosophie en langue française, 1937-1990. Historique de l'Association des Sociétés de philosophie de langue française (ASPLF) (1990)
- Jean Jaurès philosophe (2000)
- La philosophie de la culture grecque (2005)
- Pour la philosophie grecque (2005)
- Raison et liberté (2005)

=== Articles ===
- "Descartes-Spinoza et le mouvement historique de la rationalité" (1977)
- "Penseurs hétérodoxes du Monde Hispanique. Préface de Pierre-Maxime Schuhl" (1977)
- "Alain Guy, Vivès ou l'Humanisme engagé. Présentation, choix de textes, biographie, bibliographie" (1977)
- "Pierre Magnard, Nature et histoire dans l'apologétique de Pascal" (1977)
- "Spinoza, la pratique et la politique" (1978)
- "Alexandre Kojève, Introduction à la lecture de Hegel" (1981)
- "Apogée spinoziste du rationalisme" (1989)
- "Cosmos économique" (2003)

=== Collections ===
- Les chemins de la raison. XXe siècle : la France à la recherche de sa pensée (1997)

=== Thesis Supervisions ===
- La philosophie de la paix de Jean Jaurès : de son développement et de son articulation en idée et en action (1990, Marie Bertin)
- Violence et société chez Spinoza (1991, Thérèse Bellè Wangué Sam)
