= Olga Blinova =

Russian linguist (1930–2020)

- Born: Olga Iosifovna Leytan; 7 November 1930; Tyazhinsky District, Kemerovo Oblast, Soviet Russia
- Died: 2 July 2020 (aged 89); Tomsk, Tomsk Oblast, Russia
- Occupation: Linguist

Olga Iosifovna Blinova (Russian: О́льга Ио́сифовна Блино́ва; née Leytan; 7 November 1930 – 2 July 2020) was a Soviet and Russian linguist.

The daughter of Iosif Ignatievich Leytan (1890-1970), deputy director of the Omskaya Pravda publishing house, and Filiziya (or Felitsata) Vikentyevna Leytan (née Ludzish; 1898-1979), Blinova had three brothers. She graduated from the Tomsk State University, where she later served as a professor of Philology. Blinova died in Tomsk on 2 July 2020, aged 89.

== Awards ==
- State Prize of the Russian Federation laureate
- Honoured Scientist of the Russian Federation
- Recipient of the Order of Honour (Russia)
