= Florence Littauer =

American writer (1928–2020)

- Born: Florence Chapman; April 27, 1928
- Died: July 11, 2020 (aged 92)
- Occupations: Author, speaker
- Spouse: Fred Littauer (1953–2002; his death)
- Children: 5
- Writing career
- Notable work: Personality Plus

Florence Littauer (née Chapman; April 27, 1928 – July 11, 2020) was an American Christian self-help author and public speaker. Littauer is best known for her series of books based upon the Personality Plus personality system. She was listed as one of Helen K. Hosier's "100 Christian Women Who Changed the Twentieth Century" and has received the National Speakers Association's Council of Peers Award for Excellence and has been designated by them as a Certified Speaking Professional.

== Background ==
The daughter of Walter and Katie F. Chapman, she grew up in her father's store in Haverhill, Massachusetts, sharing three rooms with her family. She attended the University of Massachusetts Amherst on a scholarship, where she earned a Bachelor's degree in English with a minor in psychiatry.

She met her future husband, Fred Littauer (died 2002), at a Jewish day camp for girls, with the two becoming engaged about a year later. The wedding was covered by Life Goes to a Wedding and the two had five children together. Their third child, Fred Jr "Freddie", died from issues related to seizures he suffered during his infancy and their fourth child, Larry (deceased), suffered from a brain disorder and was institutionalized. During this time Littauer suffered depression, which continued until she met Roy Gustafson, a member of the Billy Graham Evangelistic Team.

From this meeting Littauer and her husband began a ministry, a public speaking business, and a series of religious themed books. The Littauers adopted their final child, a boy, following Freddie's death. In October 2002, Fred died of a heart attack at their home while Littauer was away on a speaking engagement. Behind the Personality: The Story of My Life was in its final editing stages at that time and Littauer inserted a tribute to her late husband in the final chapter of the book.

== Personality Plus ==
=== Personality groups ===
- Powerful Cholerics are considered to be leader and commander types, being dominant, strong, decisive, and occasionally arrogant. They tend to be good leaders because they are driven to get things done, however they might offend some people along the way. Cholerics are also known as the "Powerful" type.
- Perfect Melancholy personality types are described by Littauer to be the mental types, with their personality displaying a strong emphasis on thinking, evaluation, and assessment. Their typical behavior involves thinking, assessing, making lists, evaluating the positives and negatives, and general analysis of facts. They love maps, charts and graphs. They are usually the most intelligent of the four types, however they tend to dwell on details. A Melancholy is a planner, making sure things happen, although sometimes they can paralyze themselves with over-analysis. Lists and "doing things the right way" are characteristics of this personality type. Melancholies are also known as the "Perfect" type.
- Popular Sanguines are a social personality type, displaying characteristics such as a predisposition to socialize and entertain. They enjoy fun, socializing, chatting, telling stories - and are fond of promising the world, because that is the friendly thing to do. A Sanguine gets on well with people and can get others excited about issues, but cannot always be relied upon to get things done. They love interacting with others and play the role of the entertainer or center of attention in group interactions. They have a tendency to over-promise and under-deliver. Sanguines are also known as the "Popular" type.
- Peaceful Phlegmatics are described as having a flat-type personality, being laid back and desiring a peaceful environment above all else. They are easy going, laid back, nonchalant, unexcitable and relaxed. Desiring a quiet and peaceful environment above all else. They tend not to actively upset people, but their indifference may frustrate people. They try not to make decisions, and generally go for the status quo. They are good as mediators because they do not usually have many enemies. They also have a "dry" and quick sense of humor. Phlegmatics are also known as the "Peaceful" type.

None of these types is specifically described as being positive or negative - hence the combination of positive and negative adjectives (i.e. "Powerful" with "Choleric"). They each have upsides and downsides. The characteristics are for observing and identifying, rather than judging.

== Bibliography ==
- Blow Away the Black Clouds (1979)
- Personality Plus (1983)
- Your Personality Tree (1986)
- The Best of Florence Littauer (1989)
- Silver Boxes: The Gift of Encouragement (1989)
- Dare to Dream (1991)
- Silver Linings: Breaking through the Clouds of Depression (1994)
- The Gift of Encouraging Words (1996)
- Personality Plus for Parents: Understanding What Makes Your Child Tick (2000)
- A Letter is a Gift Forever: The Charm and Tradition of a Handwritten Note (2001)
- It Takes So Little to Be Above Average (2001)
- Personality Plus for Couples: Understanding Yourself and the One You Love (2001)
- Setting the Stage for Your Child's Faith (2002)
- Behind the Personality: The Story of My Life (2003)
- Your Personality Tree (2005)
- How to Get Along with Difficult People (2006)
- Communication Plus: How to Speak So People Will Listen (2006)
- Personality Plus at Work: How to Work Successfully with Anyone (2011)

Co-wrote with husband, Fred Littauer

- After Every Wedding Comes a Marriage (1997)
