= Esparbec =

French pornographic author (1933–2020)

- Born: Georges Pailler; 1933
- Died: 6 July 2020 (aged 86–87)
- Other names: John Jensen, Victoria Queen, Georges Péridol
- Occupation: Author

Georges Pailler (12 March 1933 – 6 July 2020), known by the pen name Esparbec, was a French pornographic author.

== Biography ==
Esparbec wrote over 100 novels with Media 1000 as his publisher, and 11 pornographic novels with La Musardine. He used other pen names such as John Jensen, Victoria Queen, and Georges Péridol. He was considered by Jean-Jacques Pauvert and Georges Wolinski the greatest French pornographic writer.

== Select bibliography ==
- La Veuve et l'Orphelin (The Widow and the Orphan) (1995)
- Monsieur dresse sa bonne (The Gentleman Dresses Up His Maid) (1996)
- Le Pornographe et ses modèles (The Pornographer and His Models) (1998)
- La Pharmacienne (The Pharmacist Woman) (2003)
- La Foire aux cochons (The Pig Fair) (2003)
- Les Mains baladeuses (The Wandering Hands) (2004)
- Amour et Popotin (Love and Butts) (2005)
- Le Goût du Péché (The Taste of Sin) (2006)
- Monsieur est servi (The Gentleman is Served) (2007)
- La Jument (The Mare) (2008)
- Le Bâton et la Carotte (The Stick and the Carrot) (2009)
- Frotti-Frotta (Bump and Grind) (2011)
- Les Biscuitières (The Buscuiteers) (2014)
- Le Fruit défendu (The Forbidden Fruit) (2015)
- La Débauche (The Debauchery) (2017)
- L'Esclave de Monsieur Solal (The Slave of Monsieur Solal) (2018)
- La Culotte (The Panties) (2019)
