= Jacques Mazoin =

French rugby player (1929–2020)

- Born: 1929
- Died: 11 July 2020 (aged 90–91)

Rugby union career
Youth career
- ?–?: US Dax
Senior career
Years	Team	Apps	(Points)
1952–1954	Paris Université Club		
?–?	US Dax		
Coaching career
- Years: Team
- 1974–1977: US Dax

Jacques Mazoin (1929 – 11 July 2020) was a French rugby union player and coach.

== Biography ==
Born in 1929, Mazoin played for US Dax during his youth career. He won the Coupe Frantz-Reichel championship in 1949.

He studied at the École normale d'éducation physique before playing with Paris Université Club from 1952 to 1954. He returned to US Dax to play professionally before retiring. He started working as a physical education teacher at the Lycée Borda in Dax.

Mazoin continued to work for the US Dax organization, working as a physical trainer from 1964 to 1973 before becoming head coach. He left his coaching position in 1977.

Jacques Mazoin died on 11 July 2020 at the age of 91.
