= Ray Matheny =

American anthropologist (1925–2020)

Personal details
- Born: Ray T. Matheny; 15 February 1925 Los Angeles, California, U.S.
- Died: 1 July 2020 (aged 95)
- Children: 4
- Education: Brigham Young University (BA)
- Occupation: Professor

Military service
- Allegiance: United States
- Branch/service: United States Air Corps
- Battles/wars: World War II; Korean War

Ray T. Matheny (15 February 1925 – 1 July 2020) was a professor of anthropology at Brigham Young University (BYU).

== Biography ==
Matheny was born in Los Angeles, California. Matheny was in the United States Air Corps during World War II. He was shot down while flying over Germany in January 1944, and spent over a year as a prisoner at Stalag 17-B near Krems, Austria. After the war he was a mechanic for Western Air Lines and then joined the military again to serve in the Korean War. By the time he began his studies at BYU he was a 32-year-old freshman with a wife and four children.

He earned his BA and master's degrees at Brigham Young University in 1960 and 1962, and a PhD degree in anthropology from the University of Oregon in 1968. He was involved in many archaeological expeditions to Mayan cities. He was closely connected with the New World Archaeology Foundation.

Matheny was also involved in archaeological studies of the Southwestern United States, Utah, Great Basin, and Bronze Age Israel. He directed archaeology field schools in Montezuma Canyon and Nine Mile Canyon, Utah. He edited a volume on the rock art of the inter-mountain region of the United States.

In 2002 the government of Campeche recognized Matheny for his contributions to Mayan archeology.

Matheny was also closely connected with the establishment of the BYU Field School in Southern Utah. The University of Utah press published a collection of essays in his honor, written by colleges, many his former students, which focused heavily on south-west US and Meso-American archeology.

Matheny was an active member of the Church of Jesus Christ of Latter-day Saints.
