= Frank Guilford =

American politician (1928–2020)

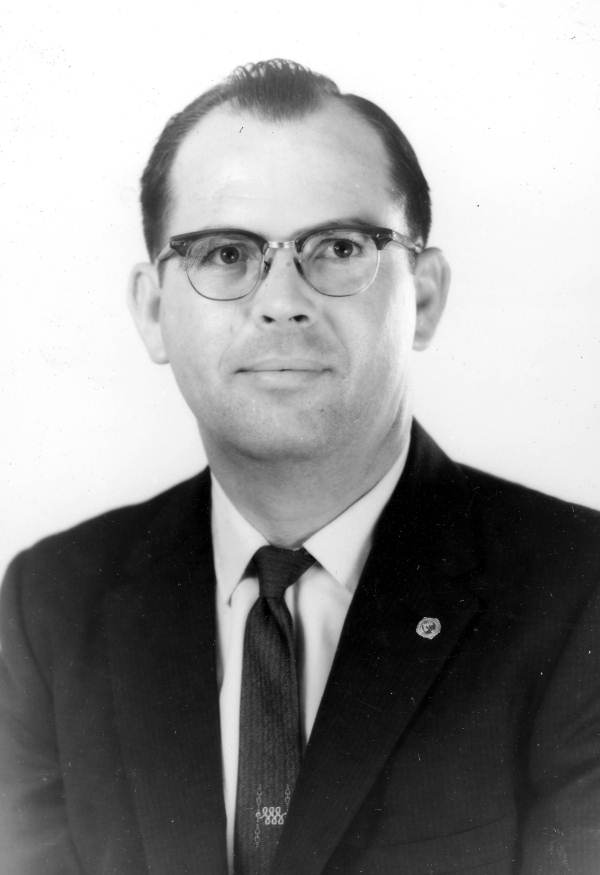

Member of the Florida House of Representatives from the Calhoun County district
- In office November 1962 – 1966

Personal details
- Born: July 1, 1928 Dothan, Alabama, United States
- Died: July 27, 2020 (aged 92) Blountstown, Florida, United States
- Party: Democratic
- Education: Florida State University
- Occupation: educator

Frank Edwin Guilford (July 1, 1928 – July 27, 2020) was a politician in the American state of Florida. He served in the Florida House of Representatives from 1962 to 1966, representing Calhoun County.
