= Pierre Breteche =

French sailor (1928–2020)

Pierre Breteche (2 July 1928 – 1 July 2020) was a French sailor who competed in the 1968 Summer Olympics. He was born in Nantes and died there in 2020.
