= John Greatrex =

English cricketer and footballer (1936–2020)

Personal information
- Full name: Edward John Greatrex
- Date of birth: 18 November 1936
- Place of birth: Nuneaton, England
- Date of death: 22 July 2020 (aged 83)
- Position: Goalkeeper

Youth career
- Norwich City

Senior career*
Years	Team	Apps	(Gls)
1954–1958	Norwich City	2	(0)
1959	Cambridge City		(0)
	Chelmsford City		(0)
	Clacton Town		(0)
	Bury Town		(0)
	Great Yarmouth		(0)
- * Club domestic league appearances and goals

Edward John Greatrex (18 November 1936 – 22 July 2020) was an English cricketer and footballer. He was a right-handed batsman and wicket-keeper who played for Norfolk. He was born in Nuneaton.

Greatrex, who represented Norfolk in the Minor Counties Championship for seventeen seasons, made a single List A appearance for the team, during the 1970 Gillette Cup. He scored 12 runs with the bat.

Greatrex also played football as a goalkeeper for Norwich City, Cambridge City, Chelmsford City, Clacton Town, Bury Town and Great Yarmouth Town. Greatrex made one Football League appearance for Norwich. Greatrex died on 22 July 2020 at the age of 83.
