= Wang Jiafan =

Chinese historian (1938–2020)

- 王家范
- Born: September 22, 1938; Kunshan, Jiangsu, China
- Died: July 7, 2020 (aged 81); Huashan Hospital, Shanghai, China
- Occupations: Historian, professor

Academic background
- Education: East China Normal University

Academic work
- Discipline: History
- Sub-discipline: Economic and Social History of China; Jiangnan Regional History
- Institutions: East China Normal University

Wang Jiafan (Chinese: 王家范; pinyin: Wáng Jiāfàn; September 22, 1938 – July 7, 2020) was a Chinese historian specializing in economic and social history of China and Jiangnan regional history. He was a professor and doctoral supervisor at East China Normal University.

== Biography ==
Wang Jiafan was born in the town of Chenmu (now Jinxi), Kunshan, Jiangsu, on September 22, 1938. He attended Chenmu Central Primary School. He elementary studied at Chenmu Middle School and secondary studied at Kunshan High School. In 1957 he was accepted to East China Normal University, where he majored in history. After graduation, he taught at the university. He was promoted to associate professor in 1986 and to full professor in 1992. In 2012, he was employed as a librarian of Shanghai Literature and History Research Museum. On July 7, 2020, he died at Huashan Hospital, in Shanghai, aged 81.

== Works ==
- 当代学术：中国历史通论 [General Theory of Chinese History] (in Chinese). Beijing: SDX Joint Publishing Company. 2019. ISBN 9787108064776.
- 史家与史学 [Historians and Historiography] (in Chinese). Beijing: Beijing Normal University Press. 2019. ISBN 9787303244768.
- 明清江南史从稿 [History of Jiangnan in Ming and Qing Dynasties] (in Chinese). Beijing: SDX Joint Publishing Company. 2018. ISBN 9787108060709.
- 百年颠沛与千年往复 (in Chinese). Shanghai: Shanghai People's Publishing House. 2018. ISBN 9787208137516.
- 漂泊航程：历史长河中的明清之旅 [Wandering Voyage: the Journey of Ming and Qing Dynasties in the Long History] (in Chinese). Beijing: Beijing Normal University Press. 2013. ISBN 9787303157938.
- 明清江南社会史散论 [On the Social History of Jiangnan in Ming and Qing Dynasties] (in Chinese). Shanghai: Shanghai People's Publishing House. 2019. ISBN 9787208156067.
- 明清江南史研究三十年 [Thirty Years of Research on Jiangnan History in Ming and Qing Dynasties] (in Chinese). Shanghai: Shanghai Classics Publishing House. 2010. ISBN 9787532555604.
- Fan Jinshi; Zhang Liwen; Deng Weizhi; Wang Jiafan (2019). 一个人的四十年：共和国学人回忆录 [A Man's Forty Years: Memoirs of the Scholars of the People's Republic of China] (in Chinese). Beijing: SDX Joint Publishing Company. ISBN 9787108065735.
- Wang Jiafan; Zahng Genghua; Chen Jiang (2000). 大学中国史 [History of China] (in Chinese). Beijing: Higher Education Press. ISBN 9787040233247.
