= Joseph Vidal =

French politician (1933–2020)

General Councillor of the Canton of La Malpère à la Montagne Noire
- In office 1970–2008

Regional Councillor of Languedoc-Roussillon
- In office 1978–1988

Member of the French National Assembly for Aude
- In office 19 March 1978 – 1 April 1993

Personal details
- Born: 5 March 1933 Lavalette, France
- Died: 9 July 2020 (aged 87)

Joseph Vidal (5 March 1933 – 9 July 2020) was a French politician. In 2002, he became a Knight of the Legion of Honour.
