= Tereza Costa Rêgo =

Brazilian painter (1929–2020)

- Born: 28 April 1929; Recife
- Died: 26 July 2020 (aged 91); Recife
- Occupation: painter
- Awards: Ordem do Mérito Cultural

Tereza Costa Rêgo (28 April 1929 – 26 July 2020) was a Brazilian painter. She received the Ordem do Mérito Cultural in 2011.

Rêgo was born in April 1929 and was noted for her painting ability at a young age, with her piece "Menina e ex-votos" being placed into the Museu do Estado de Pernambuco in 1949. She continued to win more award from the State Museum and the Recife Society of Modern Art, having three by 1962.

Costa Rêgo died in Recife on 26 July 2020, aged 91, due to a stroke.
