= Willie McGrotty =

Scottish footballer (1952–2020)

Personal information
- Full name: William McGrotty
- Date of birth: 12 August 1952
- Place of birth: Glasgow, Scotland
- Date of death: 3 July 2020 (aged 67)
- Position: Winger

Youth career
- Yoker Athletic

Senior career*
Years	Team	Apps	(Gls)
1970–1973	Blackpool	4	(1)
1973	Western Suburbs		
1974	Safeway United	22	(7)
Total		26	(8)
- * Club domestic league appearances and goals

William McGrotty (12 August 1952 – 3 July 2020) was a Scottish professional footballer who played as a winger.

== Career ==
Born in Glasgow, McGrotty played for Yoker Athletic, Blackpool, Western Suburbs and Safeway United.

McGrotty died on 3 July 2020, aged 67.
