= David Bobihoe Akib =

Indonesian politician (1955–2020)

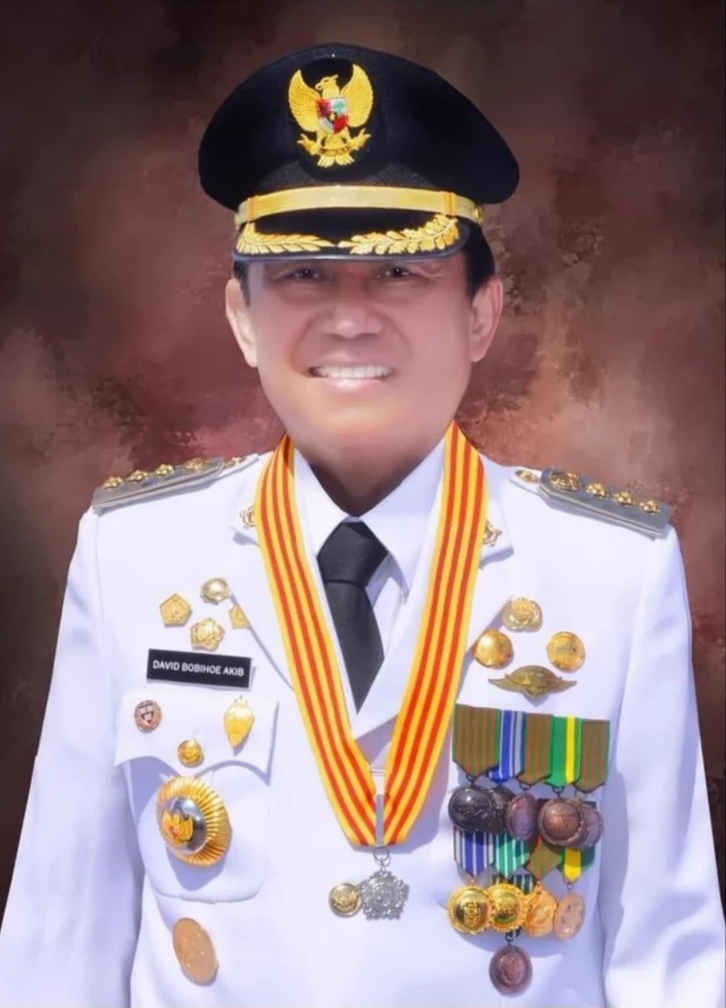

Regent of Gorontalo
- In office 2005–2015
- Governor: Fadel Muhammad; Gusnar Ismail; Rusli Habibie
- Vice Governor: Sofyan Puhi (2005–2010); Tonny S. Junus (2010–2015)
- Preceded by: Ahmad Hoesa Pakaya
- Succeeded by: Nurlan Darise (acting)

Personal details
- Born: October 30, 1955 Limboto, present-day Gorontalo Regency, present-day Gorontalo
- Died: July 16, 2020 (aged 64) Gorontalo city, Gorontalo, Indonesia
- Party: Golkar (2005–2018); NasDem Party (2018–2020)
- Spouse: Rahmijati Jahja
- Children: Jhon Frederik Reverid; Jenifer Rivian Lestyorini

David Bobihoe Akib (October 30, 1955 – July 16, 2020) was an Indonesian civil servant, public relations practitioner, and politician. He served as the Regent of Gorontalo Regency, in Gorontalo province, for two consecutive terms from 2005 until 2010. (His first term in office was from 2005 until 2010, while his second term as regent lasted from 2010 to 2015).

Bobihoe joined the North Sulawesi provincial civil service in 1976. He later joined the public relations office of North Sulawesi province (which Gorontalo was part of until 2000). Two years later, he became head of the Gorontalo District Public Relations office as well. He then led the Gorontalo City Tourism Office. He finally became head of the North Sulawesi Province Public Relations Bureau from 1997 until 2001.

Bobihoe's civil service and tourism careers led him to politics. He initially served as Gorontalo Regency Regional Secretary from 2001 until 2005. In 2005, Bobihoe was elected Regent of Gorontalo Regency. Bobihoe served two consecutive terms as regent from 2005 to 2010 and again from 2010 until 2015. He was also an unsuccessful candidate for Governor of Gorontalo province in 2011.

In 2015, Bobihoe ran for Vice Governor of North Sulawesi province as the running mate of North Sulawesi gubernatorial candidate, Benny Mamoto. However, the Mamoto-Bobihoe ticket, who were members of the Golkar party, lost the 2015 state gubernatorial election.

David Bobihoe Akib died while undergoing medical treatment at Aloei Saboe Hospital in Gorontalo city on July 16, 2020. He was 64 years old. He was survived by his wife, Rahmijati Jahja, a member of the national Regional Representative Council, and their two children, Jhon Reverid Bobihoe and Jheniver Rivian Bobihoe.
