= Anna Simková =

Slovak actress (1931–2020)

- Born: 28 February 1931; Medzilaborce
- Died: 28 July 2020 (aged 89)
- Occupation: actress

Anna Simková (28 February 1931 – 28 July 2020) was a Slovak stage actress.

She was born in Medzilaborce. She played at the Ukrainian National Theater in Prešov from 1946. She also worked for the Alexander Duchnovič Theatre. She retired in 1991.

Simková died on 28 July 2020, aged 89.
