= Steve dePyssler =

American Air Force officer (1919–2020)

- Born: July 21, 1919; Chicago, Illinois, U.S.
- Died: July 25, 2020 (aged 101); Bossier City, Louisiana, U.S.
- Military career
- Allegiance: United States of America
- Branch: United States Army Air Forces; United States Air Force
- Service years: 1941–1979
- Rank: Colonel
- Conflicts: World War II; Korean War; First Indochina War; Bay of Pigs invasion; Vietnam War; Dominican Civil War
- Awards: Legion of Merit (4)

Steven Leroy dePyssler (July 21, 1919 – July 25, 2020) was an officer of the United States Air Force.

== Life ==
He was the only American known to have participated in six military engagements: World War II, Korean War, First Indochina War, Bay of Pigs Invasion, Vietnam War and the Dominican Civil War. He died from COVID-19 on July 25, 2020, four days after his 101st birthday during the COVID-19 pandemic in Louisiana.
