= Ena Thomas =

Welsh cook (1935–2020)

- Born: 5 June 1935; Felindre, Wales
- Died: 5 July 2020 (aged 85); Carmarthen, Wales
- Occupation: chef

Ena Thomas (5 June 1935 – 5 July 2020) was a Welsh television chef. She came from Carmarthenshire, and was known as the chef on the 1990s Welsh-language television programme Heno (Tonight).

She published a number of Welsh-language cookery books, including Coginio Cartref Ena (Ena's Home Cooking) (1999) and Blas ar Fywyd (Taste of Life) (2012).

Thomas died on 5 July 2020, aged 85.
