= Marcel Plasman =

Belgian politician (1924–2020)

Mayor of Nivelles
- In office 1977 – 2 May 1983
- Preceded by: Alfred Scokaert
- Succeeded by: Lucien Glibert

Secretary of Social Affairs
- In office 7 March 1977 – 3 June 1977
- Preceded by: Robert Moreau
- Succeeded by: Alfred Califice

Minister of Pensions
- In office 7 March 1977 – 3 June 1977
- Preceded by: Robert Moreau
- Succeeded by: Jos Wijninckx

Member of the Chamber of Representatives
- In office 9 March 1971 – 2 January 1979
- Preceded by: Lucien Glibert
- Succeeded by: Maurice Dehu

Personal details
- Born: 23 December 1924 Braine-l'Alleud, Belgium
- Died: 28 July 2020 (aged 95)
- Party: PSC

Marcel Plasman (23 December 1924 – 28 July 2020) was a Belgian politician.

== Biography ==
Plasman began his career as an employee of the Federation of Christian Mutualites. He also served as President of the Fédération nationale des associations médico-sociales from 1972 to 1973 and again from 1985 to 1987. He was President of the Association chrétienne des Invalides et Handicapés from 1975 to 1985 and President of the Confédération des Institutions hospitalières from 1974 to 1976 and 1984 to 1986.

Plasman was a member of the Centre démocrate humaniste (PSC) party and was elected to the communal council of Nivelles in 1964, serving until 1996. From 1977 to 1982 and from 1989 to 1995, he served as Mayor.

From 1971 to 1979, Plasman served in the Chamber of Representatives, representing the arrondissement of Nivelles. He left the Chamber in 1979 and was succeeded by Raymond Langendries. In 1977, he was appointed Minister of Pensions and Secretary of Social Affairs under the second government of Leo Tindemans.

Marcel Plasman died of pneumonia on 28 July 2020 at the age of 95.
