= Lamine Bechichi =

Algerian politician (1927–2020)

Lamine Bechichi (19 December 1927 – 23 July 2020) was the Algerian minister for communications in the 1995 government of Mokdad Sifi.

Born in the village of sedrata near Souk Ahras in 1927 under the name of Ahcene Bechichi, who became Lamine Bechichi later.

His Father, Cheikh Bekacem AL-Loudjani, was a spiritual and religious man, one of the founders of the Association of Algerian Muslim Ulema and the first imam of the mosque of sedrata who was established by him as well.

After a few years of studying with his father, Lamine was sent to AL-Zaytuna Mosque in Tunisia to pursue his education.

He quickly turns his interest in arts and music as he was initiated to Classical Violin by his Teacher Nicola Bonura
