= Günter-Helge Strickstrack =

German politician (1921–2020)

Günter-Helge Strickstrack (28 May 1921 – 20 July 2020) was a German politician who was a founding member of the CDU which was created in 1950.

During the Second World War, Strickstrack worked as a journalist and was a prominent member of the Junge Union Deutschlands.
