= Denise Domenach-Lallich =

French resistance member (1924–2020)

- Born: Denise Domenach; 10 October 1924; Lyon, France
- Died: 19 July 2020 (aged 95)
- Occupation: Professor
- Known for: French Resistance (Resistance Medal, Legion of Honour)
- Spouse: Bernard Lallich (19??-1991; his death)

Denise Domenach-Lallich (10 October 1924 – 19 July 2020) was a member of the French Resistance during World War II.

== Biography ==
Domenach-Lallich was the third child in a family of nine children. Her father was an engineer with a local cable company and her brother, Jean-Marie Domenach, was also a resistance fighter. The Domenach family was Roman Catholic and part of the social Catholicism movement. Domenach-Lallich was a student in Lyon when the war broke out.

Denise Domenach went to live with her maternal grandparents in Bourg-en-Bresse before moving back to Lyon. Jean-Marie joined the resistance with his friend, Gilbert Dru. Denise joined the Resistance in 1940. In October 1943, she entered the "Faculté des Lettres" in Lyon and was part of the Jeunes chrétiens combattants (JCC). In May 1944, she was appointed as leader of the Mouvements Unis de la Résistance. Wanted by the Gestapo, she went into hiding in Hauterives. After the Liberation of Paris, she was a part of the Mouvements de libération nationale. At the same time, she met Bernard Lallich, who was awarded the Croix de Guerre for his wartime service. They married in 1946. She finished school and became a professor of literature. She eventually published her notebooks documenting her Resistance experiences in 1999.

Domenach-Lallich received the Resistance Medal and was a Knight of the Legion of Honour. An amphitheater at Collège La Tourette in Lyon was named in her honor. In 2018, the Centre d'histoire de la résistance et de la déportation in Lyon presented Génération 40, des jeunes dans la tourmente, which extracted transcripts from her diary.

== Family ==
Denise Domenach-Lallich died on 19 July 2020, aged 95. Her husband, Bernard Lallich, died of Alzheimer's disease on 28 October 1991. She co-founded the Rhône-Alzheimer association, and served as its Vice-President for 10 years. She published articles relating to old age.

== Publications ==
- Demain il fera beau journal d'une adolescente, novembre 1939-septembre 1944 (2001)
- Les lieux secrets de la Résistance – Lyon, 1940–1944 (2003)
- Une jeune fille libre : journal 1939–1944 (2005)
- Gardons l'espoir (2005)
- Grand âge, nous voici (2009)
