= Halldóra K. Thoroddsen =

Icelandic writer (1950–2020)

Halldóra K. Thoroddsen (1950 – 21 July 2020) was an Icelandic writer. She studied at the Iceland College of Education and the Iceland Academy of the Arts. She worked extensively in education, print and broadcast media. As a writer, she published in a number of genres including poetry, short stories, microfiction and novels. Her novel Tvöfalt gler (Double Glazing) won the Icelandic Women's Literature Prize (Fjöruverðlaunin) in 2016 and the EU Prize for Literature in 2017.

She lived in Reykjavík.

== Selected works ==
- Hárfínar athugasemdir (poetry, 1998)
- 90 sýni úr minni mínu (microfiction, 2002)
- Gangandi vegfarandi (poetry, 2005)
- Aukaverkanir (short stories, 2006)
- Tvöfalt gler (novel, 2016)
- Orðsendingar (poetry, 2017)
- Katrínarsaga (novel, 2018)
