= Ayo Fasanmi =

Nigerian pharmacist and politician (1925–2020)

- Born: 27 September 1925 present Ekiti State, Nigeria
- Died: 29 July 2020 (aged 94)
- Citizenship: Nigerian
- Occupations: politician pharmacist
- Years active: 1978–2020

Ayorinde Fasanmi // (27 September 1925 – 29 July 2020) was a Nigerian pharmacist and politician.

== Early life ==
He was born in 1925 at Iye Ekiti, a local government area of Ekiti State, southwestern Nigeria. He attended St Paul's primary school, Ebutte Metta and Government School, Ibadan before he proceeded to the Pharmacy School of Yaba where he received a diploma certificate in pharmacy. He practiced as a pharmacist at Oshogbo briefly before he joined Nigerian politics.

== Political career ==
He joined the Unity Party of Nigeria in 1978 and was a candidate in the Ondo State gubernatorial primary election but lost to Michael Adekunle Ajasin, the former governor of Ondo State. In 1983, he was elected member of the Federal House of Representatives representing Ondo North. He later served as member of the Board of Directors of the Old Western Nigeria Housing Corporation. During the Fourth Nigerian Republic, he served as the National Vice Chairman of the Alliance for Democracy, Southwest zone.

== Personal life ==
He was married to the late Madam Adejoke who died at the age of 82 years in October 2014.
