= Jean Boin =

French footballer (1949–2020)

Personal information
- Date of birth: 15 May 1949
- Place of birth: Barlin, France
- Date of death: 25 July 2020 (aged 71)
- Height: 1.70 m (5 ft 7 in)
- Position: Defender

Senior career*
Years	Team	Apps	(Gls)
1967–1969	Lens	46	(2)
1969–1973	Reims		
1973–1977	Hazebrouck		
1977–1982	Saint-Omer		
Total		215	(14)

Managerial career
- 1982–1985: Bruay-la-Buissière
- * Club domestic league appearances and goals

Jean Boin (15 May 1949 – 25 July 2020) was a French professional football player and coach who played as a defender.

== Career ==
Born in Barlin, Boin played for Lens, Reims, Hazebrouck and Saint-Omer. He then managed Bruay-la-Buissière.

He died on 25 July 2020.
