= Karl Heinrich Kaufhold =

German economic historian (1932–2020)

- Born: 29 August 1932; Hildesheim, Weimar Republic
- Died: 16 July 2020 (aged 87)
- Occupation: Historian

Karl Heinrich Kaufhold (29 August 1932 – 16 July 2020) was a German economic historian. He worked for the University of Göttingen.

== Works ==
- Das Handwerk der Stadt Hildesheim im 18. Jahrhundert. Eine wirtschaftsgeschichtliche Studie (1968)
- Das Metallgewerbe der Grafschaft Mark im 18. und frühen 19. Jahrhundert (1976)
- Das Gewerbe in Preußen um 1800 (1978)
- Bergbau und Hüttenwesen in und am Harz (1991)
- Mittelalter und frühe Neuzeit (1997)
- Historische Statistik der preußischen Provinz Ostfriesland (1998)
- Europäische Montanregion Harz (2001)
- Preise im vor- und frühindustriellen Deutschland. Nahrungsmittel – Getränke – Gewürze – Rohstoffe und Gewerbeprodukte (2001)
- Die Wirtschafts- und Sozialgeschichte des Braunschweigischen Landes vom Mittelalter bis zur Gegenwart (2008)
