= Ali Suleman Habib =

Pakistani businessman (1956–2020)

- Born: 1956
- Died: 17 April 2020 (aged 63–64)
- Education: Degree in Mechanical Engineering from the University of Minnesota and PMD Program at Harvard University
- Board member of: Chairman of Indus Motors Company (2009 - 2020), Founding chairman of Young Presidents Organisations (YPO), chairman of the Pakistan Business Council

Ali Suleman Habib (1956 – 17 April 2020) was a Pakistani businessman who served as chairman of Indus Motors Company from 2009 to 2020.

== Education ==
Habib graduated in mechanical engineering from the University of Minnesota and also attended the PMD Program at Harvard University.

== Career ==
He was one of the founding director of Indus Motors Company and was serving as its chairman since 2009. He was the founding chairman of the Pakistani chapter of Young Presidents' Organization (YPO). In May 2012, he was elected as chairman of the Pakistan Business Council, succeeding Asad Umar. He served as a member of the board of governors of the Shaukat Khanum Memorial Trust.

During his professional career, he served as a member of the board of directors of the companies under House of Habib such as Thal Limited, Shabbir Tiles & Ceramics Limited, Habib Metropolitan Bank, and Metro Cash & Carry Pakistan.

He also served as a member of the board of governors of Habib University.

He was noted as one of Pakistan's most prominent businessmen.

== Death ==
Habib was suffering from acute pancreatitis and was admitted to hospital in Karachi on 31 March 2020.

He died in Karachi of an undisclosed illness at the age of 63. According to some sources he died at the age of 64.

== See also ==
- House of Habib
- Habib University
