= Toyota Corolla (E100) =

Seventh generation of Toyota Corolla

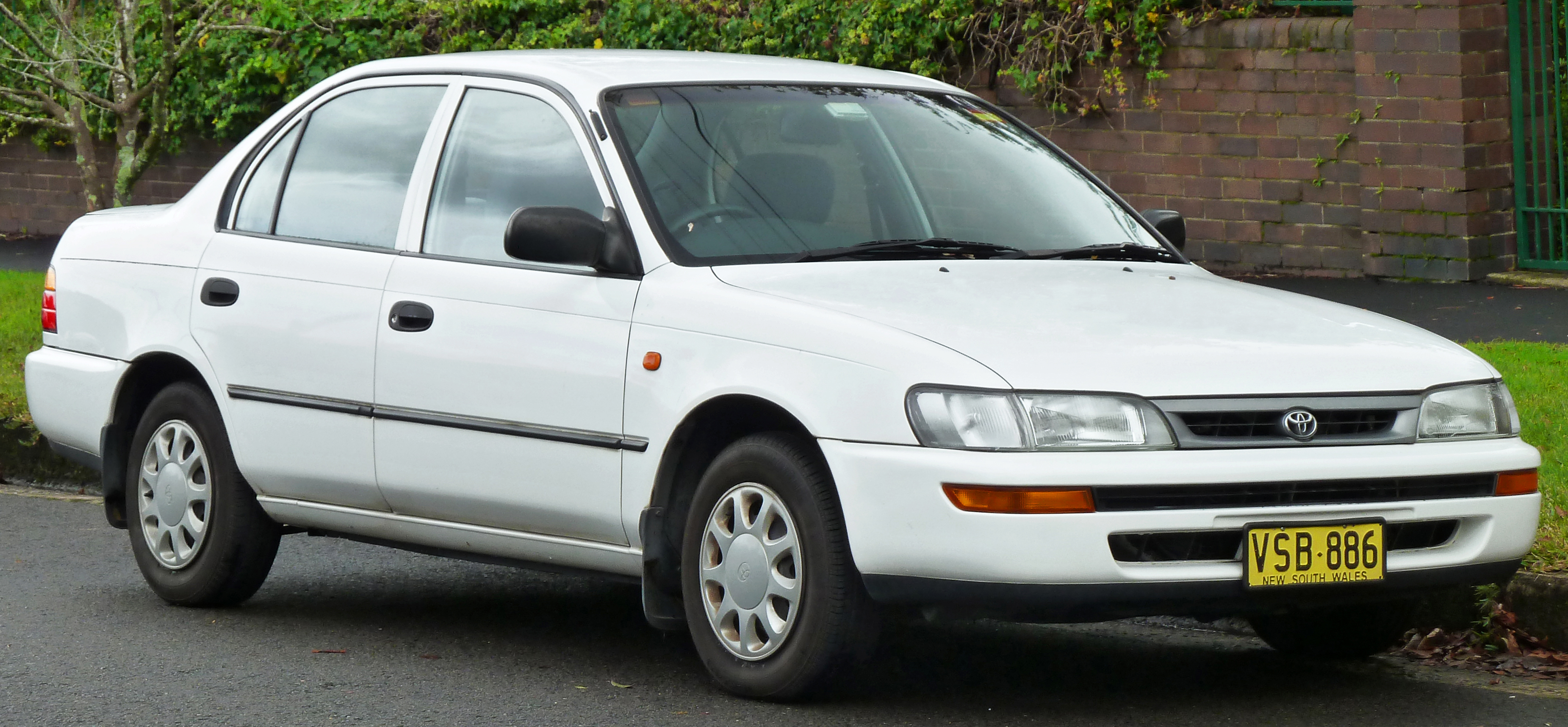

Overview
- Manufacturer: Toyota
- Model code: E100
- Production: June 1991–August 1998; July 1994–July 1999 (Australia); 1991–2002 (wagon/van)
- Model years: 1993–1997 (North America)
- Assembly: Japan: Toyota, Aichi; Canada: Cambridge, Ontario, (TMMC); United States: Fremont, California (NUMMI); Turkey: Adapazarı (TMMT); Australia: Altona (TMA); New Zealand: Thames (CKD); Taiwan: Zhongli (Kuozui Motors); Thailand: Samrong Tai (TMT); Indonesia: North Jakarta (Multi Astra); Malaysia: Shah Alam (UMW); Philippines: Parañaque (1992–1997); Santa Rosa (1997–1998), (TMP); Pakistan: Karachi (Toyota Indus); Vietnam: Vĩnh Phúc (Toyota Vietnam; SKD)

Body and chassis
- Body style: 4-door sedan; 3/5-door hatchback; 2-door coupé; 5-door liftback; 5-door station wagon/van
- Layout: Front-engine, front-wheel-drive
- Related: Toyota Sprinter (E100); Geo Prizm; Holden Nova

Powertrain
- Engine: Petrol: 1295 cc 2E I4; 1331 cc 4E-FE I4; 1452 cc 3E I4 (Van); 1496 cc 5E-FE I4 (Van); 1498 cc 5A-FE I4; 1587 cc 4A-FE/4A-GE I4; 1587 cc 4A-GZE SC I4; 1762 cc 7A-FE I4; Diesel: 1973 cc 2C I4; 2184 cc 3C-E I4
- Transmission: 4/5/6-speed manual; 3/4-speed automatic

Dimensions
- Wheelbase: 2,465 mm (97.0 in)
- Length: Hatchback: 4,095 mm (161.2 in); Wagon/Van: 4,260 mm (167.7 in); Sedan/Coupé: 4,275 mm (168.3 in)
- Width: 1,685 mm (66.3 in); Coupé: 1,695 mm (66.7 in)
- Height: Coupé: 1,305 mm (51.4 in); Sedan/Hatchback: 1,375 mm (54.1 in); Wagon/Van: 1,435 mm (56.5 in)
- Curb weight: 920–1,160 kg (2,028–2,557 lb)

Chronology
- Predecessor: Toyota Corolla (E90)
- Successor: Toyota Corolla (E110); Toyota Probox (van); Toyota Corolla Fielder (wagon; Japan)

The Corolla E100 is the seventh generation of cars sold by Toyota under the Corolla nameplate. This generation of Corolla is larger, heavier, and visually more aerodynamic than the model it replaced. With its 2,465 mm (97.0 in) wheelbase, the Corolla had moved into the compact size class once occupied by the Corona and Camry. The Corolla again had an equivalent model Sprinter, with the Sprinter Trueno being equivalent to the Corolla Levin and both exclusive to Toyota Vista Store Japanese dealerships.

== Design ==
The development of the seventh-generation Corolla was led by chief engineer Akihiko Saito. Not only was the wheelbase increased, but the new Corolla also received a wider track than did the 90-series. The solid design reflected the desire of development chief Dr. Akihiko Saito to make a 'mini-Lexus', to build on the success of Toyota's flagship range. The sedan and hatchback have drag coefficients of Cd=0.33, the liftback is Cd=0.30, and the wagon/van have Cd=0.36. The model used fewer body panels than the predecessor, for increased strength, lower cost, and fewer panel gaps (providing a cleaner appearance and lower wind resistance). The headlights were now from polycarbonate rather than glass, and almost 90 percent of the bodyshell was made from galvanized steel - compared to about 60 percent in the preceding generation.

== Japan ==
The standard Corolla model range included the three-door hatchback Corolla FX, four-door sedan and five-door station wagon (and light van) models. Also returning in this generation was the two-door coupé Corolla Levin. A 4WD variant of the sedan and station wagon was also available with a 1.6 litre petrol or 2.0 litre diesel engine.

The four-door "pillared hardtop" Corolla Ceres and Sprinter Marino were introduced in 1992. They bore no real exterior resemblance but feature the chassis and most of the engine range of the standard Corollas, and used the Levin/Trueno dashboard. Minor facelift changes were introduced in May 1993. These included a new grille, a reconfiguration of the rear lamps and various other bits of trim and garnish.

The E100 sedan and hatchbacks introduced in June 1991 lasted until the introduction of the E110 in May 1995, while the E100 wagons and the related van continued in the Japanese market alongside the newer Corolla and Sprinter Carib models. Passenger wagons were available in 'G-Touring', 'L-Touring' and high-performance 'BZ-Touring' guises, while "Van" and "Business Wagon" models were basically stripped out wagons with leaf-sprung solid axle rear suspensions. Business Wagons typically had slightly higher equipment levels than simpler vans; this model was renamed the Corolla Assista Wagon in 2000. Toyota also offered a High-Roof version of the Corolla (and Sprinter) Van. The Corolla Touring Wagon continued until 2000, while both commercial versions continued to serve the Japanese market until July 2002, long outliving the mainstream E110 models in Japan. The Corolla/Sprinter Van was succeeded by the Probox.

=== TRD2000 ===
In October 1994, Toyota Racing Development launched a special edition of the Corolla for the Japanese market, known as the TRD2000. These cars were based on the GT sedan and converted to replicate the 1994 Corolla JTCC race car specifications. The engine was swapped to a naturally-aspirated 2.0 L 3S-GE with 180 PS (132 kW), new 5-speed S54 manual gearbox, heavy duty clutch, mechanical LSD, quickshifter, 15-inch TRD Type-FT wheels with Yokohama Grandprix M5 tires, TRD brakes, new suspension (20 mm lower), small spoiler on the boot, stainless steel dual exhaust, König Prinz P200 bucket seats, TRD steering wheel and only available in white. Initially, 99 cars were planned to be built, but only 10 cars were sold because of the high price, costing more than the contemporary Celica GT-Four.

Engine
Engine	Power	Torque
1.3 L 2E inline-four (petrol)	73 PS (54 kW)	10.3 kg⋅m (101 N⋅m; 75 lb⋅ft)
1.3 L 4E-FE inline-four (petrol); Van	97 PS (71 kW); 94 PS (69 kW)	11.5 kg⋅m (113 N⋅m; 83 lb⋅ft); 11.3 kg⋅m (111 N⋅m; 82 lb⋅ft)
1.5 L 3E inline-four (petrol) - Van, 09/91-01/94	79 PS (58 kW)	12.0 kg⋅m (118 N⋅m; 87 lb⋅ft)
1.5 L 5E-FE inline-four (petrol) - Van/Business Wagon, 01/94-04/98; 04/98-08/00; 08/00-06/02	97 PS (71 kW); 91 PS (67 kW); 89 PS (65 kW)	12.7 kg⋅m (125 N⋅m; 92 lb⋅ft); 13.2 kg⋅m (129 N⋅m; 95 lb⋅ft); 13.0 kg⋅m (127 N⋅m; 94 lb⋅ft)
1.5 L 5A-FE inline-four (petrol) after May 1995	105 PS (77 kW); 100 PS (74 kW)	13.8 kg⋅m (135 N⋅m; 100 lb⋅ft); 14.0 kg⋅m (137 N⋅m; 101 lb⋅ft)
1.6 L 4A-FE inline-four (petrol) some late models	115 PS (85 kW); 110 PS (81 kW)	15.0 kg⋅m (147 N⋅m; 108 lb⋅ft); 15.2 kg⋅m (149 N⋅m; 110 lb⋅ft)
1.6 L 4A-GE (20-Valve) inline-four (petrol); BZ Touring (02/96-08/00)	160 PS (118 kW); 165 PS (121 kW)	16.5 kg⋅m (162 N⋅m; 119 lb⋅ft)
1.6 L 4A-GZE inline-four (petrol)	170 PS (125 kW)	21.0 kg⋅m (206 N⋅m; 152 lb⋅ft)
2.0 L 2C inline-four (diesel); Van	73 PS (54 kW)	13.5 kg⋅m (132 N⋅m; 98 lb⋅ft); 13.2 kg⋅m (129 N⋅m; 95 lb⋅ft)
2.2 L 3C-E inline-four (diesel)	79 PS (58 kW)	15.0 kg⋅m (147 N⋅m; 108 lb⋅ft)

=== Gallery ===
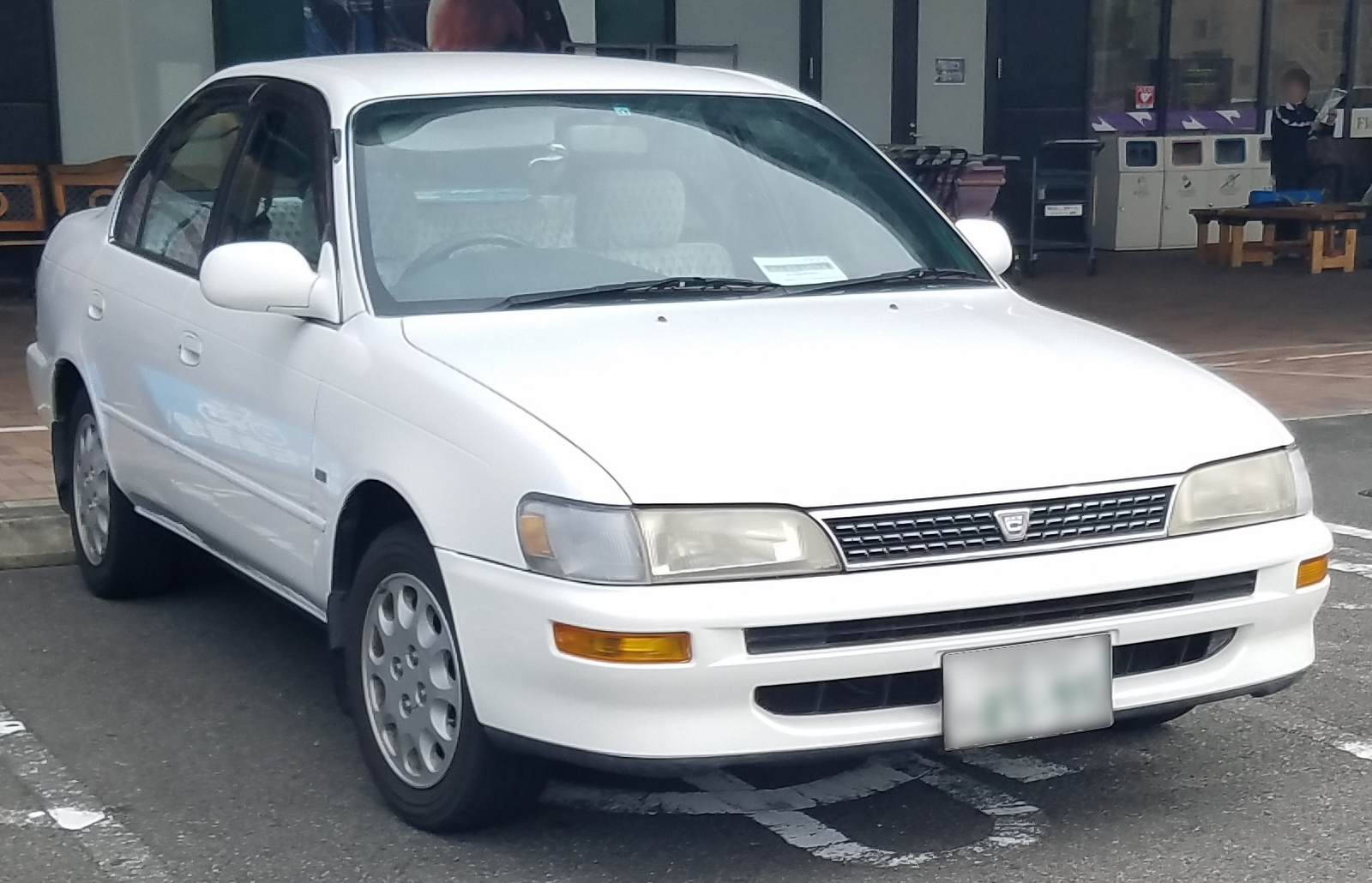
Toyota Corolla LX Limited Saloon

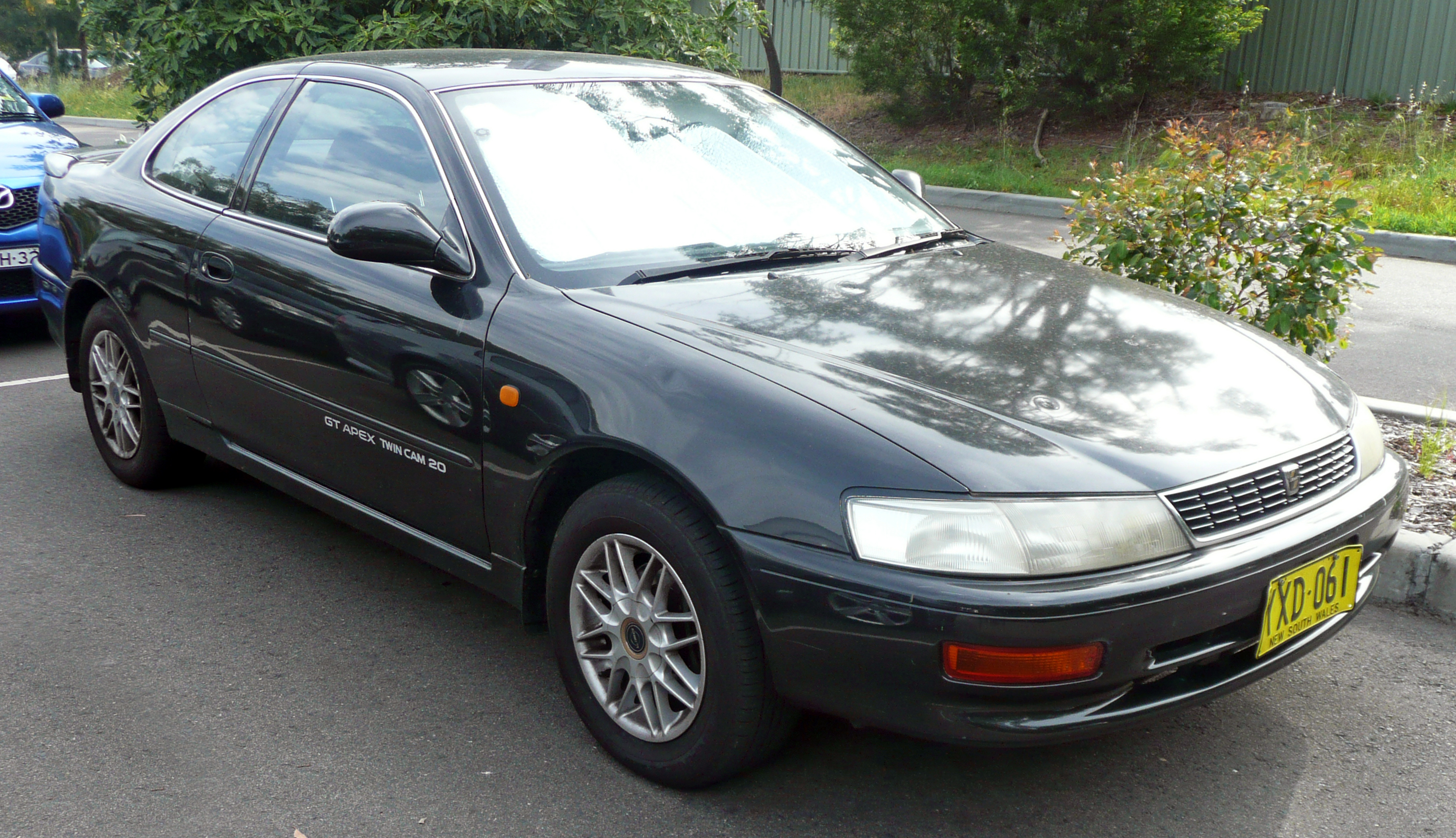
Toyota Corolla Levin GT APEX (AE101)

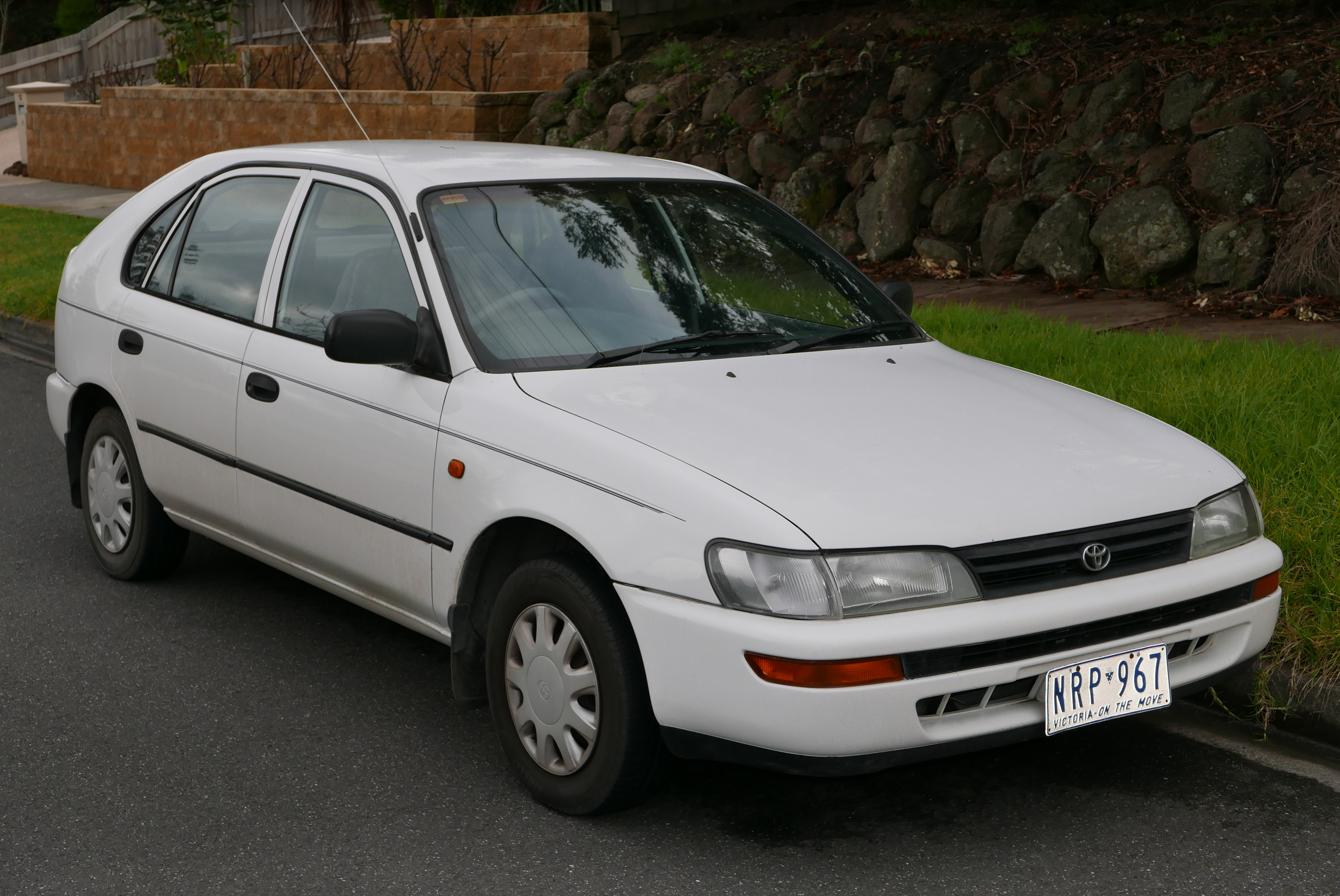
1996 Toyota Corolla hatchback (AE101R)

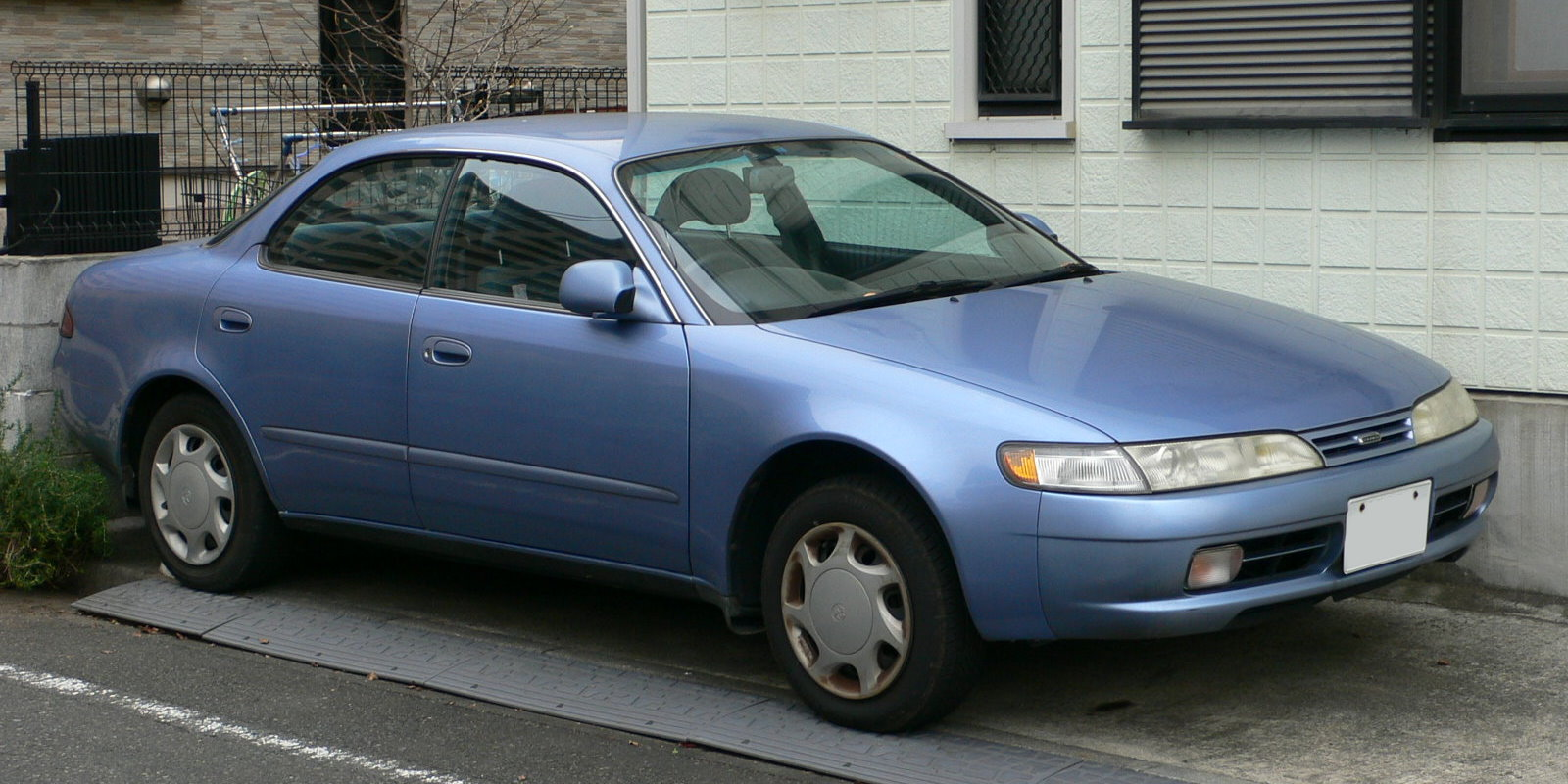
Toyota Corolla Ceres

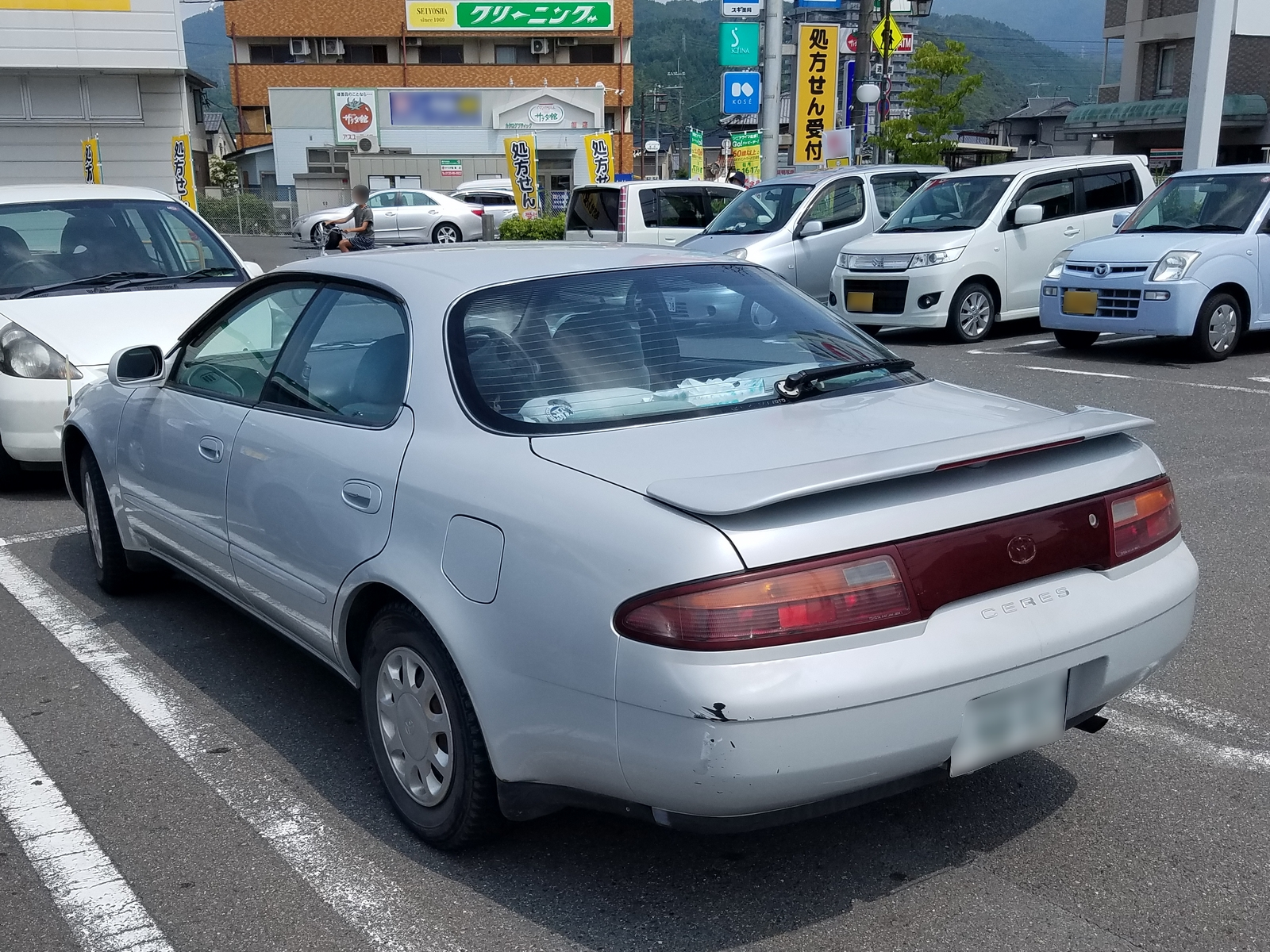
Toyota Corolla Ceres (rear view)

Wagon

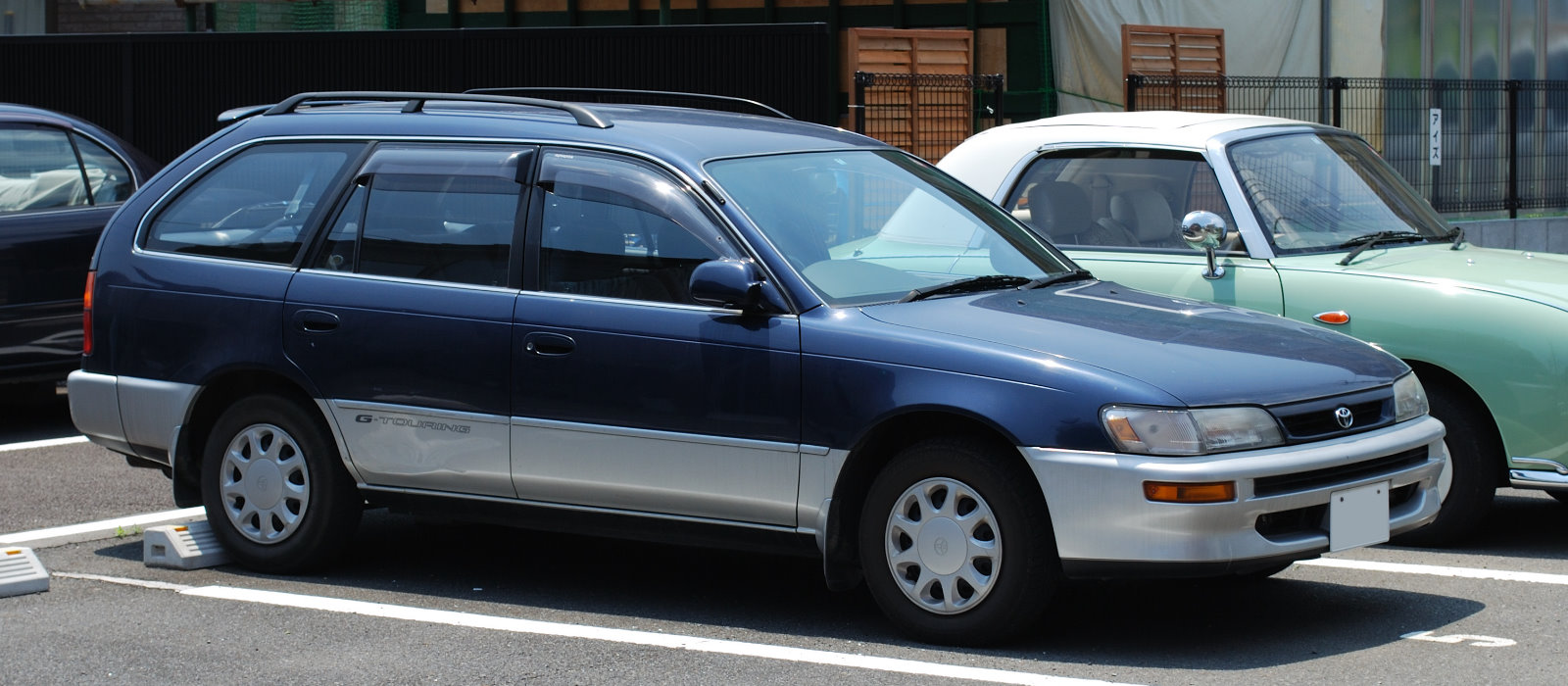
1991–1997 Toyota Corolla Wagon

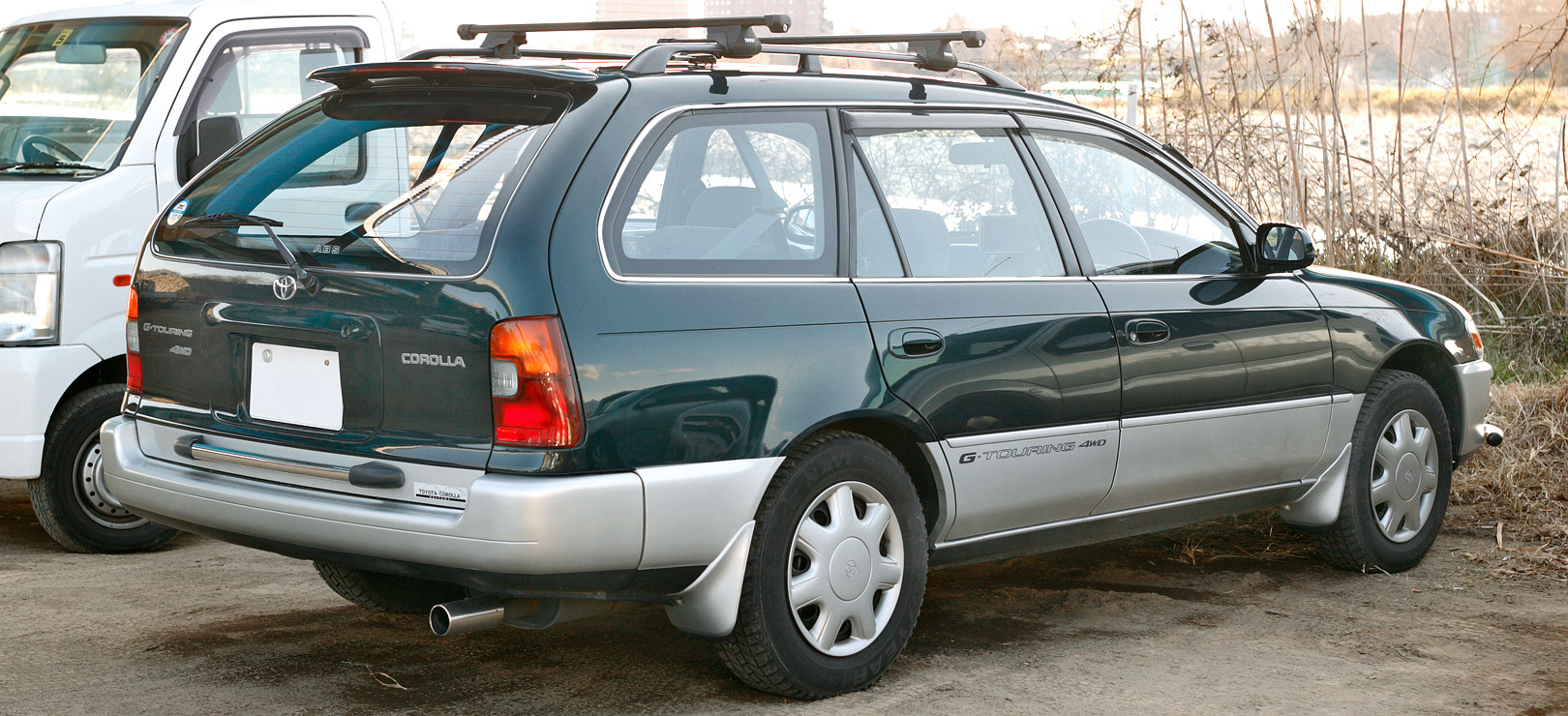
1991–1997 Toyota Corolla G Touring Wagon (rear view)

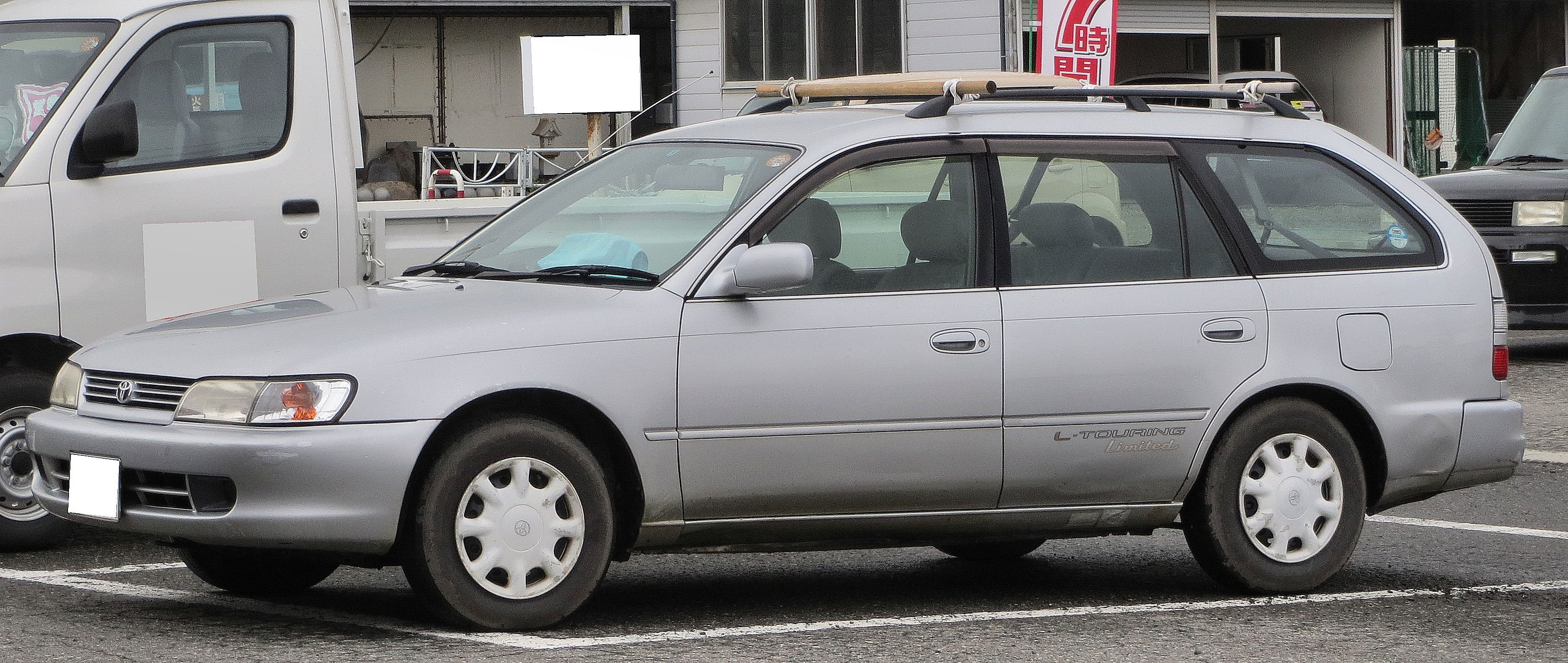
1997–2000 Toyota Corolla L-Touring Wagon

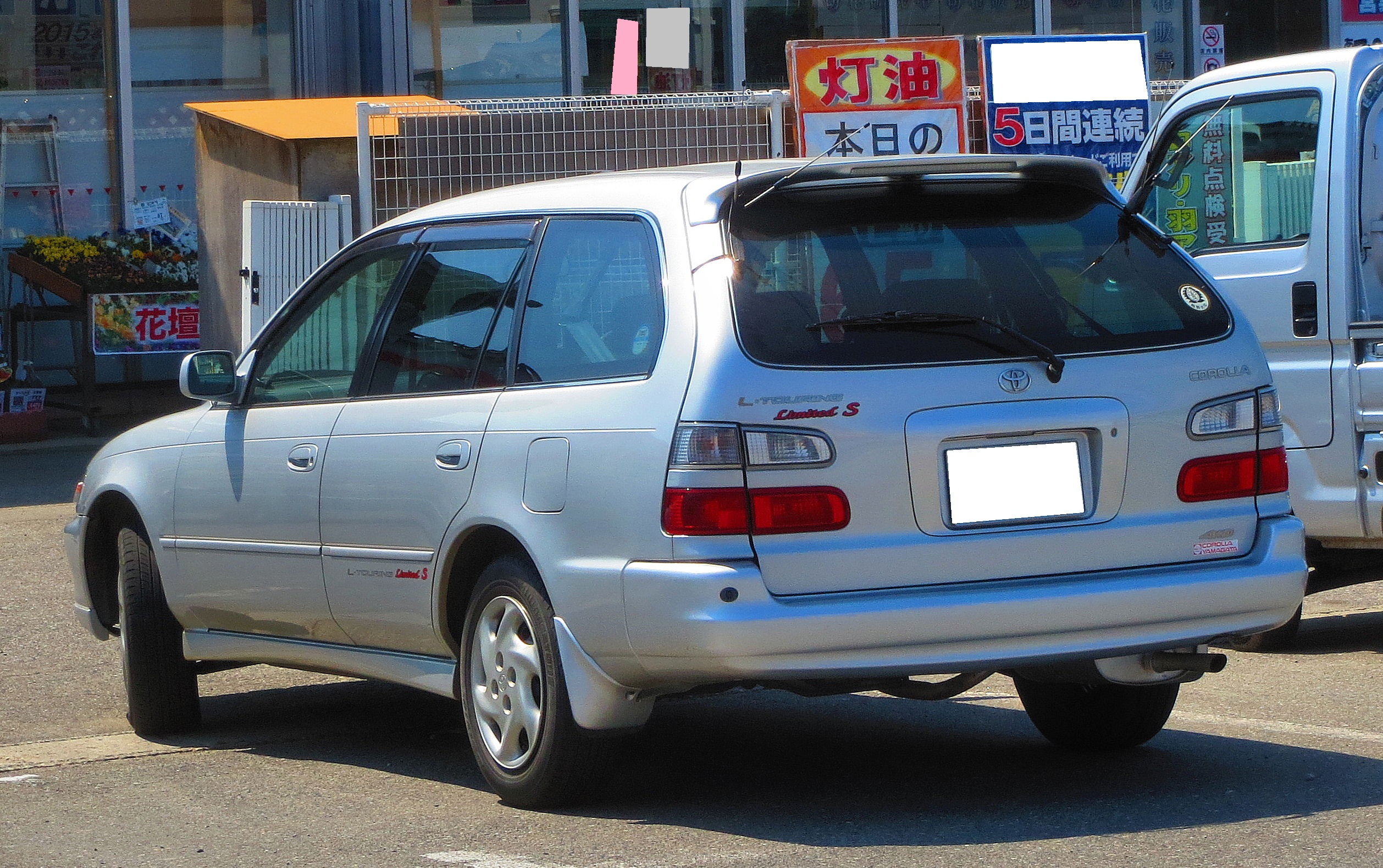
1997–2000 Toyota Corolla L-Touring Wagon (rear view)

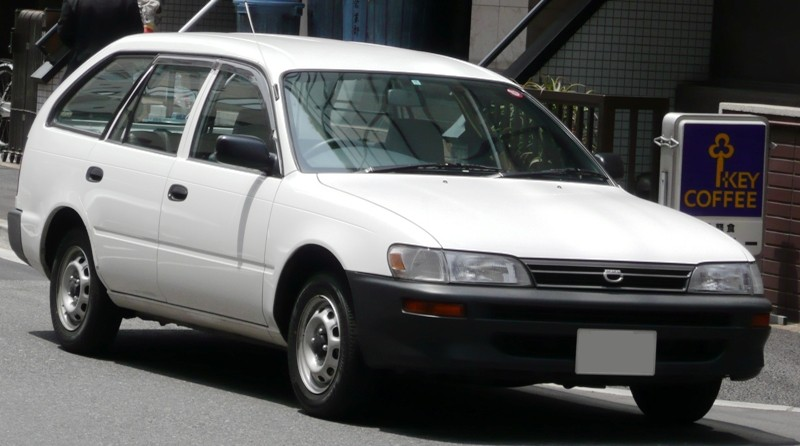
1991–2002 Toyota Corolla Van

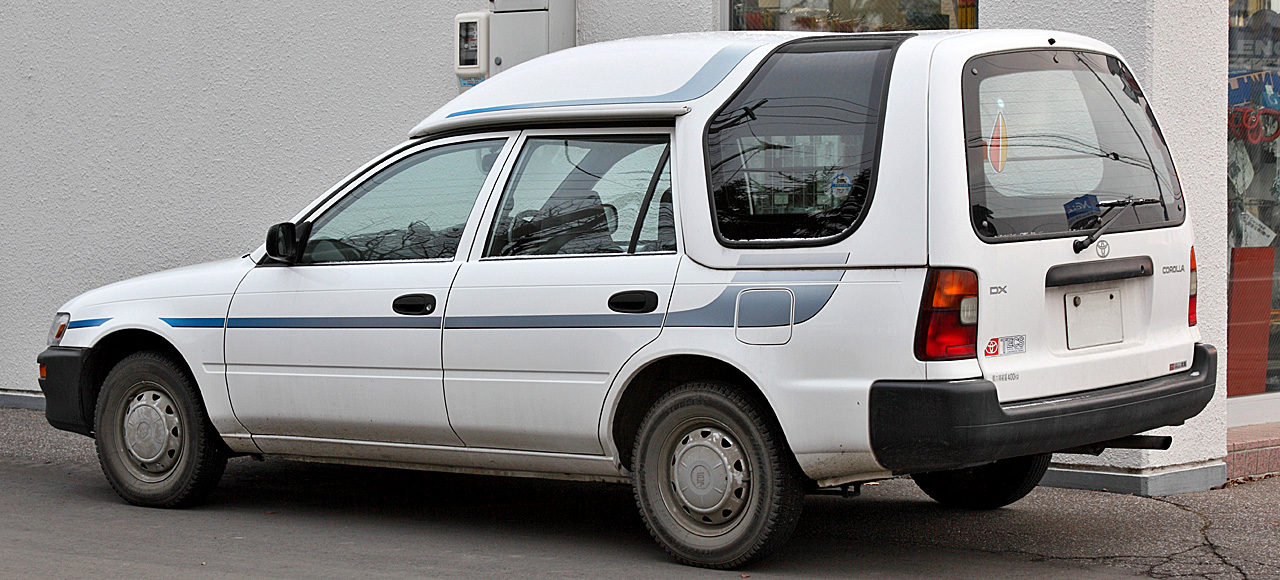
Toyota Corolla Highroof Van

=== Powertrains ===
Japanese market manual transaxles:

- C140 4M/T
- C50 5M/T
- C51 5M/T
- C52 5M/T
- C56 5M/T
- C160 6M/T
- S50 5M/T
- E59F 5M/T
- E55F 5M/T (4WD)

Japanese market automatic transaxles:

- A240L 4A/T
- A245E 4A/T
- A246E 4A/T
- A241L 4A/T
- A132L 3A/T
- A241H 4A/T (4WD)

Japanese market chassis: The following list is not complete or inclusive:

- EE101 — 1.3L 4E-FE sedan, hatchback (DX, LX, XE)
- EE102V — 1.3L 4E-FE van
- EE103V — 1.5L 5E-FE van
- EE104G — 1.5L 5E-FE business wagon
- EE106V — 1.3L 2E van
- EE107V — 1.5L 3E van
- EE108G — 1.5L 3E business wagon
- AE100, G — 1.5L 5A-FE sedan (DX, LX, XE, SE-Limited), coupé (Levin S), and Wagon (L-Touring, G-Touring)
- AE101, G — 1.6L sedan (SE-G, GT), FX hatchback (SJ, GT), Wagon (BZ-Touring), hardtop Ceres, and coupé (Levin SJ, GT, GT APEX, GT-Z)
- AE104, G — 1.6L sedan 4WD (LX Limited, XE, SE Limited) and Touring Wagon 4WD
- AE109V — 1.6L van 4WD
- CE100, G — 2.0L diesel sedan and Touring Wagon
- CE101G — 2.2L diesel Touring Wagon
- CE102G — 2.2L diesel business wagon
- CE104 — 2.0L diesel sedan 4WD
- CE105V — 2.2L diesel van 4WD
- CE106V — 2.0L diesel van
- CE107V — 2.2L diesel van
- CE108G — 2.0L diesel business wagon
- CE109V — 2.0L diesel van 4WD

== Asia ==
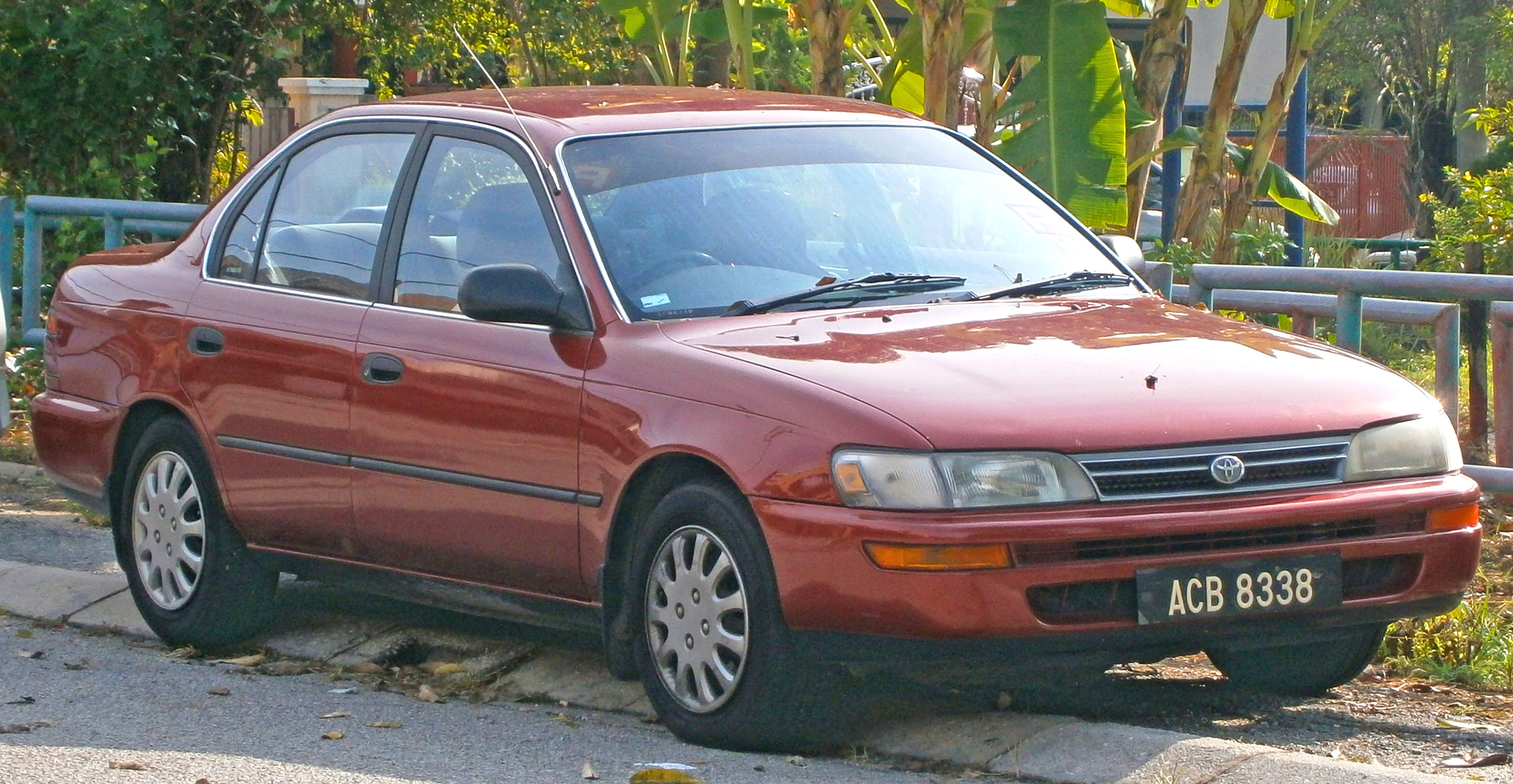
Toyota Corolla (Malaysia; pre-facelift look 1992–1993 same as with other Asian countries)

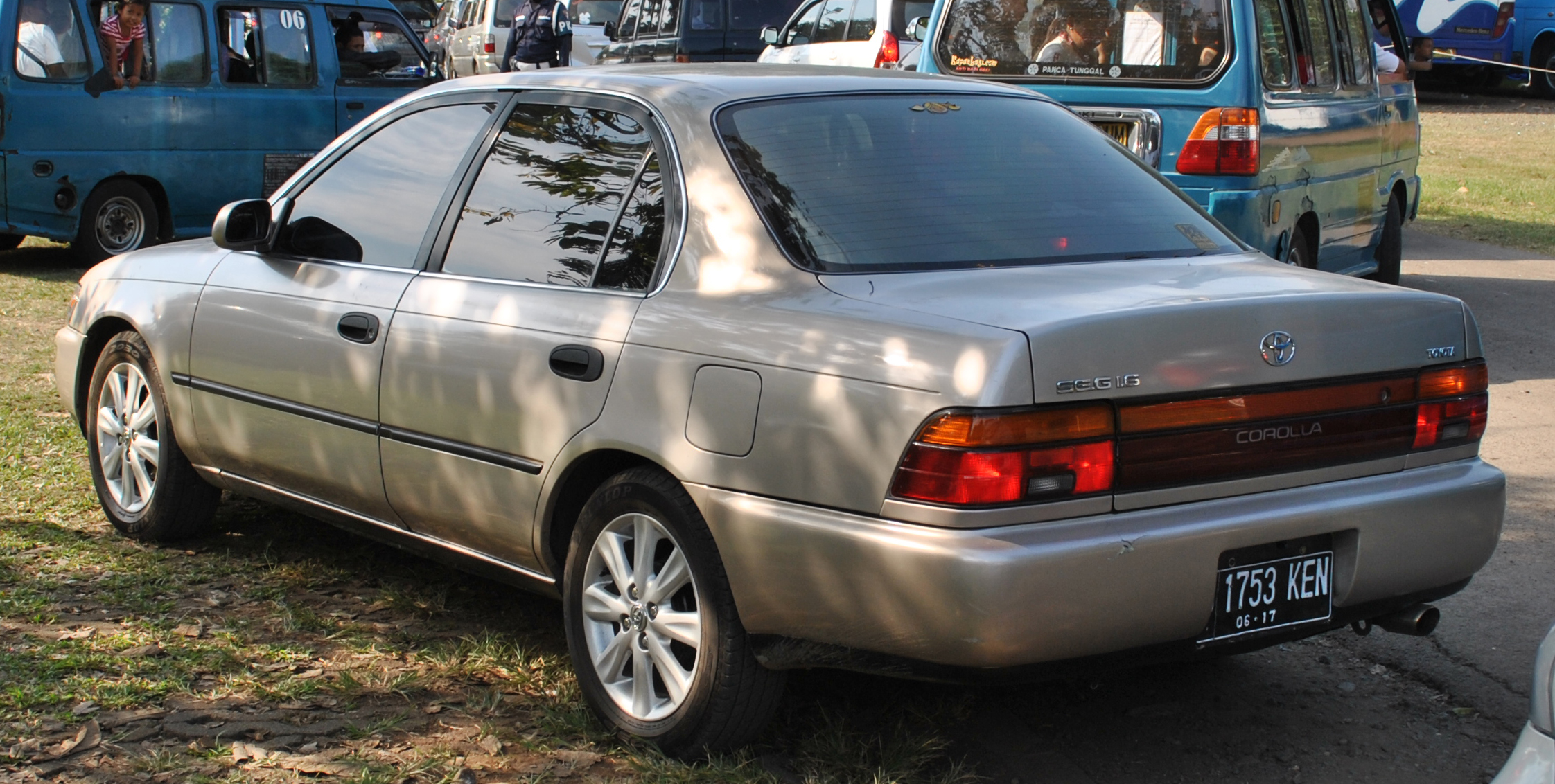
Toyota Great Corolla 1.6 SE-G (Indonesia; pre-facelift look 1992–1993 same as with other Asian countries)

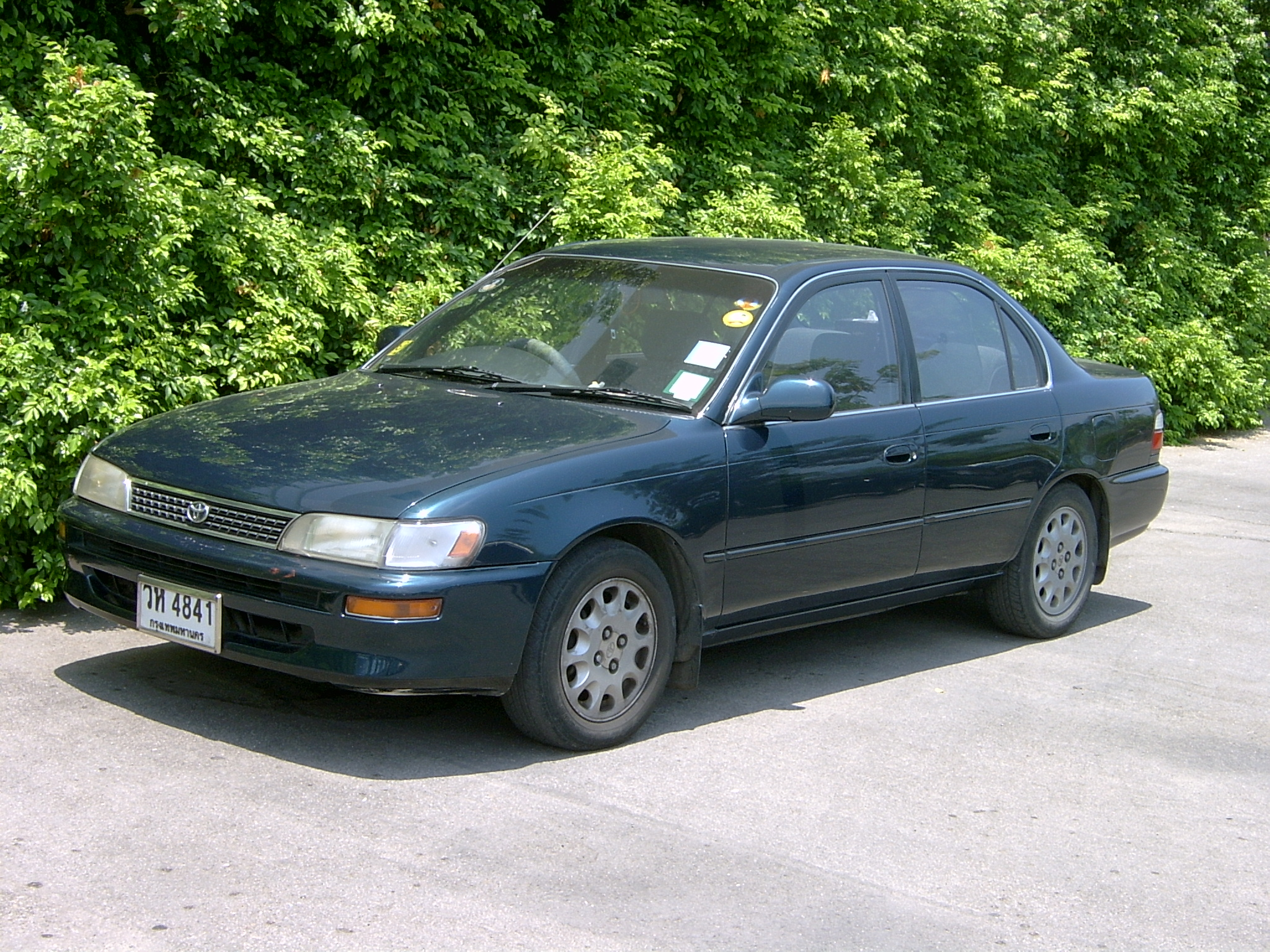
Toyota Corolla 1.6 GXi (facelift, Thailand)

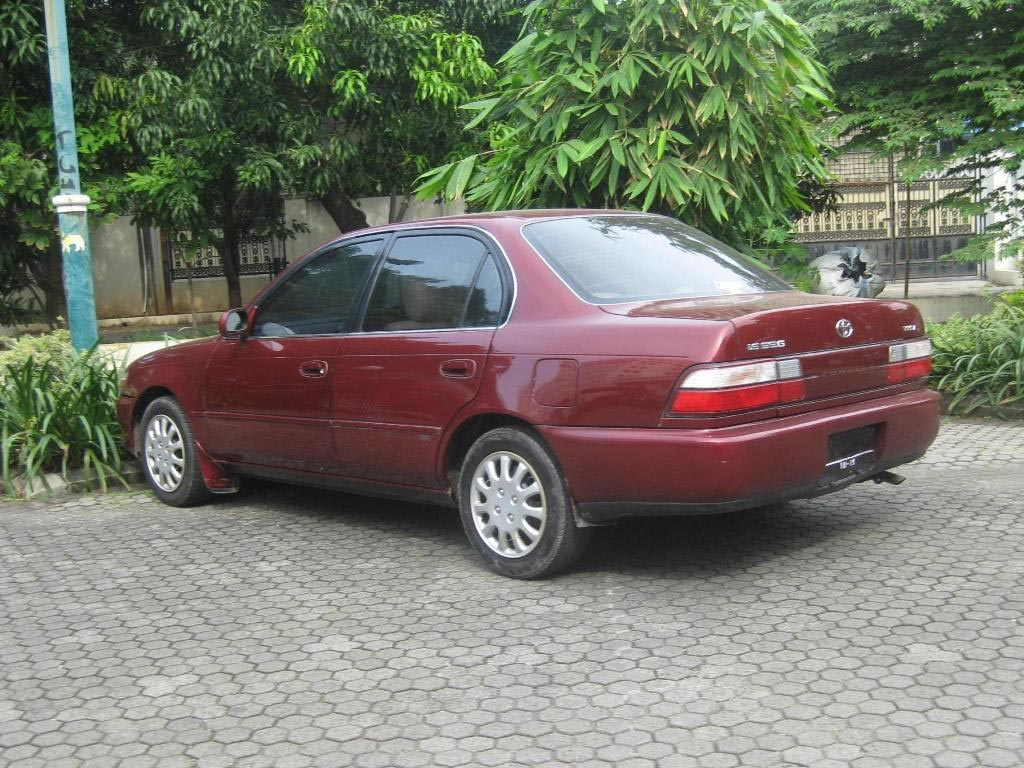
Toyota Great Corolla 1.6 SE-G (Indonesia; facelift look 1994–1995 same as with other Asian countries)

In the Philippines, the E100 Corolla is nicknamed "Big Body". Three variants of the E100 Corolla were sold there; XL, XE, and GLi. The XL and XE both offered the 1.3-litre, carbureted 2E engine, with the latter enjoying extra features like power steering, alloy wheels, digital clock and tachometer. The GLi received a 1.6-litre fuel-injected motor (4A-FE). The top model was offered in both 5-speed manual and 4-speed automatic transmissions, while the XL and XE both only came with the manual. This generation of the Corolla was the first 1.6-litre car to introduce 14-inch (360 mm) alloy wheels to the country in 1992. Other pioneer features that followed were rear seatbelts, front cup holders (late 1994) and a driver's airbag (late 1995). ABS followed during its later years.

In Thailand, this generation of Corolla is nicknamed "3 Ovals" or Sam Huang, due to its first usage of the current Toyota Logo. Launched in March 1992, Four variants were offered in the pre-facelift model; 1.3 XL, 1.3 GL, 1.6 GLi and the 1.6 LX Limited. The former two both offered the 1.3-litre, carbureted 2E engine paired with 5-speed manual transmission, while the latter two received the larger 1.6 litre fuel-injected 4A-FE engine paired with both 5-speed manual and 4-speed automatic transmissions, while the LX Limited was Imported from Japan and it was Limited to 1,000 units. This generation of the Corolla was the last to use carbureted engines and only offered fuel-injected engines starting from the facelifted model.

- 1.3 XL – 1.3 litre SOHC 2E engine, 5-Speed manual transmission, non-adjustable steering (2-spoke), no tachometer and power steering, includes stereo, 13-inch steel rims.
- 1.3 GL – 1.3 litre SOHC 2E engine, 5-Speed manual transmission, non-adjustable steering (2-spoke), includes tachometer and stereo, no power steering, 13-inch steel rims with hubcaps.
- 1.6 GLi – 1.6 litre DOHC 4A-FE engine, 5-Speed manual and 4-speed automatic transmissions, tilt steering adjustment (3-spoke), includes tachometer, power steering and stereo, power windows and door locks, power mirrors on automatic model, 14-inch alloy rims.
- 1.6 LX Limited – 1.6 litre DOHC 4A-FE engine, 5-Speed manual and 4-Speed automatic transmission, tilt steering adjustment (3-spoke), includes tachometer, power steering and stereo, power windows and door locks, power mirrors, 14-inch alloy rims. Limited only to 1,000 units.

The Facelifted model was launched in June 1994, Three variants were offered; 1.3 DXi, 1.3 GXi and the 1.6 GXi. The Former two are now powered with the 1.3-litre 4E-FE engine, while the latter one still offered with the 1.6-litre 4A-FE engine. The DXi model can only be paired with the 5-speed manual transmission, while the GXi models (both 1.3 and 1.6) can be paired with both 5-speed manual and 4-speed automatic transmissions.

- 1.3 DXi – 1.3 litre DOHC 4E-FE engine, 5-Speed manual transmission, non-adjustable steering (2-spoke), no tachometer and power steering, includes stereo, 13-inch steel rims with hubcaps.
- 1.3 GXi – 1.3 litre DOHC 4E-FE engine, 5-Speed manual and 4-speed automatic transmissions, tilt steering adjustment (3-spoke), includes tachometer, stereo, power steering, power windows and door locks, 13-inch steel rims with hubcaps.
- 1.6 GXi – 1.6 litre DOHC 4A-FE engine, 5-Speed manual and 4-speed automatic transmissions, tilt steering adjustment (3-spoke), includes tachometer, stereo, power steering, power windows and door locks, power mirrors, 14-inch alloy rims.

The E100 Corolla sedan is nicknamed as the "Great Corolla" in Indonesia and nicknamed "Corolla SEG 100" in Malaysia. Initially the trim levels were 1.3 SE and 1.6 SE-G. The smaller engined model was replaced by a 1.6 SE in 1994.

The 1.3 XLi, 1.5 GLi sedan, wagon, and Levin 1.5 SJ coupé were sold in Hong Kong.

Engine
Engine	Power	Torque
1.3 L 2E inline-four (petrol)	54 kW (73 PS); 65 kW (89 PS)	98 N⋅m (72 lb⋅ft)
1.3 L 4E-FE inline-four (petrol)	65 kW (88 PS); 69 kW (94 PS)	111 N⋅m; 82 lb⋅ft (11.3 kg⋅m); 113 N⋅m; 83 lb⋅ft (11.5 kg⋅m)
1.5 L 5A-FE inline-four (petrol)	77 kW (105 PS)	135 N⋅m; 100 lb⋅ft (13.8 kg⋅m); 137 N⋅m; 101 lb⋅ft (14.0 kg⋅m)
1.6 L 4A-FE inline-four (petrol)	85 kW (115 PS)	136 N⋅m (100 lb⋅ft)

== North America ==
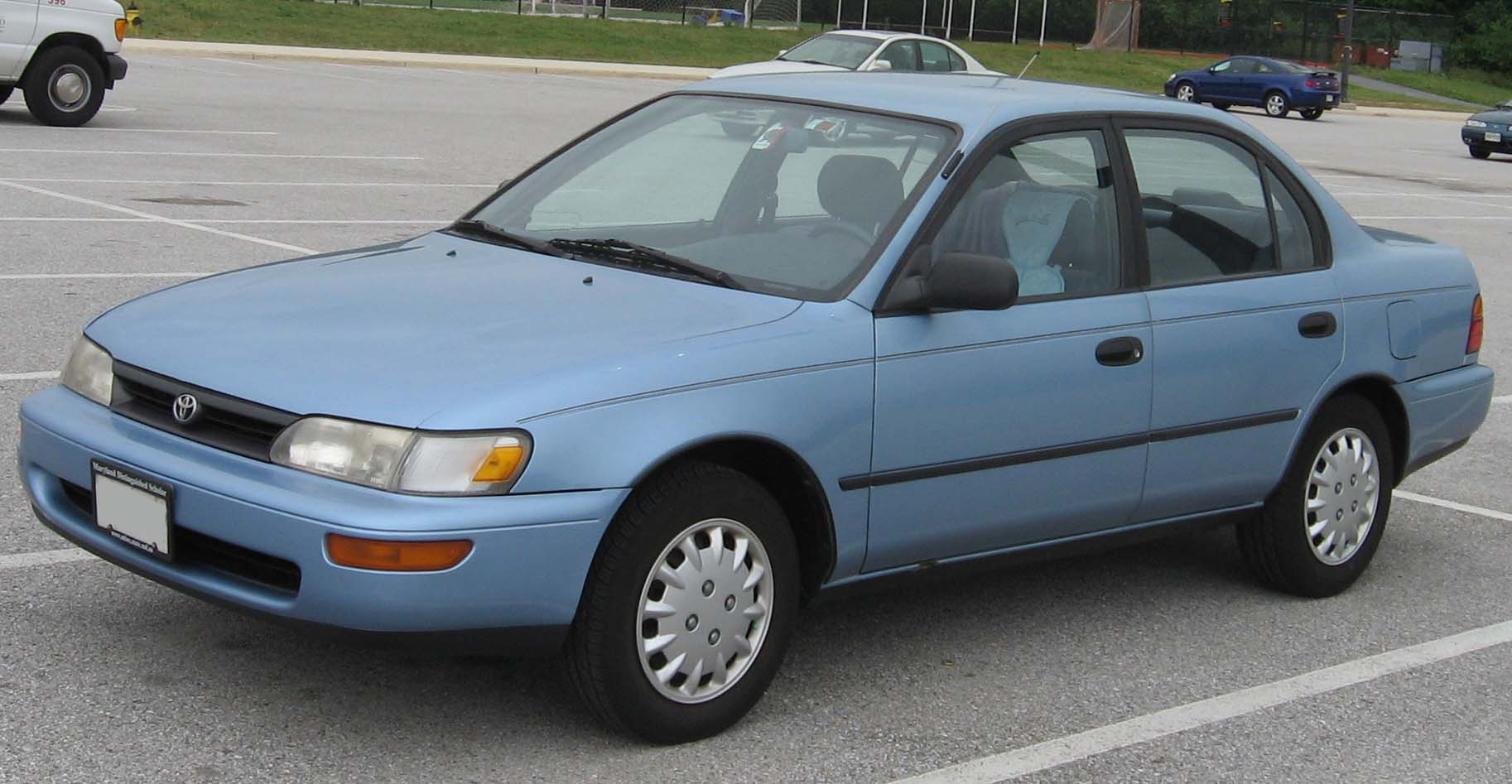
Pre-facelift Toyota Corolla DX sedan (AE102, US), note the longer bumpers on the North American models.

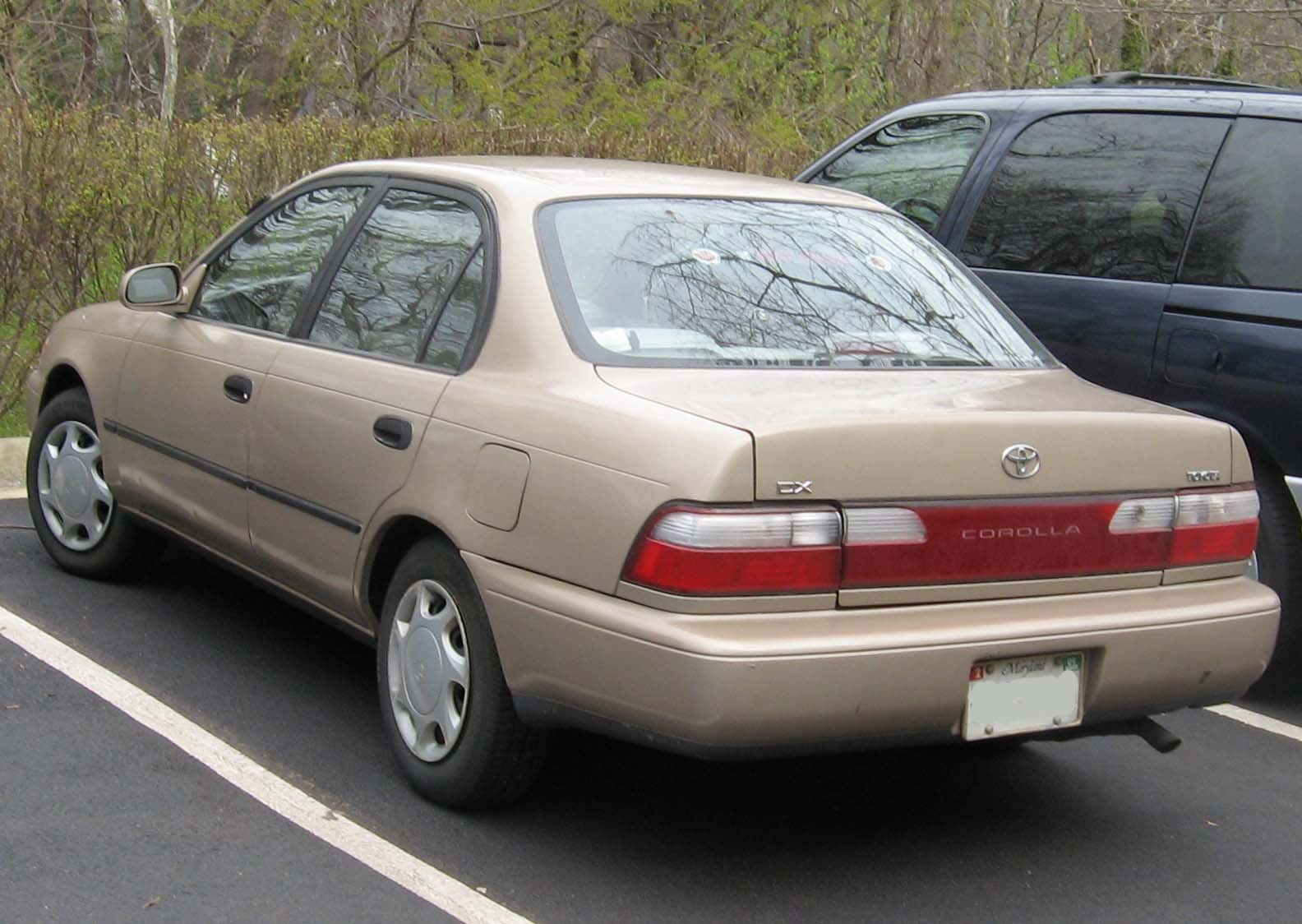
Facelift Toyota Corolla DX sedan (AE102, US)

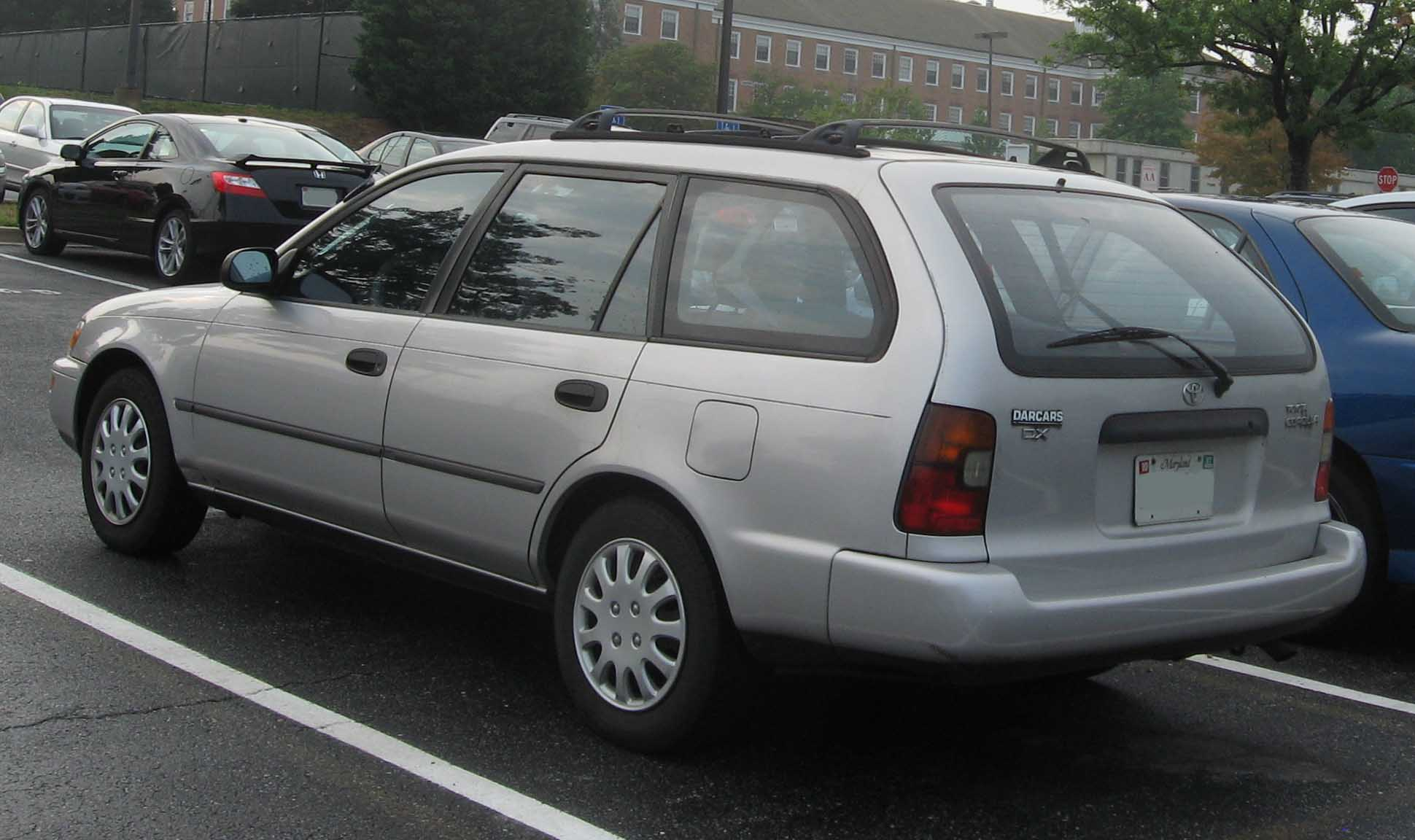
Toyota Corolla DX Wagon (AE102, US)

In North America, the Corolla was new for the 1993 model year. It had different headlights (independent high/low beams), grille, bumpers (extended) and boot garnish for the Base and DX Sedans. The Base and DX Sedans came with grey boot garnish, while the LE has the same amber/red which are the same colours as the rear combination lamps. The base model came with the 2nd-generation 1.6-litre 4A-FE engine with straighter intake-tracts in the head. The DX, LE and wagon came with the 1.8-litre 7A-FE. The 1993 and 1994 versions of the 7A-FE engine were rated at 86 kW (115 hp), later versions were rated at 78 kW (105 hp) mainly due to differences of the intake shape. Every model has fully independent suspension, front disk brakes and rear drum brakes. The LE (Luxury Edition) has sporty front seats and was available in the US with automatic transmission only or available in Canada with either automatic or manual gearbox. The sports coupe and All-Trac wagon were no longer offered or imported in this generation, with the Corolla coupe being replaced by the smaller Paseo. Some 1993 Corolla sedans sold were also produced in Japan, due to factory delays. All of the wagons were produced at the Takaoka plant in Japan.

Facelift was given for the 1996 model year. The DX received bright red/clear tail-lights and rear garnish, and new wheel covers. The Base model (and later the CE) came with restyled gray plastic boot garnish. The LE was discontinued.

In 1997, the DX wagon was dropped, but a special CE (Classic Edition) sedan was offered and it incorporated a number of popular features in one value-priced package. Among the standard equipment were the options for power windows and locks, A/C, power steering, a four-speaker stereo, manual remote mirrors and special floor mats and exterior badging. All models received additional side-impact protection to meet new federal standards. And for the first time, during 1997, all the Corollas sold in the United States were built in North America at the NUMMI plant in Fremont, California and the TMMC plant in Canada. By the end of the 1997 model year, the Corolla had become the best-selling nameplate in automotive history, overtaking the Volkswagen Beetle. Official Toyota accessories available as either factory upgrades or dealer-/port-installed options include: power sunroof (DX only), aluminium alloy wheels (DX only), front end mask, rear spoiler, mudguards, keyless entry and/or security system, passive alarm system, floor mats, wood dash accents, and a Gold emblem package (DX only).

Engine
Engine	Power	Torque
1.6 L 4A-FE inline-four (petrol)	75 kW (100 hp)	142 N⋅m (105 lb⋅ft)
1.6 L 4A-FE inline-four (petrol)	78 kW (105 hp)	140 N⋅m (100 lb⋅ft)
1.8 L 7A-FE inline-four (petrol)	78 kW (105 hp)	159 N⋅m (117 lb⋅ft)
1.8 L 7A-FE inline-four (petrol)	86 kW (115 hp)	156 N⋅m (115 lb⋅ft)

North American market chassis codes:

- AE101 — Sedan 4-door with 1.6 4A-FE (Standard, CE)
- AE102 — Sedan 4-door and Wagon 5-door with 1.8 7A-FE (DX, LE)

== Europe ==
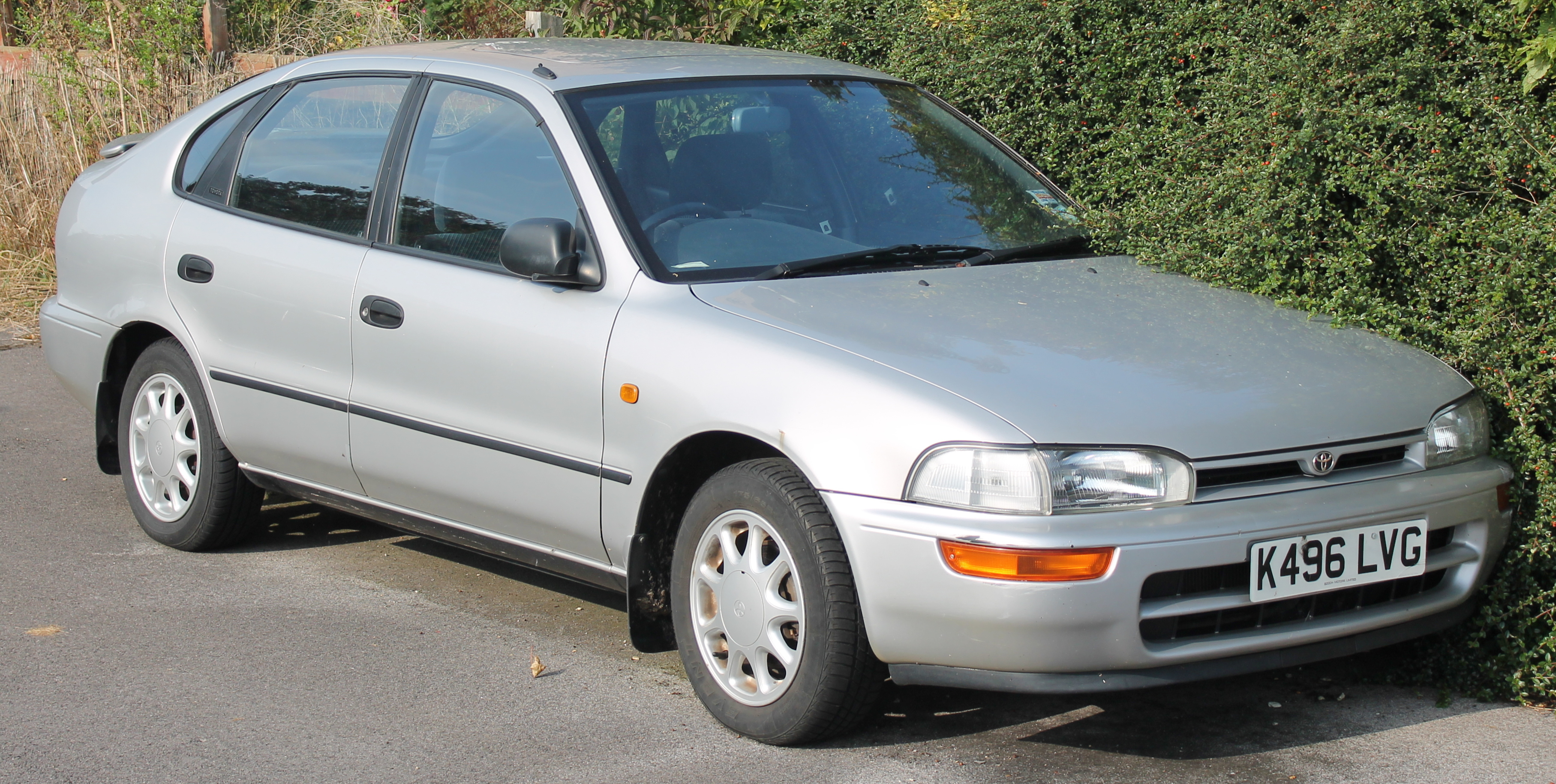

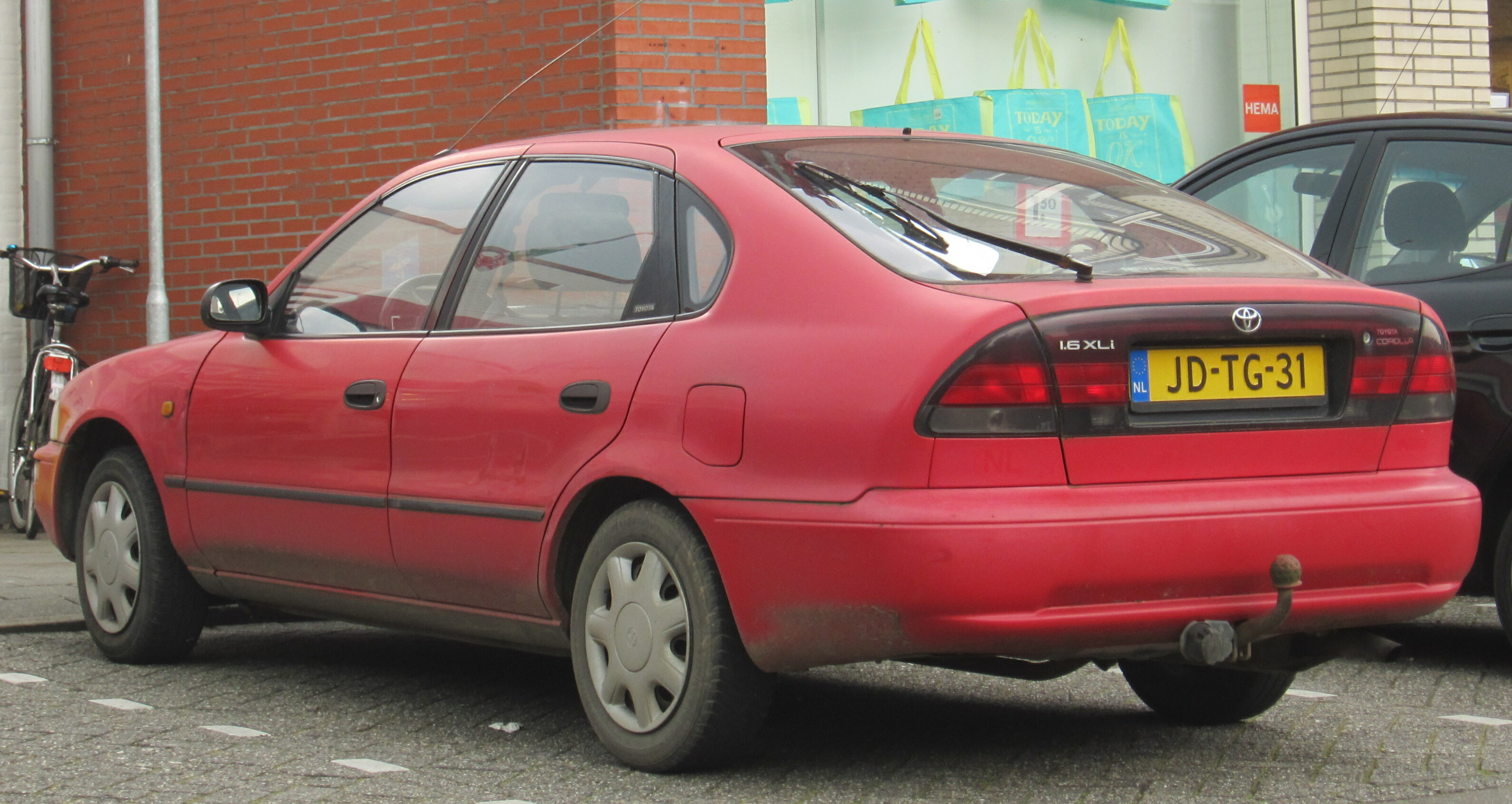
Toyota Corolla 5-door liftback (Europe)

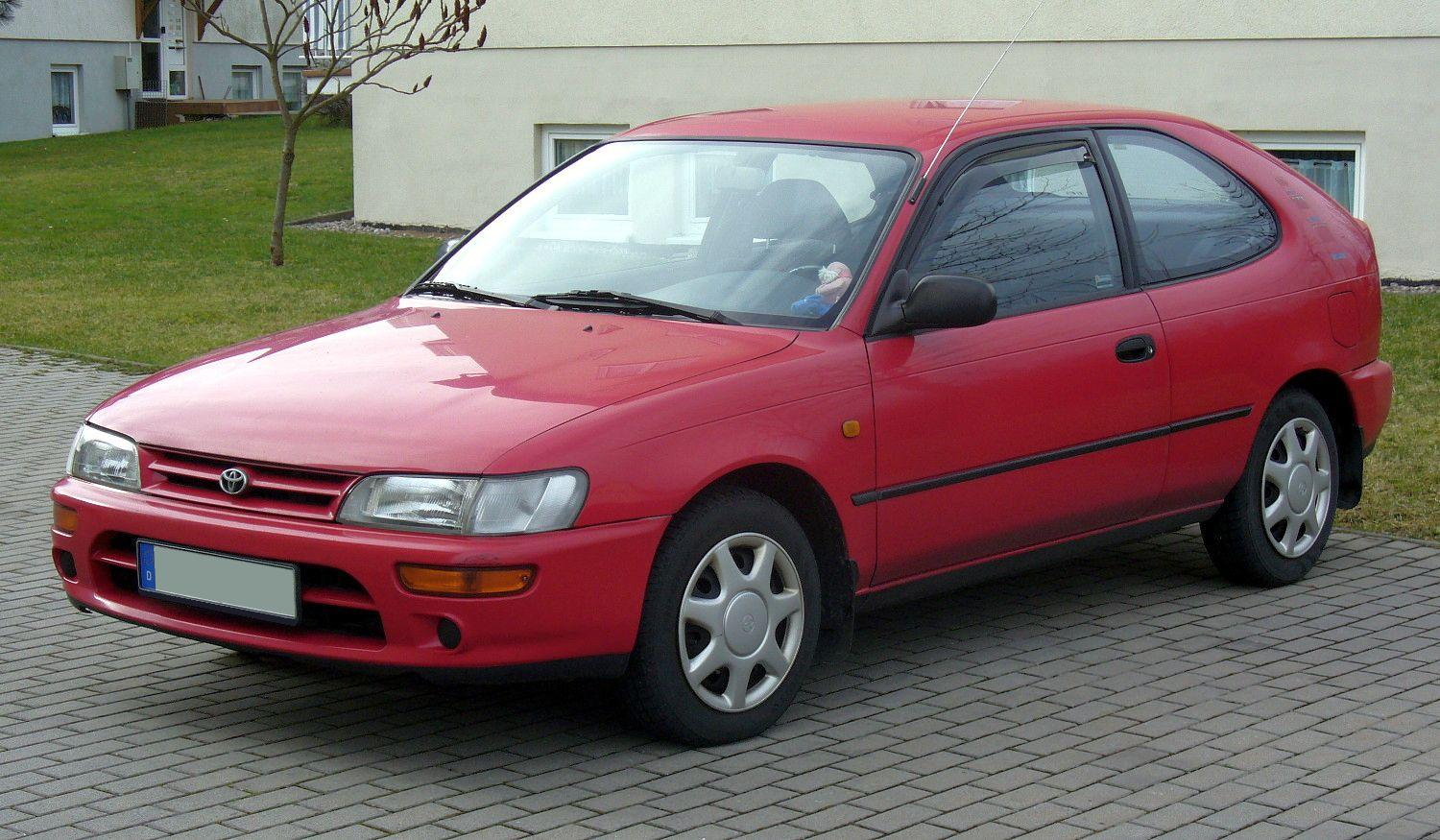
Toyota Corolla 1.6 Si 3-door hatchback (AE101, Germany)

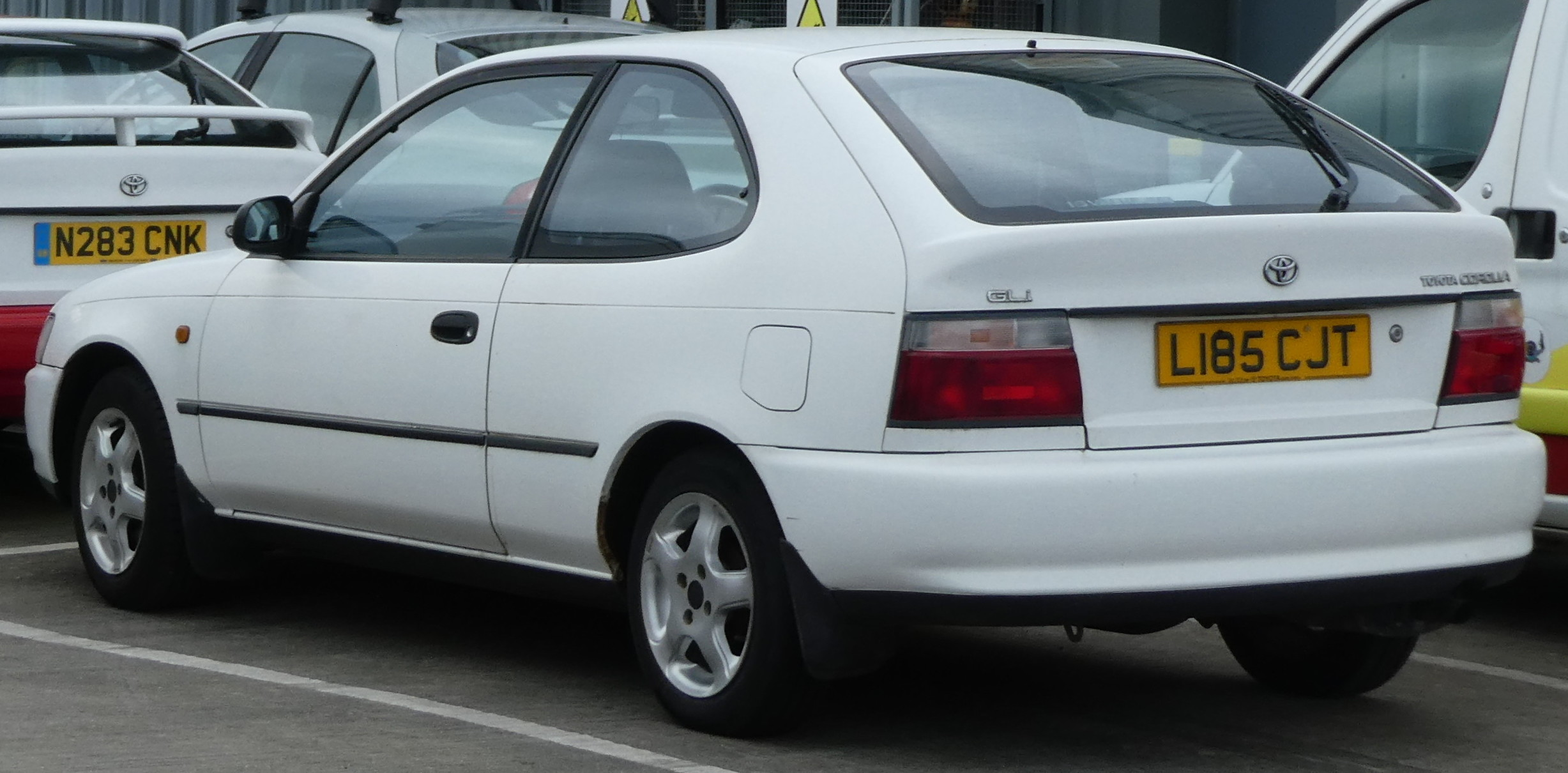
Toyota Corolla 1.3 GLi 3-door hatchback (EE101, UK)

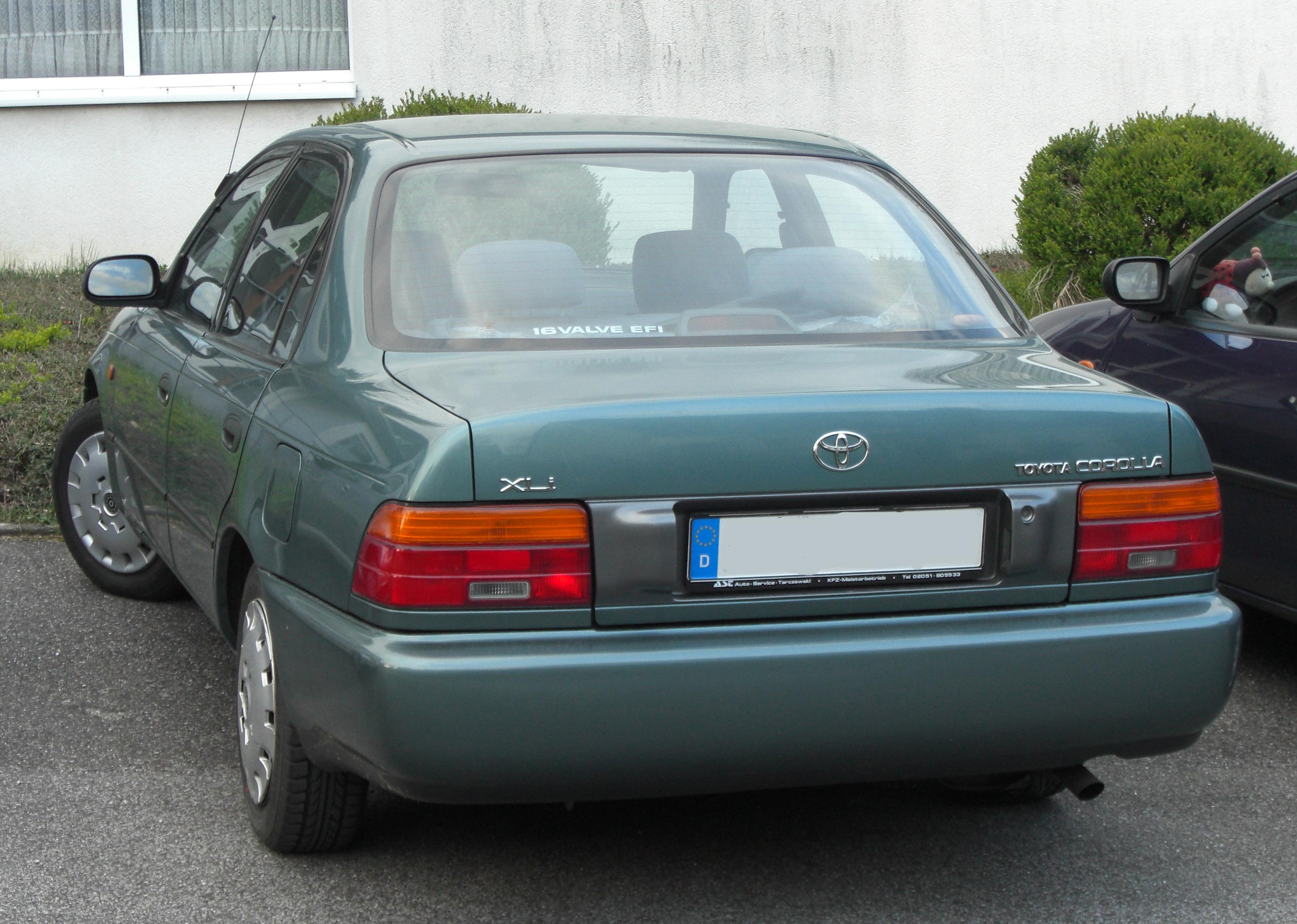
The European Corolla Saloon with license plate on the boot, this is 1.3 XLi (EE100, Germany)

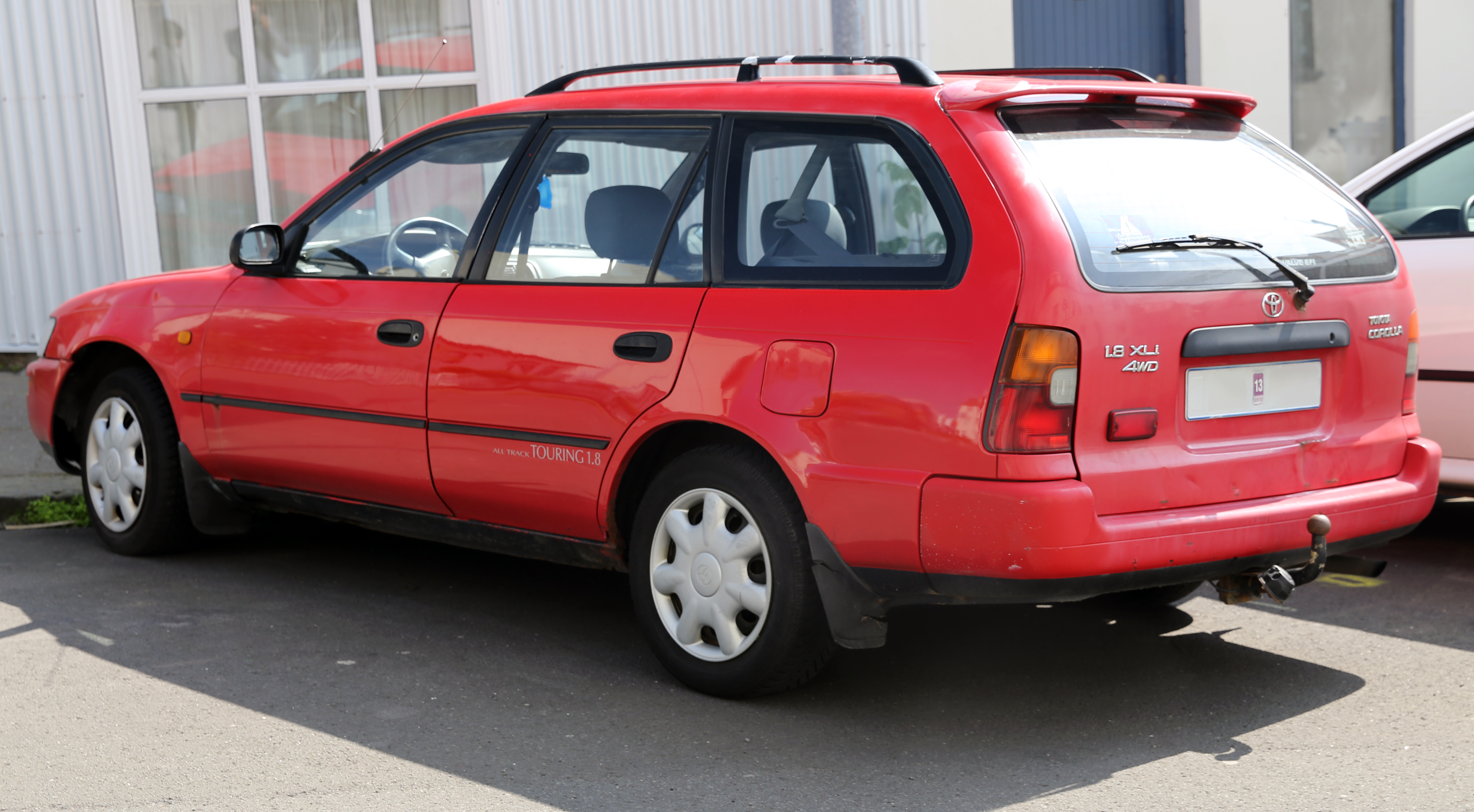
Corolla Wagon 1.8 XLi 4WD (AE103, Iceland)

The five-door Sprinter was sold as the Corolla Sprinter in some markets in Europe, and simply the Corolla liftback in others. The three and five-door Corolla hatchback was also sold in Europe, where it took the lion's share of Corolla sales. It was available mostly in normal (non-sports) specs unlike the three-door-only FX range available in Japan, although some mildly hot models were also marketed.

In Europe, the hatchback sold better than the saloon and estate. The typical trim levels are Base, XLi and GLi. A few select, rare models featured the 1.8L 7A-FE engine, including the 1.8 GXi 3-door hatchback in the UK, and the 1.8 XLi 4WD estate in certain markets. The sedan has its rear license plate mounted on the bootlid as opposed to the bumper on other region models. In Germany and some other markets, the 1331 cc 4E engine was referred to as a 1.4 since it displaced over 1300 cc.

British sales began a bit later than elsewhere in the world, in August 1992. Originally only the 1.3 and 1.6 petrol engines were on offer, the 2.0 Diesel and the faintly sporting 1.8 GXi (sold as the 1.8 GTi in most of mainland Europe) were added in March 1993. The GXi has a claimed 120 PS (88 kW; 118 hp), three horsepower more than the engine as installed in the 1.8 4WD and as much again more than the fuel injected 1.6. In August 1995 the lineup was revised; the new models in the UK market were Sportif, GS, CD, Si, and CDX. The GS featured a fully colour-coded exterior and with full electrics and a tilt/slide steel sunroof, as well as an upgraded interior with white dials and a rev counter.

In Germany, Europe's largest national automobile market, the E100 sustained the Corolla's reputation for reliability and economy. In 1995, it topped the small family car class in a reliability survey of 4-6 year old cars undertaken by the German Automobile Association (ADAC), with 5.3 recorded breakdowns per 1000 cars for four-year-old cars and 10.1 for six-year-old cars: this compared with 12.0 breakdowns per 1,000 cars for four-year-old Volkswagen Golfs and 21.8 for six-year-old Golfs. (The class loser was the Fiat Tipo with 38.3 breakdowns per 1,000 for four-year-old cars and 44.0 for six-year-old Tipos.)

Engine
Engine	Power	Torque	Notes
1.3 L 2E inline-four	53 kW (72 hp)	101 N⋅m (74 lb⋅ft)	
1.3 L 4E-FE inline-four	65 kW (88 hp)	111 N⋅m (82 lb⋅ft)	"1.4" in some markets
1.6 L 4A-FE inline-four	84 kW (114 hp)	145 N⋅m (107 lb⋅ft)	
1.8 L 7A-FE inline-four	86 kW (117 hp)	156 N⋅m (115 lb⋅ft)	AE103 (4WD)
1.8 L 7A-FE inline-four	88 kW (120 hp)		AE102 (GTi, GXi)
2.0 L 2C-III inline-four (diesel)	53 kW (72 hp)	129 N⋅m (95 lb⋅ft)	Also with oxi-cat

European market chassis:

- EE100 — 1.3L 2E
- EE101 — 1.3L 4E-FE
- AE101 — 1.6L 4A-FE
- AE102 — 1.8L 7A-FE
- AE103 — 1.8L 7A-FE 4WD
- CE100 — 2.0L 2C diesel

== Australia/New Zealand ==
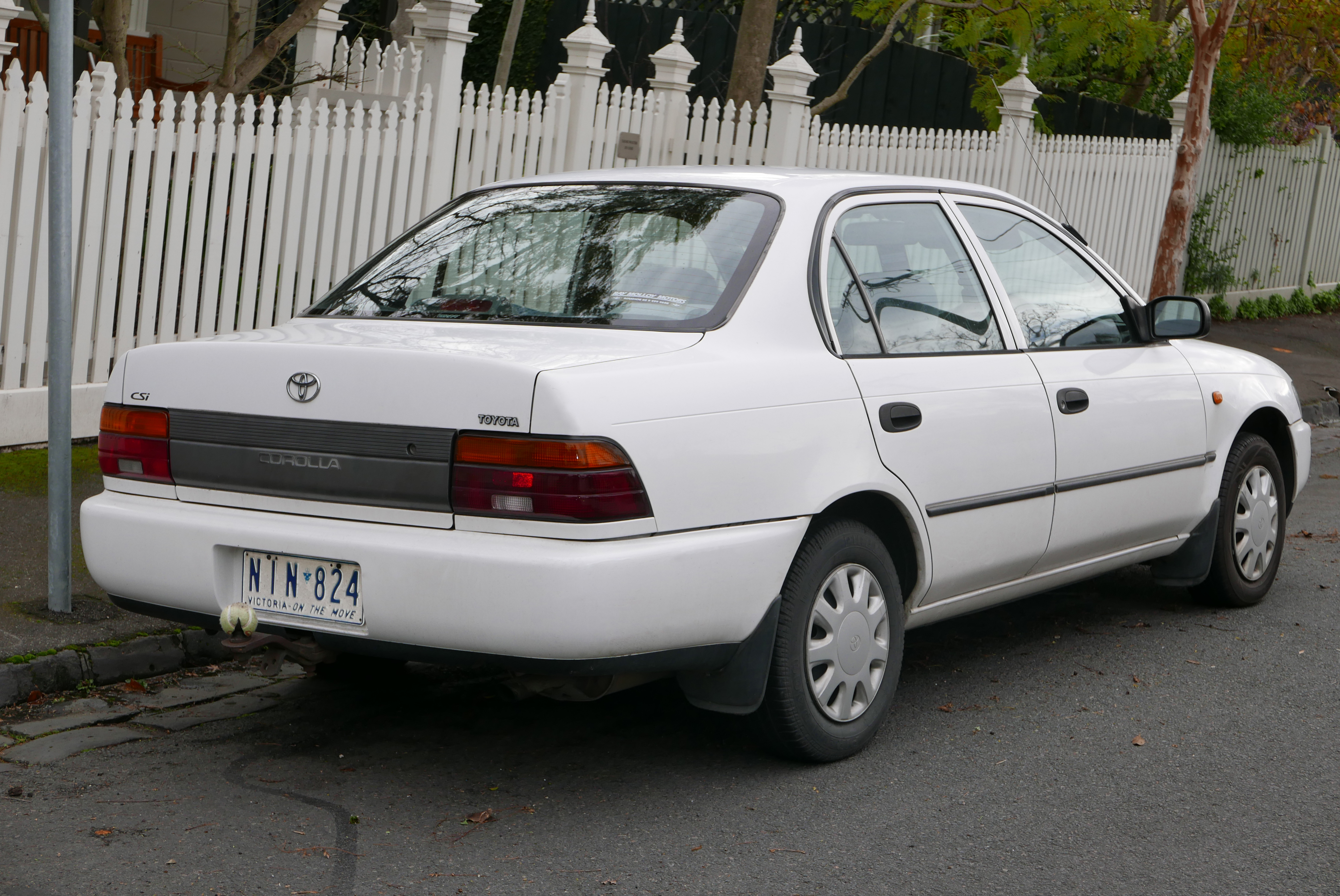
1995 Toyota Corolla (AE101R) CSi sedan

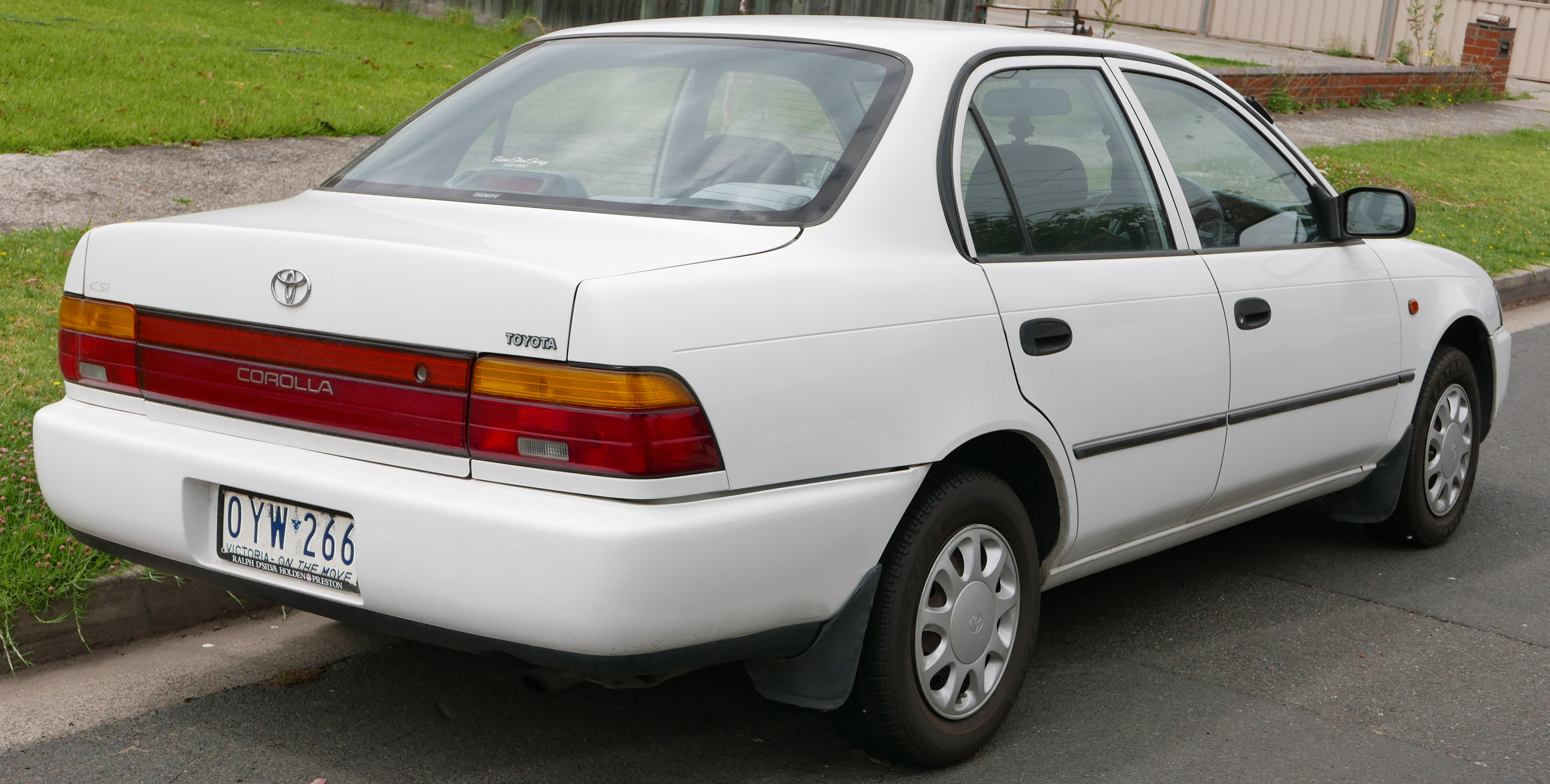
1998 Toyota Corolla (AE101R) CSi sedan

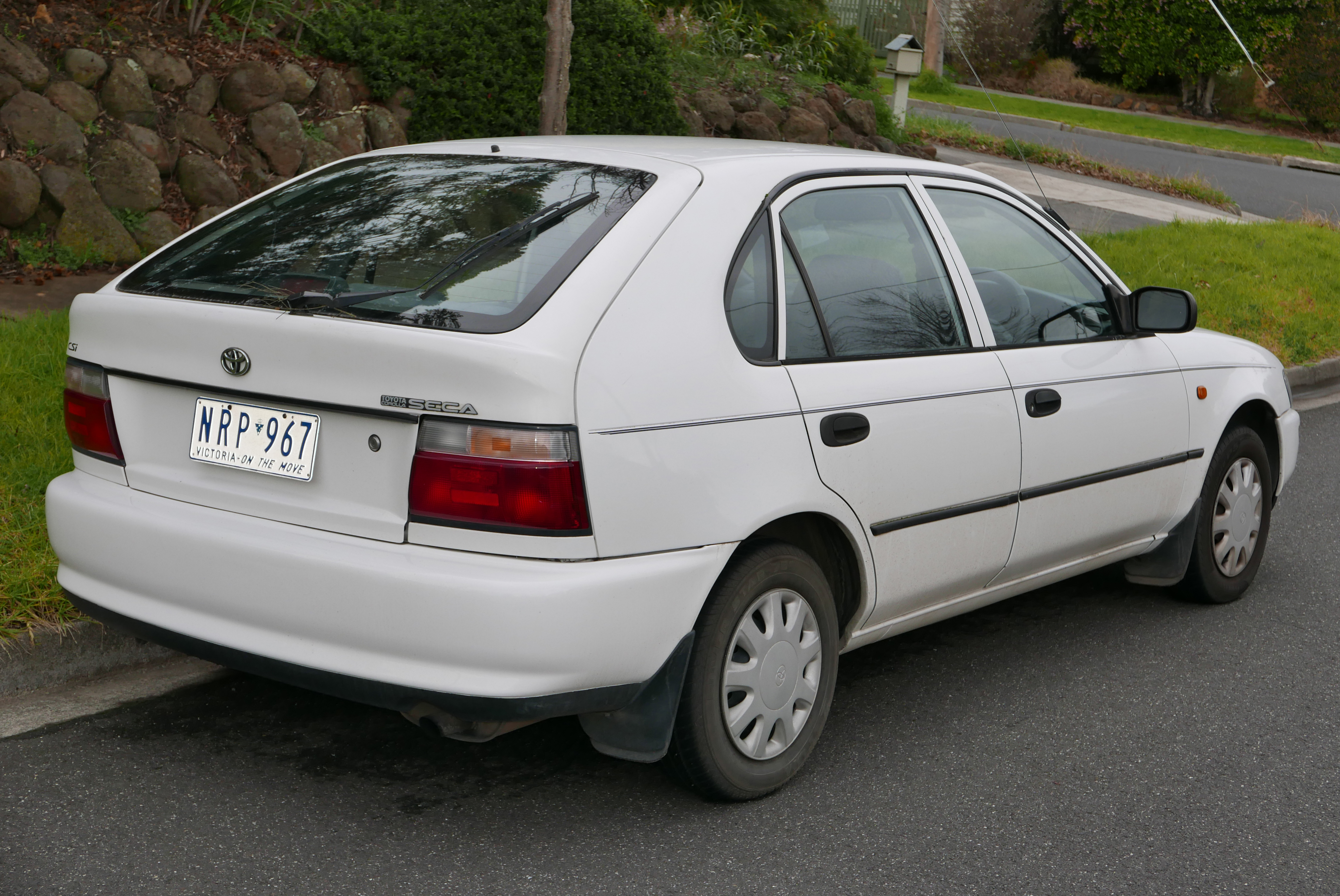
1996 Toyota Corolla (AE101R) CSi Seca 5-door hatchback

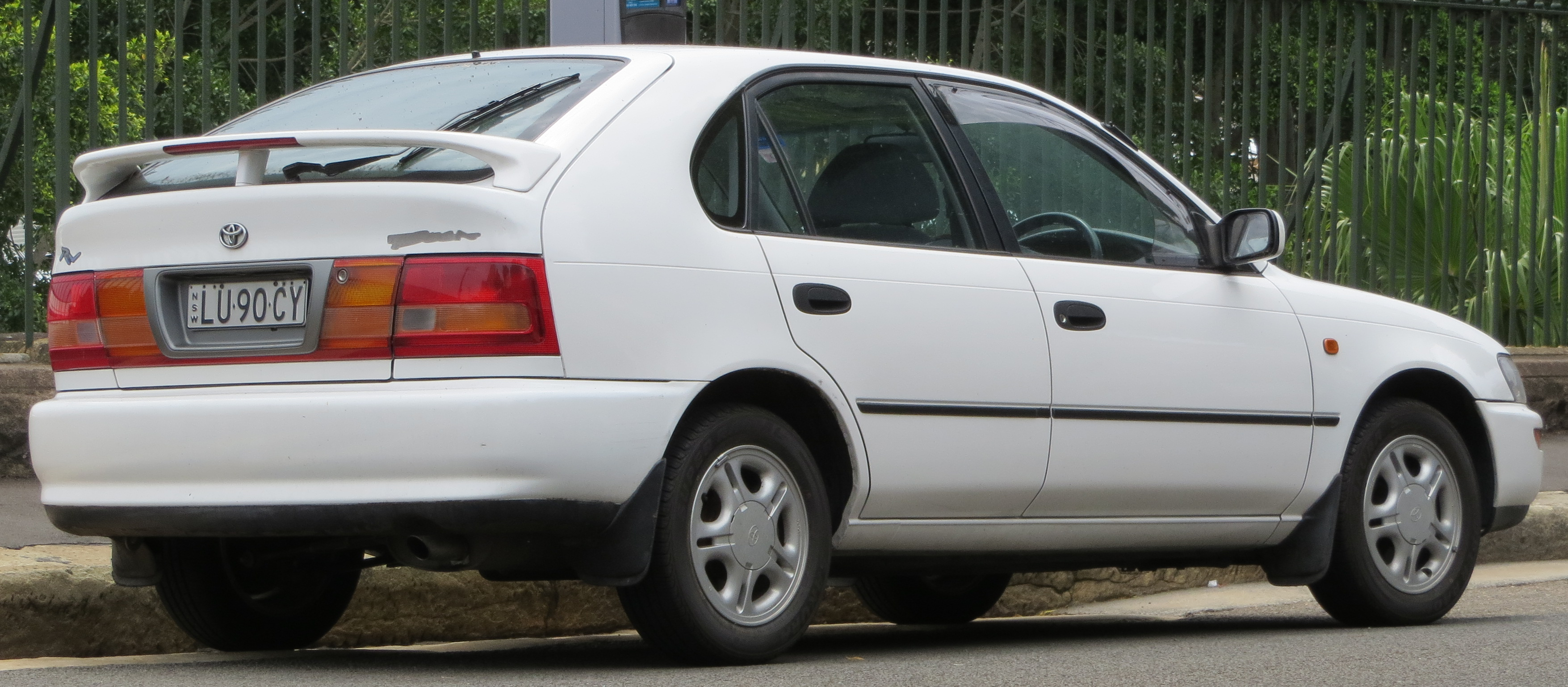
1998 Toyota Corolla (AE102R) RV Seca 5-door hatchback

In late 1992, New Zealand-assembled E100 Corollas were introduced to the New Zealand market. These vehicles were assembled at Toyota's Thames factory. Trim levels consisted of the 1.3-litre XL and the 1.6-litre GL, GS, and GLX. Available bodystyles were sedan, five-door hatchback, five-door liftback, and five-door wagon. There was also a van version of the 1.3-litre hatchback; this model was a strict two-seater. The 1.3 is carburetted while the 1.6 is fuel injected, providing 81 kW (110 PS). The 1.6's lack of low-end power was mentioned by period road testers and later the torquier 1.8-litre engine was also made available. The entire Corolla range now received power steering as standard equipment. As with most other New Zealand-assembled Toyotas of the eighties and nineties, ex-Formula One driver Chris Amon had been allowed to adjust the suspension settings of the E100 Corolla. The locally built cars thus included a thicker rear swaybar as opposed to Japanese imported models.

During 1994, the E100 Corolla became the first Toyota model to be built at the new Altona plant (from 1968 until 1993, the Corolla had been produced at the Port Melbourne facility). This model came in hatchback (Seca) and sedan variants. The trim levels consisted of 1.6L CSi (base model), 1.6L and 1.8L CSX, 1.8L Conquest, sporty 1.8L RV (hatchback only) and the top of the range 1.8L Ultima (sedan only). Special edition models were included in the model lineup, and between 1994 and 1996 Toyota also imported the five-door liftback Sprinter model. In 1999, production of the E100 Corolla in Australia was terminated and Toyota Australia returned to Japanese imports, this time model AE112R.

In May 2017, ANCAP performed a head-on crash test between a 1998 E100 Seca and a 2017 E180 Auris/Corolla. The E100 scored 0.40 out of a possible 16 points, highlighting the safety improvement of newer cars.
