= Metro Pakistan =

Pakistan cash and carry chain

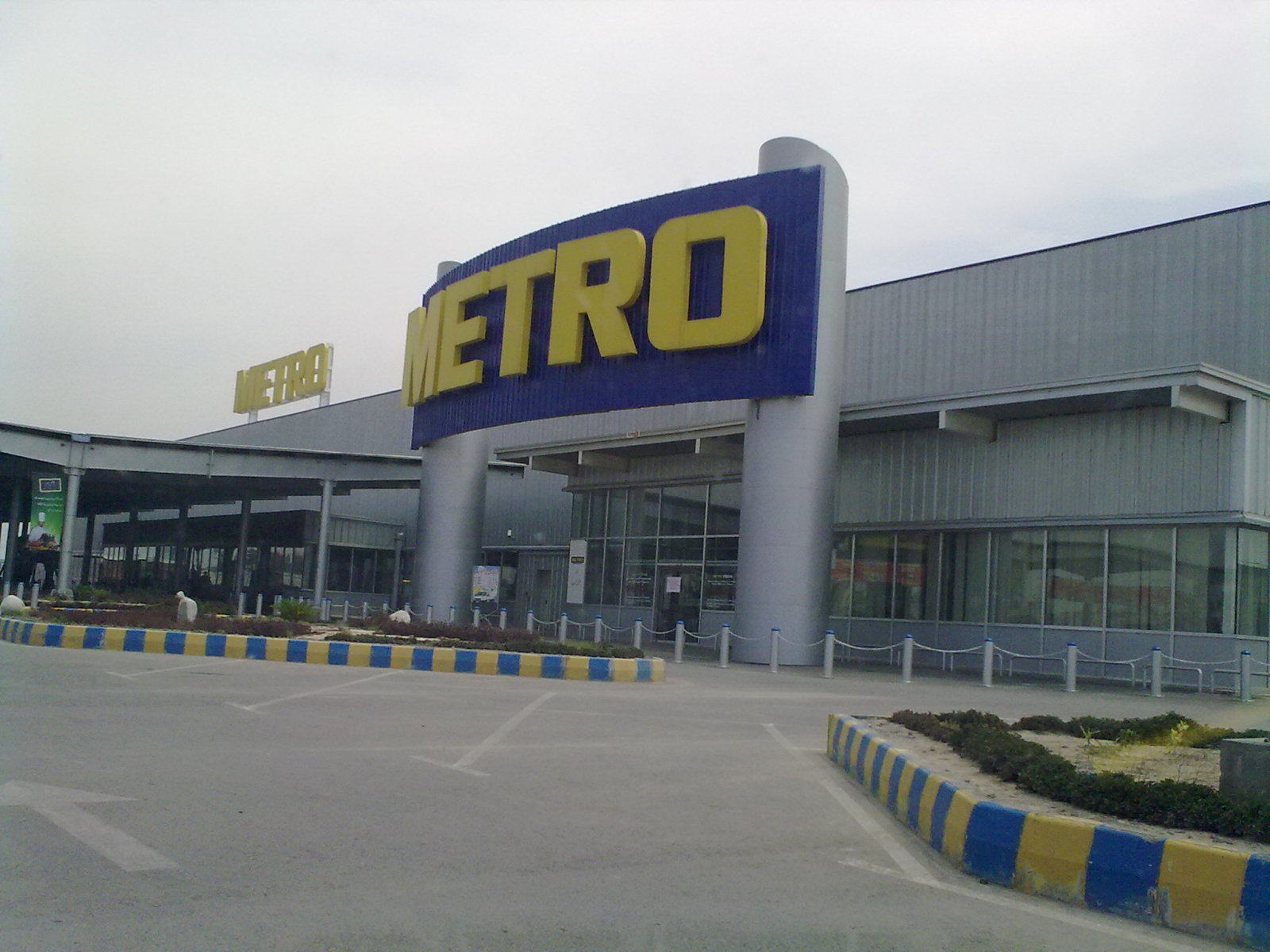
- Metro Cash & Carry, Faisalabad
- Type: Unlisted public company
- Industry: Retail
- Founded: 2005; 21 years ago (as Makro Habib); 2007; 19 years ago (as Metro Cash & Carry Pakistan)
- Headquarters: Lahore, Pakistan
- Number of locations: 10 (2024)
- Area served: Pakistan
- Key people: Andriy Tsvykh (CEO)
- Products: Electronics; movies and music; home and furniture; home improvement; clothing; footwear; jewelry; toys; health and beauty; pet supplies; sporting goods and fitness; auto; photo finishing; craft supplies; party supplies; grocery
- Total assets: ▲ Rs. 12.508 billion (US$45 million) (2024)
- Total equity: ▲ Rs. 10.415 billion (US$37 million) (2024)
- Owner: Thal Limited (60%); Metro AG (40%)
- Parent: Thal Limited
- Website: metro.pk
- Footnotes; Financials as of 30 June 2024

Metro Pakistan, formerly known as Metro-Habib and Makro Habib, is a Pakistani supermarket chain stores operator based in Lahore. It is a joint venture between the German chain Metro Cash & Carry and Thal Limited, a subsidiary of the House of Habib.

Metro opened its first store in 2007. It operates 10 supermarkets, in total, in Karachi, Lahore, Islamabad, Faisalabad, and Multan.

== History ==
=== 2005–2012: Early history ===
Makro Habib Pakistan was founded in 2005 as a joint venture between the Dutch wholesale conglomerate SHV Holdings, operating under the Makro brand, and the House of Habib, with SHV initially holding a 70 percent stake. The company opened its first store in SITE Industrial Area of Karachi in 2006.

In 2006, Makro-Habib began construction of a wholesale outlet in Saddar Town on a 4.9-acre piece of land at Webb Ground in the Lines Area, after obtaining a sub-lease from the Army Welfare Trust (AWT). Webb Ground was originally leased to AWT for commercial purposes in December 2002. The land had earlier been used as a playground by Karachi Grammar School and later designated as an amenity plot under the Lines Area Redevelopment Scheme. The project was eventually halted when the Supreme Court of Pakistan ruled that the lease granted by the federal government to the AWT for the Webb Ground plot was unlawful and ordered Makro-Habib to dismantle its structures and restore the land to its original status as a playground. The judgment revealed complex dealings involving the Government of Pakistan, the Army Welfare Trust (AWT), and the City District Government Karachi (CDGK). The court found that the government had transferred the plot to CDGK for amenity purposes before AWT subleased it to Makro-Habib. Despite being aware of CDGK's prior claim to the land, Makro-Habib proceeded with construction. The court criticized the lease arrangements as undervalued and not in public or governmental interest. They filed a review petition and obtained an interim order maintaining the status quo until the petition's resolution. The review petition was ultimately dismissed by the court in 2015 and subsequently the store was permanently closed.

In 2007, Makro's plan to open a store in Model Town, Lahore, was halted by a court injunction when Justice Muzammal Ahmad Khan of the Lahore High Court stayed the construction of store following writ petitions challenging the conversion of an amenity plot into a department store. The petitioners cited a prior ruling that prohibited converting the plot to commercial use without modifying the society's master plan. In 2008, the Environmental Protection Agency of Punjab approved the area for store construction, and the store was opened in Model Town in 2009.

In October 2007, Metro Cash and Carry, a separate German wholesale chain, expanded its operations to Pakistan, and opened its first wholesale center in Lahore. Six month later, Metro opened another business-to-business store in Islamabad.

In 2008, Makro-Habib store was opened near Star Gate on Shahrah-e-Faisal in Karachi. In the same year, the Dutch parent company exited the Pakistan and sold its entire stake to House of Habib.

By 2009, Metro Cash and Carry changed its business model from business-to-business to hybrid model where small consumers can also purchase products. In 2010, Metro introduced the own brands concept in Pakistan, allowing small businesses to feature their products in Metro Cash and Carry stores nationwide. The initiative showcased five core brands across two price tiers, with packaging designed by Metro.

=== 2012–present: Merger and growth ===
In 2012, Makro and Metro Cash & Carry merged their operations in Pakistan. At the time of merger, Metro Cash and Carry was operating five wholesale outlets in Pakistan: two in Lahore, and one each in Karachi, Islamabad, and Faisalabad. Makro Habib Pakistan also had five stores, with three in Karachi and two in Lahore.

In 2015, Metro opened a new store in Faisalabad, Punjab. Two years later, it was named as the best place to work in Pakistan.

In 2020, Metro inaugurated its tenth Pakistani outlet in Multan, its first in southern Punjab.

== See also ==
- Metro Cash & Carry
- Makro
