= House of Habib =

Pakistani conglomerate family

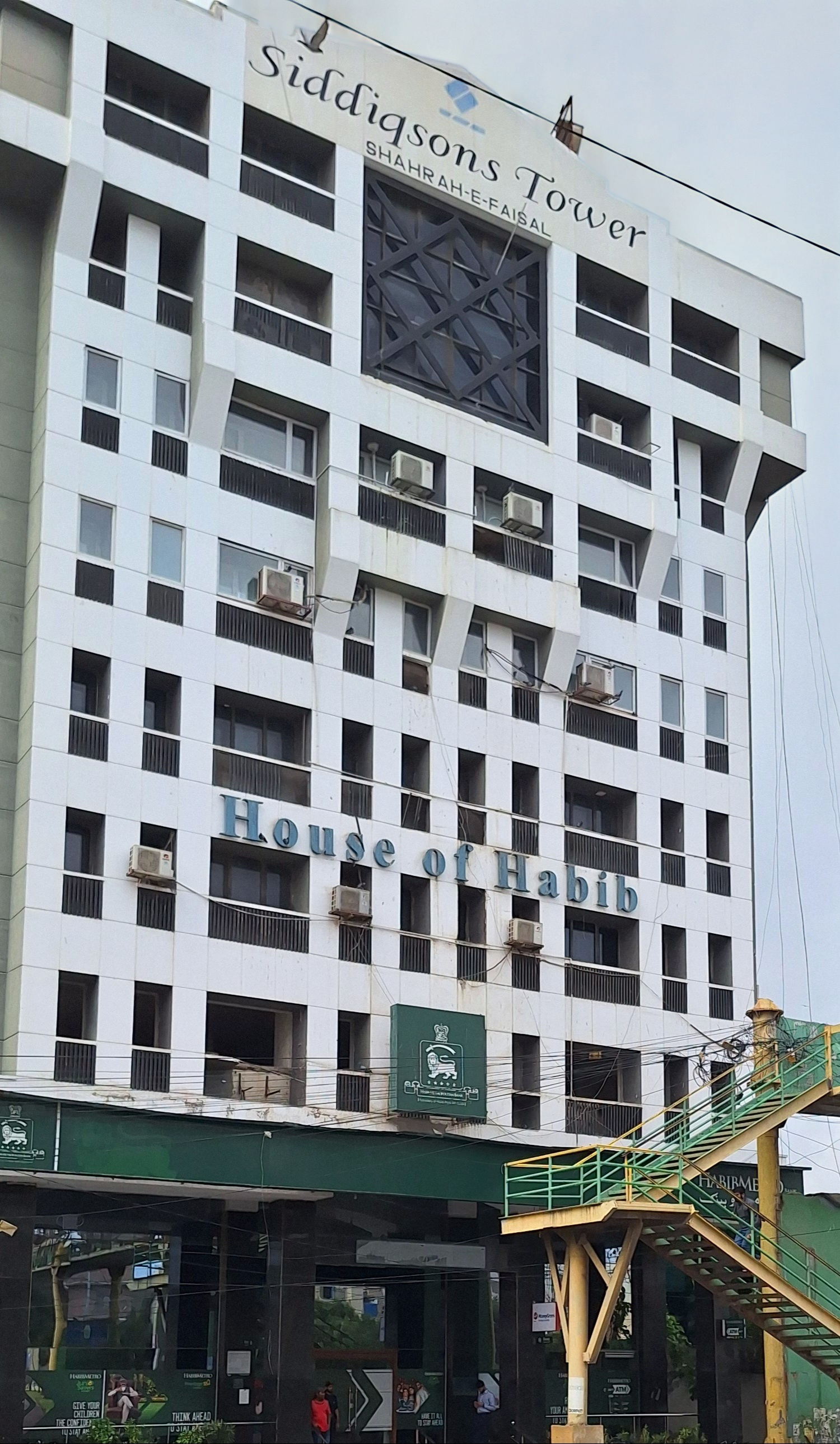
- Headquarters of House of Habib in Karachi
- Type: Corporate group
- Founded: 1841; 185 years ago
- Founder: Habib Esmail
- Headquarters: Karachi, Pakistan
- Revenue: ▲US$1.8 billion
- Total assets: ▲US$1 billion
- Number of employees: 12,000
- Website: www.hoh.net

The House of Habib (Urdu pronunciation: [ha.ˈbiːb] hah-BEEB) is a group of companies headquartered in Karachi, Pakistan. The group was originally founded by Habib Esmail in Bombay (British India) in 1841.

== History ==
The roots of House of Habib goes back to the 19th century when it commenced as Khoja Mithabhai Nathoo in 1841 in Bombay, operating as a family business. In 1891, a family member named Habib Esmail played a pivotal role in the company's expansion. Subsequently, the company evolved into a major trading firm. In 1921, his four sons joined the business, and Habib & Sons was established, which eventually transformed into today's Habib Bank Limited.

The House of Habib occupies a significant place in Pakistan's early history. Habib Bank was relocated to Pakistan at the personal request of its first Governor General Mohammad Ali Jinnah. Mohammad Ali Habib extended assistance to the fledgling state "even before the Government of Pakistan was ready to issue appropriate government paper". He provided a Rs. 80 million loan when the Reserve Bank of India failed to release Pakistan's share of Rs. 900 million. It's reported that Mohammad Ali Habib presented a blank cheque from Lloyds Bank to Governor General Jinnah, who then filled in Rs. 80 million.

As early as 1912, the Habib family established offices in Vienna and Geneva. In 1921, Habib and Sons was incorporated, specializing in brass, metal scraps, and gold, bearing the embossed Lion of Ali and Zulfiqar. This emblem remained the insignia of Habib Bank for a significant duration of its history. The Rafiq Habib family oversees the House of Habib, distinct from the Dawood Habib family, which operates the Dawood Habib Group of Companies.

== Family members ==
- Esmail Ali
  - Habib Esmail Ali m. Rehmatbai Janmohamed
    - Ghulam Ali Habib
    - Ahmed Habib
    - Dawood Habib (1902 - 1975) m. Zainab Rangoonwalla
      - Zubeida Habib (1929 - 2022) m. Hyder Habib (1930 - 2011)
      - Hamid D. Habib (1926 - 2000) m. Nargis Jumani
      - Rashid D. Habib (1927 - 1994) m. Mehrunissa Fazelbhoy
      - Ali Raza Habib (1930 - 1997) m. Razia Tharia
      - Abbas D. Habib (1933 - 1991) m. Niamet Qasim
      - Hussain D. Habib (1936 - 2003) m. Sakoon Gokal
      - Habib Mohamed D. Habib (1940 - 2005) m. Shamim Fatemah Habib (1943 - 2012)
        - Zain Habib
        - Hyder Habib
        - Ahmed Habib
    - Mohamedali Habib (1904 - 1958) m. Saker Rahim Currim Chatriwalla (1914 – 1987)
      - Hyder Habib (1930 - 2011) m. Zubeida Habib
      - Suleman Habib (1931 - 1999) m. Meherafroze Mirza
        - Ali Suleman Habib
      - H.M. Habib (1936 - 2013) m. Fatima Ladak
      - Rafiq Habib (1937 - 2025) m. Jamila Dharamsey
      - Shamim Fatemah Habib (1943 - 2012) m. Habib M. Dawood Habib

== Subsidiaries ==
=== Listed ===
- Agriauto Industries
  - Agriauto Stamping Company
- HabibMetro
- Habib Insurance
- Habib Rice
- Habib Sugar Mills
- Shabbir Tiles
- Toyota Indus
- Thal Limited
  - Habib Metro Pakistan
  - ThalNova Power
  - Thal Boshoku Pakistan
  - Thal Engineering

=== Unlisted ===
- Habib Bank AG Zurich
- Auvitronics Limited

== Educational institutes ==
- Habib Public School
- Habib University

== See also ==
- List of largest companies in Pakistan
