= Toyota Indus =

Pakistani automobile manufacturer

Indus Motor Company Ltd.
- Type: Public
- Traded as: PSX: INDU; KSE 100 component
- Industry: Automotive
- Founded: 1 July 1990
- Headquarters: Port Qasim, Karachi, Pakistan
- Area served: Pakistan; Egypt
- Key people: Mohamedali R. Habib (chairman); Ali Asghar Jamali (CEO); Shinji Yanagi (director & vice chairman)
- Products: Automobiles
- Revenue: ▲ Rs. 215.13 billion (US$770 million) (2025)
- Operating income: ▲ Rs. 37.48 billion (US$130 million) (2025)
- Net income: ▲ Rs. 23.00 billion (US$82 million) (2025)
- Total assets: ▲ Rs. 184.77 billion (US$660 million) (2025)
- Total equity: ▲ Rs. 76.95 billion (US$280 million) (2025)
- Owner: Overseas Pakistan Investors AG (44%); Toyota Motor Corporation (31.8%); Toyota Tsusho Corporation (16%); Thal Limited (6.25%)
- Number of employees: 2,089 (2025)
- Parent: House of Habib; Toyota Motor Corporation
- Website: toyota-indus.com

Indus Motor Company Limited, operating as Toyota Indus, is a Pakistani automobile manufacturer which is a subsidiary of Japanese multinational automaker Toyota Motor Corporation. It is based in Karachi, Pakistan.

Founded in 1989, as a joint venture between House of Habib, Toyota Tsusho and Toyota Motors.

Indus Motor is the authorized assembler and manufacturer of Toyota and Daihatsu vehicles, auto parts and accessories in Pakistan since 1 July 1990 at its 109.5 acres (0.443 km^{2}) manufacturing plant at Port Qasim Industrial Zone, outside Karachi.

== History ==
Indus Motor Company was incorporated as a public limited company in December 1989 and was listed on the Karachi Stock Exchange in 1992. The company started its commercial operations in March 1993.

In March 2000, the company started production of the L500 series Daihatsu Mira in Pakistan which was locally sold as the Daihatsu Cuore with an 850-cc engine.

In 2008, Toyota acquired 9.83 million shares from Overseas Investors AG and general public at the price of Rs. 370 (equivalent to Rs. 1,900 or US$6.70 in 2021) per share.

In January 2012, the company halted production of the L500 series Daihatsu Cuore in Pakistan.

Former Chairman of Indus Motor Company Ltd, Ali Suleman Habib died on 18 April 2020.

== Operations ==
In May 2023, Toyota Indus announced that the Corolla Cross Hybrid would be locally assembled in Pakistan.

Toyota Indus started exporting automotive parts to Toyota Egypt in July 2023.

After an investment of over $100 million, the company inaugurated its hybrid electric vehicle assembly line on 6 December, 2023. Following the inauguration of the assembly line, the company commenced the production of the Corolla Cross Hybrid, making it Toyota's first hybrid electric vehicle to be assembled in Pakistan.

In August 2024, Toyota Indus began exporting Corolla Cross, Hilux and Fortuner models to Oceanian countries.

== Financial performance ==
Indus Motor Company financial performance
| Year ended | Revenue (PKR million) | Operating income (PKR million) | Net income (PKR million) | Total assets (PKR million) | Total equity (PKR million) |
|---|---|---|---|---|---|
| 30 June 2010 | ▲60,093 | ▲5,386 | ▲3,443 | ▲27,138 | ▲12,588 |
| 30 June 2011 | ▲61,703 | ▼4,088 | ▼2,743 | ▼26,835 | ▲14,120 |
| 30 June 2012 | ▲76,963 | ▲6,374 | ▲4,303 | ▲27,576 | ▲17,014 |
| 30 June 2013 | ▼63,829 | ▼5,000 | ▼3,358 | ▼25,106 | ▲17,693 |
| 30 June 2014 | ▼57,064 | ▲5,055 | ▲3,873 | ▲26,111 | ▲19,916 |
| 30 June 2015 | ▲96,516 | ▲14,184 | ▲9,110 | ▲50,399 | ▲24,036 |
| 30 June 2016 | ▲108,759 | ▲17,397 | ▲11,455 | ▲57,537 | ▲27,630 |
| 30 June 2017 | ▲112,272 | ▲19,141 | ▲13,001 | ▲63,880 | ▲31,197 |
| 30 June 2018 | ▲140,208 | ▲22,999 | ▲15,772 | ▲81,927 | ▲36,744 |
| 30 June 2019 | ▲157,996 | ▼18,976 | ▼13,715 | ▼64,783 | ▲40,045 |
| 30 June 2020 | ▼86,167 | ▼7,287 | ▼5,082 | ▲80,279 | ▲41,169 |
| 30 June 2021 | ▲179,162 | ▲18,199 | ▲12,828 | ▲133,906 | ▲48,201 |
| 30 June 2022 | ▲275,506 | ▲25,453 | ▲15,802 | ▲213,965 | ▲54,011 |
| 30 June 2023 | ▼177,711 | ▼16,797 | ▼9,554 | ▼122,764 | ▲60,070 |
| 30 June 2024 | ▼152,481 | ▲23,327 | ▲15,072 | ▲145,820 | ▲67,226 |

== Products ==
Toyota Indus sells two different types of vehicles; complete knock-down kits (CKD) which are locally assembled at their plant in Karachi and completely built units (CBU) which are imported from the Toyota plants in Japan or Thailand, depending on the vehicle.

=== Locally assembled ===
- Toyota Yaris
- Toyota Corolla
- Toyota Corolla Cross
- Toyota Hilux
- Toyota Fortuner

=== Imports ===
- Toyota Camry Hybrid
- Toyota Land Cruiser
- Toyota Land Cruiser Prado
- Toyota HiAce
- Toyota Coaster

== See also ==
- List of automobile manufacturers
- Toyota Motor Corporation
- Toyota Tsusho Corporation
