= Deaths in March 2020 =

The following is a list of notable deaths in March 2020.

Entries for each day are listed alphabetically by surname. A typical entry lists information in the following sequence:

- Name, age, country of citizenship at birth, subsequent country of citizenship (if applicable), reason for notability, cause of death (if known), and reference.

== March 2020 ==
=== 1 ===
- István Balsai, 72, Hungarian jurist and politician, Minister of Justice (1990–1994), MP (1990–2011).
- Clara D. Bloomfield, 77, American physician and cancer researcher.
- Carsten Bresch, 98, German physicist and geneticist.
- Laura Caldwell, 52, American novelist and lawyer, breast cancer.
- Ernesto Cardenal, 95, Nicaraguan Roman Catholic priest and poet (The Gospel in Solentiname).
- John Currier, 68, American vice admiral, Vice Commandant of the United States Coast Guard (2012–2014).
- Sven Ivar Dysthe, 88, Norwegian furniture designer.
- Herbert Kasper, 93, American fashion designer.
- Jacques Lesourne, 91, French economist, director of Le Monde (1991–1994).
- Stefan Lindqvist, 52, Swedish footballer (Halmstad, IFK Göteborg, national team), amyotrophic lateral sclerosis.
- William MacEachern, 89, Canadian politician.
- Timothy Moynihan, 78, American politician, member of the Connecticut House of Representatives (1975–1986).
- Ndidi Nwosu, 40, Nigerian powerlifter, Paralympic champion (2016), lung infection.
- May Lorna O'Brien, 87, Australian educator and author.
- Andreas Papaemmanouil, 81, Greek footballer (Panathinaikos, national team).
- Siamand Rahman, 31, Iranian powerlifter, Paralympic champion (2012, 2016), heart attack.
- Marcel Roethlisberger, 90, Swiss art historian.
- Jim Sheets, 88, American politician.
- Jan Vyčítal, 77, Czech caricaturist and country music singer-songwriter.
- Jack Welch, 84, American business executive and chemical engineer, CEO of General Electric (1981–2001), kidney failure.

=== 2 ===
- Elizabeth Nelson Adams, 79, American artist and poet.
- Bahamian Bounty, 26, British racehorse and sire. (death announced on this date)
- Tabea Blumenschein, 67, German actress (Die Tödliche Doris) and painter.
- Trevor Braham, 97, British explorer and mountaineer.
- Rafael Cancel Miranda, 89, Puerto Rican independence leader and convicted attempted murderer (1954 United States Capitol shooting incident).
- Bob Christie, 94, Australian politician, member of the New South Wales Legislative Assembly (1981–1991).
- Henry N. Cobb, 93, American architect (Pei Cobb Freed & Partners).
- René Coicou, 84, Haitian-born Canadian politician, mayor of Gagnon (1973–1985).
- Roger Cooper, 80, New Zealand paleontologist, cancer.
- Ken Cowling, 72, American politician.
- Viktor Josef Dammertz, 90, German Roman Catholic prelate, Bishop of Augsburg (1993–2004).
- Charles E. Freeman, 86, American attorney and jurist, Justice (1990–2018) and Chief Justice (1997–2000) of the Supreme Court of Illinois.
- Evans Hayward, 98, American physicist, heart disease.
- Lance James, 81, South African singer.
- William Johnson, 88, Canadian journalist and author, president of Alliance Quebec (1998–2000).
- Yannis Katsafados, 84, Greek lawyer and politician, MP (1974–1981) and MEP (1981).
- Albie Keen, 84, British comedian (Hope and Keen).
- Sir Gavin Lightman, 80, English judge.
- James Lipton, 93, American television host (Inside the Actors Studio), actor (Arrested Development, Bolt) and writer (Guiding Light), bladder cancer.
- Peter Matthews, 91, British physiologist.
- Farrell McElgunn, 88, Irish politician, Senator (1969–1973), MEP (1973).
- Mohammad Mirmohammadi, 70, Iranian politician, member of the Expediency Discernment Council (since 2012), COVID-19.
- Barbara Neely, 78, American author (Blanche on the Lam).
- Vera Pless, 88, American mathematician.
- Joaquín Sánchez, 79, Colombian footballer (Deportivo Cali, national team).
- Vladimir Shuralyov, 84, Russian military officer, Deputy Minister of Defence (1990–1991), traffic collision.
- Virendra Singh Sirohi, 73, Indian politician.
- Tim Skelly, 69, American video game designer and programmer (Warrior, Rip Off, Reactor). (death announced on this date)
- Laird Stirling, 81, Canadian politician.
- Ulay, 76, German performance artist, cancer.
- Susan Weinert, 54, German guitarist.
- Peter Wieland, 89, German singer and entertainer.
- Suat Yalaz, 88, Turkish comic book artist (Karaoğlan).

=== 3 ===
- Božidar Alić, 65, Croatian actor (Operation Stadium, The Third Key, Long Dark Night).
- Bobbie Battista, 67, American journalist (CNN), cervical cancer.
- Réginald Bélair, 70, Canadian politician, MP (1988–2004).
- Alain Bertrand, 69, French politician, Senator (2011, since 2012) and mayor of Mende, Lozère (2008–2016).
- Minoru Betsuyaku, 82, Japanese writer, pneumonia.
- Roscoe Born, 69, American actor (One Life to Live, Santa Barbara, The Young and the Restless), suicide.
- CC, 18, American tabby cat, first cloned pet, kidney failure.
- Alf Cranner, 83, Norwegian folk singer.
- Michel Cullin, 75, French diplomat and writer.
- Freimut Duve, 83, German politician and author, MP (1980–1998).
- Tekla Famiglietti, 83, Italian nun, Abbess General of the Bridgettines (1981–2016).
- Georges Fontès, 95, French politician, MP (1986) and mayor of Béziers (1983–1989).
- Wendell Goler, 70, American journalist (Fox News), kidney failure.
- Stratis Haviaras, 84, Greek-American writer and poet.
- Madeline Held, 75, British academic.
- Jacob Hines, 92, American politician.
- Stanisław Kania, 92, Polish politician, First Secretary of the Polish United Workers' Party (1980–1981), pneumonia and heart failure.
- Suddhananda Mahathero, 87, Bangladeshi Buddhist monk and social worker.
- Selene Mahri, 95, Finnish-born American model.
- Kerry Marshall, 79, New Zealand politician, mayor of Richmond (1986–1989), Tasman (1989–1998), and Nelson (2007–2010).
- Günther Müller, 95, German conductor.
- Ahmad NikTalab, 85, Iranian poet, author, and linguist.
- János Petrenkó, 79, Hungarian industrialist and MP (1990–1994).
- Nicolas Portal, 40, French racing cyclist, sporting director of Team Sky (since 2013), heart attack.
- George Preti, 75, American organic chemist, bladder cancer.
- Harry Suhl, 97, German-born American physicist.
- Nicholas Tucci, 38, American actor (You're Next), cancer.
- Charles J. Urstadt, 91, American real estate executive and investor.
- David Wise, 65, American television writer (Teenage Mutant Ninja Turtles, The Transformers, Defenders of the Earth), lung cancer.

=== 4 ===
- Bandy Adams, 86, Australian rugby league player.
- Hesham Ashmawy, 41–42, Egyptian convicted terrorist, execution by hanging.
- David Barnes, 84, British industrialist.
- David Bentley, 84, British Anglican prelate, Bishop of Gloucester (1993–2003).
- Adelaide Chiozzo, 88, Brazilian actress and accordionist.
- Helen Courtney, 67, New Zealand cartoonist and illustrator.
- Serge Deslières, 72, Canadian politician.
- Eskandar Firouz, 93, Iranian environmentalist and politician.
- Amo Houghton, 93, American glass executive (Corning Inc.) and politician, member of the U.S. House of Representatives (1987–2005).
- Colin Kingsley, 94, British pianist.
- Ivan Lee, 63–64, Australian Anglican bishop, Bishop of the Western Region (2003–2019).
- Jacques Leibowitch, 77, French medical researcher.
- Barbara Martin, 76, American singer (The Supremes).
- Frank McLaughlin, 84, American comics artist (Judomaster, Gil Thorp).
- Úna O'Connor, 83, Irish camogie player (Dublin, Celtic).
- Jean Payne, 80, Canadian politician, MP (1993–1997).
- Javier Pérez de Cuéllar, 100, Peruvian diplomat and politician, Secretary-General of the United Nations (1982–1991), Prime Minister (2000–2001).
- Robert Shavlakadze, 86, Georgian high jumper, Olympic champion (1960).
- Alexey Sorokin, 97, Russian military officer and politician, Admiral of the Fleet (1988–1992) and Deputy (1989–1991).
- Alan Thornhill, 98, British artist and sculptor.
- Rosalind P. Walter, 95, American riveter and philanthropist, namesake of Rosie the Riveter.
- Bill Young, 88, Australian footballer (St Kilda).

=== 5 ===
- Katcho Achadjian, 68, American politician, member of the California State Assembly (2010–2016).
- Brian Astbury, 78, South African photographer and theatre director, heart attack.
- Yevgeny Barilovich, 87, Russian naval officer, Hero of the Soviet Union.
- Solomon Berewa, 81, Sierra Leonean politician, Vice-President (2002–2007).
- Edith L. Blumhofer, 69, American religious historian, cancer.
- Stanislav Bogdanovich, 27, Ukrainian chess grandmaster, nitrous oxide overdose.
- Emilio Caprile, 91, Italian footballer (Genoa, Juventus, national team).
- André Chéret, 82, French comic book artist (Rahan).
- Troy Collings, 33, New Zealand travel executive, heart attack. (death announced on this date)
- Lambros Comitas, 92, American anthropologist.
- Shirley Cowles, 80, New Zealand cricketer (national team).
- Edward Dyson, 100, British Olympic sailor (1952).
- Mary Fantasia, 100, American politician, Massachusetts state representative (1971–1978).
- Jeanette Fitzsimons, 75, New Zealand politician and environmentalist, co-leader of the Green Party (1995–2009) and MP (1996–2010), stroke.
- Sir Toby Frere, 81, British vice admiral, Chief of Fleet Support (1994–1997).
- Richard Hughes, 93, English cricketer (Worcestershire).
- Maggie King, 80, Welsh-born Australian actress (The Big Steal, The Saddle Club, Law of the Land).
- Gray Kunz, 65, Singaporean-born Swiss restaurateur, stroke.
- Susanna Majuri, 41, Finnish photographer.
- Marnie, 18, American Shih Tzu dog and social media celebrity.
- Prince Max Emanuel of Thurn and Taxis, 84, German royal.
- Levan Moseshvili, 79, Georgian basketball player, Olympic silver medalist (1964).
- Antonio Nardini, 98, Italian historian and author.
- Rip Oliver, 67, American professional wrestler (PNW), heart failure.
- Don Pavletich, 81, American baseball player (Cincinnati Reds).
- Antonio Permunian, 89, Swiss footballer (Bellinzona, Luzern, national team).
- Potturi Venkateswara Rao, 86, Indian Telugu journalist (Eenadu).
- Joe Reid, 90, American football player (Los Angeles Rams, Dallas Texans).
- Jean-Luc Seigle, 64, French dramatist and screenwriter (The Carriers Are Waiting), cardiac arrest.
- Hossein Sheikholeslam, 67, Iranian politician, MP (2004–2008) and Ambassador to Syria (1998–2003), COVID-19.
- Alejandro Sieveking, 85, Chilean playwright and theatre director.
- Jeff Taylor, 60, American basketball player (Texas Tech Red Raiders, Houston Rockets, Detroit Pistons). (death announced on this date)
- Michael Anthony Telesca, 90, American jurist, Judge (since 1982) and Chief Judge (1989–1995) of the U.S. District Court for Western New York.
- Ranka Velimirović, 79, Serbian film producer.
- Wanderley, 81, Brazilian footballer (Levante, Málaga, Hércules).
- Ray Wedgwood, 77, Australian engineer.

=== 6 ===
- Amanullah, 70, Pakistani actor (Khabarnaak, One Two Ka One, Na Maloom Afraad) and comedian, lung and kidney failure.
- Ralph Angel, 68, American writer.
- Khalid Mahmud Arif, 89, Pakistani military officer.
- Anne-Marie Berglund, 68, Finnish-born Swedish writer.
- Walter Bryan, 86, American football player (Baltimore Colts).
- Jack Buechner, 79, American politician, member of the Missouri (1973–1983) and U.S. (1987–1991) Houses of Representatives.
- Bélgica Castro, 99, Chilean actress (Little White Dove, Old Cats, La Recta Provincia).
- Christopher Collier, 90, American historian and author.
- Norm Fieldgate, 88, Canadian Hall of Fame football player (Regina Rams, BC Lions) and executive.
- Magdaleno Mercado, 75, Mexican footballer (Club Atlas, national team).
- David Paul, 62, American actor (The Barbarians, Double Trouble, Twin Sitters), television personality and bodybuilder.
- Henri Richard, 84, Canadian Hall of Fame ice hockey player (Montreal Canadiens), 11-time Stanley Cup champion.
- Clif Richardson, 75, American politician, Louisiana state representative (2008–2013).
- Elinor Ross, 93, American operatic soprano.
- Arnaldo de Oliveira Sales, 100, Hong Kong community leader, chairman of the Urban Council (1973–1981).
- Peter Smith, 76, English Roman Catholic prelate, Bishop of East Anglia (1995–2001), Archbishop of Cardiff (2001–2010) and Southwark (2010–2019), cancer.
- Silvia Smith, 80, Australian politician, MHR (Bass, 1993–1996), Parkinson's disease.
- Danny Tidwell, 35, American dancer and reality television contestant (So You Think You Can Dance), traffic collision.
- Tom Turnipseed, 83, American politician, member of the South Carolina Senate (1976–1980).
- McCoy Tyner, 81, American jazz pianist (Inception, The Real McCoy, Song for My Lady).
- Géza Ütő, 90, Hungarian Olympic rower (1956).
- Betty Weir, 95, American Olympic alpine skier (1952).
- Patrick Wright, Baron Wright of Richmond, 88, British diplomat and life peer.

=== 7 ===
- K. Anbazhagan, 97, Indian politician, MP (1962–1967) and MLA (1957–1962, 1971–1991, 1996–2011).
- Mart Crowley, 84, American playwright (The Boys in the Band), complications from heart surgery.
- William Benner Enright, 94, American jurist, Judge of the U.S. District Court for Southern California (since 1972).
- Susan Hammer, 81, American politician, Mayor of San Jose (1991–1999).
- Conway Hayman, 71, American football player (Houston Oilers).
- Karri Käyhkö, 82, Finnish Olympic swimmer (1956, 1960).
- Nelson Leirner, 88, Brazilian visual artist.
- John Manners, 105, English Royal Navy officer and cricketer (Hampshire, MCC).
- Jair Marinho, 83, Brazilian footballer (Fluminense, Corinthians, national team), World Cup winner (1962).
- Reza Mohammadi Langroudi, 91, Iranian ayatollah, COVID-19.
- Adamou Ndam Njoya, 77, Cameroonian author and politician, founder and president of the Cameroon Democratic Union (since 1991), mayor of Foumban (1996–2020).
- Robert M. Nerem, 82, American biomedical engineer.
- Jim Owen, 78, American country singer-songwriter.
- Kanakorn Pianchana, 50, Thai judge, suicide by gunshot.
- Earl Pomerantz, 75, Canadian-born American television writer and producer (Major Dad), aneurysm.
- Fatemeh Rahbar, 56, Iranian politician, MP (2004–2016), COVID-19.
- Boyce Richardson, 92, New Zealand-born Canadian journalist and filmmaker.
- Laura Smith, 67, Canadian folk singer-songwriter, cancer.
- Matthew Watkins, 41, Welsh rugby union player (Newport, Scarlets, national team), pelvic cancer.
- Houshang Zarif, 81, Iranian tar player, heart failure.

=== 8 ===
- Anders Åberg, 71, Swedish actor (Långt bort och nära, Kejsaren, Andra dansen).
- DeAndrey Abron, 47, American boxer, traffic collision.
- H. R. Bhardwaj, 82, Indian politician, Minister of Law and Justice (2004–2009), Governor of Karnataka (2009–2014) and Kerala (2012–2013), cardiac arrest.
- Billy Brennan, 86, Scottish ice hockey player.
- Wayne Bridges, 83, British professional wrestler (ASW).
- Molly Brodak, 39, American poet, suicide by gunshot.
- Ernest Davies, 93, British politician, MP (1966–1970).
- Martin Davorin-Jagodić, 84, Croatian composer.
- William Dawson, 92, American zoologist.
- Eremein, 18, Australian thoroughbred.
- Jan-Henrik Fredriksen, 63, Norwegian politician, MP (2005–2017).
- Coco Hotahota, 78–79, French Polynesian dancer and choreographer.
- Aileen S. Kraditor, 91, American historian.
- Challace McMillin, 77, American college football coach (James Madison Dukes).
- Markoosie Patsauq, 78, Canadian Inuk writer.
- Vijayan Pillai, 68, Indian politician, MLA (since 2016).
- Luis Racionero, 80, Spanish writer, Director of National Library (2001–2004).
- David Rogers, 64, American racing driver, Winston Racing Series champion (1994), complications from lymphoma.
- Salleh Ibrahim, 72, Malaysian footballer (Kelantan, Singapore FA, national team), liver disease.
- V. V. Veeder, 71-72, English barrister.
- Max von Sydow, 90, Swedish-born French actor (The Seventh Seal, The Exorcist, Pelle the Conqueror).
- Kano Yukimitsu, 87, Japanese judoka, President of the All Japan Judo Federation (1980–2009).
- Johnny Yune, 83, South Korean-American actor (They Call Me Bruce?, Nothing in Common, They Still Call Me Bruce) and comedian, cerebral hemorrhage.

=== 9 ===
- Donald A. Bailey, 74, American politician, member of the U.S. House of Representatives (1979–1983).
- John Bathersby, 83, Australian Roman Catholic prelate, Archbishop of Brisbane (1991–2011), Bishop of Cairns (1986–1991).
- Allen Bellman, 95, American comic book artist (Captain America).
- Nancy Brown, 77, American politician.
- Anton Coppola, 102, American orchestra conductor and composer.
- Italo De Zan, 94, Italian racing cyclist, COVID-19.
- Suleiman Dori, 42, Kenyan politician, MP (since 2013), cancer.
- Barney Eastwood, 87, Irish boxing promoter and bookmaker.
- Daniel S. Greenberg, 88, American journalist.
- Richard K. Guy, 103, British mathematician (Winning Ways for your Mathematical Plays, strong law of small numbers).
- José Jiménez Lozano, 89, Spanish writer, Miguel de Cervantes Prize winner (2002).
- Gary B. Kibbe, 79, American cinematographer (They Live, Escape from L.A., RoboCop 3).
- Lee Cha-su, 62, South Korean politician and activist, COVID-19.
- Alain Marcel, 68, Algerian-born French actor and music composer.
- Khitish Chandra Mondal, 80, Bangladeshi politician.
- Keith Olsen, 74, American record producer, sound engineer and musician (The Music Machine), cardiac arrest.
- John Havelock Parker, 91, Canadian politician, Mayor of Yellowknife (1964–1967) and Commissioner of the Northwest Territories (1979–1989).
- Lon Pennock, 74, Dutch sculptor, environmental artist and photographer.
- Mohammad-Reza Rahchamani, 67, Iranian physician and politician, MP (1984–2000), COVID-19.
- Dietmar Rothermund, 87, German historian.
- John Schneebichler, 61, Australian footballer (South Adelaide, Glenelg, South Australia), cancer.
- George Strachan, 87, Scottish cricketer (national team).
- Eric Taylor, 70, American folk singer-songwriter.
- Abdel Razak al-Yehiyeh, 90, Palestinian politician.

=== 10 ===
- Ruth Born, 94, American baseball player (South Bend Blue Sox).
- John M. Carpenter, 84, American nuclear engineer.
- Alessandro Criscuolo, 82, Italian jurist, President of the Constitutional Court (2014–2016).
- Charles B. Harris, 79, American physical chemist.
- Hyun Kil-un, 80, South Korean writer, cancer.
- John Seward Johnson II, 89, American sculptor and art impresario (Grounds for Sculpture), cancer.
- Erik Juárez Blanquet, 39, Mexican teacher and politician, Deputy (2015–2018, 2018), shot.
- Mohammad Kiavash, 89, Iranian politician, MP (1980–1988), COVID-19.
- Robert Langbaum, 96, American author.
- Kurt Liander, 88, Swedish footballer (AIK, IFK Stockholm, national team).
- Bill Linger, 88, Australian footballer.
- Bintou Malloum, 73, Chadian diplomat.
- Ted May, 70, American television director (Sesame Street, Elmo's World, Crank Yankers).
- Jane Myron, 69, American politician, mayor of Johnson City, Tennessee.
- George Otsuka, 82, Japanese jazz drummer.
- Marcelo Peralta, 59, Argentine saxophonist, COVID-19.
- Beba Selimović, 80, Bosnian sevdalinka singer.
- Mal Sharpe, 83, American television and radio personality, complications from heart surgery.
- Roberto Stella, 67, Italian physician, president of the National Interdisciplinary Medical Society of Primary Care, COVID-19.
- Sanford Wheeler, 49, Australian footballer (Sydney Swans).

=== 11 ===
- Didier Bezace, 74, French actor (The Little Thief, Les Voleurs, The Minister).
- Stefano Bianco, 34, Italian motorcycle racer, traffic collision.
- A. Richard Caputo, 81, American jurist, Judge of the U.S. District Court for Middle Pennsylvania (since 1997).
- Ted Cox, 65, American baseball player (Boston Red Sox, Cleveland Indians, Seattle Mariners), multiple myeloma.
- Gerard du Prie, 82, Dutch strongman and powerlifter, Strongest Man of the Netherlands (1979).
- Sir Rob Fenwick, 68, New Zealand environmentalist and businessman, cancer.
- József Gyuricza, 86, Hungarian fencer, Olympic bronze medallist (1956).
- Burkhard Hirsch, 89, German politician, minister of the NRW state government (1975–80) and member of the Bundestag (1972–1975, 1980–1998).
- Aarne Kainlauri, 104, Finnish Olympic steeplechaser (1948).
- Ken King, 68, Canadian businessman and sports executive (Calgary Flames), cancer.
- Irina Kirichenko, 82, Russian sprint cyclist.
- Paul Korda, 72, British musician, songwriter and actor.
- Whitney MacMillan, 90, American businessman (Cargill).
- Sebastião Roque Rabelo Mendes, 90, Brazilian prelate, Bishop of Leopoldina (1985–1989), Auxiliary Bishop of Belo Horizonte (1989–2004).
- Colin Mudie, 93, British yacht designer.
- Santu Mukherjee, 69, Indian actor (Harmonium, Swami Stree, Sanjhbati), cancer.
- Jarrod Patterson, 46, American baseball player (Detroit Tigers, Kansas City Royals), traffic collision.
- Tatyana Prorochenko, 67, Ukrainian athlete, Olympic champion (1980).
- Michel Roux, 78, French-born British chef and restaurateur (Le Gavroche, The Waterside Inn), idiopathic pulmonary fibrosis.
- Del Shofner, 85, American football player (Los Angeles Rams, New York Giants).
- Dave Souter, 79, Scottish footballer (Clyde, Dundee).
- Mohammed Tikly, 80, South African educator and struggle veteran.
- War Emblem, 21, American Thoroughbred racehorse, winner of the 2002 Kentucky Derby and 2002 Preakness Stakes.
- Charles Wuorinen, 81, American composer.

=== 12 ===
- Alexander Gordon, 7th Marquess of Aberdeen and Temair, 64, Scottish peer.
- Kevin Bacon, 87, Australian Olympic equestrian (1964, 1968, 1976).
- Verne L. Bowers, 100, American major general.
- Don Burrows, 91, Australian jazz musician.
- Jean-Michel Cambon, 68, French climber, climbing fall.
- Sir John Chalstrey, 88, British surgeon and civic leader, Lord Mayor of London (1995–1996).
- Jim Derrington, 80, American baseball player (Chicago White Sox).
- Ken Goodman, 92, American psycholinguist.
- Juha Harjula, 77, Finnish Olympic basketball player (1964).
- Mobio Besse Henri, 42, Ivorian boxer.
- Wolfgang Hofmann, 78, German judoka, Olympic silver medalist (1964).
- Sir John Lyons, 87, British linguist.
- Brendan Macken, 97, Canadian tennis player.
- Dorothy Maclean, 100, Canadian writer and educator.
- Tonie Marshall, 68, French actress (A Slightly Pregnant Man) and film director (Venus Beauty Institute, The Missionaries).
- Pete Mitchell, 61, English radio DJ and presenter (BBC Radio 2, Virgin Radio).
- Georgios Papavasileiou, 89, Greek Olympic runner (1956, 1960).
- Vincent Pepi, 93, American abstract expressionist painter.
- Giovanni Battista Rabino, 88, Italian politician, MP (1983–1994), COVID-19.
- Francisco Romãozinho, 76, Portuguese rally driver.
- Wallace Scobie, 86, Scottish footballer (Queen's Park).
- H. B. Tanner, 97, American politician.
- Danny Ray Thompson, 72, American jazz musician.
- Dimitrinka Todorova, 46, Bulgarian rhythmic gymnast, European team champion (1992).

=== 13 ===
- Menahem Ben, 71, Israeli poet, literary critic, and publicist (Haaretz, Maariv, Walla!), stroke.
- Alejandro Betts, 72, Argentine historian and political activist.
- Lucien Braun, 97, French historian and philosopher.
- Ivor Danvers, 87, English actor (Howards' Way).
- Ivan Davis, 82, Northern Irish politician, MLA (1998–2003).
- Arch Deal, 88, American television reporter (WFLA-TV), asphyxiation.
- René Follet, 88, Belgian illustrator, comics writer and artist.
- Barbara Harris, 89, American Episcopal prelate, suffragan bishop of Massachusetts (1989–2003).
- Kent Lawrence, 72, American football player (Philadelphia Eagles, Atlanta Falcons).
- Eugene Thomas Long, 84, American philosopher.
- Jim Mahaffey, 83, American bridge player.
- Givi Margvelashvili, 92, German-Georgian writer and philosopher.
- Douglas W. Mitchell, 66, American economist, complications from pancreatic cancer.
- Moon Deoksu, 91, South Korean poet.
- Filippos Petsalnikos, 69, Greek politician, Speaker of the Hellenic Parliament (2009–2012).
- Louise Robic, 85, Canadian politician, member of the National Assembly of Quebec (1985–1994).
- Nasser Shabani, 62–63, Iranian brigadier general (Revolutionary Guard), COVID-19.
- Breonna Taylor, 26, American victim of police shooting, shot.
- Mart Ummelas, 66, Estonian journalist.
- Yang Mu, 79, Taiwanese poet and essayist.
- Dana Zátopková, 97, Czech javelin thrower, Olympic champion (1952).

=== 14 ===
- Ofer Bar-Yosef, 82, Israeli archaeologist and anthropologist.
- Gustavo Bebianno, 56, Brazilian lawyer and politician, President of the Social Liberal Party (2018), heart attack.
- Archie R. Clemins, 76, American admiral.
- Mariano Puga Concha, 88, Chilean Roman Catholic priest and human rights activist, opponent of the military dictatorship.
- Doriot Anthony Dwyer, 98, American flutist.
- Alan Fanning, 87, Australian footballer (Hawthorn).
- Jon Atle Gaarder, 85, Norwegian diplomat, ambassador to Saudi Arabia (1984–1990), India (1990–1994) and Lithuania (1999–2001).
- Giancarlo Ghironzi, 88, Sammarinese politician, Captain Regent (1961, 1969–1970).
- Cecil Gray, 97, Trinidadian-born Canadian poet.
- Mubashir Hassan, 98, Pakistani politician, Minister of Finance (1971–1974).
- Galen Head, 72, Canadian ice hockey player (Detroit Red Wings).
- Milan Kubala, 73, Czech Paralympic athlete, silver (1996) and gold (2000, 2004) medallist.
- Tamaki Nakanishi, 44, Japanese voice actress (Accel World, Gad Guard, I"s).
- Phil Phillips, 94, American singer and songwriter ("Sea of Love").
- John L. Pickitt, 86, American lieutenant general.
- Eva Pilarová, 80, Czech singer.
- Genesis P-Orridge, 70, English musician (Throbbing Gristle, Psychic TV) and performance artist (COUM Transmissions), leukaemia.
- Puthussery Ramachandran, 91, Indian poet.
- Diane Ray, 74, American singer.
- Chris Reed, 30, American-born Japanese figure skater, cardiac arrest.
- Piero Schlesinger, 89, Italian jurist and banker, COVID-19.
- Howard Barham Singleton, 92, Canadian diplomat.
- Henry Smith, 64, Samoan Olympic athlete (1984, 1988).
- Nihal Yeğinobalı, 92, Turkish novelist and translator.

=== 15 ===
- Mohammad Ami-Tehrani, 84, Iranian Olympic weightlifter (1960).
- Savenaca Aria, 55, Fijian rugby player (national team, Nawaka).
- Charles Atger, 98, French pilot.
- Gilbert Espinosa Chávez, 87, American Roman Catholic prelate, Auxiliary Bishop of San Diego (1974–2007).
- Chong Hon Nyan, 95, Malaysian politician, Minister of Health (1978–1982).
- Boyce G. Clayton, 90, American jurist, Justice of the Kentucky Court of Appeals (1975–1976) and Supreme Court (1976–1983).
- Suzy Delair, 102, French actress (Quai des Orfèvres, Atoll K, The Murderer Lives at Number 21).
- Aleksandr Nikolayevich Denisov, 65, Russian military officer.
- Jean Dufour, 70, French politician, Deputy (2001–2002).
- Manfred Feiler, 94, German painter.
- Vittorio Gregotti, 92, Italian architect, COVID-19.
- Richard L. Hanna, 69, American politician, member of the U.S. House of Representatives (2011–2017), cancer.
- Roy Hudd, 83, English actor (The Blood Beast Terror, Up the Chastity Belt, Coronation Street) and comedian.
- Wolf Kahn, 92, German-born American artist, heart failure.
- Tony Lewis, 78, English mathematician, co-inventor of cricket's Duckworth–Lewis–Stern method.
- Pilar Luna, 75, Mexican underwater archaeologist.
- Olvi L. Mangasarian, 86, Iraqi-born American mathematician.
- Jeremy Marre, 76, English filmmaker.
- Jack McNelly, 70, American curler.
- Mick Morris, 77, English footballer (Oxford United, Port Vale, Stafford Rangers).
- Ning Jinsheng, 87, Chinese engineer, member of Chinese Academy of Engineering.
- Phil Olsen, 63, Canadian javelin thrower, Commonwealth Games champion (1978), heart attack.
- Mark Perrow, 55, South African Olympic sprint canoer (1992), plane crash.
- Wiesław Rosocha, 74, Polish illustrator and graphic designer.
- Iftikhar Hussain Shah, 71, Pakistani military officer and politician, Governor of Khyber Pakhtunkhwa (2000–2005), heart attack.
- Jeff Stabins, 60, American politician, member of the Florida House of Representatives (1992–1998).
- Aytaç Yalman, 79, Turkish military officer, General Commander of the Gendarmerie (2000–2002) and Commander of the Army (2002–2004), COVID-19.

=== 16 ===
- Nicolas Alfonsi, 83, French politician, MP (1973–1988, 2001–2014) and MEP (1981–1984), COVID-19.
- Lynford Anderson, 78, Jamaican-born American music engineer and producer.
- Jim Bartko, 54, American college athletics administrator (Fresno State).
- Sergio Bassi, 68, Italian folk singer-songwriter, COVID-19.
- David Briggs, 102, English educator, headmaster of King's College School, Cambridge (1959–1977).
- Menachem Friedman, 83, Israeli sociologist.
- Ranveig Frøiland, 74, Norwegian politician, Minister of Petroleum and Energy (1997).
- Hashem Bathaie Golpayegani, 78–79, Iranian ayatollah, member of the Assembly of Experts (since 2016), COVID-19.
- Ralph Gomes, 82, Guyanese-born American track and field athlete.
- François Hilsum, 91, French political activist and writer.
- Karl Hoffmann, 84, German Olympic footballer (1956).
- Slobodan Kićović, 78, Montenegrin Olympic swimmer (1960).
- Hanna Laursen, 83, Danish Olympic diver.
- Carlos Mejia, 62, Colombian Olympic boxer.
- Jan Levor Njargel, 76, Norwegian politician.
- Francesco Saverio Pavone, 75, Italian magistrate, COVID-19.
- Saskia Post, 59, American-born Australian actress (Dogs in Space).
- Patil Puttappa, 99, Indian writer and journalist, complications from brain surgery.
- Fariborz Raisdana, 75, Iranian economist, COVID-19.
- Adam Showman, 51, American planetary scientist.
- Stuart Whitman, 92, American actor (The Mark, The Comancheros, Those Magnificent Men in their Flying Machines), skin cancer.
- Susan R. Wilson, 71, Australian statistician, metastatic cancer.
- Hank Workman, 94, American baseball player (New York Yankees).

=== 17 ===
- Vittoria Bogo Deledda, 53, Italian politician, Senator (since 2018), cancer.
- Michael Broadbent, 92, British wine critic, auctioneer and writer.
- Flossie M. Byrd, 92, American home economist.
- Janet Carr, 92, English psychologist.
- Horst Felbermayr, 75, Austrian industrialist and amateur racing driver.
- Gerald Freedman, 92, American theatre director, librettist and lyricist.
- Syed Mumtaz Alam Gillani, 80, Pakistani lawyer and politician, MP (2008).
- Sarah Gorelick, 88, American pilot.
- Jérôme Hanquez, 46, French tennis player.
- G. Rama Iyer, 88, Malaysian politician.
- Piotr Jegor, 51, Polish footballer (Górnik Zabrze, Odra Wodzisław Śląski, national team).
- Frank Kapral, 91, American football and wrestling coach.
- Tadashi Kato, 85, Japanese Olympic cyclist (1952).
- Michel Kitabdjian, 89, French football referee.
- Jairam Kulkarni, 87, Indian actor (Dhoom Dhadaka, Gammat Jammat, Thartharat).
- Eduard Limonov, 77, Russian writer, poet and political dissident, complications from surgery.
- Roger Mayweather, 58, American boxer and boxing trainer, WBA super featherweight (1983–1984) and WBC super lightweight champion (1987–1989).
- Bill McPherson, 88, American football coach (Santa Clara University, Philadelphia Eagles, San Francisco 49ers).
- Meng Sufen, 87, Chinese politician.
- Manuel Serifo Nhamadjo, 61, Bissau-Guinean politician, Acting President of the National People's Assembly (2009, 2012) and Acting President (2012–2014).
- Patrick Nothomb, 83, Belgian diplomat, heart attack.
- Keiji Ogushi, 85, Japanese hurdler, pneumonia.
- William Outten, 71, American politician, member of the Delaware House of Representatives (2005–2019).
- Arvo Sarapuu, 66, Estonian politician, Deputy Mayor of Tallinn (2011–2017), County Governor of Järva County (1989–1997).
- Stephen Schwartz, 78, American pathologist (University of Washington), COVID-19.
- Thái Thanh, 85, Vietnamese-American singer.
- Leonidas Veliaroutis, 103, Greek writer.
- Lyle Waggoner, 84, American actor (The Carol Burnett Show, Wonder Woman, Love Me Deadly), cancer.
- Geoffrey Wainwright, 80, British theologian.
- Jack Webster, 88, Scottish journalist, complications from Alzheimer's disease.
- Betty Williams, 76, Northern Irish political activist, Nobel Prize laureate (1976).
- Malcolm Yardley, 79, British Olympic sprinter (1960).

=== 18 ===
- Kathleen Appler, 68, American Roman Catholic nun, Superior General of Daughters of Charity (since 2015) and member of Congregation for Institutes of Consecrated Life and Societies of Apostolic Life (since 2019).
- Al Tayeb Abdul Rahim, 75–76, Palestinian politician.
- Richard G. Austin, 89, American weightlifter, complications from diabetes.
- David Bowker, 98, British sailor, Olympic silver medalist (1956).
- Christopher Butler, 79–80, English literature academic.
- Rose Marie Compaoré, 61, Burkinabé politician, 2nd vice president of the National Assembly (since 2015), COVID-19.
- Brownlee O. Currey Jr., 91, American financier, philanthropist and newspaper publisher, owner and CEO of the Nashville Banner.
- Mark H. A. Davis, 74, British mathematician.
- Wray Downes, 89, Canadian jazz pianist.
- Erwin Drèze, 59, Belgian comic book artist, brain cancer.
- Patrick J. Duggan, 86, American jurist, Judge of the U.S. District Court for Eastern Michigan (since 1986).
- John E. Erickson, 92, American basketball coach (Wisconsin Badgers), general manager (Milwaukee Bucks) and politician.
- Luciano Federici, 81, Italian footballer (Cosenza Calcio, A.C. Pisa 1909), COVID-19.
- Joe Ferebee, 101, American baseball coach (Pfeiffer University).
- Rudi Georgi, 92, German politician, member of the Council of Ministers of East Germany (1973–1989).
- Yoine Goldstein, 85, Canadian academic, lawyer and senator.
- Jerome H. Granrud, 82, American lieutenant general.
- Catherine Hamlin, 96, Australian physician and philanthropist, co-founder of the Addis Ababa Fistula Hospital.
- Reika Iwami, 92–93, Japanese woodblock printmaker.
- Suzanne Jacobs, 83, American politician.
- Syed Shahidul Huque Jamal, 76, Bangladeshi politician, member of the Jatiya Sangsad.
- Kenneth Kafui, 68, Ghanaian composer.
- Emil Karewicz, 97, Polish actor (Stawka większa niż życie, How I Unleashed World War II, Knights of the Teutonic Order).
- Howie Landa, 88, American basketball player and coach.
- Patrick Le Lay, 77, French engineer and businessman (TF1, Bouygues).
- Miranda Macmillan, 72, British socialite and model, pancreatic cancer.
- Patricia Moody, 85, British Olympic sprint canoer.
- Moon Ji-yoon, 36, South Korean actor, sepsis.
- Peter Musevski, 54, Slovenian actor (Bread and Milk, Spare Parts, Slovenian Girl).
- Bob Myers, 89, Australian footballer (St Kilda).
- George O'Brien, 84, Scottish footballer (Southampton, Dunfermline Athletic, Leeds United).
- Joaquín Peiró, 84, Spanish football player (Atlético Madrid, Roma, national team) and manager.
- Francisco Peralta, 76, Spanish Olympic archer (1980).
- Raviraaj, 77, Indian actor (Achanak, Ek Chitthi Pyar Bhari).
- Henri Richelet, 75, French painter, COVID-19.
- Om Bhakta Shrestha, 86, Nepalese judge, Chief Justice of Nepal (1997–1998).
- John Solomon, 90, Australian rugby union player (New South Wales Waratahs, national team).
- Kevin Taylor, 72, English rugby league footballer (Oldham, Leigh Centurions, national team). (body discovered on this date)
- Sir John Tooley, 95, British opera administrator, general director of the Royal Opera House (1970–1988).
- Sérgio Trindade, 79, Brazilian scientist (IPCC), COVID-19.
- William Alfred Weber, 101, American botanist and lichenologist.
- Thomas A. Wiseman Jr., 89, American jurist, Tennessee state representative (1964–1968), State Treasurer (1971–1974) and Judge (1978–1995) and Chief Judge (1984–1991) of the M.D. Tenn.
- Alfred Worden, 88, American astronaut who orbited the Moon on Apollo 15, stroke.

=== 19 ===
- Román Arámbula, 83, Mexican comic-book and storyboard artist (Mickey Mouse), heart attack.
- Harlan Cohen, 85, American volleyball coach, US men's and women's national teams.
- Peter Davies, 92, British economic historian.
- Enrico Decleva, 78, Italian historian, Rector of the University of Milan (2001–2012).
- François Dermaut, 70, French comic book artist.
- Innocenzo Donina, 69, Italian footballer (Reggio Audace, Atalanta, Bari), COVID-19.
- Max Engman, 74, Finnish historian and translator.
- Camille Fischbach, 87, French footballer (Olympique de Marseille, FC Metz).
- Clark Gaudin, 88, American politician.
- James B. Jacobs, 72, American criminologist.
- Hamid Kahram, 62, Iranian politician, MP (2000–2004), COVID-19.
- Patrick Kirschman, 65, American politician, South Dakota state representative (2009–2017).
- Hans Knudsen, 75, Danish Olympic sprint canoer (1964, 1968).
- Lê Minh Đảo, 87, Vietnamese soldier, major general of South Vietnam.
- Li Daozeng, 90, Chinese architect, member of Chinese Academy of Engineering.
- Aurlus Mabélé, 66, Congolese singer and composer, stroke and COVID-19.
- Benny Malone, 68, American football player (Miami Dolphins, Washington Redskins), complications from diabetes.
- Herbert Marx, 88, Canadian lawyer and politician, MNA (1979–1989).
- Jim Mattos, 88, American politician.
- Don McGuire, American television executive, heart attack.
- Sir Anthony Pigott, 75, British lieutenant general, Deputy Chief of the Defence Staff (2000–2003).
- Oliver Lee Pitts, 103, American journalist (Fort Worth Telegram) and restaurateur (White Horse Tavern).
- Raymond Renard, 95, Belgian writer and linguist.
- W. J. Rorabaugh, 74, American historian.
- Ashraf Siddiqui, 93, Bangladeshi poet.
- Antonio Michele Stanca, 77, Italian geneticist, COVID-19.
- Richard Tracey, 77, British politician, MP (1983–1997).
- Sir Peter Viggers, 82, British politician, MP (1974–2010).
- Peter Whittingham, 35, English footballer (Cardiff City, Aston Villa, Blackburn Rovers), complications of traumatic brain injury.
- Bob Wilkinson, 80, English cricketer (Kent).
- John Young, 82, English rugby union player (national team).
- Nazzareno Zamperla, 82, Italian actor (Samson and the Slave Queen, A Pistol for Ringo, Three Tough Guys) and stuntman.
- Edi Ziegler, 90, German road racing cyclist, Olympic bronze medallist (1952).

=== 20 ===
- Mark Andrews, 60, British rower.
- P. K. Banerjee, 83, Indian football player (Aryan, Eastern Railway, national team) and manager, heart attack.
- Susham Bedi, 74, Indian writer and academic.
- Cengiz Bektaş, 85, Turkish architect (Mertim) and writer, heart failure.
- Claude Bennett, 83, Canadian politician, MPP (1971–1987).
- Harry van den Bergh, 77, Dutch politician, MP (1977–1987).
- Denise Bradley, 77, Australian academic administrator.
- Amadeo Carrizo, 93, Argentine footballer (River Plate, Millonarios, national team).
- Belarmino Correa Yepes, 89, Colombian Roman Catholic prelate, Bishop of San José del Guaviare (1999–2006).
- Allah Ditta, 87, Pakistani Olympic athlete (1956, 1960).
- Carlos Falcó, 5th Marquess of Griñón, 83, Spanish nobleman, socialite and entrepreneur, Grandee of Spain, COVID-19.
- Carole Finer, 83, English radio presenter and artist, COVID-19.
- Victor Fotso, 93, Cameroonian politician and businessman, Mayor of Bandjoun (since 1996).
- K. J. George, 85, Indian politician, MLA (1977–1980, 1987–1994).
- Johnny Harris, 87, Scottish composer and arranger, lung cancer.
- Willigis Jäger, 95, German Benedictine monk and Zen master.
- Shapi Kaziev, 63, Russian writer and playwright.
- Werner Lorenz, 83, German ice hockey player (Adler Mannheim).
- Ali Habib Mahmud, 81, Syrian military officer, Chief of Staff (2004–2009) and Minister of Defense (2009–2011).
- Don Manning, 52, American politician, member of the Ohio House of Representatives (since 2019).
- Justin Mulenga, 65, Zambian Roman Catholic prelate, Bishop of Mpika (since 2015).
- Muhterem Nur, 87, Turkish actress and singer.
- Enrique del Portal, 87, Spanish operatic tenor, gastroenteritis.
- Marino Quaresimin, 82, Italian politician, Mayor of Vicenza (1995–1998), COVID-19.
- Kenny Rogers, 81, American Hall of Fame singer ("The Gambler", "Just Dropped In", "Islands in the Stream"), songwriter and actor.
- Giovanni Romanini, 74, Italian comics artist and cartoonist (Satanik, Diabolik, Alan Ford), heart attack.
- Jean-Marie Saget, 91, French military pilot.
- Robert H. Scarborough, 97, American vice admiral.
- Vladimir Shtapov, 73, Russian football player (Dynamo Moscow, Torpedo Moscow) and manager (Khimki).
- Harkishan Singh, 91, Indian pharmaceutical scientist.
- Borislav Stanković, 94, Serbian Hall of Fame basketball player (Partizan) and coach (OKK Beograd, Cantù), Secretary General of FIBA (1976–2003).
- Bob Stephenson, 91, American baseball player (St. Louis Cardinals).
- Hans Stoll, 80, German-born American economist.
- Mikhail Voloshin, 66, Romanian-born American theoretical physicist, heart failure.
- Gino Volpe, 77, Italian singer-songwriter, heart attack.
- Vladimír Zábrodský, 97, Czech Hall of Fame ice hockey player (LTC Prague, HC Sparta Praha, Bohemians 1905), world champion (1947, 1949) and Olympic silver medallist (1948).

=== 21 ===
- Nicholas Allen, 80, English physician and social anthropologist.
- Marguerite Aucouturier, 87, Czech-born French psychoanalyst and translator, COVID-19.
- Balasingam Singaram, 72, Malaysian Olympic field hockey player (1972, 1976).
- Aileen Baviera, 60, Filipino academic, COVID-19.
- Dov Ben-Meir, 92, Israeli politician, member of the Knesset (1981–1988).
- Dmitri Bruns, 91, Latvian-born Soviet and Estonian architect.
- Vicenç Capdevila, 83, Spanish lawyer and politician, mayor of Hospitalet de Llobregat (1973–1977) and Deputy (1977–1979), COVID-19.
- Geoff Denial, 88, English footballer (Oxford United, Sheffield Town).
- Ted Graham, Baron Graham of Edmonton, 94, British politician, member of Parliament (1974–1983) and the House of Lords (since 1983), Lord Commissioner of the Treasury (1976–1979).
- B. G. Hendrix, 97, American politician, member (1962–1996) and Speaker (1989–1991) of the Arkansas House of Representatives.
- Atsushi Ii, 81, Japanese voice actor (Saikano, Kingdom Hearts Birth by Sleep, Berserk).
- Eldred D. Jones, 95, Sierra Leonean literary critic.
- Moriyuki Kato, 85, Japanese politician, Governor of Ehime (1999–2010).
- Sol Kerzner, 84, South African hotelier, founder of Southern Sun Hotel Group and Sun International, cancer.
- Robert Klapisch, 87, French physicist.
- Richard S. Kline, 79, American television producer and director.
- Alain Macle, 75, French Olympic ski jumper (1968, 1972).
- Ray Mantilla, 85, American percussionist, complications from lymphoma.
- Hiroshi Masuoka, 83, Japanese voice actor (Sazae-san, Anpanman, Dragon Ball Z), rectal cancer.
- James McLernon, 92, American automobile executive.
- Mariko Miyagi, 93, Japanese actress (Panda and the Magic Serpent, Ten Dark Women, Barefoot Gen) and singer, lymphoma.
- Pasqualino Morbidelli, 71, Italian Olympic boxer (1972).
- Gianni Mura, 74, Italian journalist, heart attack.
- Jacques Oudin, 80, French politician, Senator (1986–2004), COVID-19.
- Piotr Pawlukiewicz, 59, Polish Roman Catholic priest.
- Soundaraj Periyanayagam, 70, Indian Roman Catholic prelate, Bishop of Vellore (since 2006).
- Annar Petersen, 88, Norwegian Olympic ice hockey player (1952).
- Anthony Procter, 76, South African cricketer (Natal).
- Jean-Jacques Razafindranazy, 68, Madagascar-born French doctor, COVID-19.
- Elisabeth Sanders, 74, American politician.
- Otto F. Sankey, 69, American physicist, cancer.
- Lorenzo Sanz, 76, Spanish sports administrator, president of Real Madrid (1995–2000), COVID-19.
- Bill Saylor, 90, American broadcaster, aneurysm.
- Hellmut Stern, 91, German violinist.
- William Stern, 84, Hungarian-born British businessman, COVID-19.
- Pierre Truche, 90, French magistrate (the trial of Klaus Barbie), cancer.
- Leroy Wright, 82, American basketball player (Wilkes-Barre Barons, Pittsburgh Pipers).
- Yitzhak Yamin, 81–82, Iraqi-born Israeli painter and sculptor.

=== 22 ===
- Alberto Arbasino, 90, Italian novelist, essayist and politician, Deputy (1983–1987).
- Petru Bogatu, 68, Moldovan journalist and writer, cancer.
- Dean Borg, 81, American journalist, complications from pancreatic cancer.
- Gene Brown, 84, American basketball player (San Francisco Dons).
- William A. Cassidy, 92, American geologist, heart attack.
- Vid Cencic, 86, Uruguayan Olympic cyclist.
- Branko Cikatić, 64, Croatian heavyweight kickboxer, K-1 World Grand Prix champion (1993).
- Germà Colón, 91, Spanish philologist, COVID-19.
- Gabi Delgado-López, 61, Spanish-born German musician (Deutsch Amerikanische Freundschaft).
- Julie Felix, 81, American-British folk singer.
- Ciprian Foias, 86, Romanian mathematician.
- Ifeanyi George, 26, Nigerian footballer (Enyimba, national team), traffic collision.
- Jimmy Henley, 56, American banjo player, throat cancer.
- John Henn, 78, American Olympic volleyball player (1968) and coach (San Diego State Aztecs), National Champion (1973), cancer.
- Máximo Hernández, 74, Spanish football player (Rayo Vallecano, Sporting de Gijón) and manager (Getafe Deportivo).
- Benito Joanet, 84, Spanish football player (RCD Espanyol, Real Zaragoza) and coach (RCD Espanyol, RCD Mallorca), COVID-19.
- Jack Krumpe, 84, American sports executive.
- Serena Liu, 44, Taiwanese dancer and actress (How Much Sorrow Do You Have, The Rise of the Tang Empire), complications from heart surgery.
- José María Loizaga Viguri, 83, Spanish businessman, vice-president of ACS Group, COVID-19.
- Mike Longo, 83, American jazz pianist, COVID-19.
- George Lovelace, 83, American army officer and politician, member of the Virginia House of Delegates (1996–1998), lung cancer.
- Carmen de Mairena, 87, Spanish actress, cuplé singer and television personality.
- Richard Marek, 86, American editor, esophageal cancer.
- Bob McCullough, 76, New Zealand cricketer (Wellington).
- Vintilă Mihăilescu, 68, Romanian anthropologist, leukemia.
- James Martin Munley, 83, American jurist, Judge of the U.S. District Court for Middle Pennsylvania (since 1998).
- Daniel Edward Pilarczyk, 85, American Roman Catholic prelate, Archbishop of Cincinnati (1982–2009), president of the U.S. Conference of Catholic Bishops (1989–1992).
- Pasquale Russo Maresca, 51, Italian painter.
- Markvard Sellevoll, 96, Norwegian geophysicist.
- Richard Sharpe, 66, British historian and academic.
- Peter Stapleton, 65, New Zealand musician (The Terminals, Dadamah, Flies Inside the Sun).
- Ronnie Thompson, 85, American politician, Mayor of Macon, Georgia (1967–1975).
- Visu, 74, Indian film director (Samsaram Adhu Minsaram, Thirumathi Oru Vegumathi, Pattukottai Periyappa), writer and actor.
- Stuart Warren, 81, British organic chemist and author.
- Eric Weissberg, 80, American folk musician ("Dueling Banjos", The Tarriers), Alzheimer's disease.
- Woody Widenhofer, 77, American football coach (Pittsburgh Steelers, Detroit Lions, Cleveland Browns), stroke.
- Mikhail Yudin, 44, Russian footballer (FC Metallurg Lipetsk, FC Arsenal Tula), stroke.
- Sultana Zaman, 87, Bangladeshi psychologist.
- Jürg Zeltner, 52, Swiss banking executive (KBL), brain tumor.

=== 23 ===
- Maurice Berger, 63, American cultural historian, curator, and art critic, COVID-19.
- Lucia Bosè, 89, Italian actress (No Peace Under the Olive Tree, Story of a Love Affair, Rome 11:00), Miss Italia (1947), COVID-19.
- Carole Brookins, 76, American stockbroker, COVID-19.
- John Butman, 69, American writer.
- Carlo Casini, 85, Italian politician, Deputy (1979–1994) and MEP (1984–1999, 2006–2014), amyotrophic lateral sclerosis.
- Llorenç Cassi, 79, Spanish athlete and coach, COVID-19.
- Harry Chadwick, 92, Canadian politician.
- David Collings, 79, British actor (Scrooge, The Thirty Nine Steps, The Invisible Woman).
- Alfio Contini, 92, Italian cinematographer (Zabriskie Point, The Night Porter, Ripley's Game).
- Brian Crowe, 82, British diplomat, Ambassador to Austria (1989–1992), COVID-19.
- Maurice Delbez, 97, French film director (Dans l'eau qui fait des bulles).
- Borja Domecq Solís, 74, Spanish fighting bulls breeder, COVID-19.
- José Folgado, 75, Spanish businessman and politician, president of Red Eléctrica de España (2012–2018), Deputy (2000, 2004–2008) and mayor of Tres Cantos (2007–2012), COVID-19.
- Apple Gabriel, 64, Jamaican reggae singer (Israel Vibration).
- José García González, 81, Spanish psychiatrist and neurologist.
- Tristan Garel-Jones, 79, British politician, MP (1979–1997), Minister for Europe (1990–1993) and Treasurer of the Household (1989–1990).
- Nora Illi, 35, Swiss Muslim activist and preacher, breast cancer.
- Peter Jackson, 91, British politician, MP (1966–1970).
- Burhanuddin Khan Jahangir, 84, Bangladeshi academic and writer.
- Paul Karslake, 61, British painter, COVID-19.
- Nanette L. Laitman, 95, American art collector and philanthropist.
- Robert E. Lavender, 93, American judge, Justice (1965–2007) and Chief Justice (1979–1981) of the Oklahoma Supreme Court.
- Anastasio López Ramírez, 63, Spanish politician, member of the Cortes of Castilla-La Mancha (1983–1995) and mayor of Alcázar de San Juan (1987–1995), COVID-19.
- Pyotr Lysenko, 88, Belarusian archaeologist.
- Zororo Makamba, 30, Zimbabwean television journalist, COVID-19.
- Ron Marciniak, 87, American football player (Washington Redskins), coach (Dayton Flyers) and scout.
- Alan Ortiz, 66, Filipino business executive and journalist, COVID-19.
- Silvano Pravisano, 95, Italian footballer (Udinese, Genoa).
- Keith Remington, 96, Australian politician, member of the Victorian Legislative Assembly (1977–1988).
- Usama Riaz, 26, Pakistani physician, COVID-19.
- Tony Ribaudo, 78, American politician, member of the Missouri House of Representatives (1977–1997), lung cancer.
- Calogero Rizzuto, 65, Italian architect and historic preservationist, COVID-19.
- Walter Robb, 91, American engineer and R&D executive (General Electric), owner of Albany River Rats (1998–2010), COVID-19.
- Mary Roman, 84, American Senior Olympics athlete, COVID-19.
- Lucien Sève, 93, French philosopher and political activist (French Communist Party), COVID-19.
- JR Shaw, 85, Canadian telecommunications (Shaw Communications) and mass media executive (Corus Entertainment).
- Júlia Sigmond, 90, Hungarian-Romanian puppet actress, COVID-19.
- Stanley Sporkin, 88, American jurist, Judge of the U.S. District Court for the District of Columbia (1985–2000), heart failure.
- Farzaneh Taidi, 74, Iranian actress (Not Without My Daughter).
- Giles Walker, 74, Scottish-born Canadian film and television director (Bravery in the Field ,Never Too Late, Fries with That?).
- Idelle Weber, 88, American artist.
- Danta Whitaker, 56, American football player (Kansas City Chiefs, Minnesota Vikings, Chicago Bears).
- Nashom Wooden, 50, American drag performer (The Ones, Flawless, Swoon), COVID-19.
- Hassie Young, 96, Canadian ice hockey player (Edmonton Mercurys).
- Valery Zhuravko, 72, Soviet-Ukrainian association football player (FC Sirius Zhovti Vody, MFC Mykolaiv) and coach (FC Artania Ochakiv).

=== 24 ===
- Lorenzo Acquarone, 89, Italian lawyer and politician, MP (1987–2006), COVID-19.
- Nihat Akbay, 75, Turkish footballer (Galatasaray).
- Ivan Bokyi, 78, Ukrainian politician, member of the Verkhovna Rada (1998–2007).
- John Campbell-Jones, 90, British Formula One driver.
- Antonio Cerroni, 95, Italian Olympic wrestler.
- Romi Cohn, 91, Czechoslovak-born American rabbi, real estate developer and Holocaust survivor, COVID-19.
- Hugh Conaghan, 93, Irish politician, TD (1977–1989).
- Pierluigi Consonni, 71, Italian footballer (S.S.C. Bari), COVID-19.
- Giuseppe Covre, 69, Italian businessman, writer and politician, Deputy (1996–2001), complications from a fall.
- John Davies, 90, Australian-born American swimmer and jurist, Olympic champion (1952), Judge of the U.S. District Court for Central California (1986–1998), cancer.
- Manu Dibango, 86, Cameroonian saxophonist ("Soul Makossa"), COVID-19.
- George Dickie, 93, American philosopher.
- William Dufris, 62, American voice actor (Bob the Builder), cancer.
- David Edwards, 48, American basketball player, COVID-19.
- John Eriksson, 91, Swedish footballer (Djurgården, national team).
- Mohamed Farah, 59, Somali footballer (national team), COVID-19.
- Melinda O. Fee, 77, American actress (Days of Our Lives, The Invisible Man, A Nightmare on Elm Street 2: Freddy's Revenge).
- Alan Finder, 72, American journalist (The New York Times), COVID-19.
- Paul Goma, 84, Romanian writer, COVID-19.
- Alfred Gomolka, 77, German politician, MEP (1994–2009).
- Stuart Gordon, 72, American film director (Re-Animator, From Beyond, Dagon), multiple organ failure.
- David Greetham, 78, American literary critic.
- E. Harikumar, 76, Indian novelist.
- Donald Howarth, 88, English playwright and theatre director.
- Jack Jones, 95, Australian footballer (Essendon), cancer.
- Ian Reay Mackay, 98, Australian immunologist.
- Sterling Maddox, 78, American politician, member of the Maryland House of Delegates (1971–1974), COVID-19.
- Loring Mandel, 91, American playwright and screenwriter, cancer.
- Terrence McNally, 81, American playwright (Ragtime, Kiss of the Spider Woman, Love! Valour! Compassion!) and screenwriter, Tony winner (1993, 1995, 1996), COVID-19.
- Tom McNeil, 90, Australian footballer (St Kilda) and MLC (1977–1989).
- Anatoliy Mokrenko, 87, Ukrainian opera singer.
- John F. Murray, 92, American pulmonologist, COVID-19.
- Kari Onstad, 79, Norwegian actress, stroke.
- Juan Padrón, 73, Cuban comics artist (Elpidio Valdés) and animator (Vampires in Havana), lung disease.
- Jenny Polanco, 62, Dominican fashion designer, COVID-19.
- Robert A. Rescorla, 79, American psychologist.
- Bill Rieflin, 59, American rock drummer (Ministry, Revolting Cocks, King Crimson), cancer.
- Tony Rutter, 78, British motorcycle racer, Formula TT world champion (1981–1984).
- Tommy Sauer, 49, American mixed martial artist.
- Odile Schmitt, 63, French actress (Light Years Away, Film Socialisme, Hollywoo).
- Bernard Schreiner, 82, French politician, Deputy (1988–2007).
- Gerard Schurmann, 96, Dutch-British composer and conductor (The Bedford Incident, Attack on the Iron Coast, Claretta).
- Edward Tarr, 83, American trumpeter, Grammy Award winner, complications from heart surgery.
- Nacho Trelles, 103, Mexican football player (Necaxa) and manager (Toluca, national team), heart attack.
- Albert Uderzo, 92, French comic book artist (Asterix, Oumpah-pah), heart attack.

=== 25 ===
- Harry Aarts, 90, Dutch politician, MP (1973–1993), COVID-19.
- Soledad Alatorre, 94, Mexican labor activist.
- Edman Ayvazyan, 87, Iranian-Armenian painter.
- Danilo Barozzi, 92, Italian racing cyclist, complications from a broken femur.
- William Bartholomay, 91, American insurance executive, owner of the Milwaukee and Atlanta Braves.
- Tissa Nagodavithana, 78, Sri Lankan film preservationist, producer and filmmaker.
- Jennifer Bate, 75, British concert organist, cancer.
- Jean-Louis Bernard, 81, French politician, MP (1993–2012) and Mayor of Orléans (1988–1989).
- MaryAnn Black, 76, American politician, member of the North Carolina House of Representatives (since 2017), cancer.
- Mark Blum, 69, American actor (Crocodile Dundee, Mozart in the Jungle, Desperately Seeking Susan), COVID-19.
- Floyd Cardoz, 59, Indian-American chef (Top Chef Masters), COVID-19.
- Junseok Chae, South Korean engineer, bludgeoned.
- Ousmane Conté, Guinean politician.
- John DeBrito, 51, American soccer player.
- Aric del Rosario, 80, Filipino basketball coach (UST Growling Tigers, Pampanga Dragons, Perpetual Altas), cardiac arrest.
- Steve Dille, 75, American politician, Minnesota state representative (1987–1993) and Minnesota state senator (1993–2011).
- Jean-Jacques Fernier, 88, French architect and historian.
- Dario Gabbai, 97, Greek-American Holocaust survivor, Auschwitz Sonderkommando (1944).
- Martinho Lutero Galati, 66, Brazilian conductor, COVID-19.
- Nemai Ghosh, 85, Indian photographer (Goopy Gyne Bagha Byne, Agantuk).
- Horace Hardwick, 84, American politician.
- Karen Kamon, 68, American singer and actress.
- Peter Kemper, 77, Dutch footballer (PSV, national team).
- Henk Kronenberg, 85, Dutch Roman Catholic prelate, Bishop of Bougainville (1999–2009).
- Pierre Lagénie, 81, French sculptor.
- Donatien Laurent, 84, French musicologist and linguist.
- Bob Lee, 82, American baseball player (California Angels).
- Robert Levinson, American intelligence officer, missing since 2007. (declared legally deceased on this date)
- Liesbeth List, 78, Dutch singer, actress and television personality.
- T. M. Lotha, 68, Indian politician, MLA (1989–2008, since 2013).
- Joseph Ma Zhongmu, 100, Chinese Roman Catholic prelate, Bishop of Ningxia (1983–2005), pulmonary edema.
- Inna Makarova, 93, Russian actress (The Young Guard, The Return of Vasili Bortnikov, The Rumyantsev Case).
- Detto Mariano, 82, Italian musician (I Ribelli) and composer, COVID-19.
- Francis J. McManimon, 93, American politician, member of the New Jersey General Assembly (1972–1982) and Senate (1982–1992).
- Angelo Moreschi, 67, Italian Roman Catholic prelate, Apostolic Vicar of Gambella (since 2009), COVID-19.
- Vusamazulu Credo Mutwa, 98, South African traditional healer and conspiracy theorist.
- Nimmi, 87, Indian actress (Aan, Mere Mehboob, Pooja Ke Phool).
- Jamal Aldin Omar, 60, Sudanese politician, Minister of Defence (since 2019), heart attack.
- Richard Reeves, 83, American writer, cardiac arrest.
- Freddy Rodriguez, 89, American saxophonist and composer, COVID-19.
- Garret T. Sato, 55, American actor (Hawaii Five-0, The Wolverine, Midway).
- Mike Stratton, 78, American football player (Buffalo Bills, San Diego Chargers), complications from a fall.
- Sudjiatmi, 77, Indonesian presidential mother.
- Terry Tausch, 61, American football player (Minnesota Vikings, San Francisco 49ers).
- Jean-Yves Veillard, 81, French historian.
- Mark Wurtz, 55, American professional golfer.

=== 26 ===
- Roger Baens, 86, Belgian racing cyclist.
- Joe Baltake, 74, American film critic (Sacramento Bee, The Philadelphia Inquirer), multiple myeloma.
- Robert A. Barth, 89, United States Navy Chief Quartermaster and aquanaut, complications of Parkinson's disease.
- Tibor Bodon, 88, Hungarian footballer.
- Princess María Teresa of Bourbon-Parma, 86, French-Spanish royal, COVID-19.
- Jenny Clack, 72, English palaeontologist.
- Menggie Cobarrubias, 68, Filipino actor, COVID-19.
- Balázs Csákabonyi, 83, Hungarian politician and lawyer, MP (1994–2010).
- Ito Curata, 60, Filipino fashion designer, COVID-19.
- Constantin Drăgănescu, 83, Romanian actor (Dark Angel: The Ascent, Everyday God Kisses Us On The Mouth, The Japanese Dog).
- Jean Ginibre, 82, French mathematical physicist.
- Colin Graham, 90, New Zealand cricketer (Otago).
- Lee Guittar, 88, American newspaper executive and publisher.
- Satish Gujral, 94, Indian painter and sculptor.
- Michel Hidalgo, 87, French football player (Monaco, Reims) and manager (national team).
- Olle Holmquist, 83, Swedish trombonist (James Last Orchestra), COVID-19.
- Rolf Huisgen, 99, German chemist, developer of 1,3-Dipolar cycloaddition.
- John Hyde, 89, Australian footballer (Geelong), cancer.
- Oscar Ichazo, 88, Bolivian spiritual teacher, founder of the Arica School.
- Nikola Khristov, 68, Bulgarian Olympic shot putter.
- Carl Kirkwood, 90, Australian politician, member of the Victorian Legislative Assembly (1970–1988).
- Neil Landon, 78, English singer (The Flower Pot Men, Fat Mattress).
- Bill Martin, 81, Scottish songwriter ("Puppet on a String", "Congratulations", "Back Home") and music publisher.
- David Mason, 88, American stonemason.
- Rade Mihaljčić, 83, Serbian historian and academic.
- Naomi Munakata, 64, Japanese-Brazilian conductor, COVID-19.
- Curly Neal, 77, American basketball player (Harlem Globetrotters).
- Bob Ojeda, 78, American jazz trumpeter, complications following surgery.
- John O'Leary, 70, Irish golfer and executive (PGA European Tour), winner of Irish Open (1982).
- Ellis D. Parker, 87, American lieutenant general.
- Frank Pietri, 85, American jazz dance instructor and choreographer.
- Lawrence R. Pomeroy, 94, American zoologist and ecologist.
- Gainor Roberts, 78, American artist.
- Suellen Rocca, 76, American artist, pancreatic cancer.
- Luigi Roni, 78, Italian opera singer, COVID-19.
- Georges Rostan, 86, French actor (La Cuisine au Beurre, L'Âge ingrat).
- John Sears, 79, American political strategist, heart attack.
- V. Sethuraman, 35, Indian actor (Kanna Laddu Thinna Aasaiya, Vaaliba Raja, 50/50), cardiac arrest.
- Sunder Shiam, 89, Indian Olympic wrestler.
- Fred Smith, 77, English footballer (Burnley, Portsmouth, Halifax Town).
- Michael Sorkin, 71, American architect, COVID-19.
- Robin Thomas, 57, Czech-born American graph theorist, amyotrophic lateral sclerosis.
- Michael J. Tyler, 82, British-Australian herpetologist.
- Mekia Valentine, 32, American basketball player.
- Manuel del Valle, 80, Spanish lawyer and politician, Mayor of Seville (1983–1991), leukaemia.
- Walter Wegmüller, 83, Swiss painter and musician.
- Hamish Wilson, 77, Scottish actor (Doctor Who) and radio producer (Radio Forth, Radio Clyde), COVID-19.
- Jimmy Wynn, 78, American baseball player (Houston Astros, Los Angeles Dodgers, Atlanta Braves).
- Jon Wynne-Tyson, 95, English publisher, writer and animal rights campaigner.
- Daniel Yuste, 75, Spanish Olympic racing cyclist (1968), COVID-19.

=== 27 ===
- Jacques F. Acar, 88, Senegalese-born French doctor, COVID-19.
- Roberto Alemann, 97, Argentine politician, Minister of Economy (1961–1962, 1981–1982).
- Bob Andy, 75, Jamaican reggae singer (The Paragons, Bob and Marcia), songwriter and actor (The Mighty Quinn).
- Issa Issaka Aubin, 49 - 50, Central African warlord.
- Daniel Azulay, 72, Brazilian comic book artist and cartoonist, complications from leukemia and COVID-19.
- Brian Blume, 70, American game designer, co-founder of TSR, Inc., Lewy body dementia and Parkinson's disease.
- Robert Campbell, 82, American politician, member of the California State Assembly (1980–1996), cancer.
- Willy Diméglio, 85, French politician.
- Mirna Doris, 79, Italian singer, cancer.
- Graviola Ewing, 89, Guatemalan Olympic sprinter (1952).
- Carl Friedman, 67, Dutch writer.
- Randolph Stewart, 13th Earl of Galloway, 91, Scottish peer.
- Jesús Gayoso Rey, 48, Spanish Civil Guard lieutenant colonel, head of Rapid Action Group (since 2014) and chief of Haro lockdown, COVID-19.
- Daniel Gevargiz, 79, Iranian Olympic weightlifter (1968).
- José Luis González Novalín, 91, Spanish priest, COVID-19.
- Virginia Hawkins, 86, American actress (Dynasty, Medical Center, The Master of Disguise).
- Petra Hillenius, 52, Dutch Olympic swimmer (1984), amyotrophic lateral sclerosis.
- Aneurin Hughes, 83, British diplomat.
- Les Hunter, 77, American basketball player (Baltimore Bullets, Miami Floridians, Loyola Ramblers), National Champion (1963), cancer.
- Hamed Karoui, 92, Tunisian politician, Prime Minister (1989–1999) and Minister of Justice (1988–1989).
- Frank Larkin, 48, Irish disability rights activist.
- Stefan Lippe, 64, German insurance manager, CEO of Swiss Re (2009–2012), COVID-19.
- Joseph Lowery, 98, American minister and activist, President of the Southern Christian Leadership Conference (1977–1997).
- Glenda MacQueen, 55, Canadian medical researcher, breast cancer.
- Orlando McDaniel, 59, American football player (Denver Broncos), COVID-19.
- Michael McKinnell, 84, British-born American architect, co-founder of Kallmann McKinnell & Wood, COVID-19.
- Thandika Mkandawire, 79, Malawian-Swedish economist.
- Dick Murley, 86, American football player (Pittsburgh Steelers, Philadelphia Eagles).
- Frank Myler, 81, English rugby league player (Widnes Vikings, St Helens, national team).
- P. A. Ogundipe, 92, Nigerian writer and civil servant, COVID-19.
- Dositeo Rodríguez, 84, Spanish politician, minister of presidency, civil service and justice of Galicia (1990–1999) and member of the Galician parliament (1993–1999), COVID-19.
- Lanny D. Schmidt, 81, American chemist.
- George Sidhom, 81, Egyptian comedian and actor.
- Imam Suroso, 56, Indonesian politician, member of the People's Representative Council (since 2009), COVID-19.
- Beni Prasad Verma, 79, Indian politician, Minister of Steel (2011–2014) and MP (1996–2014, since 2016).
- Delroy Washington, 67, British-Jamaican reggae singer.
- Don I. Wortman, 92, American civil servant.
- Zhou Jun, 88, Chinese botanist.

=== 28 ===
- Fevzi Aksoy, 89, Turkish sports writer and medical doctor.
- Elvia Andreoli, 69–70, Argentine actress (Aquellos años locos, Atrapadas, Asesinato a distancia).
- Kerstin Behrendtz, 69, Swedish radio presenter, COVID-19.
- Nicolás Brizuela, 70, Argentine musician.
- John Callahan, 66, American actor (All My Children, Falcon Crest, Days of Our Lives), stroke.
- Lyn Christie, 91, Australian-born American jazz bassist.
- Tom Coburn, 72, American politician, member of the U.S. Senate (2005–2015) and House of Representatives (1995–2001), prostate cancer.
- Conor Connelly, 44, Irish Gaelic footballer (St. Jude, Roscommon).
- George Corones, 101, Australian Masters swimmer.
- Burr Davis, 83, American football player (Winnipeg Blue Bombers).
- April Dunn, 33, American disability rights activist, COVID-19.
- Matthew Faber, 47, American actor (Welcome to the Dollhouse, The Pallbearer, Natural Born Killers).
- Florencio Flores Aguilar, 88, Panamanian army officer.
- Chato Galante, 71, Spanish pro-democracy activist and political prisoner, COVID-19.
- Jean-Claude Ganga, 86, Congolese sports administrator (International Olympic Committee).
- Rodolfo González Rissotto, 70, Uruguayan historian and politician, Minister of National Defence (1995), COVID-19.
- Grim Sleeper, 67, American serial killer.
- Charles Harlow, 77, American politician, complications from frontotemporal dementia.
- William B. Helmreich, 74, American sociologist and writer, COVID-19.
- Jan Howard, 91, American country singer and songwriter ("The One You Slip Around With", "For Loving You", "Evil on Your Mind").
- Pearson Jordan, 69, Barbadian Olympic sprinter (1976), COVID-19.
- Willa Kenoyer, 86, American politician.
- Azam Khan, 93, Pakistani squash player, COVID-19.
- Lu Shibi, 89, Chinese orthopaedic surgeon.
- Dan McCauley, 84, British football chairman (Plymouth Argyle).
- Monroe G. McKay, 91, American jurist, Judge (since 1977) and Chief Judge (1991–1993) of the U.S. Court of Appeals for the Tenth Circuit.
- Denise Millet, 86, French comic book artist.
- Barbara Rütting, 92, German actress (Doctor Sibelius, Town Without Pity, Turtledove General Delivery) and politician, member of the Landtag of Bavaria (2003–2009).
- Thomas Schäfer, 54, German politician, Minister of Finance in Hesse (since 2010), suicide by train.
- David Schramm, 73, American actor (Wings, Johnny Handsome, Kennedy), heart attack.
- Goldie Sellers, 78, American football player (Denver Broncos, Kansas City Chiefs), cancer.
- Michel Tibon-Cornillot, 97, French philosopher and anthropologist, COVID-19.
- Hertha Töpper, 95, Austrian contralto.
- Virginia Tufte, 101, American writer and academic.
- Edoardo Vesentini, 91, Italian mathematician (Andreotti-Vesentini theorem) and politician, Director of the Scuola Normale Superiore di Pisa (1978–1987) and Senator (1987–1992).
- Salvador Vives, 77, Spanish actor and voice actor, COVID-19.
- William Wolf, 94, American author and theater critic, COVID-19.

=== 29 ===
- Claude Abadie, 100, French jazz clarinettist and bandleader.
- Opoku Afriyie, 75, Ghanaian footballer (Asante Kotoko, Hearts of Oak, national team).
- Philip W. Anderson, 96, American physicist (Anderson localization, Anderson Hamiltonian, Anderson orthogonality theorem), Nobel Prize laureate (1977).
- Peter Beaumont, 85, British racehorse trainer (Jodami).
- Beryl Bernay, 94, American television host and journalist, COVID-19.
- Attilio Bignasca, 76, Swiss politician, National Councillor (2003–2009).
- Yuri Bondarev, 96, Russian writer and screenwriter (Liberation).
- Joseph Braig, 83, American politician.
- Tom Burford, 84, American pomologist and apple historian.
- Karla Valentina Camarena, 33 or 34, Mexican trans rights activist.
- José Luis Capón, 72, Spanish footballer (Atlético Madrid, Elche, national team), COVID-19.
- Jean-François Cesarini, 49, French politician, Deputy (since 2017), cancer.
- Emilia Currás, 92, Spanish information scientist and academic, COVID-19.
- Patrick Devedjian, 75, French politician, mayor of Antony (1983–2002), president of the General Council of Hauts-de-Seine (since 2007), COVID-19.
- Joe Diffie, 61, American country singer-songwriter ("Home", "Third Rock from the Sun", "Pickup Man"), COVID-19.
- Nikolai Dimidyuk, 83, Russian military officer, commander of the Russian Missile Troops and Artillery (1991–1997).
- Sir Hilbourne Frank, 88, Antiguan politician.
- Robert H. Garff, 77, American automotive dealer and politician, member (1978–1987) and Speaker (1985–1987) of the Utah House of Representatives, COVID-19.
- David Hodgkiss, 71, British cricket chairman (Lancashire), COVID-19.
- Parviz Kambin, 88, Iranian-born American orthopedic surgeon.
- Jim Lambright, 77, American football coach (Washington Huskies).
- Maria Mercader, 54, American news producer (CBS, 60 Minutes, CBS Sunday Morning), COVID-19.
- Alan Merrill, 69, American musician (Arrows) and songwriter ("I Love Rock 'n' Roll"), COVID-19.
- Paravai Muniyamma, 82, Indian folk singer and actress (Dhool, Kovil, Savaale Samaali).
- Joseph A. O'Hare, 89, American Jesuit, president of Fordham University.
- Tomas Oneborg, 62, Swedish photographer, COVID-19.
- Krzysztof Penderecki, 86, Polish composer (Threnody to the Victims of Hiroshima, Anaklasis, Utrenja) and conductor.
- Jim Quinlan, 85, American writer and journalist.
- Tuku Raka, 56, Papua New Guinean cricketer (national team).
- James Ramsden, 96, British politician, MP (1954–1974), Secretary of State for War (1963–1964) and Minister for the Armed Forces (1964).
- Francis Rapp, 93, French historian, COVID-19.
- Isaac Robinson, 44, American politician, member of the Michigan House of Representatives (since 2019), COVID-19.
- Angelo Rottoli, 61, Italian professional boxer, COVID-19.
- Jean-Louis Roy, 81–82, Swiss film director (Black Out).
- Derek Semmence, 81, English cricketer (Sussex).
- Ken Shimura, 70, Japanese comedian, COVID-19.
- Chandan Singh, 94, Indian military officer.
- Henri Tincq, 74, French journalist, COVID-19.

=== 30 ===
- Antonio Álvarez Solís, 90, Spanish journalist, founder of Interviú.
- Luis Arce Gómez, 82, Bolivian military officer, Minister of Interior (1980–1981), heart failure.
- Joe Ashton, 86, British politician, MP (1968–2001).
- Jean-Guy Astresses, 90, French footballer (Girondins de Bordeaux).
- Hansruedi Beugger, 89, Swiss Olympic bobsledder (1964).
- Maurice Bidermann, 87, French industrialist.
- Lorena Borjas, 59, Mexican-American transgender rights activist, COVID-19.
- Henry Brabham, 90, American ice hockey executive, co-founder of the ECHL.
- Wilhelm Burmann, 80, German ballet master, renal failure complicated by COVID-19.
- Don Campbell, 69, American dancer and choreographer.
- Arianne Caoili, 33, Filipino-Australian chess player, traffic collision.
- Philip Carr, 66, Scottish linguist, cancer.
- Jean-Claude Chamboredon, 81, French sociologist.
- Joe Clark, 78, Canadian-born American aviation entrepreneur, co-founder of Horizon Air, fall.
- Tomie dePaola, 85, American writer, illustrator (Strega Nona, 26 Fairmount Avenue), and television personality (Telling Stories with Tomie dePaola), complications from surgery after a fall.
- Hilary Dwyer, 74, English actress (Witchfinder General, Cry of the Banshee, Wuthering Heights), COVID-19.
- Louise Ebrel, 87, French singer (Les Ramoneurs de menhirs).
- Raymond L. Erikson, 84, American molecular biologist and virologist.
- Kurt W. Fischer, 76, American developmental psychologist.
- Nathan Fong, 61, Canadian chef, heart attack.
- Alex Forsyth, 91, Scottish footballer (Albion Rovers, Darlington, East Stirlingshire).
- William Gianelli, 101, American engineer and public servant.
- Manolis Glezos, 97, Greek resistance activist and politician, MEP (1984–1985, 2014–2015), heart failure.
- James T. Goodrich, 73, American neurosurgeon, COVID-19.
- John Haselden, 76, English football player (Rotherham United, Doncaster Rovers) and manager (Huddersfield Town), complications of dementia.
- Hau Pei-tsun, 100, Taiwanese military officer and politician, Chief of the General Staff (1981–1989) and Premier (1990–1993), multiple organ failure.
- Abdul Qadir Junejo, 74, Pakistani novelist and playwright.
- Milutin Knežević, 71, Serbian Orthodox prelate, Bishop of Australia and New Zealand (2003–2006) and Valjevo (since 2006), COVID-19.
- Ted Knight, 86, English politician.
- Bruce MacDonald, 92, American Olympic athlete (1956, 1960, 1964).
- Ivo Mahlknecht, 80, Italian Olympic alpine skier (1964, 1968), COVID-19.
- Frank Maloney, 79, American football player (Michigan Wolverines) and coach (Syracuse Orange), brain cancer.
- Romek Marber, 94, Polish graphic designer and academic.
- Tom McArthur, 81, English linguist.
- Bob Minihane, 82, American football player (Hamilton Tiger-Cats, Montreal Alouettes).
- Ted Monette, 74, American army colonel and FEMA director, COVID-19.
- Alfie Monk, 86, Irish Gaelic footballer (Louth).
- Raphael S. Ndingi Mwana a'Nzeki, 88, Kenyan Roman Catholic prelate, Archbishop of Nairobi (1997–2007).
- Kwasi Owusu, 72, Ghanaian Olympic footballer (1972).
- Millie Peterson, 75, American politician, member of the Utah State Senate (1991–2003).
- Tim Petros, 58, Canadian football player (Calgary Stampeders), heart attack.
- Daniel Prude, 41, American police detainee, asphyxia.
- Riachão, 98, Brazilian samba composer and singer.
- Mykhaylo Storozhenko, 82, Ukrainian Olympic athlete (1964).
- Martin Tudor, 43, Romanian football player (Olimpia Satu Mare, FCSB, CFR Cluj) and manager, heart attack.
- Jacques Vandier, 92, French entrepreneur (Macif).
- Manuel Adolfo Varas, 76, Ecuadorian broadcaster, sports journalist and lawyer, COVID-19.
- Vilhjálmur Vilmundarson, 90, Icelandic Olympic shot putter.
- Bill Withers, 81, American Hall of Fame singer-songwriter ("Lean on Me", "Ain't No Sunshine", "Lovely Day"), heart disease.
- Joachim Yhombi-Opango, 81, Congolese politician, President (1977–1979) and Prime Minister (1993–1996), COVID-19.

=== 31 ===
- Mark Azbel, 87, Soviet-born Israeli physicist.
- Jim Bailey, 90, Australian Olympic athlete (1956).
- Martha Banta, 91, American literary scholar, complications from a fall.
- Bruno Barbatti, 93, Swiss scholar and writer.
- Pierre Bénichou, 82, French journalist.
- Julie Bennett, 81, American actress (What's Up, Tiger Lily?, The Yogi Bear Show, Sole Survivor), COVID-19.
- Arthur Berney, 89, American legal scholar.
- Edmond W. Burke, 84, American jurist, Justice (1975–1983) and Chief Justice (1981–1984) of the Alaska Supreme Court.
- Donna Caroll, 80, Argentine jazz singer and actress.
- Gian Carlo Ceruti, 67, Italian sports manager and trade unionist, president of the Italian Cycling Federation (1997–2005), COVID-19.
- Michel Chodkiewicz, 90, French author.
- Cristina, 64, American singer ("Disco Clone", "Is That All There Is?"), COVID-19.
- Viktar Dashkevich, 75, Belarusian stage actor, COVID-19.
- Pape Diouf, 68, Senegalese journalist and football administrator, president of Olympique de Marseille (2005–2009), COVID-19.
- Szabolcs Fazakas, 72, Hungarian politician, MEP (2004–2009).
- Richard C. Friedman, 79, American academic psychiatrist.
- Aleksei Frolikov, 63, Russian ice hockey player (Dynamo Moscow).
- Rafael Gómez Nieto, 99, Spanish soldier (La Nueve), COVID-19.
- James Gordon, Baron Gordon of Strathblane, 83, Scottish businessman, founder of Radio Clyde, COVID-19.
- Jeff Grosso, 51, American skateboarder.
- Bob Hasan, 89, Indonesian businessman and politician, Minister of Industry and Trade (1998), lung cancer.
- Marcel Huguenin, 89, Swiss Olympic cross country skier (1956, 1960).
- Andrew Jack, 76, British dialect coach (The Lord of the Rings, Sherlock Holmes) and actor (Star Wars), COVID-19.
- Abdul Halim Khaddam, 87, Syrian politician, Vice President (1984–2005), Acting President (2000) and Minister of Foreign Affairs (1970–1984), heart attack.
- Ian King, 88, English cricketer (Warwickshire, Essex).
- Eva Krížiková, 85, Slovak actress (In the Coat of Lioness' Arms).
- Hedgemon Lewis, 74, American boxer and trainer.
- Reimar Lüst, 97, German astrophysicist, director of the Max Planck Society (1972–1984), director-general of the European Space Agency (1984–1990).
- Arthur Marsh, 72, English footballer (Bolton Wanderers).
- Vincent Marzello, 68, American actor (The Witches, Never Say Never Again, Bob the Builder).
- Paul Natali, 86, French politician, Senator (1998–2005).
- Adolphe Nicolas, 84, French geologist.
- Zoltán Peskó, 83, Hungarian conductor and composer.
- Gita Ramjee, 63, Ugandan-South African HIV prevention researcher, COVID-19.
- James A. Redden, 91, American jurist and politician, Oregon State Treasurer (1973–1977), Attorney General (1977–1980) and Judge (since 1980) and Chief Judge (1990–1995) of the D. Ore.
- Wallace Roney, 59, American jazz trumpeter, COVID-19.
- Kiyoshi Sasabe, 62, Japanese film director (Chirusoku no natsu, Half a Confession, Town of Evening Calm, Country of Cherry Blossoms).
- Jack Schofield, 72, British technology journalist (The Guardian, Practical Computing), heart attack.
- Fedir Shpyh, 64, Ukrainian politician and businessman, member of Verkhovna Rada (1998–2007), traffic collision.
- Peter J. N. Sinclair, 73, British economist, COVID-19.
- Michael Wakelam, 64, British molecular biologist, COVID-19.
- Leonid Zorin, 95, Russian playwright, cardiac arrest.
