= Maresca =

Maresca is an Italian surname. Notable people with the surname include:

- Enzo Maresca (born 1980), Italian professional footballer and football manager
- Ernie Maresca (1938–2015), American singer-songwriter and record company executive
- Frank Maresca (art dealer) (born 1948), American art dealer
- John J. Maresca (born 1937), Italian-American diplomat, business leader, and educator
- Liliana Maresca (1951–1994), Argentine artist
- Luca Maresca (born 1993), Italian karateka
- Marisa Maresca (1923–1988), Italian showgirl, soubrette, and theatre dancer
- Marshall Ryan Maresca (born 1973), American fantasy author
- Orest V. Maresca (1914–2000), American politician
- Pasquale Russo Maresca (1968–2020), Italian painter
- Pierre Maresca (1941–2020), French politician and journalist in New Caledonia
- Pupetta Maresca (1935–2021), a.k.a. Pupetta (Little Doll), former beauty queen and a well-known figure in the Camorra
- Salvatore Maresca (born 1993), Italian artistic gymnast
- Santiago Maresca (born 1994), Uruguayan tennis player

== See also ==
- Moresca, a type of dance
- Frank the Entertainer in a Basement Affair

Media related to Maresca (surname) at Wikimedia Commons
