= Adolphe Nicolas =

French geologist (1936–2020)

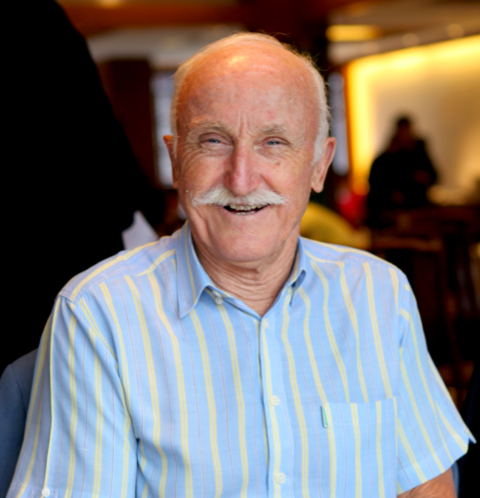
- Adolphe Nicolas
- Born: 18 February 1936; Rennes, France
- Died: 31 March 2020 (aged 84); Saint-Cyr-l'École, France
- Occupation: Geologist

Adolphe Nicolas (18 February 1936 – 31 March 2020) was a French geologist, specializing in tectonics and petrophysics.

== Biography ==
Born in 1936 in Rennes, Nicolas lived in Morocco following World War II, where his father worked as a doctor for the World Health Organization. He first studied in the United States, and then completed his graduate studies at the University of Paris, studying physics and earth sciences.

In 1958, he was recruited by the École nationale supérieure des mines de Nancy, where he was a teacher and researcher. He then left for the University of Nantes, where he was appointed professor in 1968 and founded the Laboratoire de Tectonophysique (Laboratory of Tectonophysics). He taught at the École Polytechnique Feminine until his retirement in 2003. He was a professor emeritus at the University of Montpellier until his death on 31 March 2020.

He and his team produced a large volume of first-order research on the physical properties of the mantle and on plastic deformation of the solid Earth, as recorded by crystallographic orientations of minerals. Through this research, Nicolas initiated collaborations that lasted for more than 70 years, including work with Dale Jackson, Steve Kirby, and Harry Green during an influential sabbatical in California; studies with Emile Den Tex in the Netherlands; and research with Jean-Paul Poirier that was exemplified by their classic 1976 book Crystalline Plasticity and Solid State Flow in Metamorphic Rocks.
Nicolas’s interest in mantle processes continued throughout his career, producing major advances reported in numerous papers and seven books. His most notable contributions include studies quantifying and interpreting microstructures in rocks in terms of deformation processes and seismic anisotropy, and studies of the formation of oceanic lithosphere at spreading centers, which were based on observations in ophiolite.

== Works ==
- Etude pétrographique de la région de Raon-l'Étape-Senones (Vosges) (1960)
- Le Complexe ophiolites-schistes lustrés entre Dora Maïra et Grand Paradis (Alpes piémontaises), tectonique et métamorphisme (1960)
- Crystalline Plasticity and Solid State Flow in Metamorphic Rocks (1976)
- Principes de tectonique (1984)
- Principles of rock deformation (1987)
  - Nicolas, Adolphe (31 January 1987). Principles of Rock Deformation. ISBN 9789027723680.
  - Bouchez, Jean-Luc; Nicolas, Adolphe (31 August 2021). Principles of Rock Deformation and Tectonics. ISBN 978-0-19-265763-3.
- Structures of ophiolites and dynamics of oceanic lithosphere (1989)
  - Nicolas, A. (6 December 2012). Structures of Ophiolites and Dynamics of Oceanic Lithosphere. ISBN 9789400923744.
- Les montagnes sous la mer : expansion des océans et tectonique des plaques (1990)
- Orogenic lherzolites and mantle processes (1991)
- The mid-oceanic ridges: mountains below sea level (1995)
  - Nicolas, Adolphe (17 April 2013). The Mid-Oceanic Ridges: Mountains Below Sea Level. ISBN 9783662031360.
- 2050, rendez-vous à risques (2004)
- Futur empoisonné : quels défis ? (2007)
- Énergies, une pénurie au secours du climat ? (2011)
- Principes de Tectonique (2018)
  - Bouchez, Jean-Luc; Nicolas, Adolphe (15 May 2018). Principes de tectonique. ISBN 9782807315129.
