= Bill Linger =

Australian rules footballer (1931–2020)

Personal information
- Full name: William Bevan Linger
- Born: 11 May 1931; Mathinna, Tasmania
- Died: 10 March 2020 (age 88); Grafton, New South Wales
- Original team: Launceston City
- Height: 171 cm (5 ft 7 in)
- Weight: 81 kg (179 lb)

Playing career^{1}
Years	Club	Games (Goals)
1953–54	St Kilda	31 (22)
- ^{1} Playing statistics correct to the end of 1954.

William Bevan Linger (11 May 1931 – 10 March 2020) was an Australian rules footballer who played with St Kilda in the Victorian Football League (VFL).
