= Charles Atger =

French pilot (1921–2020)

- Born: 18 June 1921; Gréoux-les-Bains, France
- Died: 15 March 2020 (aged 98); Gréoux-les-Bains, France
- Occupation: Pilot

Charles Atger (18 June 1921 – 15 March 2020) was a French pilot. He has held the World Record for longest glider flight time since 1952.

== Biography ==
Atger was born on 18 June 1921 in Gréoux-les-Bains in the Alpes-de-Haute-Provence region of France. His father was a naval officer, and Atger worked as a farmer on his parents' estate growing up.

Due to health issues with his lungs, Atger's parents forbade him from flying, but after a hunger strike and approval from a doctor, they budged. In 1938, Atger obtained his glider pilot's license. He passed his first degree license in 1939, but, due to World War II, he was unable to obtain his second degree. After the end of the war, Atger returned home and began flying again in Saint-Auban and Saint-Rémy-de-Provence.

From 2 to 4 April 1952, Atger flew 56 hours and 15 minutes over the Alpilles, breaking the world record. He was aiming for 60 hours, but fell short of this goal due to sickness. Bertrand Dauvin attempted to break this record in 1956, but crashed after flying for 26 hours. After this, the Fédération Aéronautique Internationale banned attempting to break the record, due to the danger of the flight.

After the French government prevented him from flying due to hearing problems, Atger moved to Argentina, despite not knowing Spanish. Here, he worked as an agricultural pilot, amassing 33,600 total hours of flight time, another record. On 20 February 1993, he returned to France and retired in his native village of Gréoux-les-Bains. Charles Atger died on 15 March 2020 at the age of 98.
