= Nora Illi =

Swiss Muslim activist

Personal life
- Born: Nora Gögel; 3 April 1984 Uster, Switzerland
- Died: 23 March 2020 (aged 35) Bremgarten bei Bern, Switzerland
- Spouse: Qaasim Illi (m. 2003)
- Main interest(s): Islamic Preaching, Dawah

Religious life
- Religion: Islam
- Denomination: Ahlus-Sunnah wa’l-Jama’ah
- Jurisprudence: Salafi

Nora Illi (3 April 1984 – 23 March 2020) was a Swiss convert to Islam and Islamic preacher. She was chairwoman of the Islamic Central Council of Switzerland (ICCS). She took part in several T.V. talk shows and caused heated discussions with her intellectual and political views.

== Early life ==
She was born as Nora Gögel on 3 April 1984 in Uster, Canton of Zürich. Her father was a well-known Swiss psychotherapist of German origins and her mother was a Swiss social worker. They had a divorce years later. Illi was baptized Catholic upon her own request. As a teen, she promoted individual freedom and anti-establishment views, and at the age of 18, Illi converted to Islam. Illi travelled to Dubai, and over there converted to Islam after she heard the Adhan. Upon returning to Switzerland, she converted to Islam. Two weeks later, her husband, Qaasim Illi (he was only her boyfriend then), also became an Islamic convert. Both were active members of the Islamic Central Council of Switzerland (ICCS). By the age of twenty, Nora Illi wore the Niqab (face veil) in public. She continued her education in her home town until she was awarded a PhD in theology from the University of Zurich. Illi chaired the Department of Women Affairs at the Islamic Central Council of Switzerland (ICCS). After converting to Islam, she became an Islamic preacher. In a T.V. interview on the talk show of Anne Will in November 2016, Illi said "I used to have prejudices against Muslims; I also used to think that Muslim women are all oppressed. However, I discovered that Islam treats women as pearls." She added that she came to the conclusion that there are some wrong issues and beliefs which stem from different cultures that have been attributed to Islam but have nothing to do with it in reality. Illi confirmed that because of Islam, she started to have self-assertion as a woman, adding that being a Muslim woman, she was never treated as a commodity. She stressed the fact that before she started to wear the face veil, men used to treat her as a commodity and they were attracted only to her body. Illi was hosted by several T.V. shows where she voiced several intellectual and political views for both the German and Swiss media. In November 2016, Illi's appearance on the best-known T.V. show of Anne Will caused a lot of controversy and uproar about whether radical opinions should be represented on a T.V. show. Some quotes by Illi were shown during the interview and were interpreted as propaganda for the radical views of the terrorist militia of the Islamic State. Several lawsuits were filed against her as a result of that discussion, but the Hamburg Public Prosecutor office suspended all preliminary investigations in February, 2017.

Having appeared on T.V. and in public events inside and outside Switzerland with a face veil on, Illi caused a lot of uproar. She was harassed and insulted on a daily basis because of her black face veil. Illi was an advocate of polygamy, the practice of having multiple wives, but she rejected polyandry, having multiple husbands. She was married to the computer scientist, Qaasim Illi, who also worked for the Islamic Central Council of Switzerland. They had six children.

== Death ==
Nora Illi died on 23 March 2020 at the age of 35 at one of Bern's hospitals after a long-term suffering with breast cancer.
