= Jean-Paul Poirier =

French physicist (born 1935)

Jean-Paul Poirier (born 13 May 1935) is a French physicist and member of the French Academy of Sciences.

== Biography and works ==
J.-P. Poirier is an engineer from the École Centrale Paris (1959), Doctor of Science (1971). He was an engineer at the French Atomic Energy Commission (CEA) from 1963 to 1978 and a physicist at the Institut de physique du globe in Paris from 1978 to 2003, where he created the Geomaterials Laboratory.

He was elected member of the Academia Europaea in 1993. He was correspondent of the French Academy of Sciences in 1994, and was elected member in October 2002. He has been elected to the Bureau des Longitudes since 1996 and is a member of the National Academy of History of Ecuador.

He has worked on the physical properties of the deep Earth (lower mantle and core) and is interested in historical seismology.

== Some recent publications ==
- Poirier, J.P. & T.J. Shankland (1993) Dislocation melting of iron and the temperature of the inner core, revisited, Geophys. J. Int., 115, 147-151.
- Poirier, J.P. Light elements in the Earth's outer core: a critical review, Phys. Earth Planet. Interiors, 85,(1994) 319-337.
- Poirier, J.P. & A. Tarantola A. logarithmic equation of state, Phys. Earth Planet. Interiors, 109,(1998) 1-8.
- Poirier, J.P. & G.D. Price Primary slip system of e-iron and anisotropy of the inner core, Phys. Earth Planet. Interiors, 110, (1999) 147-156.
- Poirier, J.P. Electrical Earthquakes : A short-lived Theory in the 18th Century, Earth Sciences History 35, (2016) 283-302.
- Poirier, J.P. Le grand séisme de Huaxian (1556) : quelques documents chinois, C.R. Geosciences 349, (2017) 49-52.
- Poirier, J.-P., Saints as protectors against earthquakes in popular culture in Italy and Latin America, Earth Sciences History 37, (2018) 157-164.
- Guidoboni, E., Poirier, J.-P., The oscillatory seismic motion and the daily motion of the Earth i Francesco Travagini's Physica disquisitio (1669). Earth Sciences History 37, (2018) 165-176.

== Books ==
- 1991 : Les Profondeurs de la Terre, Masson, coll. « Cahiers des sciences de l'univers », 1997, 2^{e} éd. (ISBN 978-2225852237)
- 1995 : Le Minéral et le Vivant, Ed. Fayard
- 1996 : Le Noyau de la Terre[5], Ed. Flammarion, coll. « Dominos »
- 1998 : La Terre, mère ou marâtre? Ed. Flammarion
- 1999 : Ces pierres qui tombent du ciel, Ed. Le Pommier,
- 2001 : Mystification à l'Académie des sciences, Ed. Le Pommier
- 2002 : Antoine d'Abbadie, Ed. Académie des sciences
- 2004 : Quand la terre tremblait, Ed. Odile Jacob - (ISBN 978-2-7381-1370-2)
- 2005 : Le tremblement de terre de Lisbonne, Ed. Odile Jacob - (ISBN 2-7381-1666-3)
- 2008 : L'abbé Bertholon - Un électricien des Lumières en province[6], Ed. Hermann - (ISBN 978 2 7056 6728 3)
- 2009 : A. Aspect, R. Balian, G. Bastard, J.P. Bouchaud, B. Cabane, F. Combes, T. Encrenaz, S. Fauve, A. Fert, M. Fink, A. Georges, J.F. Joanny, D. Kaplan, D. Le Bihan, P. Léna, H. Le Treut, J-P Poirier, J. Prost et J.L. Puget, Demain la physique, (Odile Jacob, 2009) (ISBN 9782738123053)
- 1985, 1991 : Creep of Crystals, Cambridge University Press.
- 1991, 2000 : Introduction to the Physics of the Earth's Interior, Cambridge University Press.
- 2009 : Antoine d'Abbadie - Voyageur et physicien du globe au XIX^{e} siècle, Ed. Hermann.
- 2010 : Jean-Baptiste Biot, un savant méconnu, Hermann.
- 2014 : Une brève histoire du magnétisme, Belin. (avec L.-L. Le Mouël).
- 2015 : Fernand de Montessus de Ballore (1851-1923) pionnier français de la science des tremblements de terre, Hermann.
- 2017 : La catastrophe de la Montagne Pelée (1902), un autre regard, L’Harmattan.
- 2018 : Le grand tremblement de terre de Calabre et de Messine (1783), L’Harmattan.
