= Oliver Lee Pitts =

American journalist (1916–2020)

- Born: March 23, 1916
- Died: March 19, 2020 (aged 103); Fort Worth, Texas, U.S.
- Occupations: Journalist, sailor, restaurateur, banker

Oliver Lee Pitts (March 23, 1916 – March 19, 2020) was an American journalist, sailor, restaurateur, and banker. He was the owner of the White Horse Tavern in Newport, Rhode Island from 1981 to 2006.
