= Janet Carr (psychologist) =

English psychologist (1927–2020)

Janet Gould Carr, OBE, née Gilfillan (1927–2020) was an English psychologist who conducted a landmark fifty-year study on families of children with Down syndrome.

== Life and work ==
Carr was born in Peking, China to English parents in 1927. At the time her father was headmaster of a Chinese school but when he became ill in 1931, the entire family returned to England. She attended Moira House School in Eastbourne and enrolled at Reading University, studying psychology from 1945 to 1948.

In 1954, she married a psychiatrist, Eric Carr, and they had three children, Jim, Nick and Sally. Janet Carr stepped back from academics to be a full-time mother for eight years.

When Carr returned to work part-time, she took on new project at the Maudsley Hospital in London and began studying the 54 babies who were born with Down’s syndrome in 1964. She evaluated the babies in three London boroughs and investigated their needs. She began work toward a PhD with Jack Tizard, who was at the Institute of Education, University of London. Her obituary summarized her initial observations:

"While Janet’s main task in the project was to assess the children’s cognitive development, she was also concerned to find out about the impact of the children on their families. At that time, Down’s syndrome was the largest group of children with severe intellectual handicap for whom a genetic cause had been found. Physically, the children were readily recognisable and the assumptions made were that their birth would put great strains on the family, including break-up. What Janet found through systematic and sensitive interviews shocked her. Mothers reported how professionals were indifferent to cruel in how they broke news of the diagnosis to parents and were pessimistic in the extreme about the children’s futures. This resulted in her first paper in 1970 on telling parents about mongolism, as Down’s syndrome was then called."

Carr kept up with the babies until they were four years old when she completed her PhD. She interviewed them again when they were 11. At the urging of colleagues, she followed up when the children were 21, and then again at 30 years old, by which time she had retired from the National Health Service (NHS). She interviewed them again at 40 and again at 45 when Carr was 82. She was aided in 2014 by her son Nick when interviewing the children when they were 50 years old.

An avid skier at 85, she played tennis until she reached 86.

In 2015, Carr was appointed OBE in recognition for her research into families of children with children with Down’s syndrome. She died peacefully on 17 March 2020 at almost 93.
