= Richard G. Austin (weightlifter) =

American weightlifter (1931–2020)

Richard G. Austin (March 17, 1931 – March 18, 2020) was an American amateur weightlifter and powerlifter and a member of the Maine Sports Hall of Fame.

== Life and career ==
Austin lived in the Virginia section of Rumford all his school age years with an exception of a year when he lived in Boston. Dick took up weight training at age 13 and has continued that training habit to this day.

In 1946 at the age of 17 he quit school and went to work for the Gulf Oil Co. in Chelsea, Massachusetts for one year. At age 20 he went to work for Oxford Paper Co., retiring in 1989. After working at Oxford for a few months he enlisted into the Army Airborne for 3 years. This was during the Korean War. He got into the 82nd Airborne Division and made 33 jumps in all. Jumping out of airplanes excited him; he says it was an enjoyable experience to say the least. From 4-6-51 to 4-6-54 and army life wasn’t for him. Food was lousy! He finished his schooling when he first got in and got his GED Equivalency Diploma. After an honorable discharge he returned home and went back to work in one month. In 1955 he married Annette Salatino, who died 12-14-05. They have 5 children and 12 grandchildren. It 1958 he broke all the existing two and one arm weight lifting records in Maine. Regular training took place until Mike Roy talked him into power-lifting competition. By 1980 he won his first world title and has continued on ever since, never once being defeated. He says, I wonder what it’s like to come in second? In his mind, that’s the first loser. He has a half dozen world and half dozen national titles and many of his records still exist. In fact, Sunday, April 5 he broke 2 world records but there wasn’t any listed. At 78 he finds it quite lonely in finding competition at his age. In 1998 a huge party at the Legion hosted by his sister- in-law, Lucy Day was given for him. It turned out to be a huge roast from all his close friends. From there he traveled to Austria with son Dicky and won a world title in which 16 countries competed.

Jerry Perkins had some of his wrestlers train with him to develop added strength. Several hundred kids trained at his gym to improve their sports skills and some returned to train there during and after college. Advice on training is free and he shares his knowledge with anyone willing to listen. For 38 years Alan Cayer has been lifting with Dick and won 3 World Titles in the Power-Lifting World.

In 1999 Dick was inducted into the Maine Sports Hall of Fame. Prior to his death, he was on the board of directors and also on the Honors and Selection Committee, whose job is to select potential incoming inductees.
