= Jean-Michel Cambon =

French climber (1952–2020)

- Born: 5 January 1952
- Died: 12 March 2020 (aged 68)
- Occupation: Climber

Jean-Michel Cambon (5 January 1952 — 12 March 2020) was a French climber.

== Biography ==
Teacher at Saint-Martin-d'Hères near Grenoble, Jean-Michel Cambom has dedicated the other half of his life to the mountains.

Cambon was known for navigating many climbing routes in France, particularly in the Oisans region. He is the author of several climbing guidebooks.

Jean-Michel Cambon died on 12 March 2020 after falling from a cliff near Cognet.

According to the report, the accident happened when he was working on a new route and was hanging on a fixed rope using a jumar. He had a loop of rope attaching the jumar to his harness. Trying to repeat a move to find the best location to drill for a bolt, he took a fall with slack in the system, leading to a high fall factor. The rope loop attached to his harness didn't resist the load from the fall and broke.

== Publications ==
- Les 60 escalades les moins pires de l'Oisans (1988)
- L'Oisans nouveau est arrivé, les 120 escalades les moins pires des massifs des Ecrins, Briançonnais, Cerces (1991)
- Oisans moderne, Oisans sauvage, 250 escalades parmi les moins pires des massifs des Écrins, du Briançonnais et des Cerces (1995)
- Escalades à Ailefroide (1995)
- Escalades à la Bérarde (1999)
- Oisans nouveau, Oisans sauvage, livre Est, 220 itinéraires d'escalade et d'alpinisme parmi les moins pires des massifs des Écrins-Est, du Briançonnais et des Cerces (2000)
