= Hanna Laursen =

Danish diver

Personal information
- Full name: Hanna Ivy Laursen
- Nationality: Danish
- Born: 19 May 1936 Copenhagen, Denmark
- Died: March 2020 (aged 83)

Sport
- Sport: Diving

Hanna Ivy Laursen (19 May 1936 – March 2020) was a Danish diver. She competed at the 1956 Summer Olympics and the 1960 Summer Olympics.
