= Usama Riaz =

Pakistani doctor (1993–2020)

- Born: 1993/1994
- Died: 23 March 2020 (aged 26)
- Cause of death: COVID-19
- Occupation: Physician
- Known for: Work during the COVID-19 pandemic

Usama Riaz (Urdu: اسامہ ریاض; 1993 – 23 March 2020) was a Pakistani physician from Gilgit-Baltistan.

== Career ==
During his career, Riaz screened pilgrims who had returned to Pakistan from Iran.

He also treated people in intensive care diagnosed with COVID-19, despite lacking personal protective equipment, which increased his personal risk.

== Death ==
Riaz died on 23 March 2020, from COVID-19 complications at the age of 26. Riaz was the first Pakistani doctor to die from the virus.

On 27 March 2020, he was posthumously awarded the Nishan-e-Kashmir, the highest award of the state, by Prime Minister of Azad Kashmir for his services. Hafiz Hafeezur Rehman, Chief Minister of Gilgit-Baltistan called his death a "national tragedy".

== See also ==
- COVID-19 pandemic in Pakistan
- List of deaths due to COVID-19 pandemic
