= Camille Fischbach =

French footballer (1932–2020)

Personal information
- Date of birth: 20 April 1932
- Place of birth: Stiring-Wendel, France
- Date of death: 19 March 2020 (aged 87)
- Height: 1.75 m (5 ft 9 in)
- Position: Goalkeeper

Youth career
- Stiring Wendel

Senior career*
Years	Team	Apps	(Gls)
1952–1956	1. FC Saarbrücken		
1957–1958	Forbach	39	(0)
1958–1959	Marseille	29	(0)
1959–1960	Metz	18	(0)
- * Club domestic league appearances and goals

Camille Fischbach (20 April 1932 – 19 March 2020) was a French footballer. He played goalkeeper.

== Biography ==
Fischbach played for 1. FC Saarbrücken from 1952 to 1956, who played in the Oberliga Südwest. After a year off from playing following a spinal injury, he joined Forbach in 1957. He then played for Marseille and Metz before retiring in 1960.

Fischbach played 17 matches in Ligue 1 and 64 matches in Ligue 2.
