= Colin Kingsley =

Colin Kingsley (1925–2020) was a British pianist and teacher. Among his many recordings were the piano music of his colleague Kenneth Leighton the composer Alun Hoddinot and John White. He also championed many English Composers from the early twentieth century

Kingsley was a lecturer at the University of Edinburgh Music Faculty where among his pupils were Tanya Ekanayaka and Donald Runnicles "‘Nominally, the hours spent with Colin Kingsley were piano lessons; but in actual fact they were remarkable, holistic musical journeys delving deep into the composer’s intentions, whether melodic, harmonic structural or even orchestral".
