= Leonidas Veliaroutis =

Greek writer (1916–2020)

Leonidas D. Veliaroutis (Greek: Λεωνίδας Δ. Βελιαρούτης; 23 November 1916 – 17 March 2020) was a Greek writer. He was born in Grammeno, Zitsa. He turned 100 in November 2016 and died in March 2020 at the age of 103.

== Works ==
Encyclopedias

- Public School Encyclopedia (Εγκυκλοπαίδεια του Δημοτικού Σχολείου = Egkyklopedia tou Dimotikou Sholeiou)
- O Symvoulos ton neon (Ο Σύμβουλος των νέων = The Youth Council)
- Sholiki Ydria (Σχολική Υδρία)
- Ydria (Υδρία = Jug)

Syntactic team and anthologies:

- Literary Foundations (Λογοτεχνικό Θεμέλιο = Logotechniko themelio)

Works on his studies:

- Lambros Malamas (Λάμπρος Μάλαμας) (1965)
- The environmental studies (Η μελέτη του περιβάλλοντος = I meleti tou perivallontos) (1967)
- To neoelliniko ekpaidevtiko systima) (Το νεοελληνικό εκπαιδευτικό σύστημα = Modern Greek Children's Systrem) (1984)
- Ta pedia ke to logotehniko vivlio (Τα παιδιά και το λογοτεχνικό βιβλίο = The Children and the Literary Book) (1985)
- I techni n' afigoumaste ena paramythi (Η τέχνη ν' αφηγούμαστε ένα παραμύθι = Works That Narrate A Tale) (1991)

Books

- Maria Lamparidou-Pothou - Her Life And Her Works (Μαρία Λαμπαδαρίδου-Πόθου - Η ζωή και το έργο της = Maria Lamparidou-Pothou - I zoi kai to ergo tis) (1995)
- Ipeirotes logotechnes apo to Grammeno (Ηπειρώτες λογοτέχνες από το Γραμμένο = Epirot Writers From Grammeno) (2002)
- I Kalithea (Sarpi) tis Limnou ke i Palelogiki Sholi tis - Limnioi logotehnes (Η Καλλιθέα (Σαρπί) της Λήμνου και η Παλαιολογική Σχολή της – Λήμνιοι λογοτέχνες = Kallithea (Sarpi) on Lemnos and their Paleologiki School - Lemnian Writers) (R. Segkopoulou - N. Viglas - M. Lampadaridou), 2007
