= Raymond Renard =

Belgian linguist (1925–2020)

- Born: 9 March 1925; Saint-Ghislain, Belgium
- Died: 19 March 2020 (aged 95); Mons, Belgium
- Occupation: Writer

Raymond Renard (9 March 1925 – 19 March 2020) was a Belgian writer and linguist who earned a doctorate in philosophy from the Université libre de Bruxelles in 1954.

== Publications ==
- Arthur Cantillon. Sa vie, son œuvre (1958)
- Maurice Maeterlinck et l'Italie. Renommée et influence (1959)
- Points de Départ... Essais de Morale (1960)
- L'enseignement des langues vivantes par la méthode audio-visuelle et structuro globale de St-Cloud-Zagreb (1965)
- Sépharad. Le monde et la langue judéo-espagnole des Séphardim (1966)
- Introduction à la méthode verbo-tonale de correction phonétique (1971)
- Initiation phonétique à l'usage des professeurs de langues (1975)
- La méthodologie SGAV d'enseignement des langues : une problématique d'apprentissage de la parole (1976)
- Foreign language teaching with an integrated methodology (1976)
- De structureel-globale audio-visuele methode (1976)
- Éléments de phonétique (1982)
- Mémento de phonétique à l'usage des professeurs de langues et des orthophonistes (1983)
- Variations sur la problématique SGAV, Essais de didactique des langues (1993)
- Apprentissage d'une langue étrangère/seconde. 2. La phonétique verbo-tonale (2002)
- Structuro-global et verbo-tonal : Variations 1962-2010, Essais de didactique des langues (2010)
- Pour une laïcité universalisable (2014)
