= Alan Finder =

American journalist (1948–2020)

- Born: February 19, 1948. New York City, U.S.
- Died: March 24, 2020 (aged 72); Ridgewood, New Jersey, U.S.
- Education: Valley Stream South High School; University of Rochester (BA); Yale University (MA)
- Occupation: Journalist
- Known for: Longtime employee of the New York Times

Alan Finder (February 19, 1948 – March 24, 2020) was an American journalist. He was a longtime employee of the New York Times. He died during the COVID-19 pandemic from complications brought on by COVID-19. He was 72 years old.

== Early life and education ==
Alan Aaron Finder was born in Brooklyn and raised in Nassau County, New York, graduating from Valley Stream South High School. He earned a B.A. in history at the University of Rochester in 1969 and an M.A. in American studies at Yale University in 1972.

== Career ==
From 1974 to 1979, he worked at The Record in Hackensack, New Jersey, and then until 1983 at Newsday on Long Island. Beginning in 1983, Finder worked for 27 years at the New York Times where he was known for his coverage of local news, government, education, urban affairs, sports, international news and politics. He hosted a roundtable on a local New York TV channel, NY1, during which he would talk to other reporters about the current events. He retired in December 2011.

Times executive editor Dean Baquet described Finder as "one of Metro's stars in the 1980s and 1990s, a big writer in a big, hugely competitive era for New York City news". In retirement, he continued to work as an editor for The Record, Newsday, and on the international desk of the New York Times.

== Personal life ==
He lived in Ridgewood, New Jersey with his wife Elaine. In addition to his wife, Finder left behind a son, Jason Finder, a daughter, Lauren Drucker and a brother, Michael Finder.

== Death ==
Finder died on March 24, 2020, at The Valley Hospital in Ridgewood, New Jersey. He had recently tested positive for COVID-19.
