= Anastasio López Ramírez =

Spanish politician and lawyer (1957 - 2020)

- Born: 17 March 1957; Alcázar de San Juan
- Died: 23 March 2020 (aged 63)
- Known for: Spanish lawyer and Spanish Socialist Workers' Party

Anastasio López Ramírez (17 March 1957 – 23 March 2020) was a Spanish lawyer and Spanish Socialist Workers' Party (PSOE) politician, mayor of Alcázar de San Juan between 1987 and 1995, and member of the Cortes of Castilla-La Mancha between 1983 and 1995.

== Biography and career ==
Anastasio López was born on 17 March 1957 in Alcázar de San Juan, province of Ciudad Real in a railway family and graduated in Laws at the Complutense University of Madrid. He joined the clandestine PSOE in 1975 and became a member of the Socialist Youth while studying for his degree thanks to Fernando Morán's son.

In 1981 he was elected city-councillor of Alcázar de San Juan and mayor in the 1987 local elections, office he held until 1995. He stood out as mayor for modernizing the town, the construction of large facilities and infrastructure and the construction and modernization of neighborhoods. He was a member of the Provincial Deputation of Ciudad Real from 1979 to 1987, and was vice-president of this institution from 1983 to 1987. In 1995 was named Delegate of the Regional Government of Castile-La Mancha in the province of Ciudad Real and later Director of the Cabinet of the Parliament of Castilla-La Mancha in 1997 until 2006.

On 2 February 1989, recovering from a leg operation at the Hospital Clínico in Madrid, he was taken by ambulance to the Cortes, in Toledo, to prevent the PSOE from losing the vote on the regional development plan.

He retired from politics in 2006 after suffering a stroke and returned to the practice of law in his hometown.

== Personal life and death ==
He was married with whom he had two daughters, and grandfather of two grandchildren. He loved sports and was a fan of Atlético de Madrid.

Anastasio López was admitted at the hospital La Mancha Centro in Alcázar de San Juan on 21 March 2020 affected by COVID-19 during the pandemic in Spain. He died the following Monday, on 23 March, at the age of 63.
