= Joe Ferebee =

American baseball player (1919–2020)

Joseph Starrette Ferebee (February 24, 1919 – March 18, 2020) was an athletic director and baseball coach at Pfeiffer University. He won 667 games with Pfeiffer University and 694 with American Legion teams.

A Mocksville, North Carolina native, Ferebee graduated from and played for Mocksville High School along with his cousin Tom Ferebee, who participated in the bombing of Hiroshima. Joe Ferebee was married to Melba Willis Ferebee from 1952 until her death in 2004. They had four children.

Ferebee had three American legion state championships. After serving in the navy, he began his coaching career at Salisbury High School in 1947, taking the school to a 3A state title in 1955. Ferebee was elected to eight Halls of Fame: North Carolina Hall of Fame, Catawba College, National Association of Intercollegiate Athletics and Stanly County.

Ferebee coached at Pfeiffer University, which has named its baseball field Joe Ferebee Field, from 1958 to 1987. He led the Falcons to 10 conference championships and five NAIA District crowns. He also led Pfeiffer to the national finals one season and the 1968 Pfeiffer team was ranked number 2 in the nation.

Ferebee held the record for most American Legion games won from 1989 until May 30, 2015. He died on March 18, 2020, at the age of 101.
