= Wallace Scobie =

Scottish footballer (1934–2020)

Personal information
- Full name: Wallace Duncan Smith Scobie
- Date of birth: 31 January 1934
- Place of birth: Paisley, Scotland
- Date of death: 20 March 2020 (aged 86)
- Place of death: Edinburgh, Scotland
- Position: Outside right

Senior career*
Years	Team	Apps	(Gls)
- Coats Amateurs
1956–1957	Queen's Park	3	(0)

International career
1958	Scotland Amateurs	1	(0)
- * Club domestic league appearances and goals

Wallace Duncan Smith Scobie (31 January 1934 – 12 March 2020) was a Scottish amateur football right back who played in the Scottish League for Queen's Park. He was capped by Scotland at amateur level. Scobie died in Edinburgh on 12 March 2020, at the age of 86.
