= Piero Schlesinger =

Italian jurist and banker (1930–2020)

Piero Schlesinger Knight Grand Cross OMRI
- Born: 19 May 1930; Naples, Italy
- Died: 14 March 2020 (aged 89); Milan, Italy
- Education: University of Turin
- Occupations: Jurist, banker, lawyer, academic
- Spouse: Claudia Artoni (died 2012)
- Children: 2

Piero Schlesinger Knight Grand Cross OMRI (19 May 1930 – 14 March 2020) was an Italian jurist, banker, lawyer and academic who served as president of the Banca Popolare di Milano from 1971 to 1993.

== Career ==
Piero Schlesinger graduated in jurisprudence in Turin. In 1956, he began his academic career at the University of Urbino and, two years later, personally chosen by its dean and founder Father Agostino Gemelli, moved to the Università Cattolica del Sacro Cuore of Milan, where he held the chair of private law for over three decades.

Manuale di diritto privato, the academic textbook of private law he co-authored with Andrea Torrente, is considered one of the most studied and influential of its kind in Italy. Among his pupils were lawyers Giuseppe Lombardi and Franco Anelli.

Alongside his academic commitments, Schlesinger continued to practice both civil and corporate law, and held important positions in Italian banking institutions. He joined the board of directors of the Banca Popolare di Milano following the shareholders' meeting of March 14, 1964. In 1971, he succeeded Guido Jarach as the head of the institute, becoming president on March 13. He held its position continuously until 1993, except for a short time period between 1980 and 1981, during which he served as president of the Istituto Mobiliare Italiano, while being replaced by Luigi Frey. Il Sole 24 Ore wrote that during his presidency, the longest-serving in BMP's history, Schlesinger "made the institution [...] a key benchmark of Lombardy's economy".

In September 1982, he was appointed by Giovanni Bazoli, then head of the Nuovo Banco Ambrosiano, as president of La Centrale Finanziaria Generale, formerly owned by infamous banker Roberto Calvi. In 1996 he was appointed board member of the Gemina holding, resigning after just 17 days.

== Personal life and death ==
Schlesinger had a lifelong marriage with child psychotherapist Claudia Artoni, with whom he had two children.

He died from complications related to COVID-19 on 14 March 2020, aged 89, at the Policlinico of Milan, where he had been hospitalized 10 days before for unrelated health reasons.

== Honours and awards ==
- Italy: Knight Grand Cross of the Order of Merit of the Italian Republic (22 January 1976)
- Italy: Italian Medal of Merit for Culture, School and Art (2 July 1979)
