= Ted Monette =

American army officer (1945–2020)

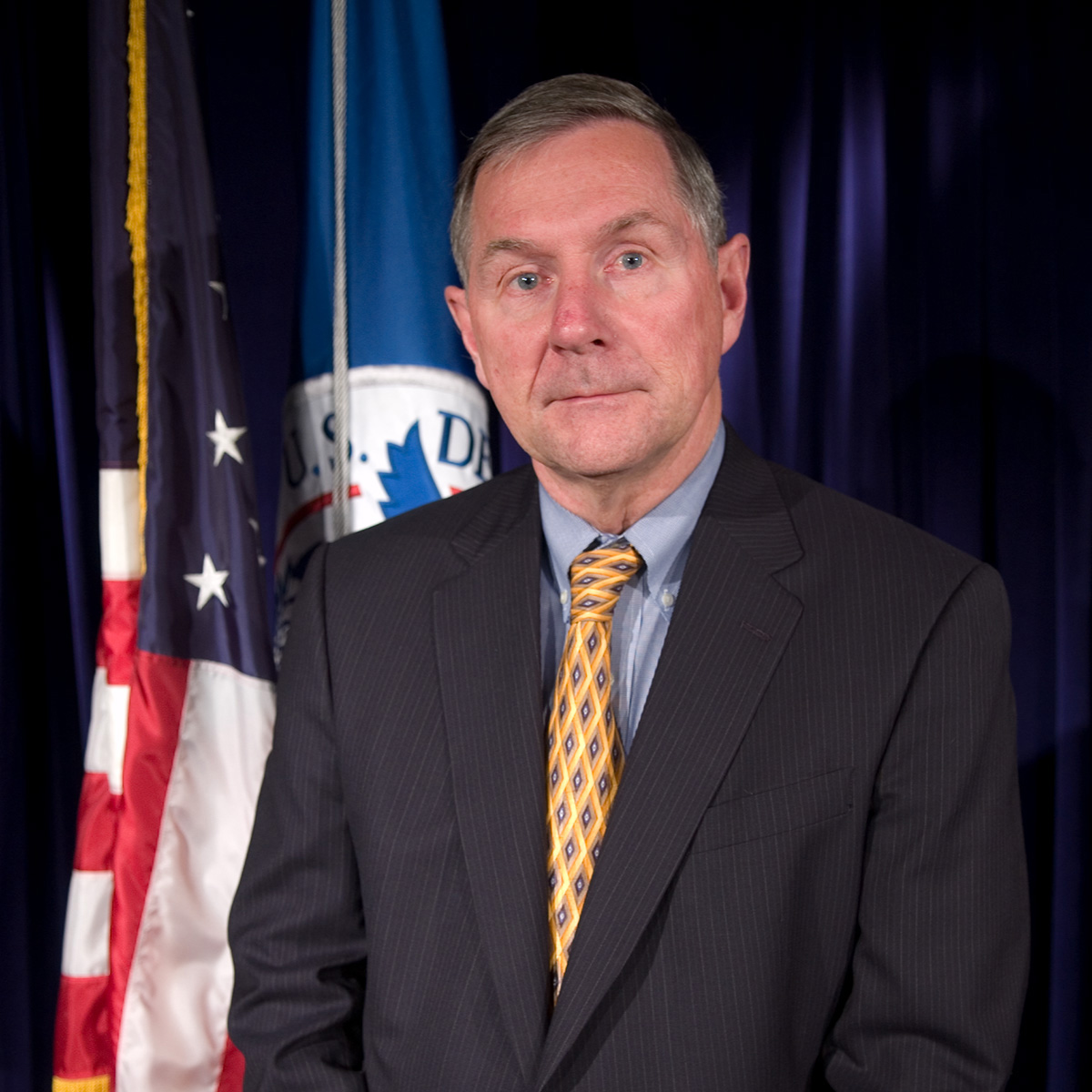
- Portrait of Ted Monette
- Born: December 31, 1945; Springfield, Massachusetts
- Died: March 30, 2020 (aged 74); Holyoke, Massachusetts
- Military career
- Rank: colonel

Theodore A. Monette Jr. (December 31, 1945 – March 30, 2020) was an American army colonel who had served as FEMA director of the Office of Federal Coordinating Officer Operations.

== Life ==
Monette was a graduate of the University of Massachusetts in Amherst. He joined the Federal Emergency Management Agency after serving 30 years in the U.S. Army. He was the senior federal official in charge of response and recovery operations after the 2001 September 11 attack on New York City. He also guided the response and relief effort after Hurricane Katrina and Hurricane Rita. Monette was a veteran of the Vietnam War and the Persian Gulf wars.

He died after testing positive for COVID-19 during the COVID-19 pandemic in Massachusetts. Monette also had Parkinson's disease. He was buried at the Massachusetts Memorial Veteran's Cemetery in Agawam on April 7, 2020.
