= Ellis D. Parker =

United States Army general (1932–2020)

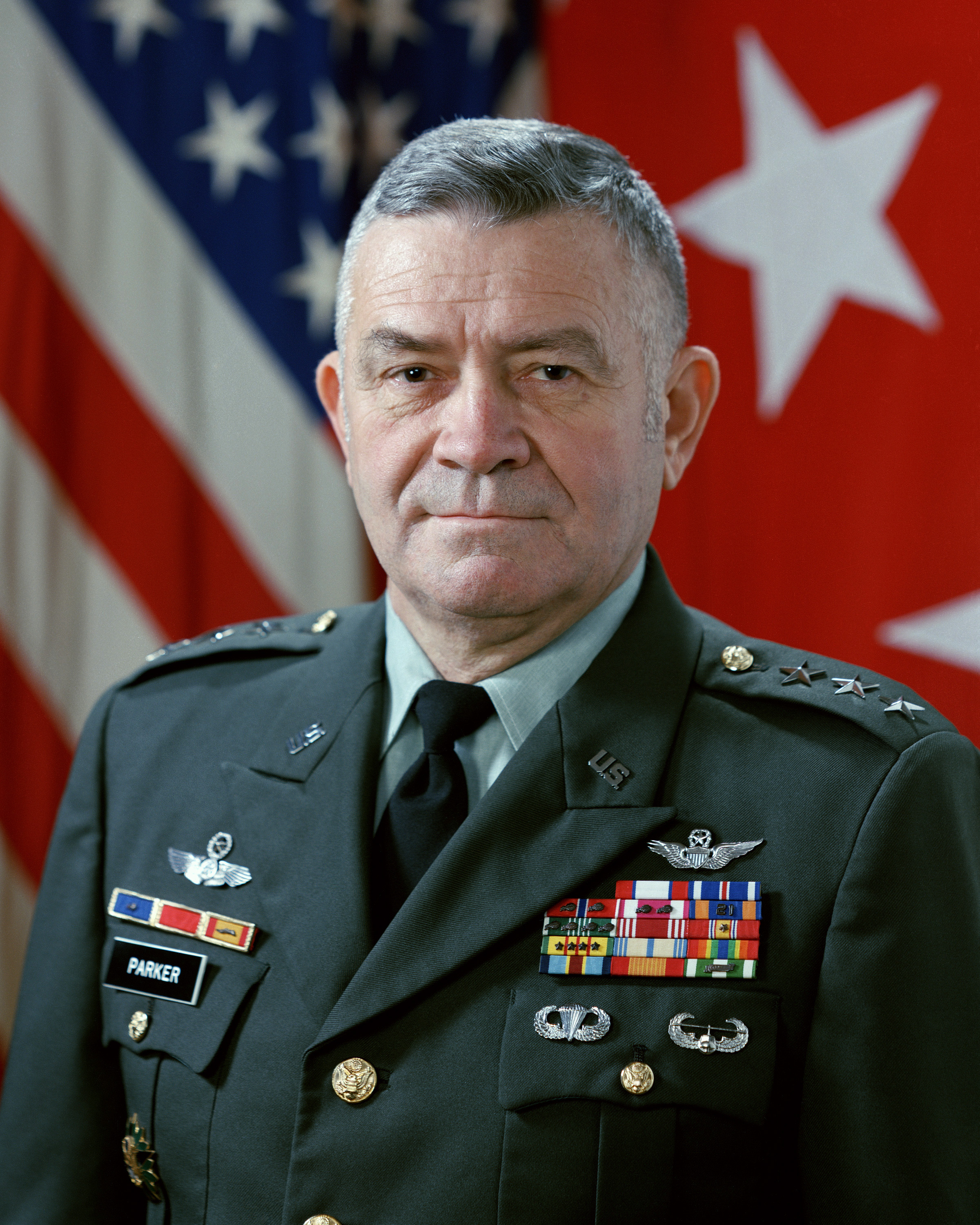
- Born: September 10, 1932; Sadlersville, Tennessee, US
- Died: March 26, 2020 (aged 87); Enterprise, Alabama, US
- Military career
- Allegiance: United States
- Branch: United States Army
- Service years: 1957–1996
- Rank: Lieutenant general
- Nickname: Don
- Commands: Army Aviation Center, Director of Army Staff
- Conflicts: Vietnam War
- Awards: Distinguished Service Medal [2], Distinguished Flying Cross, Legion of Merit, Bronze Star [4], Air Medal [21], Army Commendation Medal [5]

Ellis Donald Parker (November 1, 1932 – March 26, 2020) was a lieutenant general in the United States Army. LTG Ellis D. Parker, Don, was commissioned in the Army in 1957 as the Distinguished Honour Graduate from the Field Artillery Officer Candidate School. He holds a BS Degree in Psychology, a MS Degree in Public Administration and an Honorary Doctorate of Laws. In addition he graduated from both the Command and General Staff College and the Army War College. Don became an Army Aviator early in his career. [Among many other command positions,] he was Assistant Division Commander of the world's only Air Assault Division, the 101st, at Ft. Campbell, KY.
