= Lee Guittar =

American newspaper executive (1931–2020)

- Born: LeRoy John Guittar; May 4, 1931; St. Louis, Missouri, U.S.
- Died: March 26, 2020 (aged 88); Fort Lauderdale, Florida, U.S
- Education: Columbia University (BA)
- Occupation: Publisher
- Employer: Hearst Corporation
- Known for: Publisher of the San Francisco Examiner, The Denver Post, Dallas Times Herald

Lee John Guittar (May 4, 1931 – March 26, 2020) was an American newspaper executive at Hearst corporation and former publisher of the San Francisco Examiner, The Denver Post, Dallas Times Herald, and president of USA Today and Detroit Free Press.

== Biography ==
Guittar was born LeRoy John Guittar on May 4, 1931, in South St. Louis. His father was a machinist. A star basketball and baseball player in high school, Guittar was drafted by St. Louis Browns, but decided to attend Columbia University on a ROTC scholarship, and was a member of the 1950-1951 basketball team that captured the Ivy League title and made it to the NCAA Division I men's basketball tournament. He graduated in 1953, Phi Beta Kappa.

After graduation, Guittar served in the United States Navy and worked as a communications officer on the destroyer USS Hale. He landed his first job at General Electric and worked ten years before joining the Miami Herald as personnel director, and was later promoted to circulation director. In 1972, he jointed Detroit Free Press, where he spent two years as vice-president and three years as president. He later served as chairman, publisher, and chief executive of Dallas Times Herald until 1981. He simultaneously held the post of group vice president at Times Mirror Company and spearheaded the company's $85 million purchase of The Denver Post in late 1980, and subsequently served as the Post's publisher and chief executive for three years. Under his leadership, he helped increase the sales and revamped the content of both the Herald and the Post and transformed them into morning newspapers. He also established himself as a local celebrity in Denver with his TV appearances and was named "publisher of the year" in 1982, just only one year into the job.

In 1984, Guittar joined Gannett as president of USA Today. He was later hired by Hearst corporation in 1986 as group vice president overseeing its nationwide publications and supervised a short-lived joint venture between Hearst and Russian newspaper Izvestia. In 1995, he succeeded William Randolph Hearst III as editor and publisher of the San Francisco Examiner and retired from the company in 1998. His last journalism piece, was an article published in the Examiner about the 1999 John F. Kennedy Jr. plane crash, in which he drew on his own experiences as a licensed pilot.

== Personal life ==
Guittar married his high school sweetheart, Joan Mayo, and the two had five children between 1953-1960. After 28 years of marriage and many moves across the country, the marriage ended in divorce. Joan died in 2022 after a brief stay in a memory care center. In 1980, he was remarried to Elizabeth Madden Shedrick, who died in 2019. He raised three children from Shedrick’s previous marriage, and were long-time residents of Martha's Vineyard. He died on March 26, 2020, at his home in Fort Lauderdale, Florida, of natural causes and is survived by his eight children, 22 grandchildren, and 9 great-grandchildren.
