= Adam Showman =

American planetary scientist

- Born: October 9, 1968; Palo Alto, California
- Died: March 16, 2020 (aged 51); Tucson, Arizona
- Education: Stanford University; California Institute of Technology
- Known for: Research on the atmospheric dynamics of exoplanets
- Awards: Galileo Circle Fellow, University of Arizona (2018); Fellow of the American Geophysical Union (2019)
- Scientific career
- Fields: Planetary science
- Workplaces: Lunar and Planetary Laboratory of the University of Arizona
- Thesis: Atmospheric dynamics of giant planets (1999)

Adam P. Showman (October 9, 1968 – March 16, 2020) was a planetary scientist and professor at the Lunar and Planetary Laboratory of the University of Arizona. He was known for his research on the atmospheric dynamics of exoplanets, which has been the paradigm for hot gas giant atmospheric circulation models, and recognized as the world's leading authority in the field of atmospheric dynamics of exoplanets.

== Early life and education ==
Showman was born on October 9, 1968, in Palo Alto, California. He studied physics at Stanford University, where he earned a B.S. in 1991. He earned a Ph.D. at California Institute of Technology in 1999, with a dissertation on the atmosphere of Jupiter and the geophysics of its largest moon, Ganymede.

== Career ==
After two postdoctoral positions at the University of Louisville and NASA Ames. His postdoctoral work included 3D numerical modeling of giant planets, and was used to explain flows around Jupiter’s hotspots discovered by the Galileo probe. Showman joined the Lunar and Planetary Laboratory at the University of Arizona as an assistant professor in 2001. He was named full professor in 2012. He was also a Galileo Circle Fellow of the University of Arizona (2018) and a Fellow of the American Geophysical Union (2019).

Showman directly advised 11 graduate students and mentored many more across the disciplines of planetary science, atmospheric sciences, and geosciences. He was known as a dedicated teacher and was passionate about explaining the complicated details of planetary physics to his students. He developed eight courses in planetary sciences, including two graduate courses.

== Research ==
Showman's early research on the atmospheric dynamics of exoplanets demonstrated that the difference between the day and night side on hot Jupiters would drive strong eastward equatorial winds, comparable to or greater than the speed of sound in the medium. This work shaped the field and was spectacularly verified in subsequent observations. Showman and his collaborators went on to extend their innovative models beyond hot gas giant planets, to tidally-locked and fast-rotating planets of smaller sizes and cooler temperatures as well as to larger and warmer brown dwarfs.

== Professional activities ==
Showman was deeply involved in the exoplanet science community and collaborated with many observers to interpret their observations of exoplanet atmospheres and working with theorists to advance modeling techniques. Some of his works appear in major exoplanet resources
