= V. V. Veeder =

V. V. "Johnny" Veeder QC (1948 – 8 March 2020) was an English barrister and arbitration specialist.
