= Alan Fanning =

Australian rules footballer (1932–2020)

Personal information
- Full name: Alan Frederick Fanning
- Born: 14 December 1932
- Died: 14 March 2020 (aged 87)
- Original team: Kew Amateurs
- Height: 182 cm (6 ft 0 in)
- Weight: 82 kg (181 lb)

Playing career^{1}
Years	Club	Games (Goals)
1954–1955	Hawthorn	12 (6)
- ^{1} Playing statistics correct to the end of 1955.

Alan Fanning (14 December 1932 – 14 March 2020) was an Australian rules footballer who played for the Hawthorn Football Club in the Victorian Football League (VFL).

== Honours and achievements ==
Individual

- Hawthorn life member
