= Antonio Álvarez Solís =

Spanish journalist (1929–2020)

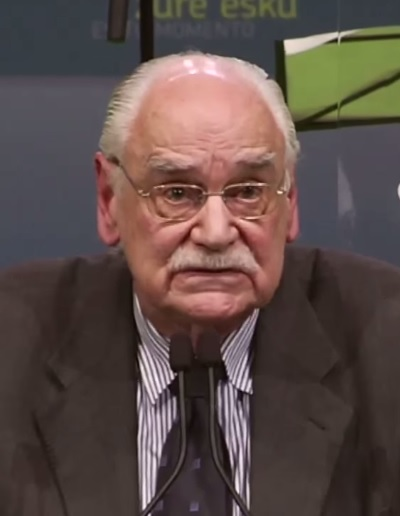
Álvarez Solís in 2012

Antonio Álvarez Méndez, better known as Antonio Álvarez Solís (Madrid, July 18, 1929 - March 30, 2020), was a Spanish journalist.

== Biography ==
He started working for the newspaper La Vanguardia where he became editor aged 27. Later he was founding director of magazine Interviú and was one of the founders of the satirical magazine Por Favor in 1974. He was a collaborator of several televisions and radio stations at national and regional level.

In his last years he collaborated with the Gara and Deia newspapers.

He died on March 30, 2020.

== Work ==
- Qué es el búnker. Barcelona: La Gaya Ciencia, 1976. ISBN 9788470809514.
- Divorcio, recta final. Barcelona: Ediciones Actuales, 1977. ISBN 8485286685.
- El año que va a pasar. Bitácora, 1990. ISBN 9788486832650.
- Verte desnuda. Madrid: Temas de Hoy, 1992. ISBN 9788478801558.
- Jóvenes de corazón: la utilidad de la vejez. Barcelona: Martínez Roca, 2000. ISBN 9788427025448.
- Cartas a Euskadi: dos años en el micrófono. Madrid: Foca, Ediciones y Distribuciones Generales, 2003. ISBN 9788495440419.
- Horas sin tiempo. Bilbao: Euskal Irrati Telebista (EITB), 2007. ISBN 9788493600556.
- Así veo Euskal Herria. Gara, 2009. ISBN 9788495663894.
- Mujeres, ultramarinos y coloniales. Txalaparta, 2010. ISBN 9788481365856.
- Crisis del periodismo: la información y la calle. Nafarroa: Erein, 2012. ISBN 9788497467445.
- Él, historia de una amistad. Círculo Rojo, 2017. ISBN 9788491608585.
