= Denise Millet =

French comic book artist (1933–2020)

- Born: 15 May 1933
- Died: 28 March 2020 (aged 86)
- Occupations: Illustrator, comic book artist

Denise Millet (French: [dəniz mijɛ]; 15 May 1933 – 28 March 2020) was a French illustrator and comic book artist. She worked with her husband, Claude Millet.

== Biography ==
The works of Denise and Claude Millet spanned from 1976 to 2019 and included nearly 200 titles. The pair collaborated with Bayard Presse, and designed the comic strip Pic et Pik, written by Stéphanie Janicot. They also drew a biographical comic of Martin Luther King Jr., written by Benoît Marchon.

Besides comics, Millet worked in advertising, communication, and cinema. She, along with Claude, designed the poster for I Hate Actors (1986), which was nominated for the César Award for Best Poster.

Denise Millet died on 28 March 2020 at the age of 86 in Lariboisière Hospital, Paris, due to COVID-19.
