= Lance James =

South African country singer and radio broadcaster (1938–2020)

- Also known as: "Big Daddy"
- Born: Lance James Liebenberg; July 18, 1938; Germiston, South Africa
- Died: March 2, 2020 (aged 81) Johannesburg, South Africa
- Genres: Country
- Occupations: Singer, radio host
- Website: lancejames.co.za

Lance James (18 July 1938 – 2 March 2020) was a South African country singer and radio broadcaster (Springbok Radio, 1954–1985). Some of his hits include Thank You, Vicki and Ahoy, Madagascar Ahoy !. During Huisgenoot's 2009 Skouspel he (along with nine other singers) was honored for their lifelong contribution to Afrikaans and South African music.

== Early life ==
Lance James Liebenberg was born 1938 in Germiston on the East Rand of Johannesburg. He married Valerie Mary Wilson and they had two children Chanel Liebenberg and Dionne Liebenberg.

== Career ==
He worked at the SABC on Springbok Radio from 1954 until 1985. At the radio station, he was a presenter on two shows, Keep it Country on Sundays and Munt uit Musiek.

An autobiography, Dankie by Francois van Oudtshoorn was published in 2015. His final album came out in 2019, called Swan Song.

== Death ==
Suffering from heart problems and other aged health issues, he was admitted to a Johannesburg hospital in 2020. There he broke a hip and would later pass away from an infection after hip surgery, several weeks in hospital. He is survived by his two daughters Chanel and Dionne, three grandchildren Tyron, Declan and Lilly-Joy, son-in-law's Glenn Floyd and Benjy Mudie, business partner Mara van der Burgh and partner Eunice Wait

== Honours ==
In 2019, he was honoured for his life work by Federasie van Afrikaanse Kulturvereniginge. Other awards include a Beeld Award for contribution to Afrikaans music, a Solidarity Award, six Sarie Awards and several awards for "Best Album of the Year", and a Life Time Achievement Award. On 26 January 2020, Lance was also inaugurated as a living legend in the South African Legends Museum. He was one of only 20 legends from whom a bust was also made.
