= Bob Myers (footballer) =

Australian rules footballer (1930–2020)

Personal information
- Full name: Robert Henley Myers
- Born: 29 November 1930
- Died: 18 March 2020 (aged 89)
- Original team: St Kilda Rovers
- Height: 180 cm (5 ft 11 in)
- Weight: 76 kg (168 lb)

Playing career^{1}
Years	Club	Games (Goals)
1953–54	St Kilda	8 (0)
1961–64	Sorrento	70 (117)
- ^{1} Playing statistics correct to the end of 1954.

Career highlights
- 1962 and 1964 leading goal kicker, 1964 premiership

Robert Henley Myers (29 November 1930 – 18 March 2020) was an Australian rules footballer who played with St Kilda in the Victorian Football League (VFL). Myers arrived at Sorrento FC on the Mornington Peninsula in 1961, aged 30, using his grand mother's sobriquet of Mick. In his 70 matches over four seasons (1961–64), he led the goal kicking twice (53 in 1962 and 64 in 1963) and received a premiership medal once (1964). He also played in the Trobe Valley.
