= Horace Hardwick =

American politician (1935–2020)

Member of the Arkansas House of Representatives from the 99th district
- In office January 13, 2003 – January 12, 2009
- Preceded by: Arnell Willis
- Succeeded by: Tim Summers

Personal details
- Born: September 19, 1935 San Antonio, Texas, U.S.
- Died: March 25, 2020 (aged 84) Bentonville, Arkansas, U.S.
- Party: Republican

Horace Hardwick (September 19, 1935 – March 25, 2020) was an American politician who served in the Arkansas House of Representatives from the 99th district from 2003 to 2009.

He died on March 25, 2020, in Bentonville, Arkansas at age 84.
