= Gian Carlo Ceruti =

Italian sports executive (1952–2020)

Gian Carlo Ceruti (2 July 1952 – 31 March 2020) was an Italian sports executive and trade unionist, president of the Italian Cycling Federation from 1997 to 2005.

== Career ==
Born in Pianengo in 1952, Ceruti joined the Cremona section of the Italian Federation of Metalworkers and of the Italian General Confederation of Labour in 1976; he was a trade unionist for twenty years, becoming among the leaders of FIOM and CGIL in his region. At the same time, he devoted himself to sports from a very young age. In 1993 he was elected as Federal Councilor of the Italian Cycling Federation and from 1995 to 1997 he served as Deputy Vice President; from 1997 to 2005 he was Federal President of the Italian Cycling Federation. He was also a member of the Italian National Olympic Committee and of the World Anti-Doping Commission of the Union Cycliste Internationale, and National Councilor of the Istituto del Credito Sportivo. In 1996 he was awarded the Golden Collar (Collare d'oro) of the Italian Olympic Committee for his merits as sports executive.

Thrice graduated in philosophy, political science and anthropology, he wrote several essays on cycling and on the phenomenon of immigration: Il ciclismo dalla Sicilia alla Toscana. Antropologia di una migrazione (2013), Tra passione e realtà. Antropologia di una cultura ciclistica (2013), Migrazioni contemporanee. Il viaggio di un antropologo in bicicletta (2017).

Ceruti died in the hospital of Crema on 31 March 2020, aged 67, of COVID-19 complications, during the pandemic in Italy.
