= Borja Domecq Solís =

Spanish rancher (1945–2020)

Borja Domecq Solís, born Francisco de Borja Domecq y Solís (October 1945 – 23 March 2020) was a Spanish businessman and breeder of fighting bulls, founder of the Vegahermosa and Jandilla bull ranches.

== Biography ==
He was born in October 1945 in Pamplona into one of the most prominent families of the cattle and winery lineage Domecq. The son of Juan Pedro Domecq Díez and Matilde Solís Beaumont, grandson of breeder and winemaker Juan Pedro Domecq and Nuñez de Villavicencio forerunner of the Domecq bull ranch, and brother of Fernando and Juan Pedro Domecq, also breeders of fighting bulls, he grew up in Jerez de la Frontera, their parents' place of origin.

He was the owner of the Domecq herd located on the farm that the family owns in Vejer de la Frontera (Cadiz), recognized by the family iron star created in 1943. He continued the genetics studies initiated by his father and his uncles Pedro, Salvador and Álvaro Domecq in the 1950s, pioneers in the genetic improvement of the Domecq bulls.

After the bull ranch Zalduendo was created by his brother Fernando, in 1987 he took the direction of part of it from which he formed his own ranch, Jandilla, placing it among leading Spanish bull ranches, announced in most of the most important bullfighting fairs for more than thirty years. In 2016 he handed over the management to his son Borja Domecq Nogera.

In 2002, he created a second bull ranch, Vegahermosa, with genetics from Domecq bulls. From 2011 to 2017 he was part of the board of directors of the Unión de Criadores de Toros de Lidia, as well as the promoter and the President of Fedelidia, a federation that includes the five breeder associations dedicated to the production of meat from fighting bull of autochthonous breed, a certificate of traceability granted by the Ministry of Agriculture in Royal Decree 505/2013 of June 25, which includes more than a thousand cattle ranches.

== Personal life ==
Domecq was married to Fátima Noguera Espinosa, from whose marriage he had two children, Borja and Fátima.

In 2009, while attending the awards ceremony of the Extremadura Bullfighting Federation, he suffered acute pulmonary edema, for which he was admitted to the ICU of the local hospital.

He died on 23 March 2020 at age 74 in the General Hospital of Mérida, the day after being admitted, as a consequence of COVID-19, during the pandemic in Spain.
