= Pasquale Russo Maresca =

Italian painter (1968–2020)

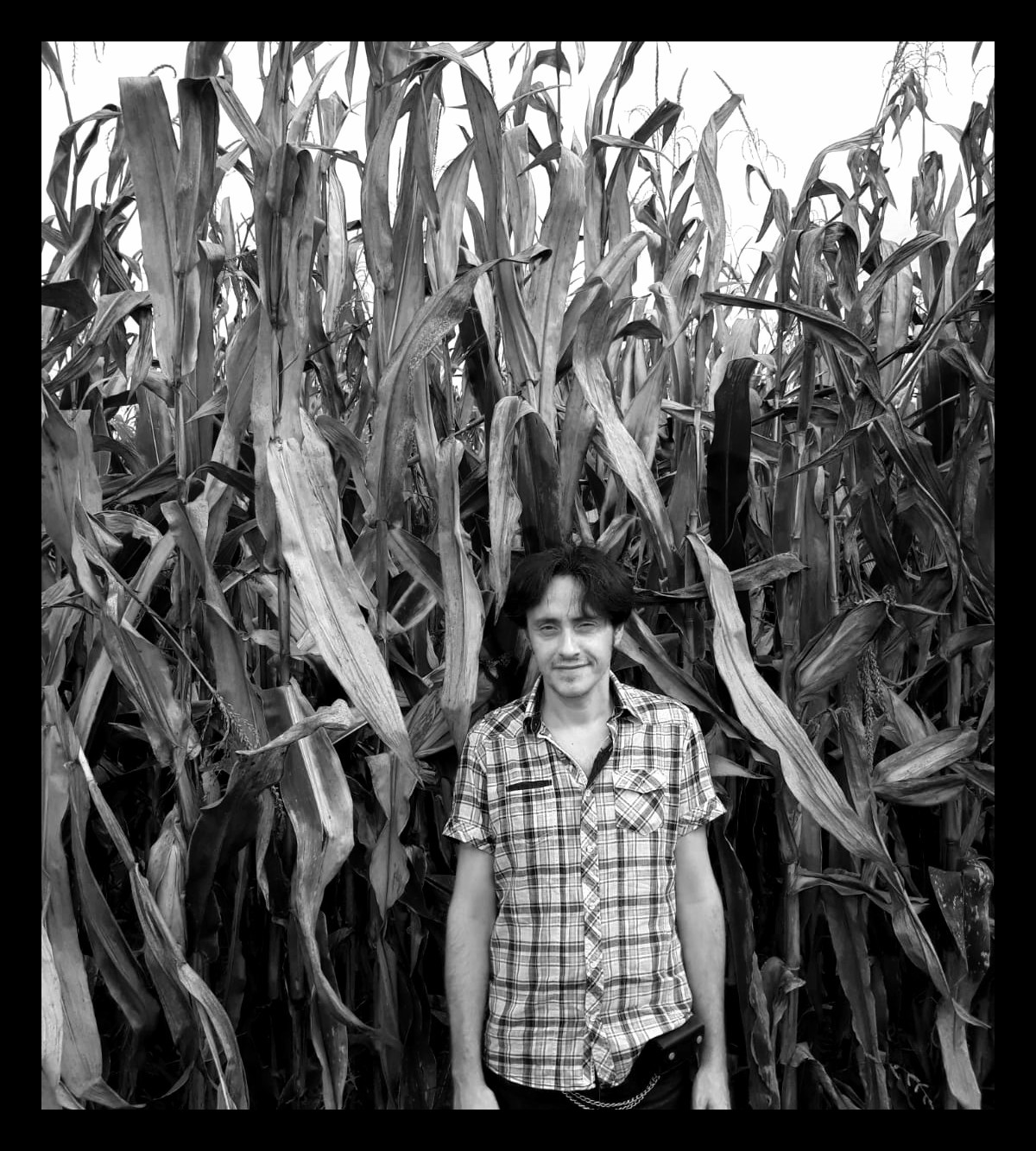
Pasquale Russo Maresca in Oaxaca, Mexico, in 2018.

Pasquale Russo Maresca (20 July 1968 – 22 March 2020) was an Italian painter best known for his work and research focusing on anatomy, especially the composition of the human face. Maresca sought to explore the anatomical features of the face within his paintings by reconstructing the face and inserting illusion into it. He called this technique "Sette settimi di volto". He divided his professional time between Italy, Mexico, where he lived in Mexico City, and Slovakia.

Maresca was born in Milan, Italy, on 20 July 1968.

Maresca became known for his religious work in the 1990s and 2000s. In 1995, Maresca was commissioned to create a depiction of the crucifixion of Andrew the Apostle for Sant'Andrea church in Pioltello. He then painted the crucifixion of Christ for the same church in 1996. In 1997, Maresca was commissioned to paint the altar scene, as well as fresco of the dome for a cemetery in Trezzo sull'Adda. In 2000, he completed a painting of the Visitation for the church in Locate Varesino. He held a solo show showcasing his paintings of the human face at the Montrasio gallery in Milan in 2004.

Maresca died from brain cancer in Brescia, Italy, on 22 March 2020, at the age of 51. He was survived by his wife, Barbara Luraghi, whom he married in 2000.
