= Military career of Dwight D. Eisenhower =

Dwight D. Eisenhower
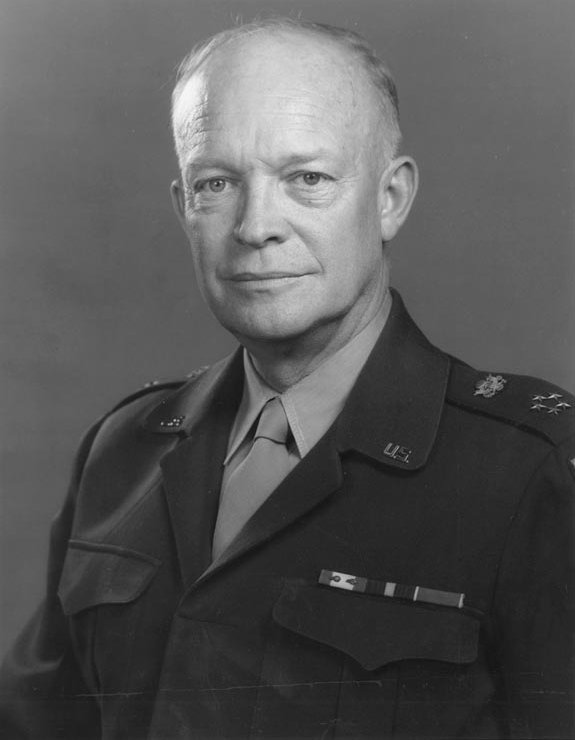
- Official portrait, 1947
- Born: 14 October 1890; Denison, Texas, US
- Died: 28 March 1969 (aged 78); Washington, D.C., US
- Military career
- Allegiance: United States
- Branch: United States Army
- Service years: 1915 – 1953; 1961 – 1969
- Rank: General of the Army
- Nickname: Ike
- Commands: Supreme Allied Commander Europe; Chief of Staff of the United States Army; Military Governor of the U.S. Occupation Zone in Germany; Supreme Commander Allied Expeditionary Force in Western Europe; Commanding General, European Theater of Operations; Commander-in-Chief, Allied Forces in North Africa
- Conflicts: See battles Mexican Border Service World War I World War II: Battle of the Mediterranean; North African campaign; Operation Torch; Battle of Port Lyautey; Tunisian campaign; Allied invasion of Sicily; Allied invasion of Italy; Western Front; Western Allied invasion of France; Operation Overlord; Normandy landings; Allied advance from Paris to the Rhine; Battle of the Bulge; Western Allied invasion of Germany
- Awards: Navy Distinguished Service Medal; Army Distinguished Service Medal (5); Legion of Merit
- Other work: President of Columbia University, NY; President of the United States of America

The military career of Dwight D. Eisenhower began in June 1911, when Eisenhower took the oath as a cadet at the United States Military Academy in West Point, New York. Ike commissioned as a second lieutenant in the United States Army in June 1915, as part of "the class the stars fell on". He rose through the ranks over the next thirty years and became one of the most important Allied generals of World War II, being promoted to General of the Army in 1944. Eisenhower retired from the military after winning the 1952 presidential election, though his rank as General of the Army was restored by an act of Congress in March 1961.

After graduating from the United States Military Academy in 1915, Eisenhower was assigned to the 19th Infantry Regiment at Fort Sam Houston. He served in the continental United States throughout World War I, ending the war as the commander of a battalion that trained tank crews. After the war, he served as part of a Transcontinental Motor Convoy that traveled across the continental United States. In 1922, he was transferred to the Panama Canal Zone, where he served under General Fox Conner. He then served on the American Battle Monuments Commission under the command of General John J. Pershing. In 1929, he became the executive officer to General George Van Horn Moseley, who served on the staff of Assistant Secretary of War Frederick Huff Payne. In 1935, Eisenhower accompanied General Douglas MacArthur to the Philippines, where they served as military advisers charged with developing the Philippine Army. Eisenhower returned to the United States in 1939 and took part in the Louisiana Maneuvers as the chief of staff to General Walter Krueger.

After the United States entered World War II, General George C. Marshall assigned Eisenhower to the War Plans Division in Washington, D.C. Eisenhower became the commander of American forces in Britain in June 1942 and was assigned to lead Operation Torch, the Allied invasion of French North Africa. After the success of Operation Torch, Eisenhower led the successful Allied invasion of Tunisia, forcing the surrender of all Axis forces in May 1943. Eisenhower led the opening phases of the Italian campaign, but was subsequently assigned to lead the Allied invasion of Western Europe in December 1943. He served as the supreme commander of Operation Overlord, the Allied invasion of Normandy, and took command of subsequent operations in France. Following the success of Operation Overlord, the Allies quickly took control of much of Western Europe, but the Germans launched a major counter-attack in the Battle of the Bulge. German resistance quickly collapsed following the Allied victory in that battle, and Eisenhower accepted the surrender of Germany in May 1945.

After the war, Eisenhower served as the commander of the American zone of occupation in Germany. In November 1945, he succeeded Marshall as the chief of staff of the United States Army. Eisenhower left active duty in 1948 to become the president of Columbia University, but rejoined the army in 1951 to become the first supreme commander of NATO. He left the army once again in 1952 to run for President of the United States; his presidential candidacy was successful and he served as president from January 1953 to January 1961.

== Early years, 1915–1918 ==
Eisenhower graduated with the United States Military Academy's class of 1915, "the class the stars fell on", ranked 61st in a class of 164. A knee injured playing football and aggravated while horseback riding that could have caused the government to later give Eisenhower a medical discharge and disability pension, almost caused the army not to commission him after graduation. This was acceptable to Eisenhower, who was curious about gaucho life and began planning a trip to Argentina. West Point's chief medical officer offered to recommend him for a commission in the Coast Artillery, but Eisenhower viewed it as offering "a minimum of excitement" and preferred to become a civilian. The doctor then offered to recommend Eisenhower for a commission if he agreed not to seek appointment to the Cavalry. Eisenhower intended to become an Infantry officer, so he readily agreed. Because of the injury, West Point's academic board recommended against commissioning Eisenhower, but the doctor interceded successfully with the War Department and Eisenhower was commissioned as a second lieutenant in September 1915.

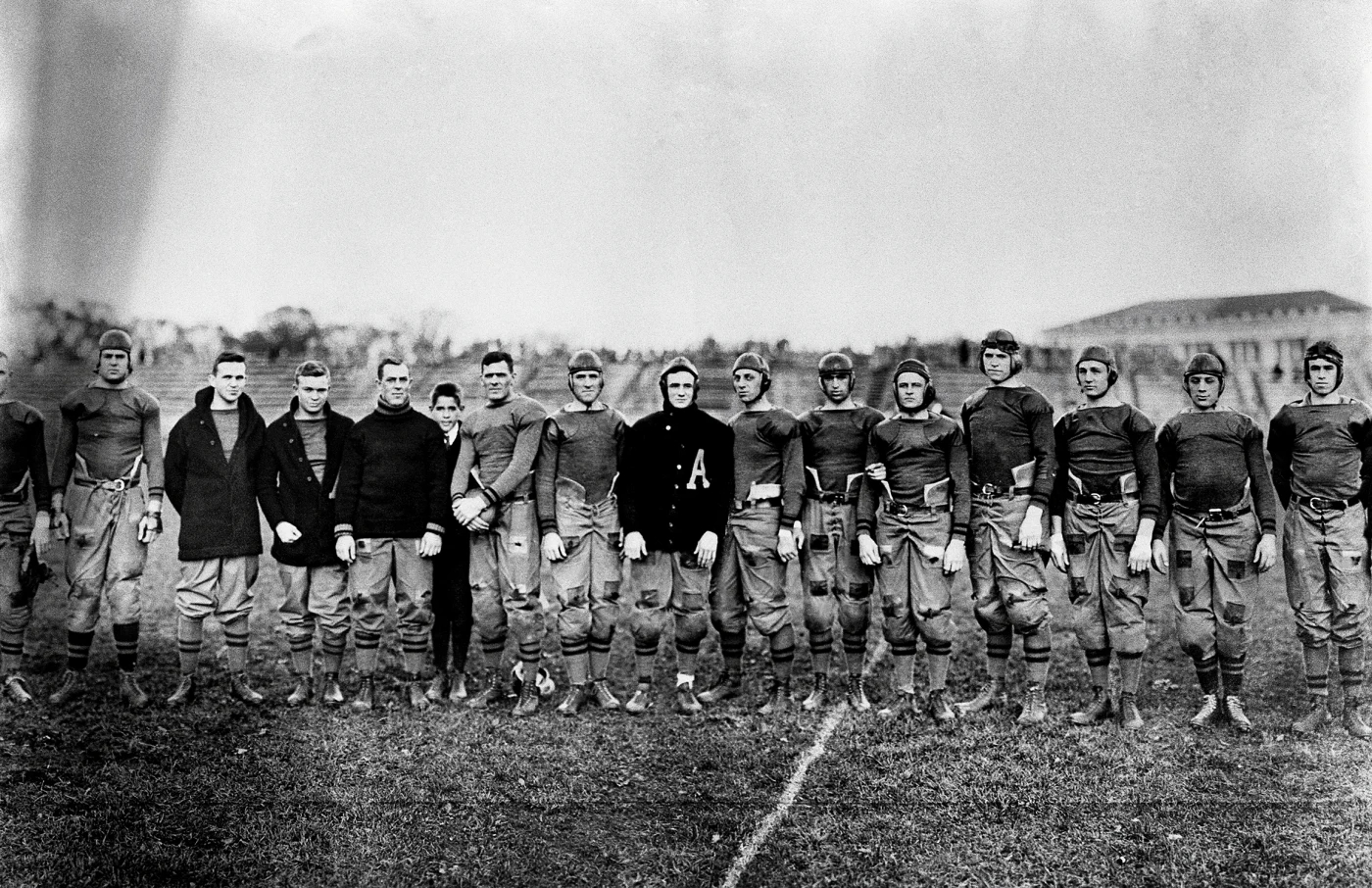
The 1912 West Point football team. Dwight D. Eisenhower is third from left. Louis A. Merillat is eighth from the left, in the A sweater. Omar Bradley is on the far right, to the left of Leland Hobbs

Eisenhower requested to serve in the Insular Government of the Philippine Islands, but was assigned to the 19th Infantry Regiment at Fort Sam Houston in San Antonio, Texas. While stationed there, Eisenhower served as the football coach for St. Louis College, now St. Mary's University. He also met and married Mamie Doud, the daughter of a meat-processing facility owner from Denver, Colorado. Eisenhower performed security duties along the Mexican Border during the Pancho Villa Expedition and received his first command assignment when he was chosen to lead the 19th Infantry's Company F.

World War I had broken out in Europe in 1914, and the U.S. joined the war on the side of the Entente Powers in April 1917. Like many 19th Infantry personnel, Eisenhower was promoted and assigned to the newly created 57th Infantry Regiment, where he served as the regimental supply officer. In September 1917, he was assigned to train reserve officers, first at Fort Oglethrope and then at Fort Leavenworth.

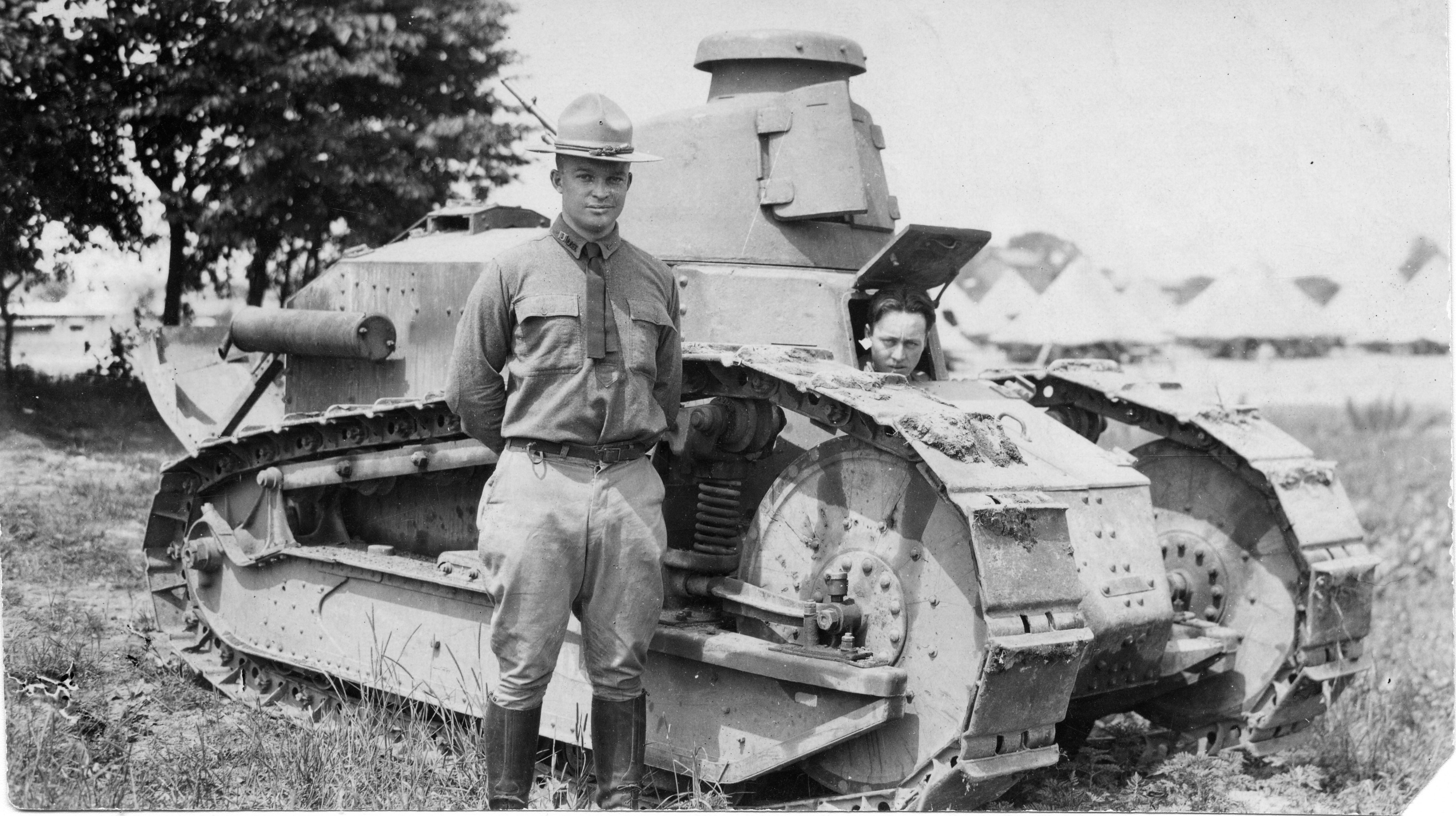
Eisenhower as Lieutenant Colonel in 1919

In February 1918, he was transferred to Camp Meade, Maryland, where he was assigned command of the 301st Heavy Tank Battalion. By the beginning of 1918, the United States Army did not have a single operational tank, but the battalion planned to use British-provided Mark VI tanks after arriving in Europe. The 301st was initially scheduled to be deployed to Europe in early 1918, but in March 1918 the Tank Corps was established as an independent branch of the army, and Eisenhower's unit was assigned for further training at Camp Colt. After months of rudimentary training, the first tank, a Renault FT, arrived in June 1918. In September, the "Spanish flu" epidemic hit the camp, ultimately killing 175 of the roughly 10,000 men under his command. In October, Eisenhower was promoted to the rank of lieutenant colonel, and two weeks later he received orders to deploy to Europe. Shortly before the deployment, the war ended with the signing of the Armistice of 11 November 1918. Though Eisenhower and his tank crews never saw combat, he displayed excellent organizational skills, as well as an ability to accurately assess junior officers' strengths and make optimal placements of personnel. Despite his success as an organizer and trainer, his World War II rivals often sought to denigrate Eisenhower for his lack of combat experience.

== Between wars ==
=== Tank warfare and transcontinental convoy, 1918–1921 ===
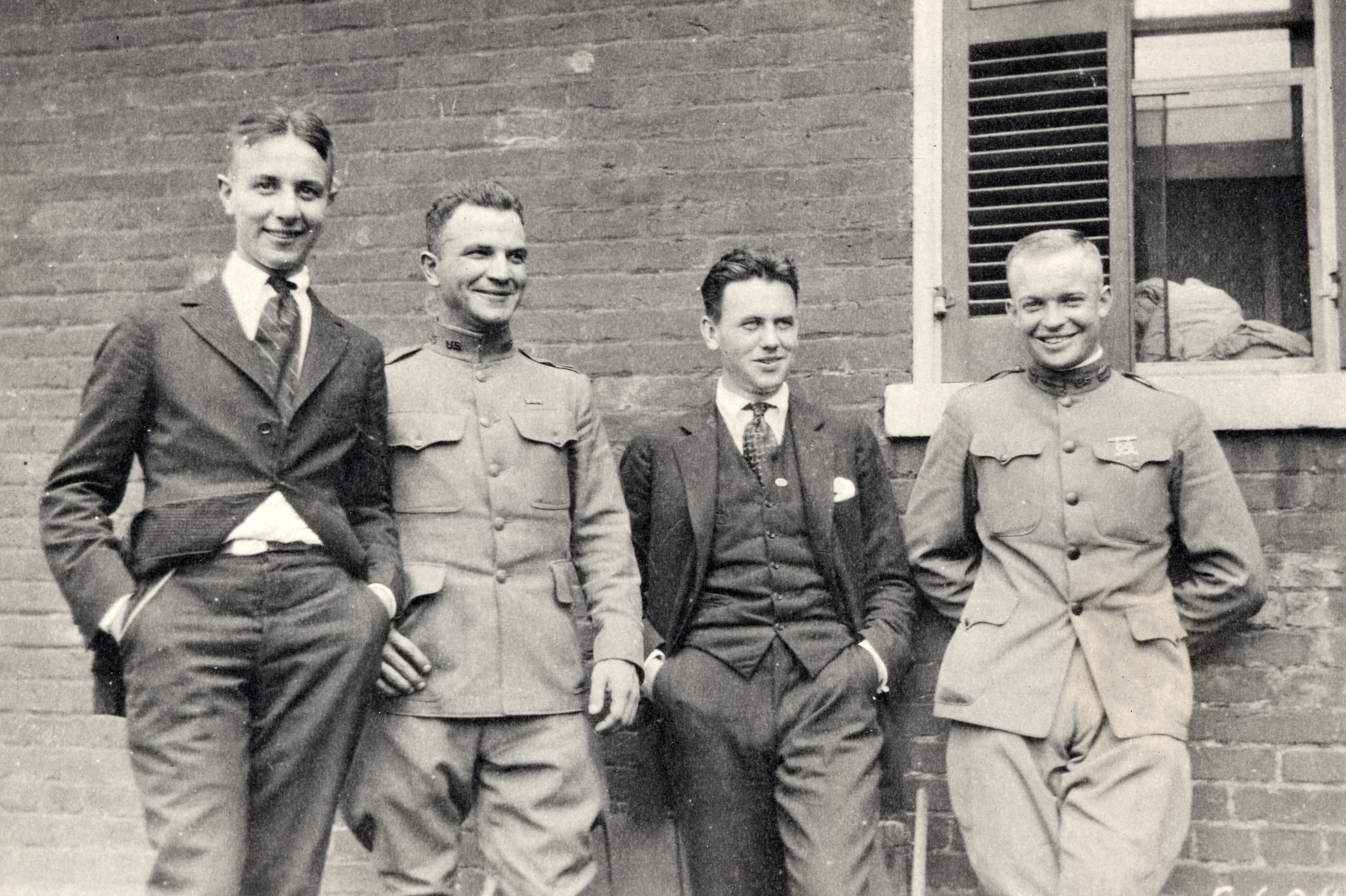
Eisenhower (far right) with three friends (William Stuhler, Major Brett, and Paul V. Robinson) in 1919, four years after graduating from West Point

With the end of World War I, the United States dramatically cut back military spending, and the number of active duty personnel in the army dropped from 2.4 million in late 1918 to about 150,000 in 1922. Eisenhower reverted to his regular rank (Note: During World War I, the United States had created a new organization, the National Army, which included many conscripts and volunteers in addition to officers from the pre-existing United States Army. After the war, the National Army was disbanded, and officers who had been temporarily promoted in the National Army reverted to their rank in the Regular Army.) of captain, but was almost immediately promoted to the rank of major, the rank he held for the next sixteen years. Along with the rest of the Tank Corps, Eisenhower was assigned to Fort George G. Meade in Maryland. In 1919, he served on the Transcontinental Motor Convoy, an army vehicle exercise that traveled from Washington, D.C. to San Francisco at a pace of 5 mph. The convoy was designed both as a training event and as a way to publicize the need for better roads, and spurred many states to increase funding for road-building. Eisenhower's experience in the convoy would later influence his decision to help create the Interstate Highway System in the 1950s.

He then returned to his duties at Camp Meade, serving as executive officer and then as commander of the 305th Tank Brigade, which fielded Mark VIII tanks. His new expertise in tank warfare was strengthened by a close collaboration with George S. Patton, Sereno E. Brett, and other senior tank leaders; while Eisenhower commanded the 305th Tank Brigade, Patton commanded the 304th, which fielded the lighter Renault FT tank and was also based at Camp Meade. Their leading-edge ideas of speed-oriented offensive tank warfare were strongly discouraged by superiors, who considered the new approach too radical and preferred to continue using tanks in a strictly supportive role for the infantry. After being threatened with a court-martial by General Charles S. Farnsworth, the chief of infantry, Eisenhower refrained from publishing theories that challenged existing tank doctrine. Although Secretary of War Newton D. Baker and Chief of Staff Peyton C. March both advocated for the continuation of the Tank Corps as an independent branch of the army, the National Defense Act of 1920 folded the Tank Corps into the infantry. In 1921 Army Inspector General Eli Helmick found that Eisenhower had improperly received $250.76 in housing allowance. Eisenhower claimed he had received the money with no intent to deceive, and he repaid it in full after Helmick made his finding. Helmick still pressed for a court-martial, and only the intervention of General Fox Conner, who told Pershing he wanted Eisenhower to serve as his executive officer in the Panama Canal Zone, saved Eisenhower from possible imprisonment and dismissal from the service. Though Conner saved Eisenhower's career, Eisenhower still received a written reprimand that became part of his military record.

=== Service under Conner and Pershing, 1922–1929 ===
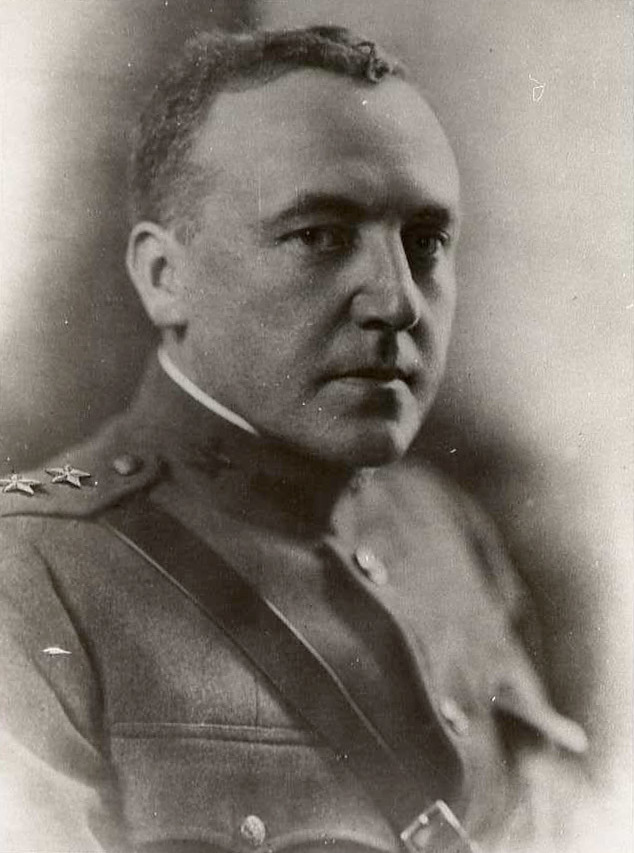
General Fox Conner served as a mentor to Eisenhower

Between 1922 and 1939, Eisenhower served under a succession of talented generals – Fox Conner, John J. Pershing, and Douglas MacArthur. Accompanied by Mamie, he served as General Conner's executive officer in Panama from 1922 to 1924. Under Conner's tutelage, he studied military history and theory, including the campaigns of Napoleon, the American Civil War, and Carl von Clausewitz's On War. Conner also shared his experiences working with the French and British during World War I, emphasizing the importance of the "art of persuasion" when dealing with allies. Eisenhower later cited Conner's enormous influence on his military thinking, saying in 1962 that "Fox Conner was the ablest man I ever knew." Conner's comment on Eisenhower was, "[He] is one of the most capable, efficient and loyal officers I have ever met." Conner would play a critical role in Eisenhower's career, often helping him gain choice assignments.

On Conner's recommendation, and ranked in the top 10% of active-duty majors, in 1925–26 Eisenhower attended the Command and General Staff College (CGS) at Fort Leavenworth. He was worried that he would be disadvantaged by not having attended Infantry School like most of his classmates, but Conner assured him that his study in Panama was good preparation; Eisenhower graduated first in his CGS class of 245 officers. The army considered making him the head of the Reserve Officers' Training Corps program at a major university (Eisenhower would also have served as its football coach, doubling his pay) or a CGS faculty member, but assigned him as executive officer of the 24th Infantry Regiment at Fort Benning, Georgia until 1927. Eisenhower disliked serving with the Buffalo Soldiers regiment; many white officers viewed serving in an all-black unit as punishment for poor performance.

With Conner's help, Eisenhower was assigned to work under General Pershing on the American Battle Monuments Commission, which established monuments and cemeteries in Western Europe to honor fallen American soldiers. While serving on the commission, he produced A Guide to the American Battlefields in Europe, a 282-page work which consisted largely of a history of the American Expeditionary Forces' battles on the Western Front during World War I. He next attended the Army War College, where he graduated first in his class in 1928. After graduating from the Army War College, he was reassigned to the American Battle Monuments Commission, arriving in Paris in August 1928. While in Europe, he learned to read (but not speak) French, continued his study of World War I battles, and followed the contemporary politics of the French Third Republic. In 1929, while helping General Pershing compile his memoirs, Eisenhower met Colonel George C. Marshall for the first time.

=== Service under Moseley and MacArthur, 1929–1939 ===
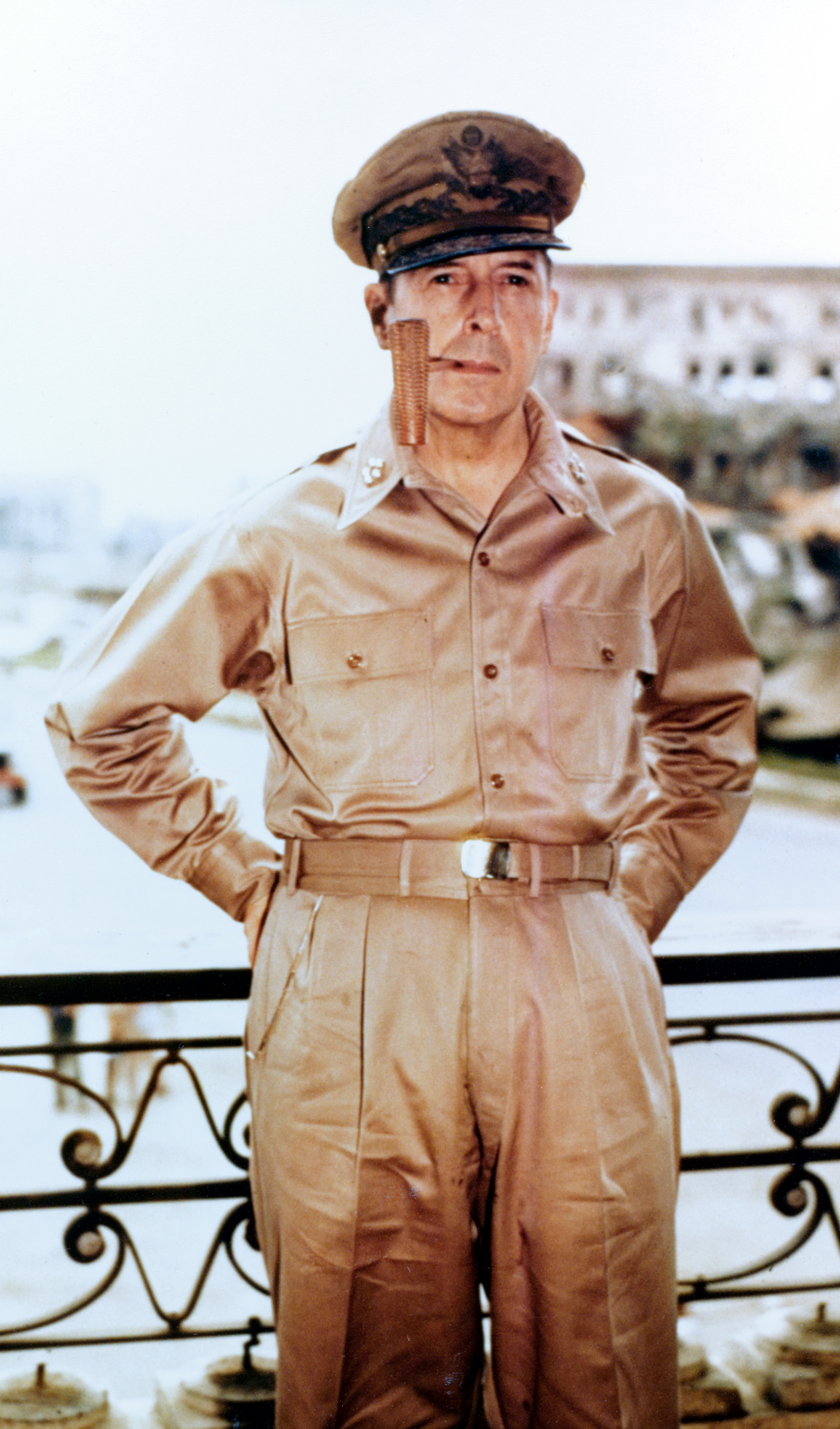
Eisenhower served under General Douglas MacArthur for much of the 1930s

In 1929, Eisenhower became the executive officer to General George Van Horn Moseley, who served on the staff of Assistant Secretary of War Frederick Huff Payne. In this role, Eisenhower helped make national defense policy and studied wartime industrial mobilization and the relationship between government and industry. He formulated a 180-page mobilization plan, known as M-Day Plan, which was never utilized but which impressed his superiors. After Douglas MacArthur became army chief of staff, he assigned Moseley as Deputy Chief of Staff. Eisenhower officially remained on Moseley's staff, but he also worked as MacArthur's unofficial military secretary and served on the War Policies Commission, which studied the possibility of a constitutional amendment designed to clarify Congress's war-time powers. In 1932, he participated in MacArthur's violent clearing of the Bonus March encampment in Washington, D.C. Eisenhower wrote and submitted MacArthur's official report regarding the incident, but he was privately critical of MacArthur's heavy-handed methods. President Herbert Hoover was strongly criticized in the press for his administration's handling of Bonus March, even from papers that were normally sympathetic to his administration. In 1933, Eisenhower graduated from the Army Industrial College, which is now known as the Dwight D. Eisenhower School for National Security and Resource Strategy.

In 1935, he accompanied MacArthur to the Philippines, where he was charged with developing the nascent Philippine Army. Congress had passed the Tydings–McDuffie Act the previous year, setting the Philippines on the path to independence in 1946, and both MacArthur and Eisenhower remained on active duty in the U.S. army while serving as military advisers to the Philippine government. (Note: MacArthur also accepted appointment as a field marshal in the Philippine army, a decision that Eisenhower disagreed with. MacArthur would later continue to serve in the Philippine Army after refusing reassignment and retiring from the U.S. Army in December 1937. Eisenhower continued to serve as MacArthur's chief of staff, but also became the ranking U.S. officer in the Philippines until he was reassigned in December 1939.) Eisenhower declined the rank of brigadier general in the Philippine army, but was promoted to lieutenant colonel in the U.S. army in 1936. Eisenhower viewed the Philippine defense budget as inadequate, and he struggled to provide the army with modern weapons and sufficient training. He had strong philosophical disagreements with MacArthur regarding the role of the Philippine Army and the leadership qualities that an American army officer should exhibit and develop in his subordinates. The resulting antipathy between Eisenhower and MacArthur lasted the rest of their lives, though Eisenhower later emphasized that too much had been made of his disagreements with MacArthur. In his final official evaluation of Eisenhower, written during 1937, MacArthur wrote that Eisenhower was a "brilliant officer" who "in time of war ... should be promoted to General rank immediately." Historians have concluded that this assignment provided valuable preparation for handling the challenging personalities of Winston Churchill, George S. Patton, George C. Marshall, and Bernard Montgomery during World War II.

=== Eve of World War II, 1939–1941 ===
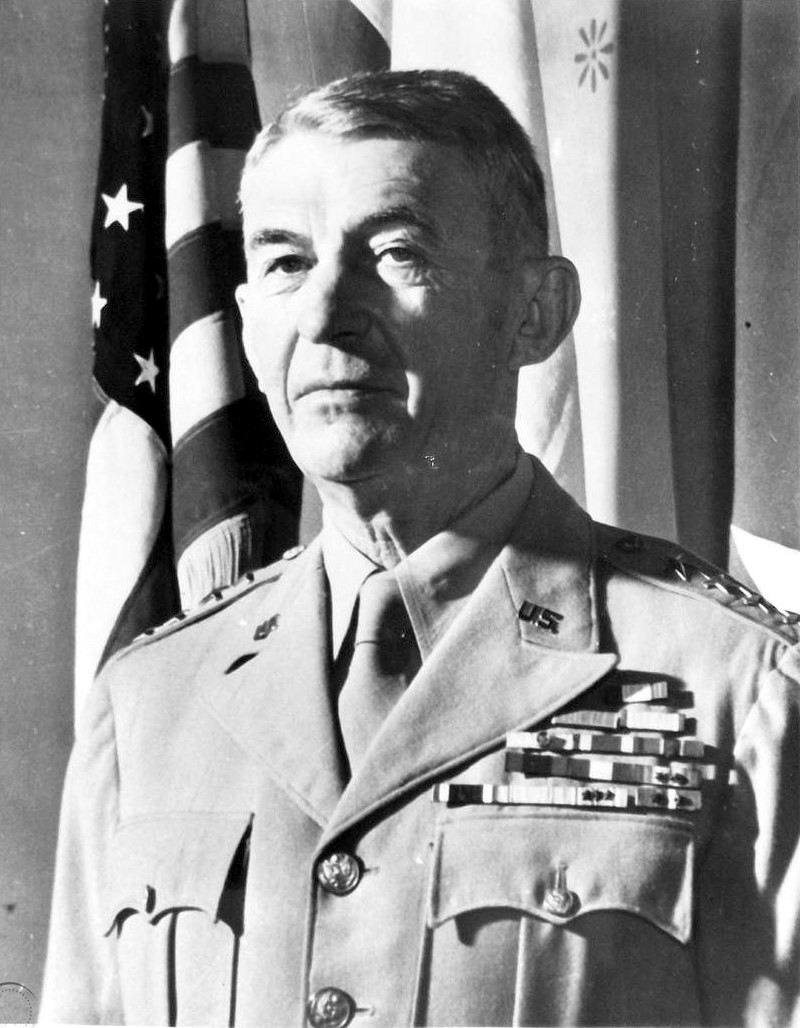
Eisenhower served as chief of staff to Lieutenant General Walter Krueger during the Louisiana Maneuvers of 1941

Nazi Germany invaded Poland in September 1939. By this time, Eisenhower had impressed his fellow officers with his administrative skills, but he had never held an active command above a brigade and few considered him a potential commander of major operations. Eisenhower returned to the United States in December 1939 and was assigned as commanding officer (CO) of 1st Battalion, 15th Infantry Regiment at Fort Lewis. Eisenhower enjoyed his role as a CO, writing later that his command of a battalion during maneuvers "fortified my conviction that I belonged with the troops; with them I was always happy." Eisenhower's time as commander of the battalion was brief, because he was assigned as the regiment's executive officer (XO). In June 1940, Congress promoted every officer in the army by one rank; Eisenhower officially became a colonel in March 1941. He hoped for a regimental command, but was disappointed when Major General Charles F. Thompson, commander of the 3rd Infantry Division, which was the 15th Infantry's higher headquarters, selected him to serve as the division's chief of staff. Eisenhower loyally acceded, and his success in the position was later viewed as one factor that caused the Army's senior leaders to identify Eisenhower as a candidate for positions of more rank and responsibility. (Note: Thompson retired as a major general and lived in Washington, DC. His wife and he became friendly with the Eisenhowers, and the couples often played contract bridge together. Thompson died in 1954, and the Eisenhowers attended his funeral.) Brigadier General Leonard T. Gerow, an old and close friend, asked Eisenhower to serve on his staff in the War Plans Division, but Eisenhower was determined to hold a command, and his ambivalent reply convinced Gerow to withdraw the request.

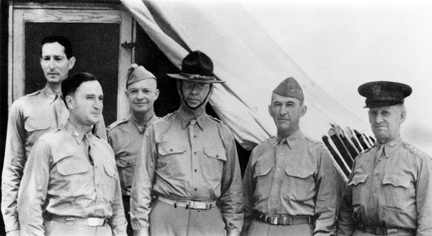
Senior officers during the Louisiana Maneuvers, September 1941. Colonel Eisenhower, chief of staff of the Third Army, is standing third from the left

The army expanded from about 200,000 men in late 1939 to 1.4 million men in mid-1941. In March 1941, Eisenhower was assigned as chief of staff of the newly activated IX Corps under Major General Kenyon A. Joyce. In June 1941, he was appointed chief of staff to Lieutenant General Walter Krueger, commander of the Third Army at Fort Sam Houston. In mid-1941, the U.S. Army conducted the Louisiana Maneuvers, the largest military exercise that the army had ever conducted on U.S. soil. The Second Army and the Third Army, which collectively had nearly 500,000 troops, conducted two mock battles that both ended in victory for the Third Army. The Third Army's success in the maneuvers impressed Eisenhower's superiors, and he was promoted to temporary brigadier general on 3 October. Fellow officers predicted that he would become a major general in six months.

== World War II ==
=== War Plans Division, 1941–1942 ===
After the Japanese attack on Pearl Harbor in December 1941, the United States entered World War II. Almost immediately after the attack on Pearl Harbor, General Marshall assigned Eisenhower as Deputy Chief of the War Plans Division in Washington. Marshall assigned him to coordinate the defense of the Philippines, and Eisenhower personally dispatched General Patrick J. Hurley to Australia with $10 million to provide supplies to MacArthur. Biographer Jean Edward Smith writes that Marshall and Eisenhower developed a "father-son relationship"; it was widely assumed that Marshall would eventually lead major operations in Europe, and he initially sought to prepare Eisenhower to serve as his chief of staff during those operations. In February 1942, Eisenhower succeeded General Gerow as chief of the War Plans Division (later known as the Operations Division), and he was promoted to major general the following month, Time describing him as "one of the finest staff officers in the army".

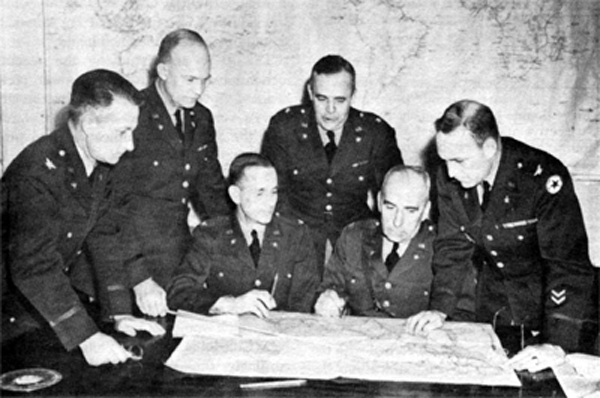
Officers of the War Plans Division, March 1942. Brigadier General Eisenhower is standing second from the left, next to Colonel St. Clair Streett

Tasked with helping develop the army's grand strategy in the war, Eisenhower formulated a plan that centered on the build-up of U.S. forces in Britain, followed by an invasion of Nazi-occupied Western Europe in April 1943. Eisenhower and Marshall both shared the conclusion of President Franklin D. Roosevelt and British Prime Minister Winston Churchill that the United States should pursue a Europe first strategy against the Axis Powers. Though American and British leaders agreed to Eisenhower's proposed April 1943 invasion of Western Europe, competing priorities in other theaters of the war would repeatedly delay the invasion.

=== Operations in the Mediterranean, 1942–1943 ===
==== Appointment in Europe ====
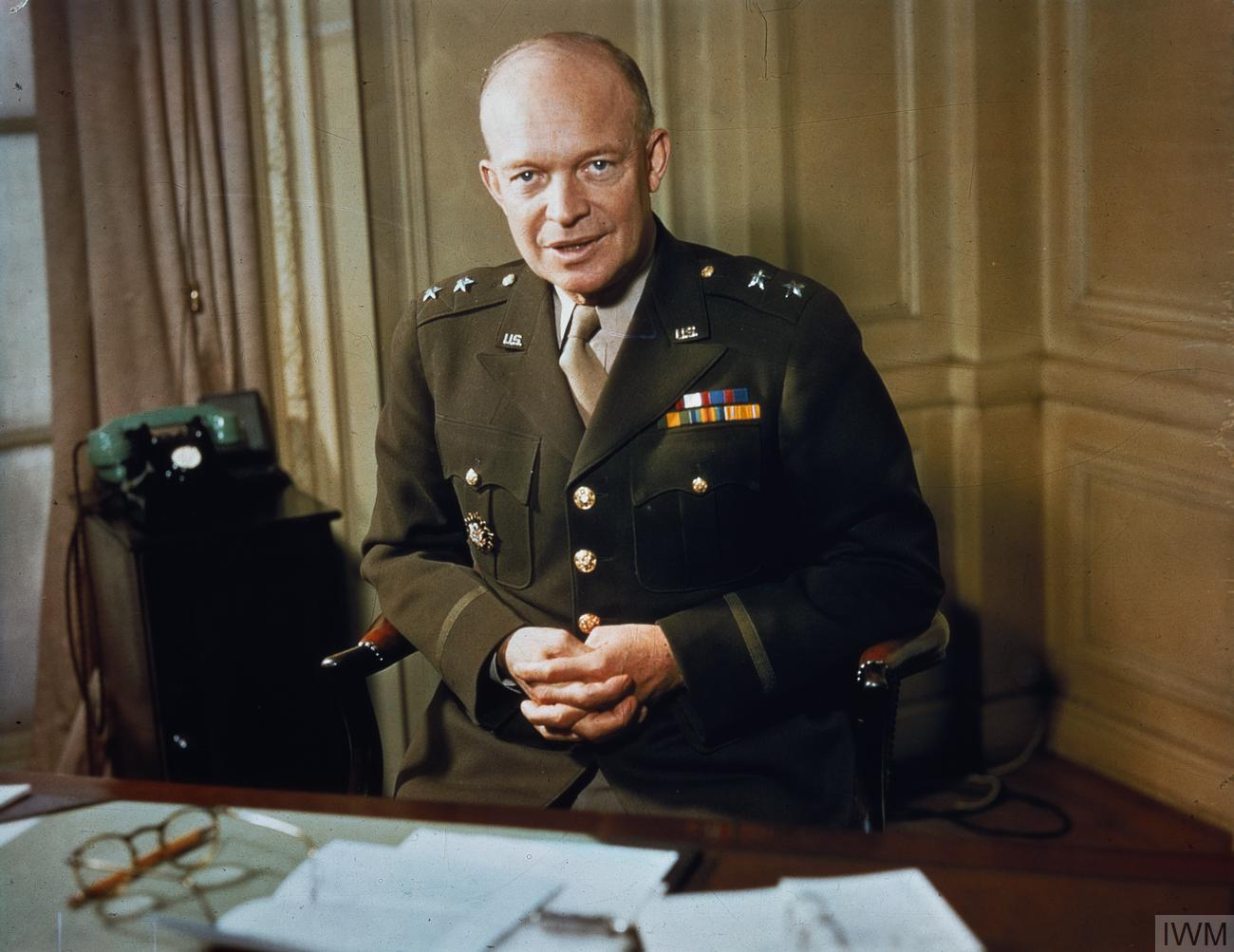
Eisenhower in 1942

While assessing Operation Bolero, the build-up of Allied soldiers in Britain, Marshall and Eisenhower both came to the conclusion that General James E. Chaney was unsuited to the task of leading American forces in Britain. Eisenhower recommended the appointment of a single American commander in the European Theater of Operations (ETO), suggesting General Joseph T. McNarney for the role. With the blessing of Stimson, Roosevelt, and Churchill, Marshall instead selected Eisenhower for the position, and Eisenhower was officially appointed as the commander of the ETO in June 1942; he was promoted to lieutenant general shortly thereafter.

Eisenhower retained Admiral Harold Rainsford Stark as the commander of U.S. naval forces in Europe, and selected General Mark W. Clark and General Carl Spaatz as the respective commanders of U.S. ground troops and air forces in the theater. General John C. H. Lee became the commander of the theater's logistical organization, and General Walter Bedell Smith became Eisenhower's chief of staff. His command involved important military and administrative duties, but one of his chief challenges was coordinating a multinational military and political alliance among combatants with contrasting military traditions and doctrines, as well a level of distrust. He also frequently met with the press and emerged as a public symbol of the Allied war effort.

==== Operation Torch ====
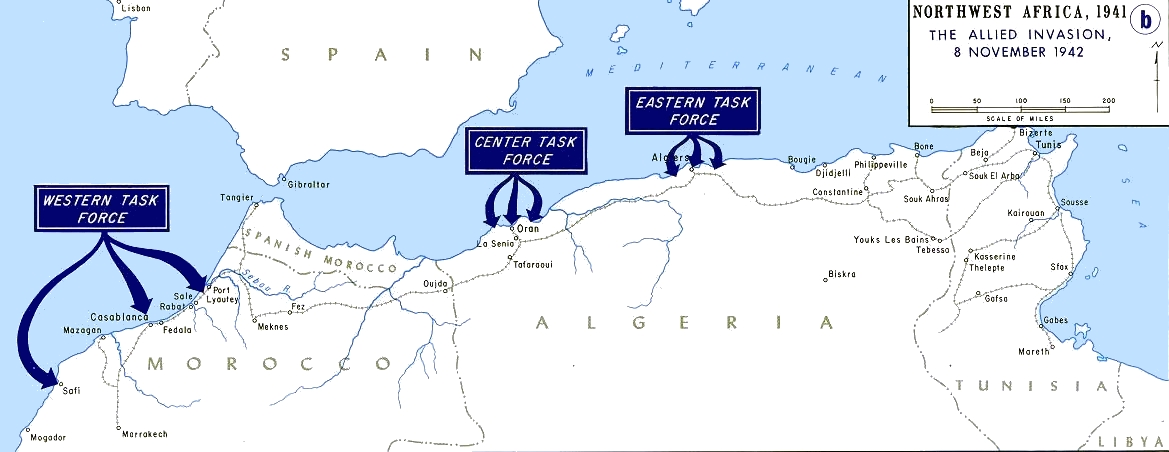
Location of the Operation Torch landings in North Africa, November 1942

Overcoming objections from Eisenhower and Marshall, Prime Minister Churchill convinced Roosevelt that the Allies should delay an invasion of Western Europe and instead launch Operation Torch, an invasion in North Africa. The U.S. and Britain had previously agreed to establish a Combined Chiefs of Staff to serve as a unified command structure, and to appoint one individual as the commander of all Allied forces in each theater of war. (Note: Biographer Jean Edward Smith notes that this unified command structure represented "an unprecedented achievement in coalition warfare.".) Eisenhower became the commander of all Allied forces operating in the Mediterranean Theater of Operations, making him the direct superior of both American and British officers.

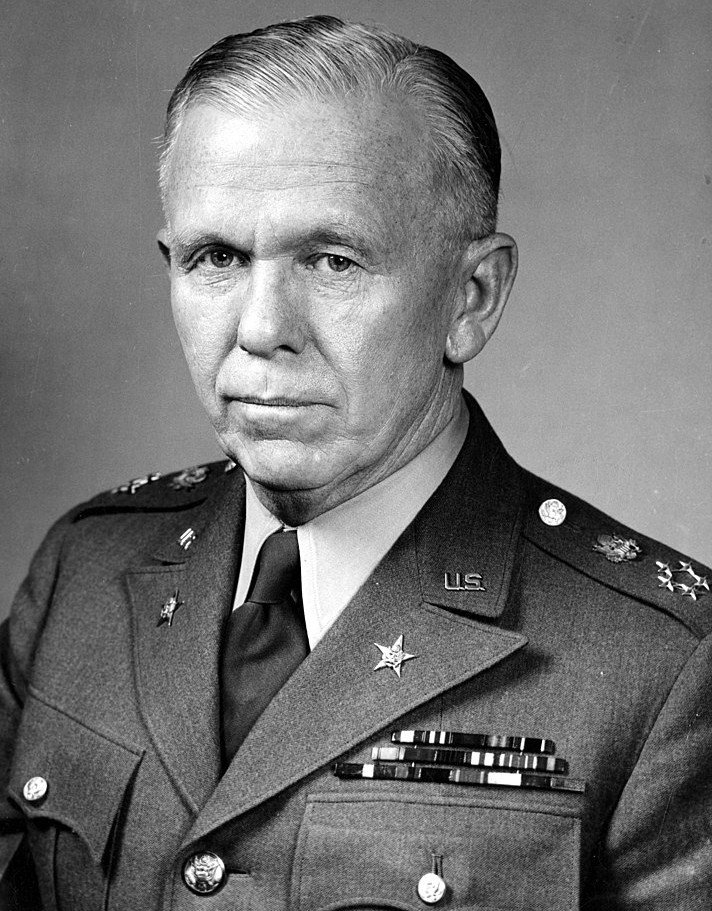
Chief of Staff George C. Marshall, Eisenhower's direct superior for most of World War II

The three-pronged Allied landing in North Africa, which biographer Jean Edward Smith describes as the "greatest amphibious operation that had ever been attempted" at that point in history, would take place on the Atlantic coast of French Morocco and on the Mediterranean coast of Algeria. At the time, both Algeria and French Morocco were controlled by Vichy France, an officially neutral power that had been established in southern France following the French surrender to Germany in 1940. Vichy France had a complex relationship with the Allied Powers; it collaborated with Nazi Germany, but was recognized by the United States as the official government of France. Hoping to encourage French forces in Africa to support the Allied campaign, Eisenhower and diplomat Robert Daniel Murphy attempted to recruit General Henri Giraud, who lived in the Vichy-controlled part of France but was not part of its high command.

Eisenhower and Murphy were unable to gain Giraud's full support by the time of the landings, and French forces initially resisted the Allied landing. General Alphonse Juin, the commander of Vichy forces in North Africa, quickly agreed to an armistice in Algiers, but fighting continued at the other two landing spots. After it became clear that French forces in Africa would not accept Giraud as their commander, Murphy and General Clark negotiated an agreement with Admiral François Darlan, the commander-in-chief of Vichy armed forces, that granted the Allied Powers military access to French North Africa but confirmed French sovereignty over the region.

Though the agreement with Darlan provided for French cooperation in North Africa, Eisenhower was strongly criticized in the American and British press for his willingness to work with a Vichy official. Darlan was assassinated in December 1942 by Frenchman Fernand Bonnier de La Chapelle, (Note: Bonnier de la Chapelle was executed by French authorities less than 36 hours after the assassination. Biographer Jean Edward Smith writes that Bonnier de la Chapelle's motivation for killing Darlan remains unclear.) and Eisenhower appointed Giraud as the leader of French forces in Africa. Giraud would later become co-president of the French Committee of National Liberation (FCNL) alongside Free France leader Charles de Gaulle, but de Gaulle emerged as the clear leader of the organization, and the French war effort, by the end of 1943. Eisenhower, who had not actively supported either Giraud or de Gaulle after the initial campaign in French Africa, established a strong working relationship with de Gaulle for the remainder of the war.

==== Tunisian campaign ====
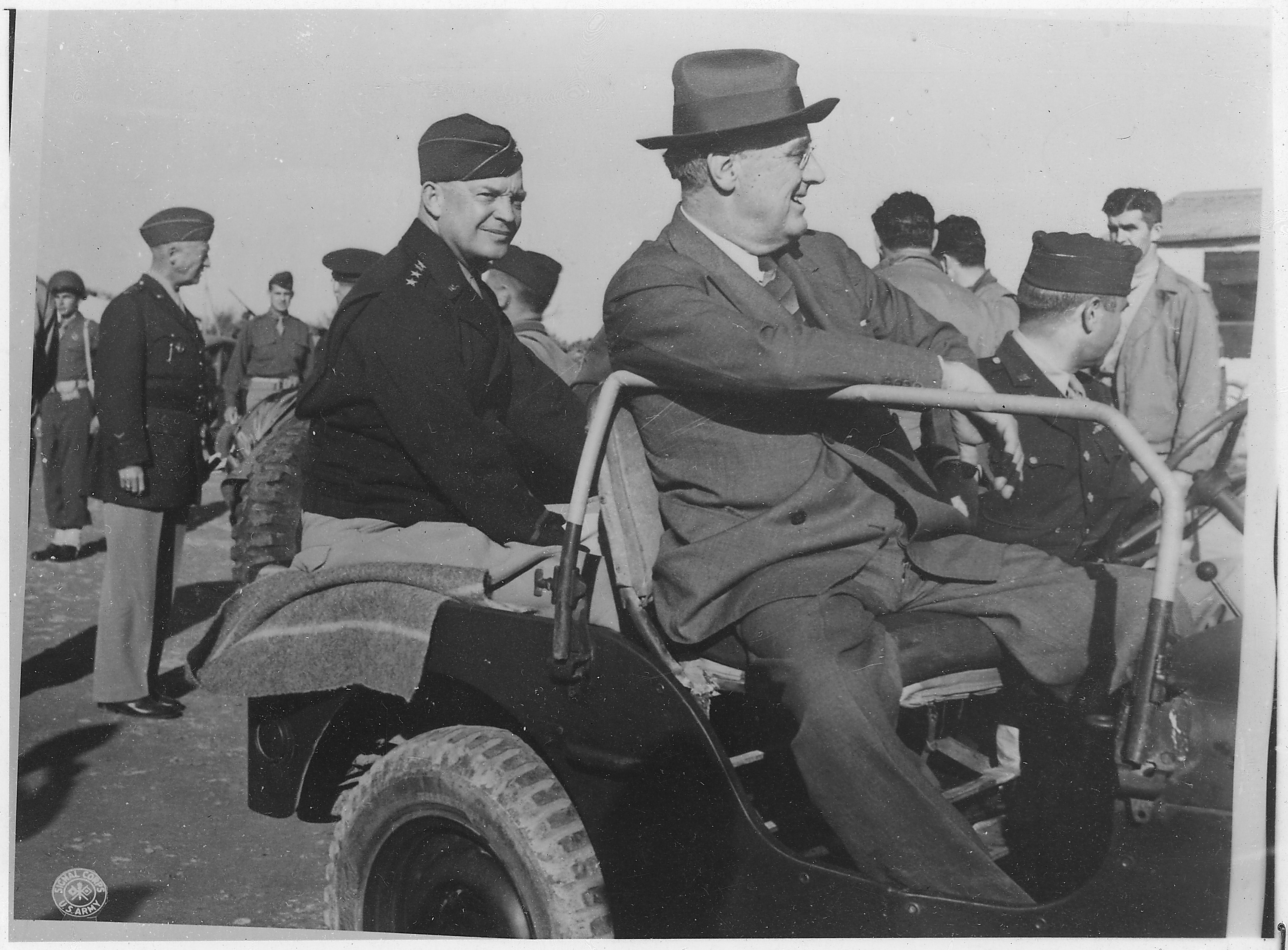
Eisenhower and President Franklin D. Roosevelt in Sicily, 1943

Following the success of Operation Torch, the Allies launched an invasion of Tunisia, which the Germans had taken control of during Operation Torch. (Note: In response to Operation Torch, Nazi Germany had also occupied southern France, ending the period of Vichy quasi-independence.) Bolstered by superior tanks and air power, as well as favorable weather, the German forces established a strong defense of the city of Tunis, leading to a stalemate in the campaign. The slow progress in Tunisia displeased many leading American and British officials, and General Harold Alexander, the head of the British Near East Command, was appointed as Eisenhower's deputy commander. At the same time, Eisenhower was promoted to the rank of general, making him the twelfth four-star general in U.S. history. In February 1943, German forces launched a successful attack on General Lloyd Fredendall's II Corps at the Battle of Kasserine Pass. The II Corps collapsed and Eisenhower relieved Fredendall of command, but Allied forces prevented a German breakthrough. After the battle, the Allies continually built up their forces and slowly ground down German defenses. 250,000 Axis soldiers surrendered in May 1943, bringing an end to the North African Campaign.

==== Italian campaign ====
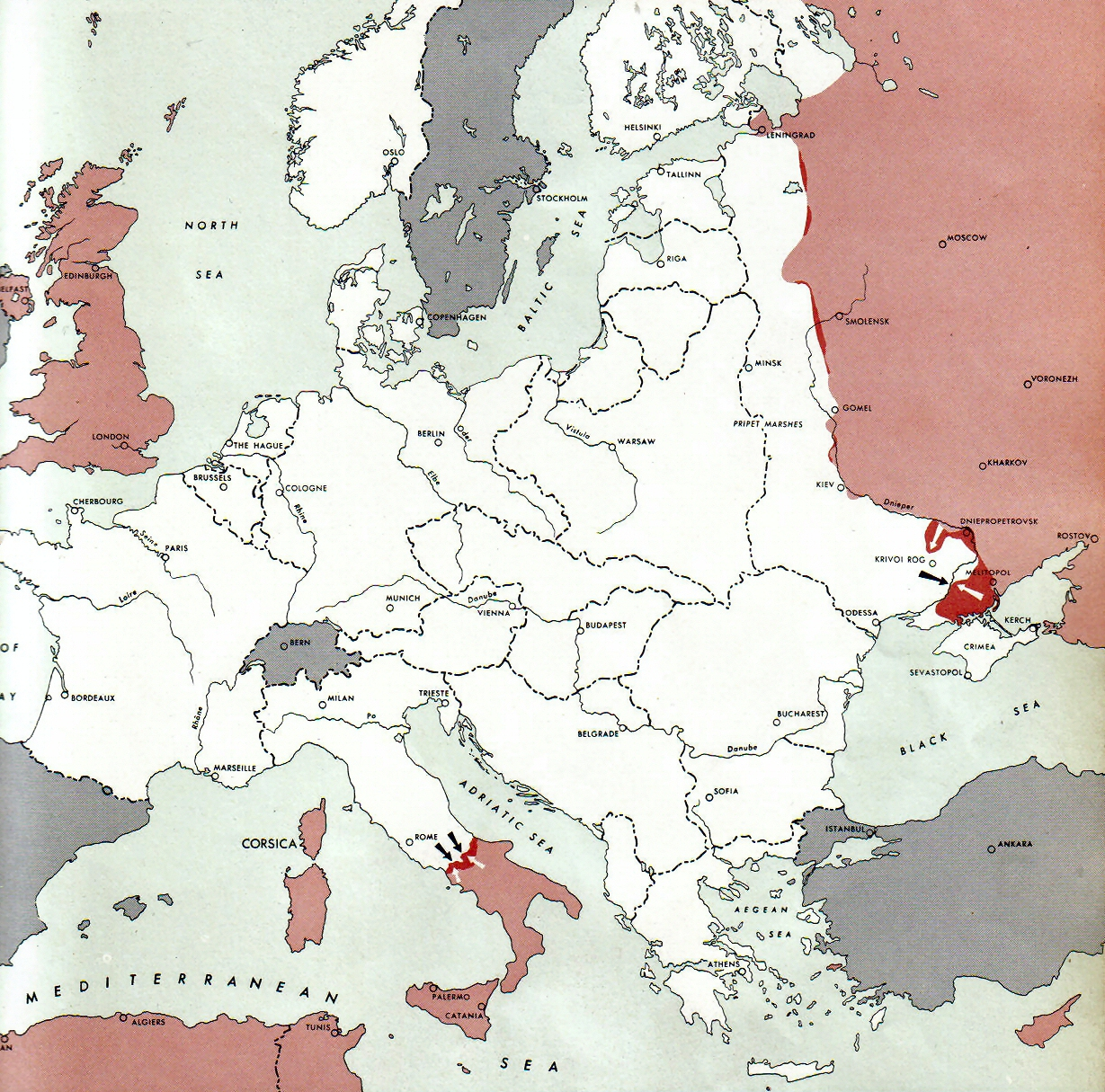
By November 1943, the Allies (red) had taken control of North Africa and much of Southern Italy.

As the length of the campaign in Tunisia had made a cross-channel invasion of France impracticable in 1943, Roosevelt and Churchill agreed that the next Allied target would be Italy. The July 1943 invasion of Sicily was overseen by Eisenhower and Alexander, with General Sir Bernard Montgomery and Lieutenant General George S. Patton each leading one of two simultaneous landings. Allied forces staged a successful landing, but they failed to prevent the retreat of a large portion of the German forces to mainland Italy. Shortly after the end of the campaign, Eisenhower severely reprimanded Patton after Patton slapped two subordinates. Eisenhower refused to dismiss Patton in the midst of a public furor, though the slapping incidents may have played a role in his decision to recommend Lieutenant General Omar Bradley as the leader of preparations for the upcoming invasion of Western Europe.

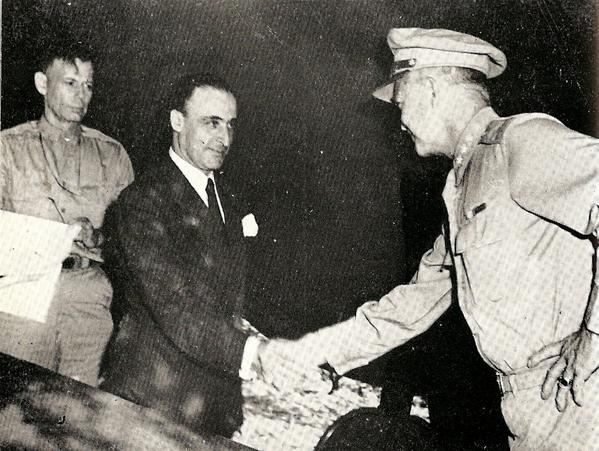
General Giuseppe Castellano (in civilian clothes) shakes hands with General Dwight D. Eisenhower after the signing of the armistice between Italy and Allied armed forces in Cassibile on 8 September 1943. Major General Walter Bedell Smith looks on

General Dwight D. Eisenhower, supreme commander of thd Allied forces, confers with Lieutenant General Mark W. Clark, conmander of the U.S. Fifth Army, in Italy, October 1943.

During the campaign in Sicily, King Victor Emmanuel III of Italy arrested Prime Minister Benito Mussolini and replaced him with Pietro Badoglio, who secretly negotiated a surrender with the Allies. Germany responded by shifting several divisions to Italy, occupying Rome, and establishing a puppet state, the Italian Social Republic. The Allied invasion of mainland Italy began in September 1943. In the aftermath of Italy's surrender, the Allies faced unexpectedly strong resistance from German forces under Field Marshal Albert Kesselring, who nearly defeated Operation Avalanche, the Allied landing near the port of Salerno. With 24 German divisions defending the country's rugged terrain, Italy quickly became a secondary theater in the war.

=== Operations in Western Europe, 1944–1945 ===
==== Operation Overlord ====
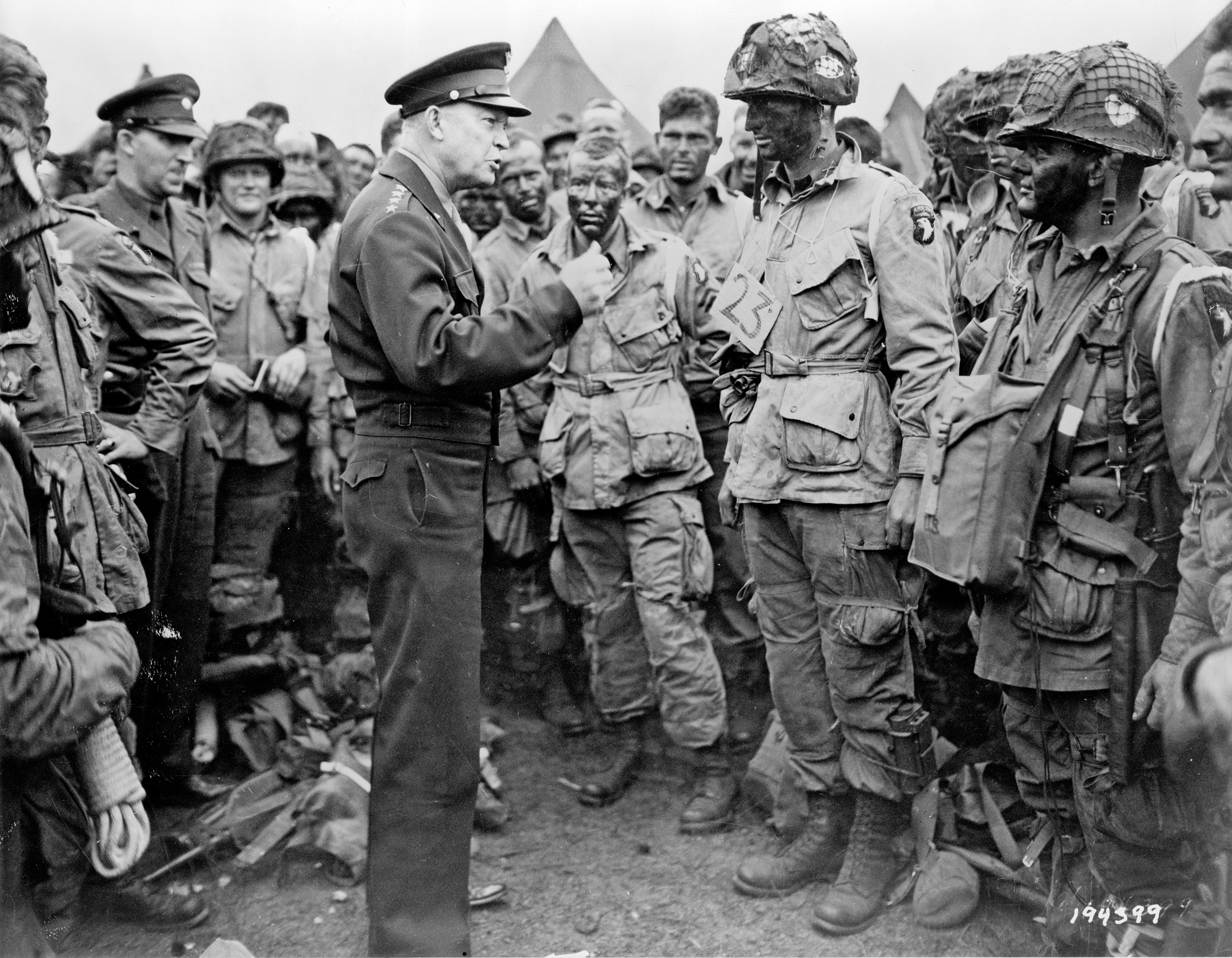
Eisenhower speaking with men of the 502nd Parachute Infantry Regiment, part of the 101st Airborne Division, on 5 June 1944, the day before the D-Day invasion

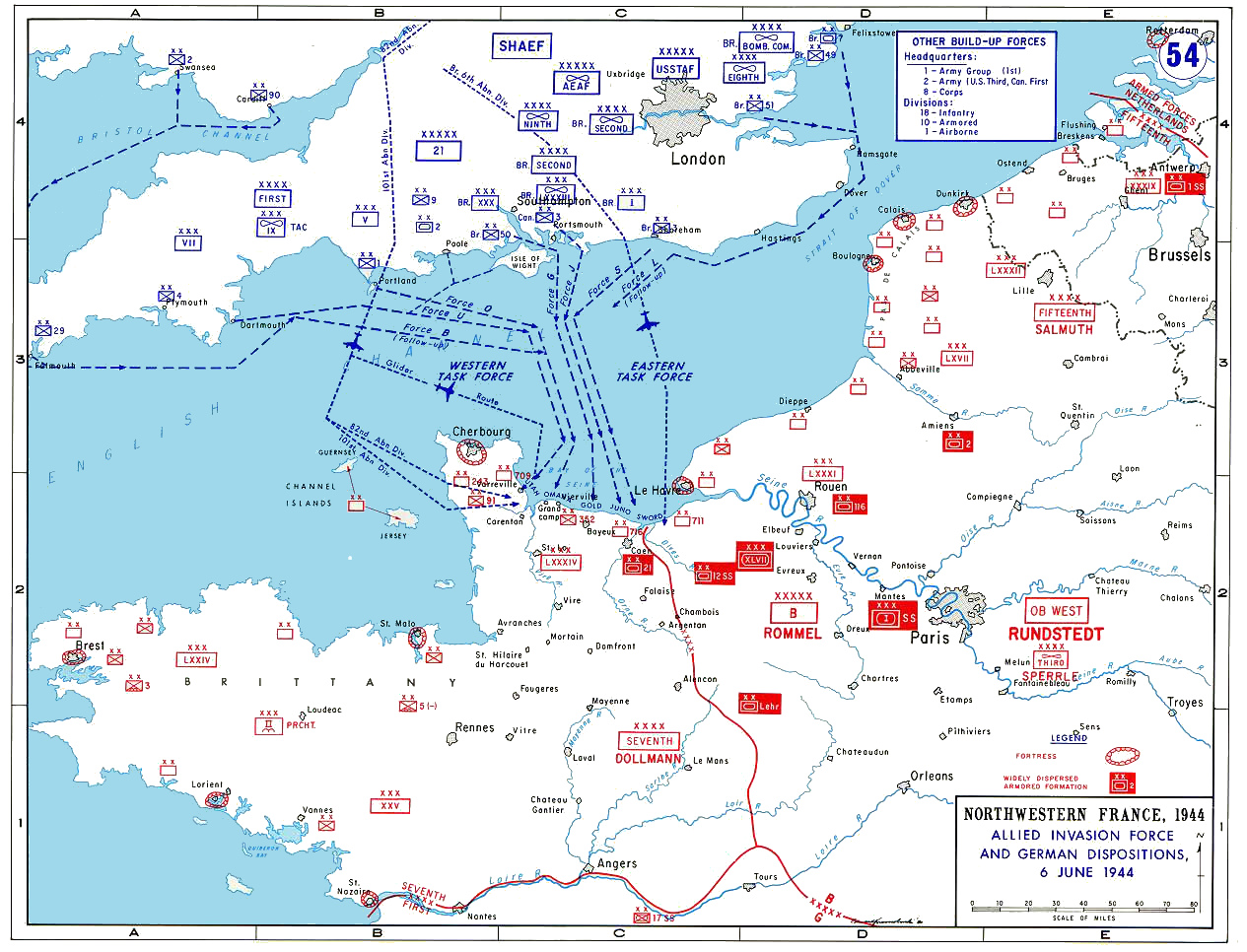
Map of the Normandy landings

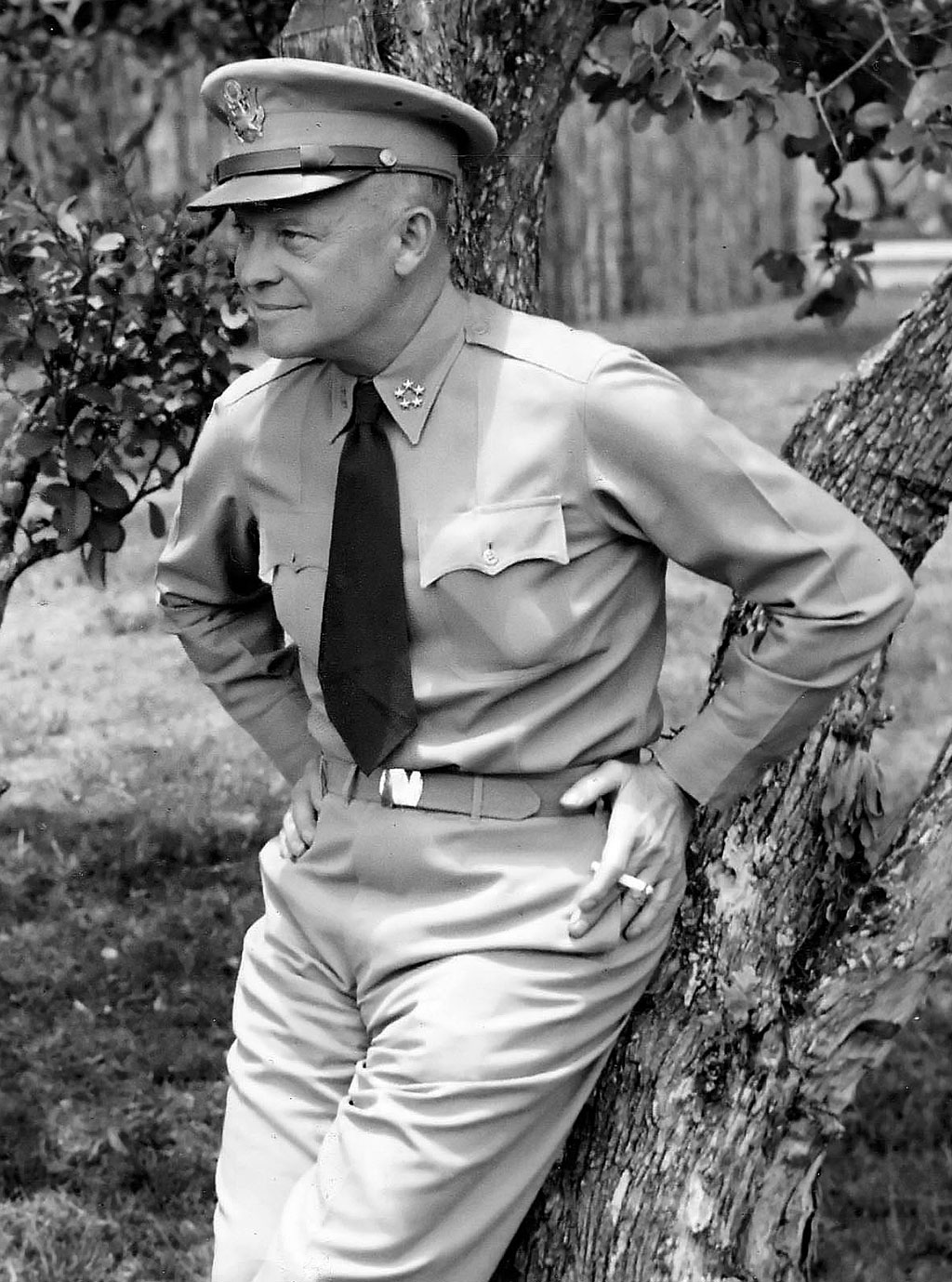
Eisenhower as General of the Army, 1945

In December 1943, President Roosevelt decided that Eisenhower—not Marshall—would lead Operation Overlord, the Allied invasion of Western Europe. Roosevelt believed that Eisenhower's experience leading multinational and amphibious operations made him well qualified for the position, and he was unwilling to lose Marshall as chief of staff. Eisenhower retained Smith as his chief of staff, chose Air Chief Marshal Tedder as his deputy, and made Admiral Bertram Ramsay and General John C. H. Lee the respective heads of naval operations and logistics in the theater. At the insistence of Churchill and the Combined Chiefs of Staff, he selected General Montgomery as commander of ground forces and Air Chief Marshal Trafford Leigh-Mallory as the commander of air forces in the theater. Prioritizing individuals with recent battle experience, he selected Bradley as the senior American field commander and General Spaatz as the head of the American strategic air force. Despite the earlier slapping incidents, Patton was chosen to command the Third Army.

Eisenhower, as well as the officers and troops under him, had learned valuable lessons in their previous operations, preparing them for the most difficult campaign against the Germans—a beach landing assault in northern France. The starting point for the operation had been developed by a planning group led by General Frederick E. Morgan; the plan called for a landing in Normandy rather than at Pas-de-Calais, which was closer to Britain but was more heavily defended. Eisenhower and Montgomery jointly agreed to alter the plan in several ways, placing a greater emphasis on air superiority, increasing the number of soldiers committed to the operation, and establishing separate American and British landing zones across a wider area than had been originally envisioned. Eisenhower also helped secure de Gaulle's participation in the landing, partly by avoiding a diplomatic incident stemming from the arrest of several former Vichy officials who had assisted the Allies. Eisenhower believed that de Gaulle's cooperation was critical, not only for military operations but also for providing a government in France.

Drawing on the experience of Operation Avalanche, Eisenhower noted that it was "vital that the entire sum of our assault power, including the two Strategic Air Forces, be available for use during the critical stages of the attack." The final landing plan, largely devised by Montgomery, called for nine divisions to land at five zones. Three divisions of airborne infantry would land behind the enemy lines in order to seize vital roads and bridges. Originally scheduled for May 1944, Operation Overlord was pushed back a month, largely due to landing craft shortages. For the same reason, Operation Dragoon, the Allied landing in Southern France, would take place in August 1944 rather than contemporaneously with Overlord, as had originally been planned. Eisenhower insisted that the British give him exclusive command over all strategic air forces to facilitate the landing, to the point of threatening to resign unless Churchill relented, which he did.

High winds delayed Operation Overlord by a day, but Eisenhower chose to take advantage of a break in the weather and ordered the Normandy landings to take place on 6 June 1944. The timing and location of the landings surprised the Germans, and they failed to reinforce the beachheads in a timely manner. Allied forces quickly secured four of the five landing zones, though the Germans put up a strong defense of Omaha Beach. The Allies consolidated control of the landing zones and launched the next phase of the operation, capturing the port of Cherbourg by the end of June. By the end of July, over 1.5 million Allied soldiers and over 300,000 vehicles had landed in Normandy. The Allies repulsed a German counter-attack at the Battle of the Falaise Pocket, bringing a close to the fighting in Normandy. Meanwhile, the Operation Dragoon landings were successful, as the Allies captured Marseille and began moving north. On the Eastern Front, the Soviet Union launched a major offensive known as Operation Bagration, preventing Germany from sending reinforcements west.

==== Liberation of France and invasion of Germany ====
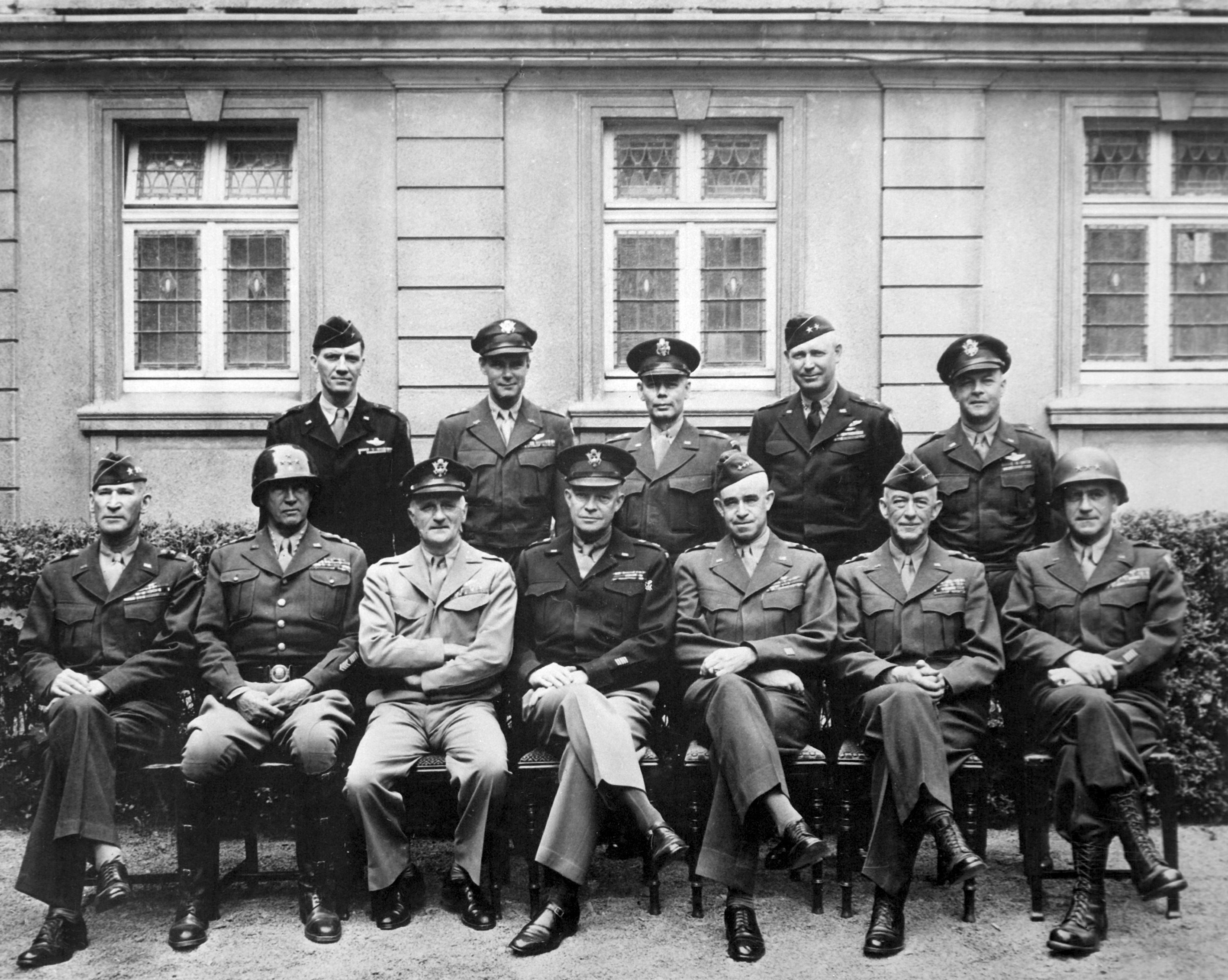
From left, front row includes army officers Simpson, Patton, Spaatz, Eisenhower, Bradley, Hodges and Gerow in 1945

Once the coastal assault had succeeded, Eisenhower insisted on retaining personal control over the land battle strategy, and was immersed in the command and supply of multiple assaults. Encouraged by de Gaulle and the German commander Dietrich von Choltitz, Eisenhower ordered the liberation of Paris in late August. Von Cholitz surrendered the city on 25 August, and de Gaulle triumphantly entered the city the following day. With German resistance collapsing sooner than had been expected, the Allies rapidly liberated most of France, Belgium, and Luxembourg. General Montgomery proposed an assault through Germany's Ruhr region, while Lieutenant General Bradley called for an attack further south into the Saar region; Eisenhower approved both operations. Eisenhower's decision to split up Allied forces and advance on a broad front strained logistics and gave the Germans time to retreat to more defensible positions closer to Germany.

In recognition of his senior position in the Allied command, on 20 December 1944, he was promoted to General of the Army, equivalent to the rank of field marshal in most European armies. (Note: William D. Leahy, George C. Marshall, Ernest King, Douglas MacArthur, Chester W. Nimitz, Eisenhower, and Henry "Hap" Arnold were all sequentially promoted to five-star rank in December 1944, establishing an order of seniority among the military's top officers. They were the first individuals to hold five-star rank during war-time service.) That same month, the Germans launched a surprise counter offensive, the Battle of the Bulge, which the Allies turned back in early 1945 after Eisenhower repositioned his armies and after improved weather allowed the Air Force to engage. Though many Allied soldiers lost their lives in the fighting, Germany suffered a decisive defeat in the battle.

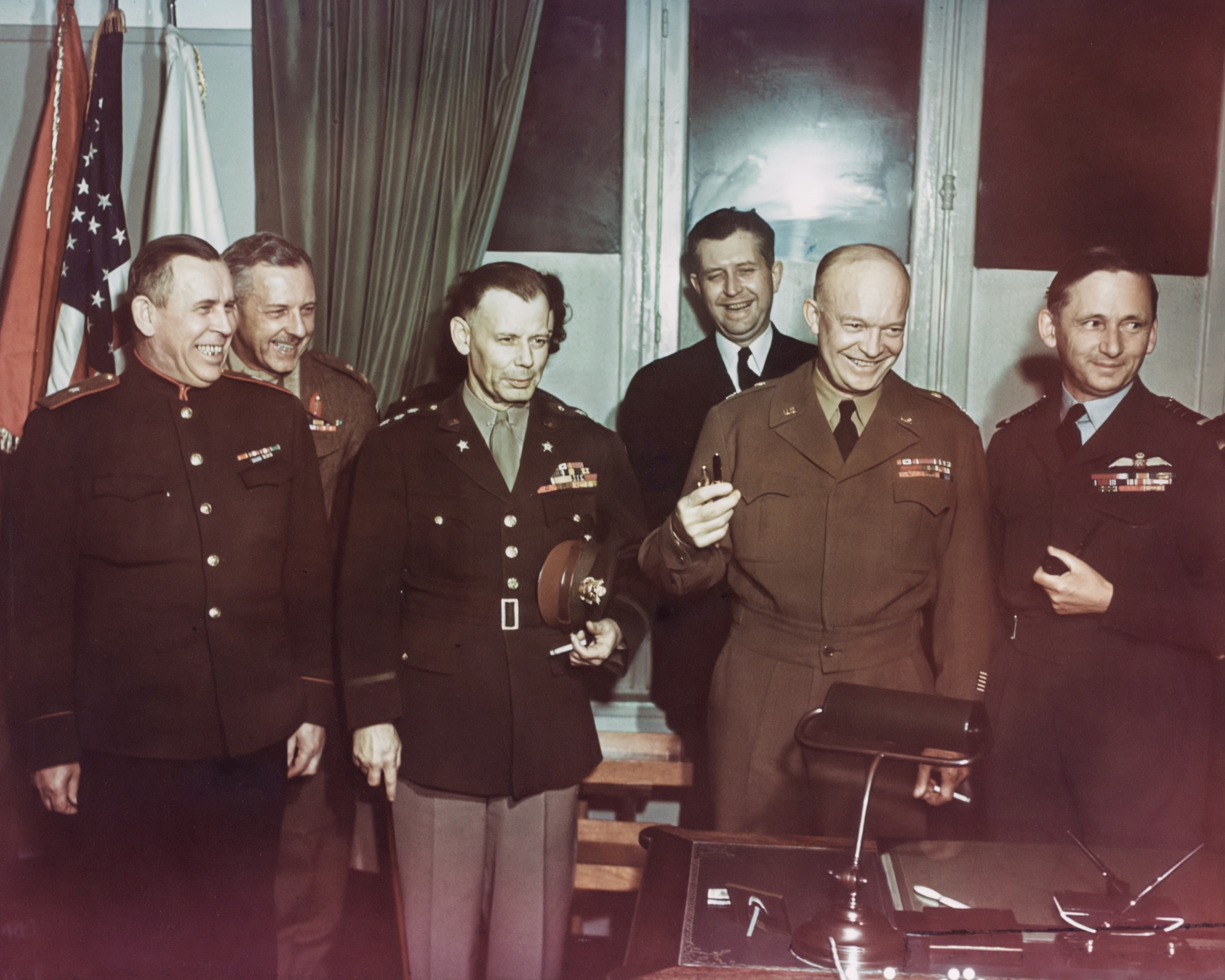
Eisenhower with Allied commanders following the signing of the German Instrument of Surrender at Reims. Walter Bedell Smith stands to Eisenhower's left and Arthur Tedder to the right

After the Battle of the Bulge and the success of a massive Soviet offensive in early 1945, Eisenhower sent Air Chief Marshal Tedder to the Soviet Union to help establish a joint strategy for the invasion of Germany. Eisenhower declined to engage the Soviets in a race for the German capital of Berlin, and instead prioritized linking up with Soviet forces as soon as possible. (Note: The February 1945 Yalta Conference had established four zones of occupation in Germany, meaning that the capture of German territory during World War II would not directly affect postwar control of Germany.) Allied soldiers reached the Rhine in early March, capturing a key bridge near the town of Remagen before the Germans could destroy it. German resistance quickly collapsed, and on 7 May, Eisenhower accepted the surrender of Germany.

== Postwar military service ==
=== Occupation zone commander, 1945 ===
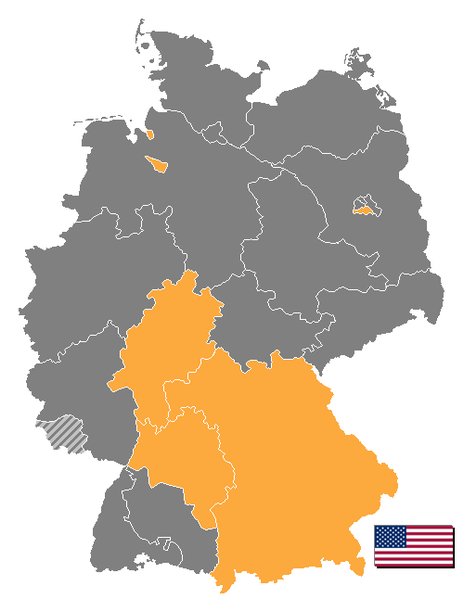
Eisenhower served as military governor of the American zone (highlighted) in Allied-occupied Germany from May through November 1945

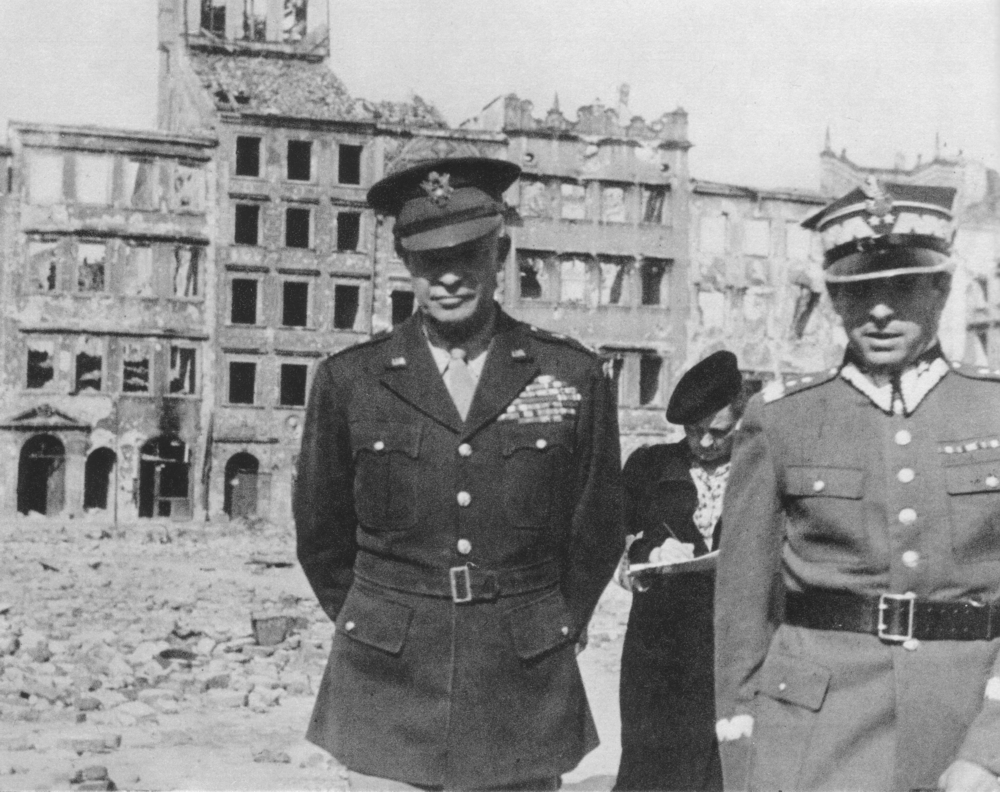
Eisenhower (left) in Warsaw, Poland, 1945, with Polish General Marian Spychalski

Eisenhower, Montgomery, Soviet Marshal Georgy Zhukov, and French General Jean de Lattre de Tassigny met on 5 June 1945, agreeing to establish the Allied Control Council, which provided for the joint governance of Germany by the four powers. Eisenhower became the military governor of the American occupation zone, located primarily in Southern Germany and headquartered at the IG Farben Building in Frankfurt am Main. In September 1945, Eisenhower removed General Patton from his command in Bavaria after the latter publicly expressed opposition to denazification. The removal of Patton sent a strong signal to that official policies regarding denazification would be strictly observed. Though Eisenhower aggressively purged ex-Nazis, his actions largely reflected the American attitude that the broad German populace were victims of the Nazis.

In response to the devastation in Germany, including food shortages and an influx of refugees, he arranged distribution of American food and medical equipment. Upon discovery of the Nazi concentration camps, he ordered camera crews to document evidence of the atrocities in them for use in the Nuremberg Trials. He reclassified German prisoners of war (POWs) in U.S. custody as Disarmed Enemy Forces (DEFs), who were no longer subject to the Geneva Convention. He also developed a strong working relationship with Soviet Marshal Georgy Zhukov, the commander of the Soviet occupation zone in Germany. At Zhukov's request, he visited Moscow, where he observed Russian culture and met with Soviet leader Joseph Stalin. Eisenhower learned of the secret development of the atomic bomb weeks before the atomic bombings of Hiroshima and Nagasaki; he expressed opposition to the bombings on the grounds that the use of atomic weaponry would increase post-war tensions.

=== Army Chief of Staff, 1945–1948 ===
Following the end of the World War II, Marshall retired in November 1945. On Marshall's recommendation, President Truman selected Eisenhower as the new Chief of Staff of the Army. His main task in that role was the demobilization of millions of soldiers, but he also advised the president on military policy and made numerous public appearances in order to maintain public support for the army. Concerned that rapid demobilization would deprive the army of necessary manpower in its duties and fully return the military to its small, pre-war state, Eisenhower joined Truman in calling for some form of universal military service. Congress rejected the idea of universal service, though it did extend the Selective Training and Service Act of 1940.

Eisenhower was convinced in 1946 that the Soviet Union did not want war and that friendly relations could be maintained; he strongly supported the new United Nations and favored its involvement in the control of atomic bombs. However, in formulating policies regarding the atomic bomb and relations with the Soviets, the administration of President Harry S. Truman largely ignored senior military leaders in favor of the State Department. By mid-1947, as East–West tensions over economic recovery in Germany and the Greek Civil War escalated, Eisenhower had come to agree with the containment policy of stopping Soviet expansion. Increasingly frustrated with his position of chief of staff, in 1948, he became the president of Columbia University, an Ivy League university in New York City. Nonetheless, he continued to advise the military on various matters. During his time at Columbia, he published his memoirs, which were titled Crusade in Europe.

=== NATO Supreme Commander, 1951–1952 ===
In June 1950, Communist-backed North Korea invaded U.S.-aligned South Korea, marking the start of the Korean War. The U.S. intervened on behalf of South Korea and inflicted several defeats on North Korean forces, but the war settled into a stalemate after the People's Republic of China committed forces to aid North Korea. Distressed by U.S. unpreparedness in the war, President Truman shook up his national security team and proposed dramatic increases in military spending. He asked Eisenhower to make the public case for the importance of U.S. commitments to North Atlantic Treaty Organization (NATO), a military alliance of Western states that had been formed in 1949. Though Eisenhower was unable to sway Robert A. Taft, a powerful Republican senator from Ohio, most other members of Congress agreed to support the alliance. In April 1951, after taking a leave of absence from Columbia, Eisenhower was confirmed by the Senate as the first Supreme Commander of NATO. In this role, he was charged with forging a cohesive military force capable of standing up to a potential Soviet invasion.

As Supreme Allied Commander, Eisenhower organized NATOs command structure and served as the alliance's public persona. Due to his notoriety and popular appeal, Eisenhower was the obvious choice to be the Republican candidate for president in 1952. Eisenhower was frequently approached by party leaders and asked to run for president. While he had his misgivings, he ultimately decided it was his duty to serve as president. When he decided to leave the Army and run for president in late May 1952, he was succeeded as Supreme Allied Commander by General Matthew B. Ridgway, who had most recently served as United Nations commander in Korea.

== Retirement ==
Eisenhower emerged as a popular political figure in the post-war years, and was widely considered to be a presidential contender. Along with Senator Robert A. Taft, Eisenhower emerged as one of the two major candidates in the 1952 Republican presidential primaries. After winning the 1952 New Hampshire primary, Eisenhower resigned from his NATO command and returned to the United States. He went on to win the 1952 presidential election, and served as the 34th President of the United States from 1953 to 1961. Upon becoming a candidate for president, on 18 July 1952, he resigned his commission in the Army. After leaving office, by an act of Congress, he was restored to the rank of General of the Army on 30 March 1961.

== Reputation ==
Eisenhower's contemporaries in the British and American militaries regarded him as an excellent administrator; Field Marshal Montgomery called him a "military statesman." Historian Russell Weigley ranked Eisenhower as the third-greatest U.S. Army leader after George Washington and Ulysses S. Grant. In developing this assessment, Weigley cited Eisenhower's World War II success at focusing on the strategic goal of a cross-Channel invasion to destroy the German Army, maturity of judgment with respect to operations and tactics, and military diplomacy that solidified the U.S.‑U.K. alliance and made possible America's wartime cooperation with the Soviet Union.

While many contemporaries and historians rate Eisenhower's military leadership highly, he received his share of criticism, often regarding his lack of combat experience or supposed failure to understand military strategy. Historian Adrian R. Lewis wrote that because Eisenhower lacked combat experience, he did not have the respect of his colleagues given to those who served in battle. Field Marshal Lord Alanbrooke wrote in his diary on 28 December 1942 that Eisenhower as a general was "hopeless. He submerges himself in politics and neglects his military duties, partly ... because he knows little if anything about military matters." General of the Army Omar Bradley wrote that Eisenhower "had little grasp of sound battlefield tactics." Admiral John L. Hall Jr., the commander of Amphibious Force 'O', which landed the 1st Division at Omaha Beach, wrote that Eisenhower "was one of the most overrated men in military history."

== List of assignments ==
=== Pre World War II ===
- Cadet, United States Military Academy, June 1911 – June 1915
- Furlough, June 1915 – September 1915
- 19th Infantry, Fort Sam Houston, September 1915 – February 1918, including command of Company F
- Tank Company Commander, Camp Meade, Maryland, February 1918 – March 1918
- Commander, Camp Colt, Pennsylvania, 30 March 1918 – 19 November 1918
- Infantry School, Camp Benning, Georgia, December 1918 – March 1919
- Executive Officer (later commander), 305th Tank Brigade, Camp Meade, Maryland, March 1919 – January 1922
- Staff officer, 20th Infantry Brigade, Panama Canal Zone, January 1922 – September 1924
- Staff officer and intramural football coach, Third Corps Area Headquarters, Baltimore, Maryland, September 1924 – August 1925
- Student, Command and General Staff College, August 1925 – June 1926
- Executive Officer, 24th Infantry Regiment, August 1926 – January 1927
- Staff officer, American Battle Monuments Commission, January 1927 – August 1927
- Student, Army War College, Washington, D.C., August 1927 – June 1928
- Staff officer, American Battle Monuments Commission, July 1928 – November 1929
- Aide to the Assistant Secretary of War, November 1929 – September 1932
- Student, Army Industrial College, September 1932 – June 1933
- Aide to the Chief of Staff, United States Army, June 1933 – 1 October 1935
- Assistant to the U.S. Army Military Advisor to the Philippines, 1 October 1935 – December 1939
- Commander, 1st Battalion, 15th Infantry Regiment, Fort Lewis, January 1940 – April 1940
- Executive Officer, 15th Infantry Regiment, Fort Lewis, April 1940 – November 1940
- Chief of Staff, 3rd Infantry Division, 30 November 1940 – 28 February 1941
- Chief of Staff, IX Corps, 1 March 1941 – 13 June 1941
- Chief of Staff, 3rd Army, 14 June 1941 – 18 December 1941

=== World War II ===
- Deputy Chief, War Plans Division, 19 December 1941 – 15 February 1942
- Chief, War Plans Division, 16 February 1942 – 8 March 1942
- Director, Operations Division, War Department General Staff, 9 March 1942 – 23 June 1942
- Commander, European Theater of Operations, United States Army (ETOUSA), 24 June 1942 – 3 February 1943
- Commander-in-Chief, Allied Force Headquarters (AFHQ), 14 August 1942 – 7 January 1944
- Commander-in-Chief, North African Theater of Operations, United States Army (NATOUSA), 4 February 1943 – 7 January 1944
- Supreme Allied Commander, Supreme Headquarters Allied Expeditionary Forces (SHAEF), 16 January 1944 – 14 July 1945
- Commander, European Theater of Operations, United States Army (ETOUSA), 16 January 1944 – 30 June 1945

=== Post war ===
- Military Governor, American Zone of Occupation, 5 June 1945 – 10 November 1945
- Commander, United States Forces European Theater (USFET), 1 July 1945 – 10 November 1945
- Chief of Staff, United States Army (COSUSA), 19 November 1945 – 6 February 1948
- President, Columbia University, New York City, 7 June 1948 – 19 December 1950
- Commander, U.S. Army European Command (EUCOM), 22 February 1951 – 30 May 1952
- Supreme Allied Commander Europe (SACEUR), 2 April 1951 – 30 May 1952

From December 1943 to November 1945, Eisenhower was "dual hatted" as commander of United States forces in Europe as well as commander of Allied armed forces.

Note: Sources vary as to titles and dates of assignment. The dates given above should be considered approximate.

== Orders, decorations and medals ==
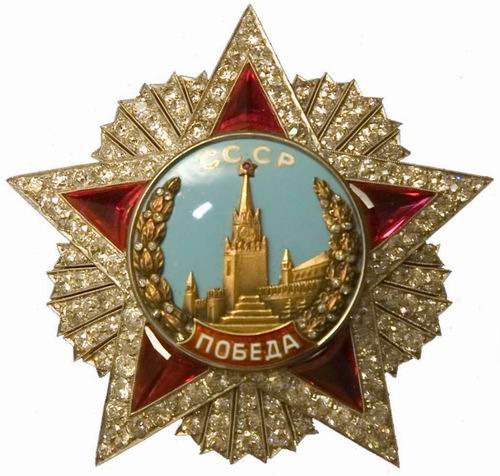
The star of the Soviet Order of Victory awarded to Eisenhower.

The coat of arms granted to Eisenhower upon his incorporation as a knight of the Danish Order of the Elephant in 1950. The anvil represents the fact that his name is derived from the German for "iron hewer".

Ribbons displayed as they would have been worn. Foreign decorations ordered by date awarded with national orders preceding military decorations and service medals. In cases when multiple decorations were conferred on the same date, the ribbons are ordered by relative precedence.

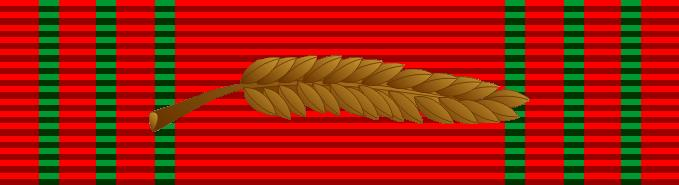

1st Row	Army Distinguished Service Medal with 4 oak leaf clusters (1922, 1943, 1945, 1948, 1952)	Navy Distinguished Service Medal (1947)	Legion of Merit (1943)	Mexican Border Service Medal (1918)
2nd Row	World War I Victory Medal (1919)	American Defense Service Medal with "Foreign Service" clasp (1942)	European-African-Middle Eastern; Campaign Medal with 9 campaign stars (1942)	World War II Victory Medal (1946)
3rd Row	Army of Occupation Medal with "Germany" clasp (1947)	National Defense Service Medal with oak leaf cluster (1953, 1966)	Grand Cordon; Order of Glory (French Tunisia)	Honorary Knight Grand Cross of the Most Honourable; Order of the Bath, Military Division (GCB) (United Kingdom)
4th Row	Grand Cross; Legion of Honor (Free France)	Grand Cordon; Order of Ouissam Alaouite (French Morocco)	Order of Suvorov, 1st Class (Soviet Union)	Virtuti Militari, 1st Class (Polish government-in-exile)
5th Row	Order of Polonia Restituta (Polish government-in-exile)	Order of Victory (Soviet Union)	Order of Merit (United Kingdom)	Grand Cross with Gold Badge; National Order of Honour and Merit (Haiti)
6th Row	Knight Grand Cross; Order of the Netherlands Lion	Grand Cordon; Order of Leopold with palm (Belgium)	Grand Cross; Order of the Oak Crown (Luxembourg)	Order of Liberation (France)
7th Row	Order of the Cross of Grunwald; 1st Class (Polish Provisional Government)	Order of the White Lion (Czechoslovakia)	Military Order of the White Lion, 1st Class Gold Star (Czechoslovakia)	Grand Cross; Order of St. Olav (Norway)
8th Row	Knight; Order of the Elephant (Denmark)	Grand Commander; Order of St. Olav (Norway)	Grand Cross; Order of Military Merit (Brazil)	Grand Cross with Swords; Order of George I (Kingdom of Greece)
9th Row	Grand Cross; Order of Aeronautical Merit (Brazil)	Grand Cross; Order of the Southern Cross (Brazil)	Grand Cross; Order of Vasco Núñez de Balboa (Panama)	Collar of the Order of the Aztec Eagle (Mexico)
10th Row	Order of Military Merit, 1st Class (Mexico)	Grand Cross; Order of Merit (Chile)	Cross of Military Merit; First Class (Guatemala)	Grand Cordon with Star; The Most High Order of Ismail (Egypt)
11th Row	Grand Cordon; Order of the Cloud and Banner (Republic of China)	Knight Grand Cross; Military Order of Italy (Italy)	Collar of the Order of Solomon (Ethiopian Empire)	Order of Abdon Calderón, 1st Class (Ecuador)
12th Row	Grand Cross; Order of the Liberator General San Martín (Argentina)	Knight Grand Cross; Order of the Redeemer (Kingdom of Greece)	Grand Cross with Swords; Order pro Merito Melitensi (Sovereign Military Order of Malta)	Grand Cross; Order of the Holy Sepulchre (Holy See)
13th Row	Grand Cordon; Order of the Queen of Sheba (Ethiopian Empire)	Collar of the Order of Manuel Amador Guerrero (Panama)	Special Class of the Order of Muhammad (Morocco)	Grand Crescent; Order of Pakistan
14th Row	Grand Collar (Raja); Order of Sikatuna (Philippines)	Knight; Order of the Royal House of Chakri (Thailand)	Grand Cordon of the Supreme; Order of the Chrysanthemum (Japan)	Chief Commander; Philippine Legion of Honor
15th Row	Grand Decoration of Honour in Gold with Sash (Austria)	Distinguished Service Star (Commonwealth of the Philippines)	Médaille militaire (France)	Croix de Guerre 1939–1945 with Palm (Free France)
16th Row	Croix de guerre 1940–1945 with Palm (Belgium)	Military Medal (Luxembourg)	Czechoslovak War Cross 1939–1945	Medal of Civic Merit (Mexico)
17th Row	Commemorative War Cross; 1941-1945 (Yugoslavia)	Africa Star with '8' and '1' devices (United Kingdom)	War Medal (Brazil)	Campaign Medal (Brazil)

== Dates of rank ==
No insignia	Cadet, United States Military Academy: 14 June 1911
No pin insignia in 1915	Second Lieutenant, Regular Army: 12 June 1915
	First Lieutenant, Regular Army: 1 July 1916
	Captain, Regular Army: 15 May 1917
	Major, National Army: 17 June 1918
	Lieutenant Colonel, National Army: 20 October 1918
	Captain, Regular Army: 30 June 1920 (Reverted to permanent rank.)
	Major, Regular Army: 2 July 1920
	Captain, Regular Army: 4 November 1922 (Discharged as major and appointed as captain due to reduction of Army.)
	Major, Regular Army: 26 August 1924
	Lieutenant Colonel, Regular Army: 1 July 1936
	Colonel, Army of the United States: 6 March 1941
	Brigadier General, Army of the United States: 29 September 1941
	Major General, Army of the United States: 27 March 1942
	Lieutenant General, Army of the United States: 7 July 1942
	General, Army of the United States: 11 February 1943
	Brigadier General, Regular Army: 30 August 1943
	Major General, Regular Army: 30 August 1943
	General of the Army, Army of the United States: 20 December 1944
	General of the Army, Regular Army: 11 April 1946

Source: Official Register of Commissioned Officers of the United States Army, 1946. pg. 205.

Note: Eisenhower retired from the Army on 31 May 1952, and resigned his commission on 18 July 1952, to run for president. He left office as president on 20 January 1961, and was restored to active duty on 30 March 1961.

== Notes ==
Military offices
Preceded by Maj. Gen. James E. Chaney	Commanding General of U.S. Army Europe; 1942–1943	Succeeded by Lt. Gen. Frank M. Andrews
Preceded by Gen. Jacob L. Devers	Commanding General of U.S. Army Europe; 1944–1945	Succeeded by Gen. Joseph T. McNarney
New title	Military Governor of the U.S. Occupation Zone in Germany; 1945	Succeeded by Gen. George S. Patton
Preceded by Gen. George Marshall	Chief of Staff of the United States Army; 1945–1948	Succeeded by Gen. Omar Bradley
New title	Supreme Allied Commander Europe (NATO); 1951–1952	Succeeded by Gen. Matthew Ridgway
