= Jerzy Główczewski =

Polish fighter pilot and architect

Jerzy Eligiusz Głowczewski
- Born: 19 November 1922; Warsaw, Poland
- Died: 13 April 2020 (aged 97); New York City, United States
- Military career
- Allegiance: Poland
- Branch: Polish Air Force; Royal Air Force
- Service years: 1941–1947
- Service number: Royal Air Force (RAF) service number 704204
- Units: No. 308 Polish Fighter Squadron "City of Kraków" with Spitfire type Spitfire LF.IX, ZF-U (MJ396) LF Mk.XVIe TE184 (G-MXVI) with sign ZF-U
- Conflicts: World War II; 100 sorties over France, Belgium, Holland, and Germany. Battle of Ghent, 1 January 1945.
- Awards: Three times the Cross of Valour (Poland) (Polish: Krzyż Walecznych), Air Medal (Medal Lotniczy), Pilot's Field Badge (No. 1696, Polowym Znakiem Pilota)
- Other work: Architect

Jerzy Eligiusz Główczewski (pronunciation: Woof-djewski, 19 November 1922 – 13 April 2020) was a Polish fighter pilot of the Second World War and afterwards an architect in Poland, Egypt, other Arab countries and the US. He died of complications from COVID-19 at the age of 97 and was the last surviving pilot of the Polish Air Forces in France and Great Britain. He should not be confused with the Polish saxophonist Jerzy Główczewski.

== Biography ==
=== Young years ===
Główczewski was born in Warsaw in 1922 to Kazimierz Główczewski, who owned a lithographic printing business, and Józefa Bernhard. After Kazimierz died in 1929 in a traffic accident she managed the company and married Witoldrządkowski in 1938. Young Główczewski went to a primary school in Warsaw and starting in 1935 attended a Gymnasium in Warsaw. A rebellious youngster, he was sent in 1938 to a strict Jesuit boarding Gymnasium in then Polish Khyriv.

=== Second World War ===
After the outbreak of the Second World War on 4 September 1939, his stepfather and Główczewski fled the country. Główczewski reached Romania on 17 September 1939, where he stayed in Bucharest until November 1940. Then he moved to Mandatory Palestine, where he took his final exams at the Polish school in Tel Aviv in July 1941. Główczewski joined the Polish army in Palestine, received basic training there and served with the Polish Independent Carpathian Rifle Brigade in Egypt and Libya on the British side. In June 1942, he volunteered to the Polish Air Forces in France and Great Britain to become a fighter pilot and was sent to Britain where he trained at Hucknall, Brighton, Newton, Morpeth and Rednal. Główczewski joined No. 308 Polish Fighter Squadron "City of Kraków" on 18 September 1944 and flew exactly 100 sorties over France, Belgium, Holland, and Germany in a Spitfire. On 1 January 1945, he took part in the Battle of Ghent and shot down a German Focke-Wulf Fw 190 aircraft near the Sint-Denijs-Westrem airport. (This hit counted only half as the Focke-Wulf was also struck by artillery from the ground.)

=== Later life and death ===
==== Poland ====
After the end of the war Główczewski returned to Poland in 1947, where he joined the Warsaw Aeroclub (Aeroklub Warszawski). In June 1949 the authorities revoked his pilot's license, which was returned to him only in 1957. In October 1947 Główczewski enrolled at the Faculty of Architecture of the Warsaw University of Technology, and graduated in 1952. As an architect, he participated in the reconstruction of war-damaged Warsaw and its historic monuments. He contributed to the construction of the Stadion Dziesięciolecia (10th-Anniversary Stadium), Poland's national stadium in Warsaw, which was inaugurated on 22 July 1955. In 1958 he helped with archaeological excavations in the Crimea under the supervision of professor Kazimierz Michałowski. Główczewski married Irena 'Lenta' Henisz and they had a daughter, Klara Główczewska.

==== United States and Egypt ====
Visiting the United States in 1961 on a Ford Foundation grant, Główczewski settled there in 1962, and taught at North Carolina State University as a professor in the academic year 1962/1963. In 1964 or 1965 the Ford Foundation sent him to Aswan, Egypt, to redevelop this ancient city, where the Soviets were building the Aswan Dam. This project was interrupted by the Six-Day War of 1967. Główczewski befriended a Cairo professor, Boutros Boutros-Ghali, who later was to become secretary-general of the United Nations. In New York City he worked with the United Nations, lectured on architecture at the Pratt Institute in Brooklyn with his daughter Klara, and wrote his memoirs in three books in Polish and one combined book in English, The Accidental Immigrant. A Memoir (2007).

Główczewski died in New York City, on 13 April 2020, at the age of 97, from complications of COVID-19. He was one of the thousand individuals mentioned in the New York Times' U.S. Deaths Near 100,000, An Incalculable Loss article. In August 2021, his ashes were buried in the family grave at Warsaw.

== Books by Główczewski ==
- Wojak z przypadku (Translated title: A warrior by chance). Warszawa: Most, 2003. ISBN 978-83-906-3302-2. 277 pp. In Polish.
- Optymista mimo wszystko (Still an optimist). Warszawa: Most, 2004. ISBN 83-919839-2-7, ISBN 9788391983928. 270 pp. In Polish.
- Moja Ameryka: tak i nie (My America: yes and no). Warszawa: Most, 2006. ISBN 8391983986, ISBN 978-83-919-8398-0. 269 pp. In Polish.
  - English version combining the three Polish books mentioned above: The Accidental Immigrant. A Memoir, New York: Xlibris, 2007. ISBN 142578268X, ISBN 978-1425782689. 452 pp.
- Ostatni pilot myśliwca. Wspomnienia (The last fighter pilot. Reminiscences). Warszawa: Wydawnictwo Naukowe PWN, 2020. ISBN 8301213213, ISBN 978-83-011-9199-3. 790 pp. In Polish.
