= Peter Brancazio =

American physicist and professor (1939–2020)

Peter John Brancazio (March 22, 1939 – April 25, 2020) was an American professor of physics at Brooklyn College for more than 30 years, whose observatory he temporarily headed. He was best known for his work on physics in sports.

== Personal life ==
Brancazio was born in Astoria, Queens, New York. His interest in physics was sparked when his girlfriend and future wife Ronnie Kramer gave him a telescope.

He studied engineering science at New York University (NYU) and graduated with a bachelor's degree in 1959. He later studied at Columbia University and gained his master's in nuclear engineering a year later. Brancazio started teaching physics at Brooklyn College in 1963 while studying astrophysics at NYU, working toward a PhD. He taught physics at the college until his retirement in 1997. After that, he taught adult education courses at Brooklyn College and Queens College for a while. Finally, from 1999 to 2019, he taught courses on religion, science and astronomy at Hutton House, a branch of Long Island University. In recognition of his achievements, he was awarded a Tow Professorship.

Peter Brancazio died from COVID-19 on April 25, 2020, in Manhasset, New York, amid its pandemic. He left two sons, his wife, and several grandchildren.

== Work ==
In 1981, he published his first work on sports physics in the American Journal of Physics, in which he found the perfect throw angle in baseball. In 1983, his work on the physics of judging a fly ball were noted by the New Scientist. In 1984, his book Sport Science was published, where he "claim[ed] to have discovered the way to make a pure shooter by following the laws of physics" and "discuss[ed] a variety of physics concepts using sports".

Although he was personally more interested in basketball, he was best known for his work on baseball. A number of terms he introduced are now part of the technical vocabulary of baseball.

== Publications ==
- The Nature of Physics, McMillian 1975, ISBN 9780023135002
- Sport Science: Physical Laws and Optimum Performance, Simon & Schuster 1985, ISBN 9780671554385

== See also ==
- U.S. deaths near 100,000, an incalculable loss – front page of The New York Times, detailing deaths from COVID-19, which mentioned Brancazio.
