= Emma Weigley =

American nutritionist (1933–2020)

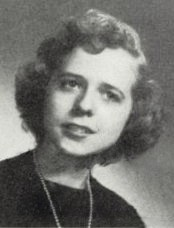
- Seifrit, from her 1950 high school yearbook
- Born: Emma Seifrit; January 27, 1933; Reading, Pennsylvania, U.S.
- Died: April 18, 2020 (aged 87); South Philadelphia, Pennsylvania, U.S.
- Occupation: Professor of nutrition
- Spouse: Russell Weigley

Emma Seifrit Weigley (née Seifrit; January 27, 1933 – April 18, 2020) was an American professor of nutrition. Her husband was military historian Russell Weigley.

== Early life ==
Emma Seifrit was born in Reading, Pennsylvania. She graduated from Albright College in 1954. She completed doctoral studies in nutrition at New York University in 1971, with a thesis titled Sarah Tyson Rorer (1849-1937), a Biographical Study.

== Career ==
Emma Seifrit was a clinical instructor in nutrition at Reading Hospital after college, and won an essay award from the American Dietetic Association in 1960. She taught home economics at Albright College and nutrition at Drexel University; she was also an adjunct professor of nursing at the University of Pennsylvania.

Publications by Weigley included "The High Fat Diet" (1963), "The Philadelphia Chef: Mastering the Art of Philadelphia Cookery" (1972), "'It might have been euthenics': The Lake Placid Conferences and the Home Economics Movement" (1974), "The Professionalization of Home Economics" (1976), Sarah Tyson Rorer: The Nation's Instructress in Dietetics and Cookery (1977), a biography based on her dissertation, "Infant Feeding Practices: A Century of Transitions" (1988), and Robinson's Basic Nutrition and Diet Therapy (1997), a textbook. She also co-edited Essays on History of Nutrition and Dietetics (1967) with E. Neige Todhunter, a collection of essays published on the fiftieth anniversary of the American Dietetic Association. The collection included her own essay, "Food in the days of the Declaration of Independence". Her collection of Sarah Tyson Rorer papers is housed at the American Philosophical Society library. She also wrote the article on Rorer for the American National Biography.

== Personal life and death ==
Emma Seifrit married Russell Weigley in 1963. They had two children, Jared and Catherine. Her husband died in 2004. She died from COVID-19 in South Philadelphia on April 18, 2020, at age 87. Weigley was one of the thousand names included in The New York Times cover story on May 24, 2020, "U.S. Deaths Near 100,000, An Incalculable Loss".
