= Sterling Maddox =

American civil engineer and politician (1941–2020)

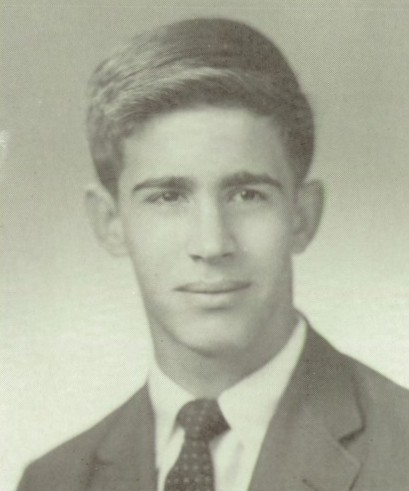
- Maddox as a High School senior, 1959

Member of the Maryland House of Delegates for Montgomery County's 1st District
- In office 1970–1974

Personal details
- Born: May 23, 1941 Washington, D.C., U.S.
- Died: March 24, 2020 (aged 78) Arlington, Virginia, U.S.
- Cause of death: COVID-19
- Party: Democratic Party
- Education: George Washington University
- Occupation: Civil engineer

Sterling "Ruffin" Maddox (May 23, 1941 – March 24, 2020) was an American civil engineer and politician who served as a member of the Maryland House of Delegates for Montgomery County's 1st District from 1970 to 1974.

== Early life and career ==
Maddox grew up in Potomac, Maryland. He attended the Landon School and Lehigh University. He traveled to Vietnam as a civilian engineer for the U.S. military. After returning, he graduated from George Washington University with a Bachelor of Science.

== Later life and death ==
After his time in office he became a developer, helping to establish neighborhoods in the region. He then served as a real estate agent for Washington Fine Properties for nearly 15 years. Maddox lived in Bethesda, Maryland, and Kent Island, Maryland before he moved into a assisted living facility in Arlington, Virginia.

Maddox died from complications of COVID-19 at age 78; at the time of his death he was suffering from Parkinson's disease and dementia. He was among the thousand people mentioned in the New York Times article U.S. Deaths Near 100,000, An Incalculable Loss. He was survived by his two daughters.
