= Georgianna Glose =

American nun and activist (1946–2020)

- Born: Georgianna Inez Glose; December 1, 1946; Astoria, Queens, New York
- Died: April 28, 2020 (aged 73); Brooklyn, New York
- Occupation: Social activist
- Known for: Dominican sister; founder and director, Fort Greene Strategic Neighborhood Action Partnership

Georgianna Inez Glose (December 1, 1946 – April 28, 2020) was an American activist and Dominican religious sister, based in New York City.

== Early life ==
Glose was born in Astoria, Queens, the daughter of Rudolph Glose and Helen Bohunicky Glose. She survived polio as a child. She attended Molloy College as a young woman. She earned a master's degree at Hunter College and completed doctoral studies in social welfare at the Graduate Center of the City University of New York in 1996, with a dissertation titled "Take the blinders from your vision, take the padding from your ears," about "the daily incidences of institutional racism in the lives of forty African-American Roman Catholic sisters and former sisters".

== Career ==
Glose was a teaching sister at a Roman Catholic elementary school, and was a member of the Sisters of St. Dominic religious community in Amityville, New York until 1969, when she left to join an experimental collaborative ministry with other sisters and three priests at St. Michael and St. Edward Church in Brooklyn. She was founder and director of the Fort Greene Strategic Neighborhood Action Partnership (SNAP), establishing educational and support programs for the neighborhood. She testified before a Congressional committee in 1982, on the social impact of the Reagan administration's economic recovery programs. She and two other sisters reported evidence of sexual abuse by priests in her parish to the Diocese of Brooklyn in 1993, and later in a public statement. She co-authored a 2011 study of infant mortality prevention in Brooklyn's Brownsville neighborhood.

Glose served as chair of the human services department at New York City College of Technology, head of the Mid-Atlantic Consortium for Human Services, executive director of the Brooklyn-wide Interagency Council on the Aging, and board member of the Myrtle Avenue Revitalization Project (MARP).

== Personal life ==
Glose died on April 28, 2020, at age 73 from complications of COVID-19 in Brooklyn during the COVID-19 pandemic in New York City. She was one of the thousand names included in The New York Times front-page article U.S. Deaths Near 100,000, An Incalculable Loss
