= Ilona Murai Kerman =

American dancer (1923/24–2020)

- Born: Ellen Josephine Muray; July 19 1924; Passaic, New Jersey
- Died: April 8, 2020; New Hyde Park, New York
- Occupation: Dancer
- Years active: 1940s–1970s
- Relatives: Nickolas Muray (uncle)

Ilona Murai Kerman (1923 or 1924 – April 8, 2020), born Ellen Josephine Muray, was an American dancer.

== Early life ==
Ellen Josephine Muray was born in Passaic, New Jersey, the daughter of Stephen Muray and Ethel Muray. Her parents were born in Hungary. Photographer Nickolas Muray was her uncle. She attended Public School 89 in Queens, and began as a dancer with the Metropolitan Opera Ballet in 1940, at age 15, and described as "the youngest dancer ever taken into its ranks" at the time.

== Career ==
Murai danced with the Metropolitan Opera Ballet from 1940 to 1948, in productions of Samson et Dalila (1940), Tannhäuser (1943, 1944, 1945, 1946, 1947, 1948), Aida (1945, 1946, 1947, 1948), Mignon (1945), Le Coq d'Or (1945), La Gioconda (1945, 1946, 1947, 1948), Manon (1947, 1948), A Midsummer Night's Dream (1947), and La Traviata (1947, 1948). She danced at Jacob's Pillow in Winesburg, Ohio (1958), and in several Herbert Ross works, including the world premiere of Caprichos (1950) with the American Ballet Theatre.

She made her Broadway debut in 1949, and appeared as a dancer in several shows until 1963, including Touch and Go (1949–1950), Bless You All (1950–1951), Paint Your Wagon (1951–1952), John Murray Anderson's Almanac (1953–1954), By the Beautiful Sea (1954), Shangri-La (1956), Goldilocks (1958–1959), and The Girl Who Came to Supper (1963–1964). She danced in the European company of Oklahoma!, and on several early television programs. She was active as a choreographer and taught dance on Long Island after 1970.

== Personal life ==
Ilona Murai married playwright and actor Sheppard Kerman (1928–1991) in 1957, in San Francisco; they had a daughter, Christina. She experienced dementia before she died in 2020, from coronavirus, aged 96 years, at a care home in New Hyde Park. Her name was included on the front page of The New York Times on May 24, 2020, under the headline "U. S. Deaths Near 100,000, An Incalculable Loss". She was included in the roster of deaths at the Episcopal Actors' Guild annual memorial service in November 2020.
