= E. Neige Todhunter =

Nutritionist and writer

- Born: 6 July 1901; Burwood, Christchurch
- Died: 1991 (aged 89–90)
- Occupations: Nutritionist, writer

Elizabeth Neige Todhunter (6 July 1901 – 1991) was a New Zealand born American nutritionist and writer. Her lectures and publications promoted interest in the history of nutrition science.

== Biography ==
Todhunter was born on a farm at Burwood, Christchurch. She was educated at the University of Otago where she obtained her M.Sc. in 1925. She was a laboratory assistant to nutritionist Lillian Storms Coover at the University of Otago. She developed a life-long interest in dieting and nutrition.

Todhunter co-authored her first publication with Storms in 1925. The eight-page pamphlet was entitled "Vegetables as Necessities", which argued for the protective value of consuming vegetables. The authors argued that vegetables should not be restricted to dinner but also with lunch or tea dishes. In 1928, Todhunter authored her first research paper with Storms in the Journal of Home Economics.

Todhunter moved to the United States and planned to study with Henry C. Sherman. She first studied home economics at Iowa State University. She studied nutrition under Sherman at Columbia University and obtained her PhD in 1933. She was Associate Professor of Home Economics at the State College of Washington (1934–1941). Todhunter was Director of the Research Laboratory of Human Nutrition at the University of Alabama, and was Professor and Dean of the Department of Food and Nutrition (1953–1966). Todhunter was President of the American Dietetic Association (1957–1958).

After Todhunter retired in 1966, she was Visiting Professor of Nutrition at Vanderbilt University until her death in 1991.

The Neige Todhunter Memorial Doctoral Award is currently awarded by the Academy of Nutrition and Dietetics.

== Selected publications ==
- Everyday Nutrition (1935)
- Factors Affecting the Nutritive Value of Foods (1939)
- Nutrition Experiments for Classroom Teaching (1940)
- Everyday Nutrition for School Children (1945)
- Nutrition Teaching: Suggestions and Devices (1953)
- The Story of Nutrition (1959)
- Some Aspects of the History of Dietetics (1965)
- Development of Knowledge in Nutrition (1967)
- Essays on History of Nutrition and Dietetics (with Adelia M. Beeuwkes and Emma Seifrit Weigley, 1967)
- Food and Man (with Miriam Lowenberg, Eva D. Wilson, Moira C. Feeney and Jane R. Savage, 1968)
