= U.S. Deaths Near 100,000, An Incalculable Loss =

2020 New York Times front page

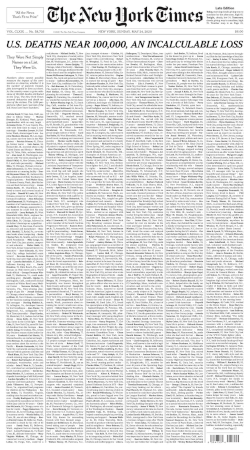
Front page of The New York Times on May 24, 2020

"U.S. Deaths Near 100,000, an Incalculable Loss" was the front-page article of The New York Times on May 24, 2020; the Sunday of the Memorial Day weekend. Its subheader read "They were not simply names on a list. They were us." It contained one thousand obituaries of individuals from across the United States who had died from COVID-19 during the pandemic, as the U.S. death toll reached 100,000.

== Background ==
The article was intended to convey the vastness and variety of the tragedies resulting from the pandemic by personalizing them, countering data fatigue from constant reporting on the pandemic. Assistant graphics editor Simone Landon lead a team of researchers in searching obituaries that listed COVID-19 as the cause of death and extracting names and key personal details.

The list was assembled by researcher Alain Delaquérière through various online sources for obituaries and death notices. A team of editors read them and gleaned phrases that depicted the uniqueness of each life lost. Clinton Cargill, assistant editor on the National desk, co-directed the editing process with Landon. Other key figures include Matt Ruby, deputy editor of Digital News Design; Annie Daniel, a software engineer; and the graphics editors Jonathan Huang, Richard Harris and Lazaro Gamio. Andrew Sondern, an art director, did the print design.

== Reception ==
An image of the front page was tweeted by the Times the Saturday before print publication; it had 61,000 retweets and more than 116,000 likes within hours. This tweet was later deleted and replaced with an image of the late print edition after the discovery that one man identified as a COVID-19 victim had in fact been killed in a homicide. Many noted that the front page resembled those of newspapers in the late 1800s or early 1900s due to its lack of large headers or photos.

A number of publications again highlighted those that matched their target demographic: KNXV-TV the eight from Arizona, Nola.com the 20 from Louisiana, Boston.com the 80 from Massachusetts, KOCO-TV the three Oklahomans, Philippine Daily Inquirer the two Filipinos, The National Herald the twelve Greek-Americans.

Princeton University Library made it part of its Graphic Arts Collection.

Its publication was followed by the first week of the George Floyd protests. This inspired the art director Adrianne Benzion and freelance copywriter Jessica McEwan to duplicate the cover with 350 names of Black people who died following an interaction with the police since 2000. Instead of a short eulogy, the status of each victim’s case is stated, a large share of which read “pending investigation.”

The cover design was ranked 19th in Ad Age's "30 Best Creative Brand Moves of 2020".

== Legacy ==
As the death toll continued to mount, the status of 100,000 deaths as being incalculable was referenced by journalists in order to express how hard a multitude of that figure was to put into frame or how callous later headlines by the Times were in comparison.

== Notable deaths ==
Among the obituaries there were a number of notable deaths:

- Bennie G. Adkins
- Reggie Bagala
- Beryl Bernay
- Robert Barnes
- Mark Blum
- Lorena Borjas
- Patricia Bosworth
- Peter J. Brancazio
- Carole Brookins
- Floyd Cardoz
- Stanley Chera
- Romi Cohn
- John Horton Conway
- Cristina
- Steve Dalkowski
- Noach Dear
- Joe Diffie
- David Driskell
- April Dunn
- Joseph Feingold
- Margit Feldman
- Richard Fenno
- Lila Fenwick
- Alan Finder
- Philip Foglia
- Robert H. Garff
- William H. Gerdts
- Annie Glenn
- Gerald O. Glenn
- Georgianna Glose
- Jerzy Główczewski
- James T. Goodrich
- Henry Graff
- Henry Grimes
- Alyce Chenault Gullattee
- Wynn Handman
- Samuel Hargress II
- Rhoda Hatch
- William B. Helmreich
- Roy Horn
- Motoko Fujishiro Huthwaite
- Milena Jelinek
- Donald Kennedy
- Ilona Murai Kerman
- Lee Konitz
- Madeline Kripke
- Vincent Lionti
- Mike Longo
- Iris Love
- Sterling Maddox
- James Mahoney
- Ellis Marsalis Jr.
- Ralph McGehee
- Michael McKinnell
- Terrence McNally
- Carlos Ernesto Escobar Mejía
- Alan Merrill
- Fernando Miteff
- Richard Passman
- Yaakov Perlow
- Dennis G. Peters
- John Pfahl
- Nita Pippins
- Bucky Pizzarelli
- John Prine
- Walter Robb
- Freddy Rodriguez
- Joel Rogosin
- Mary Roman
- Wallace Roney
- Arlene Saunders
- Adam Schlesinger
- Gerald Slater
- Troy Sneed
- Michael Sorkin
- Ann Sullivan
- Fred the Godson
- Ella King Russell Torrey
- Emma Weigley
- Yu Lihua

There were also several that had a significant link to a notable person or institution:

- Peter Bainum, doctoral advisor to aerospace engineer Aprille Ericsson-Jackson
- Bob Barnum, descendant of P. T. Barnum
- Stephen J. Chamberlin Jr., son of WWII general Stephen J. Chamberlin Sr.
- Robert F. Brady Jr., brother of senator Michael Brady
- Julie Butler, mother of writer Zora Howard
- Dante Dennis Flagello, son of opera singer Ezio Flagello
- Theresa Elloie, mother-in-law to rapper Mia X
- Jimmy Glenn, boxing coach of Floyd Patterson, Michael Spinks, Jameel McCline, Aaron Davis and Bobby Cassidy
- Norman Gulamerian, co-founder of Utrecht Art Supplies
- Bobby Hebert Sr., father of American football player Bobby Hebert Jr.
- Donald Reed Herring, brother of senator Elizabeth Warren
- Estelle Kestenbaum, former secretary of judge Edwin Stern
- Carole and Barry Kaye, benefactors of the Florida Atlantic University College of Business
- Peter Laker, father of journalist Barbara Laker
- Artemis Nazarian, benefactor of the AGBU Manoogian-Demirdjian School
- Sheena Miles, mother of politician Tom Miles
- Marguerite Peyser, widow of politician Peter A. Peyser
- Lloyd Cornelius Porter, brother of artist Gregory Porter
- Robert C. Samuels, son of writer Charles Samuels
- Bernard David Seckler, doctoral student of mathematician Joseph Keller
- Ruth E. Shinn, sister of theologian Roger L. Shinn
- Jaimala Singh, descendant of the poet Vir Singh
- Bettie London Traxler, mother of jurist William Byrd Traxler Jr.
- John C. West Jr., son of former South Carolina governor John C. West Sr.
