= Sarah Tyson Rorer =

American food writer and pioneer in the field of domestic science

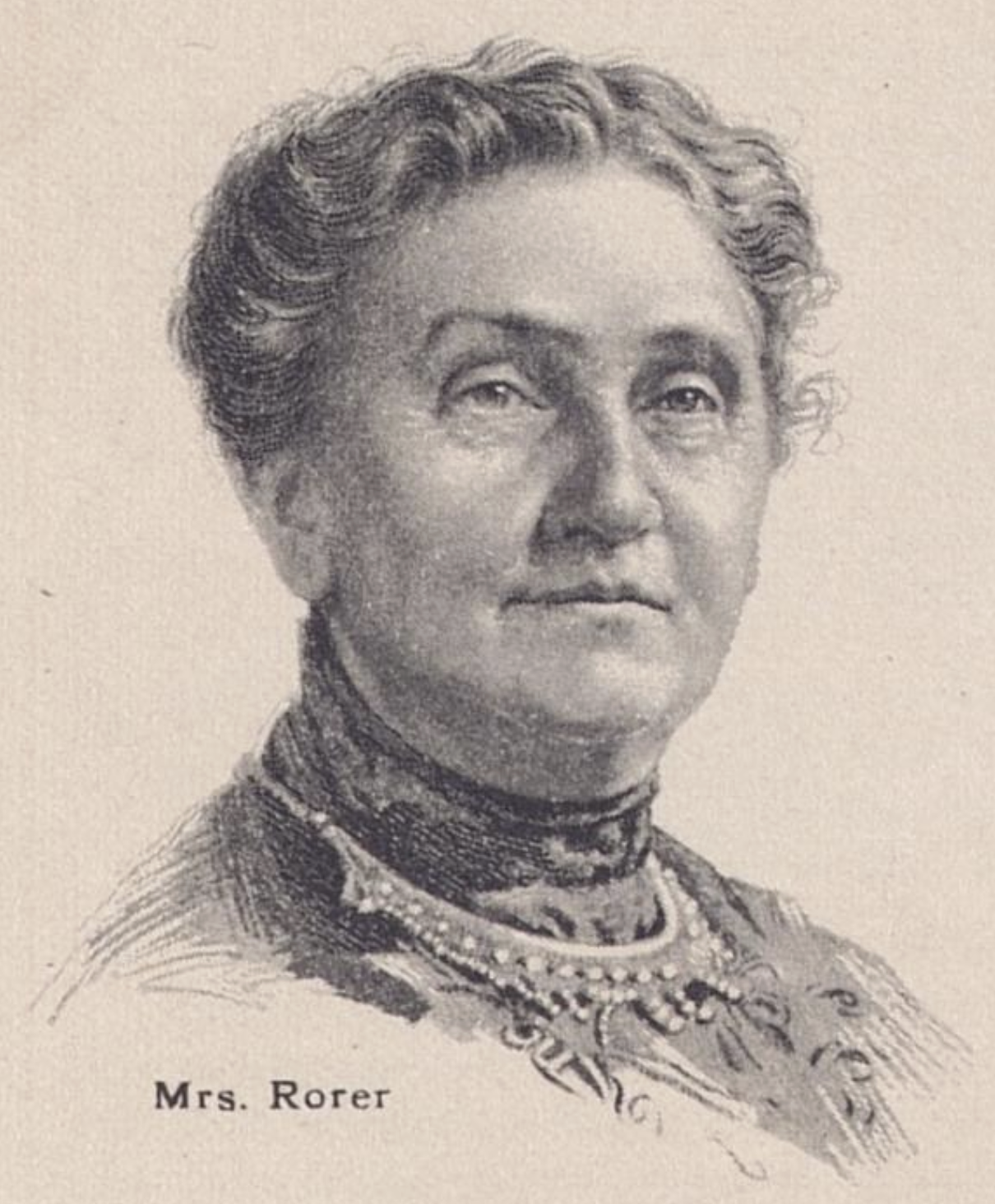
- Rorer, c. 1912
- Born: 18 October 1849; Richboro, Pennsylvania
- Died: 27 December 1937 (aged 88); Colebrook, Pennsylvania
- Occupations: Dietitian, food writer

Signature
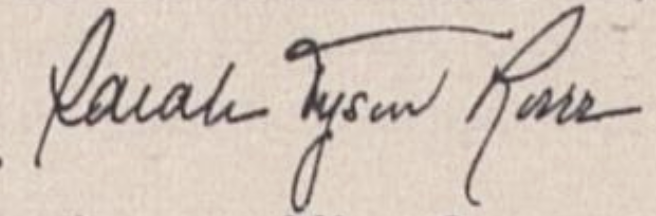

Sarah Tyson Rorer (18 October 1849 – 27 December 1937) was an American food writer and pioneer in the field of domestic science. Rorer has been described as the first American dietitian.

== Biography ==
She was born in Richboro, Pennsylvania, the daughter of Charles Tyson Heston, a pharmacist, and Elizabeth Sagers. Rorer received her early education in East Aurora, New York, and was educated in cooking at the New Century Club in Philadelphia. She had completed courses at the Philadelphia Women's Medical College in the hopes of becoming a pharmacist at the time, but was asked to take over as the Club's teacher after the original instructor left. After she completed school, she herself became a teacher of cooking and dietetics at the New Century Club.

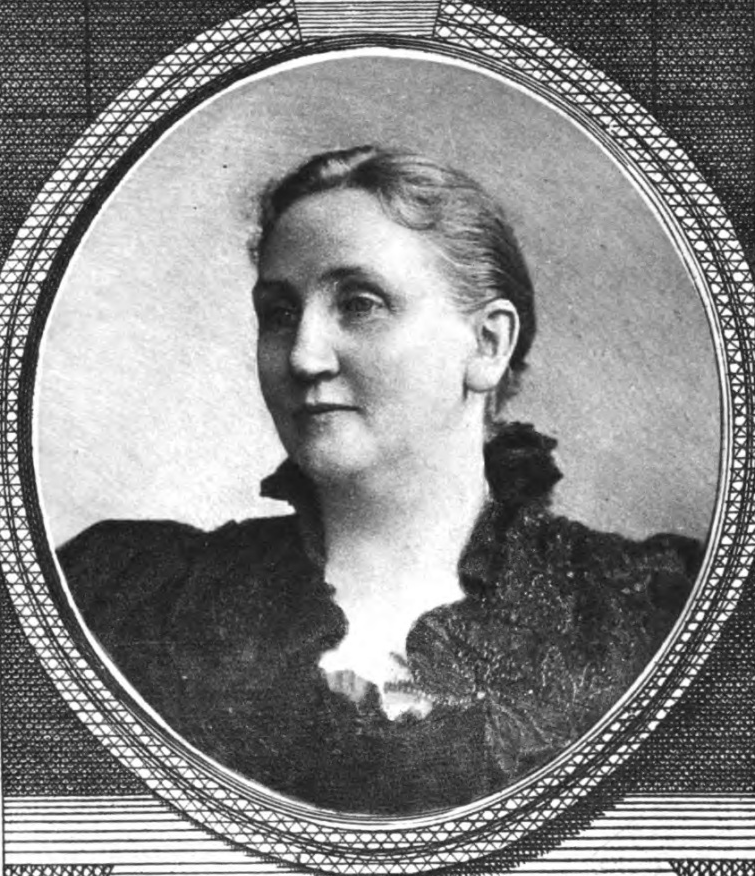
Rorer in 1898

In 1882, she founded the Philadelphia Cooking School where she offered cooking classes, a chemistry class, and classes on preparing proper meals for both the sick and healthy. Rorer was in charge of the Philadelphia Cooking School for 18 years and was able to reach 5,000 students through education during that time. In the course of her career, Mrs. Rorer gave many cooking exhibitions, some of them at the Pennsylvania Chautauqua. She was president of the women's auxiliary board of the Pennsylvania Chautauqua. Her most famous demonstrations were at the St. Louis World's Fair of 1904, where she was director and manager of the East and West pavilions.

Sarah Tyson Rorer was a newspaper columnist for magazines such as Table Talk Magazine, Household New, Ladies Home Journal, and Good House Keeping. She was editor and part-owner of Table Talk from 1886 to 1892, an editor of Household News from 1893 to 1897, and a member of the staff of the Ladies Home Journal until 1911, when Good Housekeeping secured her services. Sarah wrote and published 32 cookbooks under the pen name Sarah Tyson Heston Rorer. White housewives from the upper and middle classes made up the majority of Rorer's readers and students. She was a director of the Pennsylvania Chautauqua School of Domestic Science.

Rorer was not a vegetarian but she did author a successful vegetarian cookbook, Mrs. Rorer's Vegetable Cookery and Meat Substitute, which illustrated how to cook three meatless meals a day.

== Personal life ==
In 1871, she married William Albert Rorer, from whom she separated around 1896. They had three children. Two boys survived them. During the Great Depression, she depended on her sons and her students for financial support. She died at her home in Colebrook, Pennsylvania.

== Selected publications ==
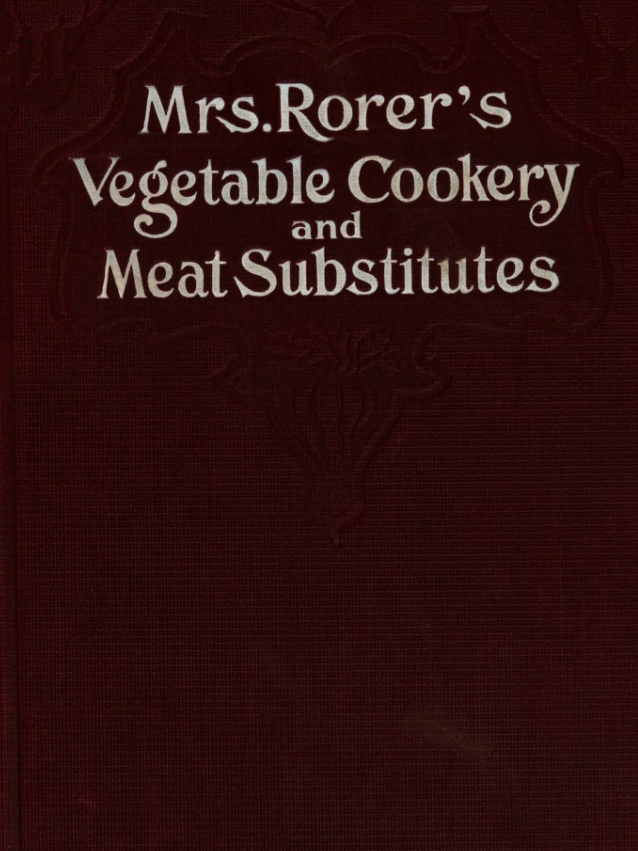
Mrs. Rorer's Vegetable Cookery and Meat Substitutes, 1909

Rorer published many books on cooking which became standard. Among her publications were:

- Philadelphia Cook Book (1886)
- Canning and Preserving. (1887)
- Hot Weather Dishes (1888)
- Home Candy Making (1889)
- How to Cook Vegetables (1891)
- Twenty Quick Soups (1894)
- Sandwiches (1894)
- New Salads for Dinners, Luncheons, Suppers and Receptions, with a Group of Odd Salads and some Ceylon Salads (1897)
- Made Over Dishes (1898)
- Mrs. Rorer's New Cook Book (1902)
- World’s Fair Souvenir Cook Book (1904)
- Mrs. Rorer's Every Day Menu Book (1905)
- Many Ways of Cooking Eggs (1907)
- My Best 250 Recipes (1907)
- Mrs. Rorer's Vegetable Cookery and Meat Substitutes (1909)
- Dainties (1912)
- Diet for the Sick (1914)
- How to Use a Chafing Dish
- Colonial Cookery
- A Book on Diet and Cookery

== Other ==
Emma Weigley completed doctoral studies in nutrition at New York University in 1971, with a thesis titled Sarah Tyson Rorer (1849-1937), a Biographical Study.
