= Frederick Huff Payne =

US Assistant Secretary of War (1876–1960)

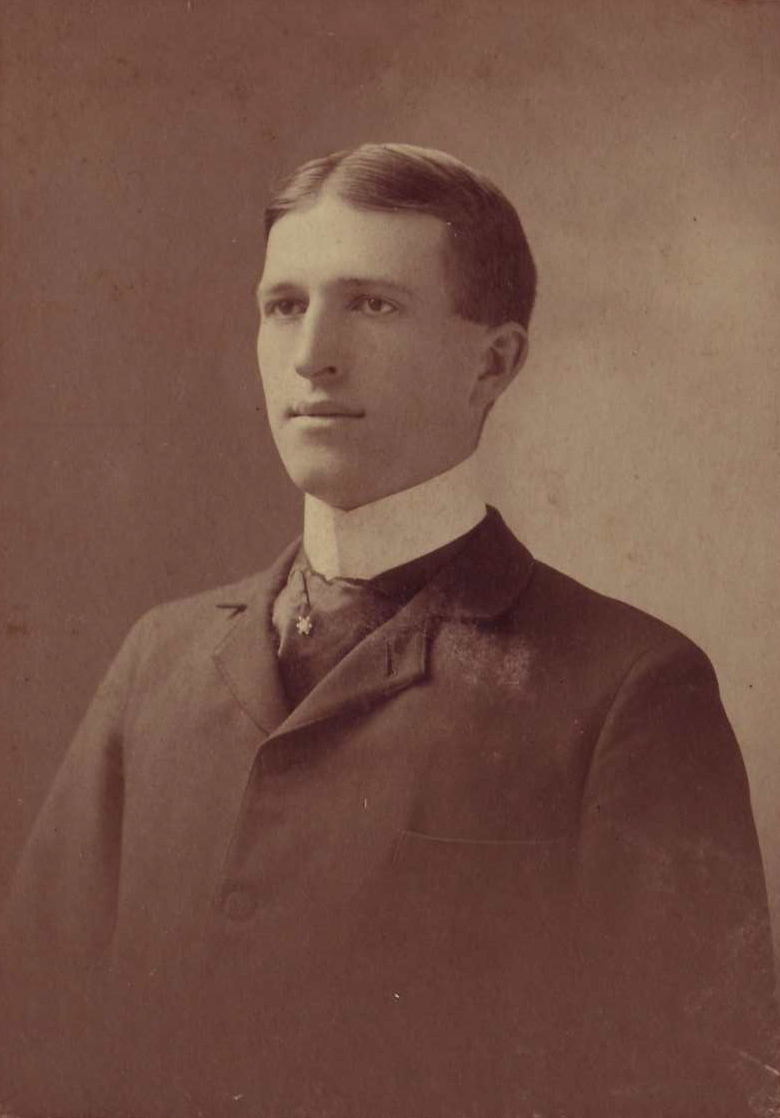
Frederick Huff Payne circa 1900-1910

Frederick Huff Payne (November 10, 1876 – March 24, 1960) was the United States Assistant Secretary of War from 1930 to 1933, under President Herbert Hoover.

== Biography ==
Payne was born on November 10, 1876, in Greenfield, Massachusetts, to Samuel Brewer Payne (1843-1912) and Eva Caroline Huff (1850-1917). He married Mary Blake (1878-1943) on November 8, 1900, in Parsons, Kansas. They had three children — Frederick Huff (1901-1989), Groverman Blake (1909-1963), and Carolyn Huff (1913-2001).

He was the United States Assistant Secretary of War from 1930 to 1933. He was promoted to a colonel in 1932. He died on March 24, 1960, in Greenfield, Massachusetts, at the home of his son, Groverman Payne. He was buried in Green River Cemetery in Greenfield, Massachusetts
