= Russell Weigley =

American historian

- Born: Russell Frank Weigley; July 2, 1930; Reading, Pennsylvania, U.S.
- Died: March 3, 2004 (aged 73); Philadelphia, Pennsylvania, U.S.
- Occupations: Professor, author, historian
- Spouse: Emma Seifrit
- Children: Jared, Catherine

Russell Frank Weigley (WY-glee) (July 2, 1930 – March 3, 2004) was the Distinguished University Professor of History at Temple University in Philadelphia, Pennsylvania, and a noted military historian. His research and teaching interests centered on American and world military history, World War II, and the American Civil War. One of Weigley's most widely received contributions to research is his hypothesis of a specifically American Way of War, i.e. an approach to strategy and military operations, that, while not predetermined, is distinct to the United States because of cultural and historical constraints.

== Education and career ==
Weigley was born in Reading, Pennsylvania, on July 2, 1930. He graduated from Albright College in 1952, attended the University of Pennsylvania for his master's degree and doctorate, and wrote his dissertation under Pulitzer Prize-winning historian, Roy F. Nichols. It was published as Quartermaster General of the Union Army: A Biography of M.C. Meigs (Columbia University Press, 1959). After receiving his degree, Weigley taught at Penn from 1956 to 1958, and from 1958 to 1962 at Drexel University. Then he joined the faculty at Temple as an associate professor and remained until his retirement in 1998 as Distinguished University Professor. The school considered him the heart and soul of the history department, and at one point he had over 30 PhD candidates working under him concurrently. He also was a visiting professor at Dartmouth College and the U.S. Army War College at Carlisle, Pennsylvania.

== Scholarship and ideas ==
Weigley's graduate teaching emphasized military history defined in a broadly comprehensive way, including operational, combat history but also extending to the larger issues of war and its significance; to the history of ideas about war, peace, and the armed forces; and to the place of the soldier in the state and in society.

== Honors and awards ==
Weigley was awarded a John Simon Guggenheim Memorial Foundation Fellowship, 1969–70. He received the Athenaeum Literary Award in 1983. In 1989, he was awarded the Samuel Eliot Morison Prize of the American Military Institute. In 1992, Age of Battles received the Distinguished Book Award given by the American Military Institute. He has served as president of the Historical Society of Pennsylvania and the American Military Institute. In recognition of his scholarly achievements, Weigley was named Distinguished University Professor at Temple in 1985. He was elected to the American Philosophical Society in 1993.

== Death ==
Weigley died in Philadelphia on March 3, 2004, of a heart attack. He was survived by his wife of 40 years, Emma Seifrit Weigley (1933–2020), his son Jared, and his daughter Catherine.

== Selected works ==
- Quartermaster General of the Union Army: A Biography of M.C. Meigs. Columbia University Press, 1959.
- Towards an American Army: Military Thought from Washington to Marshall (1962)
- History of the United States Army (1967)
- "The Partisan War: The South Carolina Campaign of 1780–1782. University of South Carolina Press, 1970.
- The American Way of War: A History of United States Military Strategy and Policy, Macmillan Publishing, New York (1973)
- New Dimensions in Military History: An Anthology Edited by Russell F. Weigley. San Rafael, CA: Presidio Press, (1975)
- "American Strategy from its Beginnings through the First World War." In Peter Paret, Ed. with Gordon A. Craig and Felix Gilbert, Makers of Modern Strategy from Machiavelli to the Nuclear Ages. Princeton University Press, 1986.
- Eisenhower's Lieutenants: The Campaign of France and Germany, 1944–1945 (1981)
- "The Origin and Prevention of Major Wars." The Journal of Military History (January 1990) with Robert I. Rotberg and Theodore K. Rabb.
- The Age of Battles: The Quest for Decisive Warfare from Breitenfeld to Waterloo (1991)
- "The Chairman: John J. McCloy, the Making of the American Establishment." Political Science Quarterly (January 1992) with Kai Bird.
- "The American Military and the Principle of Civilian Control From McClellan to Powell." The Journal of Military History (January 1993).
- A Great Civil War: A Military and Political History, 1861 – 1865 (2000)
- "Normandy and Falaise: A Critique of Allied Operational Planning in 1944", In Michael E. Krause, R. Cody Phillips, Eds. Historical Perspectives of the Operational Art. Washington, D.C.: Center of Military History, United States Army, 2007, 393-414.
- "Reflections on 'Lessons' from Vietnam", in Peter Braestrup, Ed. Vietnam as History: Ten Years after the Paris Accords. Washington, D.C.: University Press of America, 1984, 115–124.
