= List of COVID-19 deaths in North America =

This is a list of notable people reported as having died either from coronavirus disease 2019 (COVID-19) or post COVID-19 (long COVID), as a result of infection by the virus SARS-CoV-2 during the COVID-19 pandemic and post-COVID-19 pandemic in North America.

== Canada ==
Date	Image	Name	Age	Notes	Place of death
3 April 2020		Marguerite Lescop	104	Author	Canada (Montreal)
7 April 2020		Ghyslain Tremblay	68	Actor (Les Brillant)	Canada (Verdun)
8 April 2020		Robert L. Carroll	81	Paleontologist	Canada (Westmount)
9 April 2020		Ho Kam-ming	94	Martial artist	Canada (Toronto)
12 April 2020		Claude Beauchamp	80	Journalist	Canada (Montreal)
19 April 2020		Claude Lafortune	83	Artist and sculptor	Canada (Longueuil)
30 April 2020		Sylvie Vincent	79	Anthropologist	Canada (Montreal)
2 May 2020		Jim Henderson	79	Member of the Legislative Assembly of Ontario (1985–1995)	Canada (Toronto)
7 May 2020		Joyce Davidson	89	Journalist	Canada (Toronto)
12 May 2020		Renée Claude	80	Singer	Canada (Montreal)
15 May 2020		John Palmer	77	Film director and playwright	Canada (Ottawa)
18 May 2020		Craig Welch	71	Animator	Canada (Montreal)
19 July 2020		Margaret Waterchief	88	Priest	Canada (Strathmore)
24 November 2020		Fred Sasakamoose	86	Ice hockey player (Chicago Black Hawks)	Canada (Prince Albert)
25 November 2020		Marc-André Bédard	85	Member of the National Assembly of Quebec (1973–1985)	Canada (Saguenay)
1 December 2020		Sol Tolchinsky	91	Basketball player (Canada)	Canada (Montreal)
18 December 2020		Joan Dougherty	93	Member of the National Assembly of Quebec (1981–1987)	Canada (Westmount)
19 December 2020		Leo Panitch	75	Political scientist	Canada (Toronto)
9 January 2021		George Robertson	93	Ice hockey player (Montreal Canadiens)	Canada (Winnipeg)
12 January 2021		Shingoose	74	Singer	Canada (Winnipeg)
2 February 2021		Henry Tarvainen	76	Actor	Canada (Toronto)
15 February 2021		Eva Maria Pracht	83	Olympic equestrian (Bronze – 1988)	Canada
16 February 2021		Raymond Lévesque	92	Singer	Canada (Montreal)
24 February 2021		Sylvia Murphy	89	Singer	Canada (Mississauga)
15 April 2021		Clotilda Douglas-Yakimchuk	89	Nurse	Canada (Halifax)
18 April 2021		Michael Bedford-Jones	83	Bishop of Toronto (1994–2008)	Canada (Oshawa)
22 May 2021		Cornelia Oberlander	99	Architect	Canada (Vancouver)
14 October 2021		Peter Jenkins	77	Member of the Legislative Assembly of the Yukon (1995–2006)	Canada (Vancouver)
20 November 2021		Josée Forest-Niesing	56	Member of the Senate of Canada (since 2019)	Canada (Sudbury)
10 December 2021		Les Emmerson	77	Singer (Five Man Electrical Band)	Canada (Ottawa)
11 January 2022		Kay McNamee	91	Olympic swimmer	Canada (Richmond)
17 February 2022		Marc Hamilton	78	Singer	Canada (Saint-Jérôme)

== Cuba ==
Date	Image	Name	Age	Notes	Place of death
12 April 2020		Victor Batista Falla	87	Journalist	Cuba (Havana)
27 February 2021		Marta Martin Carrera-Ruiz	80	Actress	Cuba
12 May 2021		Higinio Vélez	74	Baseball manager (Cuba)	Cuba (Havana)
3 August 2021		Noel Guzmán Boffil Rojas	66	Painter	Cuba (Santa Clara)
28 August 2021		Giraldo González	63	Baseball player (Cuba)	Cuba
1 September 2021		Adalberto Álvarez	72	Pianist	Cuba (Havana)
3 September 2021		Enrique Molina	77	Actor	Cuba (Havana)
12 September 2021		Bernardino Cano Radil	65	Ambassador of Paraguay to Cuba (since 2015) and member of the Congress of Paraguay (1989–1998)	Cuba (Havana)

== Haiti ==
Date	Image	Name	Age	Notes	Place of death
8 June 2021		Sylvain Ducange	58	Bishop of Port-au-Prince (since 2016)	Haiti (Mirebalais)
23 June 2021		René Sylvestre	58	Chief Justice of the Supreme Court of Haiti (since 2019)	Haiti (Mirebalais)
17 November 2021		Gilbert Dragon	52	Police officer	Haiti

== Jamaica ==
Date	Image	Name	Age	Notes	Place of death
11 September 2020		Toots Hibbert	77	Singer (Toots and the Maytals)	Jamaica (Kingston)
17 September 2020		Donald Keith Duncan	80	Member of the Parliament of Jamaica (2007–2016 & 1976–1983)	Jamaica (Kingston)
27 February 2021		Erica Watson	48	Actress (Precious & Chi-Raq)	Jamaica (Montego Bay)
22 April 2021		Dennis Johnson	81	Olympic sprinter	Jamaica (Kingston)
11 August 2022		Marco Brown	94	Member of the Parliament of Jamaica (1980–1989)	Jamaica

== Mexico ==
Date	Image	Name	Age	Notes	Place of death
12 April 2020		Jaime Ruiz Sacristán	70	Chairman of the Mexican Stock Exchange (since 2015)	Mexico (Mexico City)
30 April 2020		Óscar Chávez	85	Singer-songwriter	Mexico (Mexico City)
13 May 2020		Yoshio	70	Singer	Mexico (Mexico City)
16 May 2020		Pilar Pellicer	82	Actress (Ariel Award for Best Actress – 1974)	Mexico (Mexico City)
8 June 2020		Manuel Felguérez	92	Painter	Mexico (Mexico City)
14 June 2020		Aarón Padilla Gutiérrez	77	Footballer (Mexico)	Mexico (Guadalajara)
8 June 2020		Reynaldo Salazar	65	Taekwondo athlete	Mexico (Mexico City)
12 July 2020		Raymundo Capetillo	76	Actor	Mexico (Mexico City)
24 July 2020		Claudio Zupo	35	Judoka	Mexico (Sonora)
30 August 2020		Cecilia Romo	74	Actress	Mexico (Mexico City)
15 September 2020		Miguel Acundo González	58	Member of the Chamber of Deputies (since 2018)	Mexico (Puebla)
28 September 2020		Rubén Anguiano	69	Footballer (Mexico)	Mexico
24 October 2020		Joel Molina Ramírez	77	Member of the Senate of Mexico (since 2019)	Mexico (Tlaxcala City)
31 October 2020		Arturo Lona Reyes	94	Bishop of Tehuantepec (1980–2001)	Mexico (Lagunas)
8 November 2020		Víctor Valencia de los Santos	61	Member of the Chamber of Deputies (2006–2009)	Mexico (Ciudad Juárez)
10 November 2020		Isidro Pedraza Chavez	61	Member of the Chamber of Deputies (2006–2015)	Mexico (Pachuca)
22 November 2020		Pedro Ávila Nevárez	83	Member of the Chamber of Deputies (2003–2012)	Mexico
24 November 2020		Juan de Dios Castro Lozano	78	Member of the Chamber of Deputies (1979–2004)	Mexico
25 November 2020		José Manuel Mireles Valverde	62	Doctor	Mexico (Morelia)
26 November 2020		Balfre Vargas Cortez	61	Member of the Chamber of Deputies (2009–2012)	Mexico (Mexico City)
14 December 2020		José María de la Torre Martín	68	Bishop of Aguascalientes (since 2008)	Mexico (Aguascalientes City)
20 December 2020		Delfino López Aparicio	60	Member of the Chamber of Deputies (since 2018)	Mexico
20 December 2020		Florencio Olvera Ochoa	87	Bishop of Cuernavaca (2002–2009)	Mexico
21 December 2020		Gilberto Ensástiga	57	Member of the Chamber of Deputies (2003–2006)	Mexico
23 December 2020		Benedicto Bravo	58	Footballer (Club León)	Mexico (León)
24 December 2020		Armando Romero	60	Footballer (Mexico)	Mexico
27 December 2020		Alberto Amador Leal	69	Member of the Chamber of Deputies (2000–2009)	Mexico
27 December 2020		Florentino Domínguez Ordóñez	58	Member of the Chamber of Deputies (2003–2006)	Mexico
28 December 2020		Othón Cuevas Córdova	55	Member of the Chamber of Deputies (2006–2009)	Mexico
28 December 2020		Luis Enrique Mercado	68	Member of the Chamber of Deputies (2009–2012)	Mexico (Mexico City)
28 December 2020		Armando Manzanero	85	Singer (Grammy Lifetime Achievement Award – 2014 & Latin Grammy Lifetime Achievement Award – 2010)	Mexico (Mexico City)
29 December 2020		Miguel Ángel Gutiérrez Machado	60	Member of the Chamber of Deputies (2000–2003)	Mexico
8 January 2021		Marissa Garrido	94	Actress	Mexico (Mexico City)
14 January 2021		Carlos Armando Biebrich	81	Member of the Chamber of Deputies (2006–2009 & 1967–1970) and Governor of Sonora (1973–1975)	Mexico (Hermosillo)
18 January 2021		Francisco Daniel Rivera Sánchez	66	Bishop Mexico City (since 2020)	Mexico (Mexico City)
19 January 2021		Gustavo Peña	78	Footballer (Mexico)	Mexico (Mexico City)
22 January 2021		Martha Madrigal	91	Poet	Mexico
25 January 2021		Avelino Méndez Rangel	62	Member of the Chamber of Deputies (2015–2018 & 2009–2012)	Mexico (Mexico City)
28 January 2021		Rafael Navarro-Gonzalez	61	Astrobiologist	Mexico
7 February 2021		Ricardo Silva Elizondo	67	Actor	Mexico (Mexico City)
8 February 2021		Beatriz Yamamoto Cázarez	63	Member of the Chamber of Deputies (2012–2015)	Mexico (León)
15 February 2021		Lucía Guilmáin	78	Actress	Mexico (Mexico City)
17 February 2021		Sanjaya Rajaram	77–78	Scientist	Mexico (Ciudad Obregón)
21 February 2021		Radamés Salazar	46	Member of the Senate of Mexico (since 2018)	Mexico (Mexico City)
21 March 2021		Alberto Ciurana	60	Television producer	Mexico (Mexico City)
21 March 2021		Hermenegildo Ramírez Sánchez	92	Bishop of Santa Giusta (1975–2005)	Mexico (Querétaro City)
4 April 2021		Francisco Haghenbeck	56	Writer	Mexico (Tehuacán)
29 April 2021		José Francisco Gallardo Rodríguez	75	Military officer	Mexico (Mexico City)
26 July 2021		Rene Juarez Cisneros	65	Member of the Chamber of Deputies (Since 2018 & 1994–1997), Senate of Mexico (2012–2016) and Governor of Guerrero (1999–2005)	Mexico (Mexico City)
30 July 2021		Martha Sánchez Néstor	49	Activist	Mexico
3 August 2021		María Teresa Marú Mejía	62	Member of the Chamber of Deputies (since 2018)	Mexico (Mexico City)
4 August 2021		Zelá Brambillé	27	Writer	Mexico (Saltillo)
31 August 2021		Francisco Monterrosa	53	Artist	Mexico
8 September 2021		Juan Guillermo López Soto	74	Bishop of Cuauhtémoc-Madera (since 1995)	Mexico (Chihuahua City)
15 September 2021		Fernando Mario Chávez Ruvalcaba	89	Bishop of Zacatecas (1999–2008)	Mexico (Zacatecas City)
31 January 2022		Onésimo Cepeda Silva	84	Bishop of Ecatepec (1995–2012)	Mexico
3 February 2022		Francisco Raúl Villalobos Padilla	84	Bishop of Saltillo (1975–1999)	Mexico (Saltillo)
9 February 2022		Super Muñeco	69	Professional wrestler	Mexico (Mexico City)
22 February 2022		José Isidro Guerrero Macías	70	Bishop of Mexicali (since 1997)	Mexico (Mexicali)
2 March 2022		Israel Beltrán Montes	74	Member of the Chamber of Deputies (2006–2009 & 1991–2002)	Mexico (Chihuahua City)
14 March 2022		Francisco Solís Peón	53	Member of the Legislative Assembly of Mexico City (2000–2003)	Mexico (Mérida)

== United States ==
=== Alabama ===
Date	Image	Name	Age	Notes	Place of death
17 April 2020		Bennie G. Adkins	86	Military officer (Medal of Honor recipient)	Alabama (Opelika)
5 May 2020		Brian Axsmith	57	Paleobotanist	Alabama (Mobile)
14 July 2020		Pamela Rush	49	Civil rights activist	Alabama (Selma)
9 September 2020		Henrietta Boggs	102	First Lady of Costa Rica (1953–1954 & 1948–1949)	Alabama (Montgomery)
4 December 2020		Larry Dixon	78	Member of the Alabama Senate (1983–2011)	Alabama (Montgomery)
14 December 2020		Jack Page	70	Member of the Alabama House of Representatives (1993–2011)	Alabama (Gadsden)
10 February 2021		Taavo Virkhaus	86	Conductor and composer	Alabama (Huntsville)
25 March 2021		Randy Tate	68	Baseball player (New York Mets)	Alabama (Muscle Shoals)
16 August 2021		Lucille Times	100	Civil rights activist	Alabama (Montgomery)
9 February 2022		Rudy Abbott	81	College baseball coach (Jacksonville State Gamecocks)	Alabama (Jacksonville)

=== Alaska ===
Date	Image	Name	Age	Notes	Place of death
27 February 2021		Mike Bradner	83	Speaker of the Alaska House of Representatives (1975–1977) and member of the Alaska House of Representatives (1967–1977)	Alaska (Anchorage)
3 February 2022		Martin B. Moore	84	Member of the Alaska House of Representatives (1971–1973)	Alaska (Bethel)

=== Arizona ===
Date	Image	Name	Age	Notes	Place of death
14 May 2020		Sally Rowley	88	Civil rights activist	Arizona (Tucson)
2 August 2020		Tootie Robbins	62	American football player (Arizona Cardinals)	Arizona (Chandler)
15 December 2020		Anthony Casso	78	Mobster	Arizona (Tucson)
2 February 2021		Albert Hale	70	Member of the Arizona House of Representatives (2011–2017) and member of the Arizona Senate (2004–2011)	Arizona (Mesa)
6 February 2021		Claudette White	49	Judge of the San Manuel Band of Mission Indians (2018–2020) and Quechan Tribal Indian Court (2006–2020)	Arizona (Yuma)
7 October 2021		Reggie Parks	87	Wrestler	Arizona (Tucson)
19 November 2021		Ricky Nelson	62	Baseball player (Seattle Mariners)	Arizona (Phoenix)
22 November 2021		Doug Jones	64	Baseball player (Cleveland Indians – All-Star champion – 1988–1990, 1992 & 1994)	Arizona (Tucson)
14 February 2022		Nancy Lord	70	Attorney	Arizona (Show Low)
9 August 2022		Donald Machholz	69	Astronomer	Arizona (Wikieup)
15 October 2022		Sylvia Laughter	63	Member of the Arizona House of Representatives (1999–2005)	Arizona (Mesa)
6 January 2023		Lew Hunter	87	Screenwriter and educator	Arizona (Tucson)

=== California ===
Date	Image	Name	Age	Notes	Place of death
31 March 2020		Julie Bennett	88	Actress (The Yogi Bear Show & Spider-Man)	California (Los Angeles)
7 April 2020		Allen Garfield	80	Actor (The Ninth Gate)	California (Woodland Hills)
13 April 2020		Ann Sullivan	91	Animator (The Little Mermaid,The Lion King & Pocahontas)	California (Woodland Hills)
15 April 2020		Allen Daviau	77	Cinematographer (BAFTA Award for Best Cinematography – 1987)	California (Los Angeles)
21 April 2020		Donald Kennedy	88	Commissioner of Food and Drugs (1977–1979) and President of Stanford University (1979–1992)	California (Redwood City)
21 April 2020		Joel Rogosin	88	Television director (Magnum, P.I. & Ironside)	California (San Diego)
17 June 2020		Trần Ngọc Châu	96	Military officer	California (Los Feliz)
3 July 2020		Manuel Machado Alvarez	59	Convicted murderer	California (San Quentin)
3 July 2020		Scott Erskine	57	Convicted murderer	California (San Quentin)
4 July 2020		Brandis Kemp	76	Actress (AfterMASH)	California (Los Feliz)
5 July 2020		Nick Cordero	41	Actor (Blue Bloods)	California (Los Angeles)
11 August 2020		Trini Lopez	83	Singer	California (Palm Springs)
31 August 2020		Tom Seaver	75	Baseball player (New York Mets – All-Star champion – 1967–1973, 1975–1978, & 1981 and World Series champion – 1969)	California (Calistoga)
23 September 2020		Charles Stuart Bowyer	86	Astronomer	California (Orinda)
26 September 2020		Jay Johnstone	74	Baseball player (Los Angeles Dodgers – World Series champion – 1978 & 1981)	California (Granada Hills)
30 October 2020		Rick Baldwin	67	Baseball player (New York Mets)	California (Modesto)
1 December 2020		Arnie Robinson	72	Olympic long jumper (Gold – 1976 & Bronze – 1972)	California (San Diego)
8 December 2020		Harold Budd	84	Composer	California (Arcadia)
8 December 2020		Tony Curcillo	89	American football player (Chicago Cardinals)	California (Riverside)
13 December 2020		Rose Ochi	81	Lawyer and activist	California (Los Angeles)
17 December 2020		Kim Chernin	80	Feminist Writer	California (Point Reyes Station)
20 December 2020		Julius Schachter	84	Microbiologist	California (San Francisco)
21 December 2020		Mark Appelbaum	79	Psychologist	California (San Diego)
22 December 2020		Leo Goodman	92	Statistician	California (Berkeley)
26 December 2020		Theodore Lumpkin	100	Military officer	California (Los Angeles)
28 December 2020		John R. Bentson	83	Doctor	California (Los Angeles)
28 December 2020		Arianna W. Rosenbluth	93	Physicist	California (Pasadena)
30 December 2020		Dawn Wells	82	Actress (Gilligan's Island)	California (Los Angeles)
1 January 2021		George Whitmore	89	Mountain climber	California (Fresno)
3 January 2021		Donald Perry Polsky	92	Architect	California (Berkeley)
8 January 2021		Steve Carver	75	Film director (Lone Wolf McQuade)	California (Los Angeles)
10 January 2021		Antonio Sabàto Sr.	77	Actor (One Dollar Too Many)	California (Hemet)
14 January 2021		Dale Rogers Marshall	83	President of Wheaton College (1992–2004)	California (Berkeley)
15 January 2021		Lệ Thu	88	Singer	California (Fountain Valley)
16 January 2021		Phil Spector	81	Convicted murderer and record producer (Grammy Award for Album of the Year – 1973)	California (French Camp)
17 January 2021		Gerald Locklin	79	Poet	California
19 January 2021		Lâm Quang Thi	88	Military officer	California (Fremont)
20 January 2021		Harold Widom	88	Mathematician	California (Santa Cruz)
23 January 2021		Anita R. Schiller	94	Librarian	California (San Diego)
24 January 2021		Sonny Fox	95	Television host (Wonderama)	California (Encino)
27 January 2021		Goddess Bunny	61	Drag Queen	California (Los Angeles)
28 January 2021		Cloris Leachman	94	Actress (Academy Award for Best Supporting Actress – 1974, Golden Globe for Best Actress – 1975 & 8x Emmy Award winner)	California (Encinitas)
30 January 2021		Marc Wilmore	57	Television writer (The Simpsons & F Is for Family)	California (Pomona)
1 February 2021		Chuck Kaye	80	Music industry executive	California (Santa Barbara)
4 February 2021		Hy Cohen	90	Baseball player (Chicago Cubs)	California (Rancho Mirage)
5 February 2021		Julio Canani	82	Horse trainer	California (Pasadena)
8 February 2021		Claude Crabb	80	American football player (Los Angeles Rams)	California (Palm Desert)
12 February 2021		Frederick K. C. Price	89	Author and pastor	California (Torrance)
14 February 2021		Berta Berkovich Kohút	99	Holocaust survivor	California (San Rafael)
21 February 2021		Judy Irola	77	Cinematographer	California (Los Angeles)
26 February 2021		Gabriel Zavala	76	Mariachi musician and teacher	California (Anaheim)
21 April 2021		Johnny Crawford	75	Actor (The Rifleman)	California (Los Angeles)
29 July 2021		Zizinho	59	Soccer player (León)	California (Los Angeles)
31 July 2021		Alvin Ing	89	Actor (The Gambler)	California (Burbank)
9 August 2021		Chucky Thompson	53	Record producer	California (Los Angeles)
20 September 2021		Colin Bailey	87	Drummer	California (Port Hueneme)
12 October 2021		Ricarlo Flanagan	41	Actor (Shameless) and comedian	California (Los Angeles)
20 October 2021		Dave Harper	55	American and Canadian football player	California (Templeton)
7 December 2021		Joe Hernandez	81	American football player (Washington Redskins)	California (Bakersfield)
7 January 2022		R. Dean Taylor	78	Musician and singer	California (Los Angeles)
10 January 2022		Robert Durst	78	Convicted murderer and real estate heir	California (Stockton)
17 January 2022		Bill Jackson	86	Actor	California (Paso Robles)
18 January 2022		Freddie Hughes	78	Singer	California (Oakland)
22 January 2022		Mel Mermelstein	95	Holocaust survivor	California (Long Beach)
27 January 2022		Diego Verdaguer	70	Singer	California (Los Angeles)
11 February 2022		Knightowl	55	Rap artist	California (San Diego)
23 February 2022		Joeli Vidiri	48	Rugby union player (New Zealand)	California (Sacramento)
1 May 2022		Charles Siebert	84	Actor (Trapper John, M.D.) and director	California (Santa Rosa)
4 May 2022		Howie Pyro	61	Musician	California (Los Angeles)
13 July 2022		Michael James Jackson	77	Record producer	California (Los Angeles)
23 July 2022		Sid Jacobson	92	Comic book writer	California (San Mateo)
7 August 2022		Bert Fields	93	Lawyer	California (Malibu)
13 October 2022		Doug Brignole	62	Bodybuilder	California
11 January 2023		Ben Masters	75	Actor (Passions)	California (Palm Springs)
28 April 2024		Zack Norman	83	Actor, comedian, film producer, and art collector	California (Burbank)
30 August 2024		George Berci	103	Surgeon	California (Los Angeles)
6 September 2024		Sérgio Mendes	83	Musician	California (Los Angeles)

=== Colorado ===
Date	Image	Name	Age	Notes	Place of death
25 March 2020		Freddy Rodriguez	89	Saxophonist and composer	Colorado (Denver)
18 April 2020		Bob Lazier	81	Racing car driver	Colorado (Denver)
21 April 2020		Jack Taylor	84	Member of the Colorado Senate (2000–2008) and member of the Colorado House of Representatives (1992–2000)	Colorado (Steamboat Springs)
16 November 2020		Joe Núñez	84	Member of the Colorado House of Representatives (1998–2002)	Colorado
10 December 2020		Rita Martinez	65	Chicana activist	Colorado (Pueblo)
28 January 2021		Walter Plywaski	91	Holocaust survivor	Colorado (Boulder)
12 September 2021		Bob Enyart	62	COVID-19 skeptic, pastor and radio host	Colorado (Denver)

=== Connecticut ===
Date	Image	Name	Age	Notes	Place of death
23 March 2020		Mary Roman	84	Olympics athlete and community leader	Connecticut (Norwalk)
1 April 2020		Kevin Duffy	87	Judge of the United States District Court for the Southern District of New York (1972–2016)	Connecticut (Greenwich)
7 April 2020		Henry Graff	98	Historian	Connecticut (Greenwich)
19 April 2020		Steve Dalkowski	80	Baseball player (Aberdeen Pheasants)	Connecticut (New Britain)
27 May 2020		Evelyn Nicol	89	Immunologist and microbiologist	Connecticut (Weston)
27 May 2020		Nicholas Rinaldi	86	Poet and novelist	Connecticut (Bridgeport)
10 January 2021		Dee Rowe	91	Basketball coach (Connecticut)	Connecticut (Storrs)
17 January 2021		Robert Cheezic	82	Tang Soo Do practitioner	Connecticut (Wolcott)
26 February 2021		Bill C. Davis	69	Playwright and actor	Connecticut (Torrington)
29 November 2021		Robert Farris Thompson	88	Art historian	Connecticut (New Haven)
14 January 2022		Ann Arensberg	84	Book publishing editor and author	Connecticut (Sharon)

=== Delaware ===
Date	Image	Name	Age	Notes	Place of death
7 May 2020		E. Wayne Craven	89	Art historian	Delaware (Newark)
18 January 2022		Badal Roy	82	Musician	Delaware (Wilmington)

=== Florida ===
Date	Image	Name	Age	Notes	Place of death
23 March 2020		Carole Brookins	76	Executive Director of the World Bank (2001–2006)	Florida (Palm Beach)
24 March 2020		Terrence McNally	81	Playwright and librettist (Tony Award winner – 1993, 1995, 1996 & 1998 & Emmy Award winner – 1990)	Florida (Sarasota)
27 April 2020		Troy Sneed	52	Gospel singer	Florida (Jacksonville)
28 May 2020		Eddie Mosley	73	Convicted murderer and rapist	Florida (Marianna)
4 July 2020		Bhakti Charu Swami	74	Spiritual leader	Florida
8 July 2020		Howard Schoenfield	62	Tennis player	Florida (South Beach)
18 July 2020		Katherine B. Hoffman	105	Chemist	Florida (Tallahassee)
25 July 2020		Helen Jones Woods	96	Trombonist	Florida (Sarasota)
26 July 2020		Dobby Dobson	78	Singer and record producer	Florida (Coral Springs)
7 August 2020		Nina Popova	97	Ballet dancer	Florida (St. Augustine)
8 August 2020		Bernard Fils-Aimé	67	Businessman	Florida (Miami)
21 August 2020		Ulric Haynes	89	Ambassador of the United States to Algeria (1977–1981)	Florida
29 November 2020		Ben Bova	89	Writer (6x Hugo Award winner)	Florida (Naples)
22 December 2020		Bonnie Ladwig	81	Member of the Wisconsin State Assembly (1993–2005)	Florida (Lake Placid)
12 January 2021		Bruce Bennett	77	Canadian football player (Saskatchewan Roughriders)	Florida (Ocala)
12 January 2021		Fred Levin	83	Lawyer	Florida (Pensacola)
15 January 2021		Geoff Barnett	74	Soccer player (Arsenal)	Florida (Fort Myers)
16 January 2021		Jerry Brandt	82	Businessman	Florida (Miami Beach)
16 January 2021		Little Walter DeVenne	73	Radio personality	Florida (Brooksville)
28 January 2021		Bachir Skiredj	82	Actor and comedian	Florida (Orlando)
31 January 2021		Zoila Águila Almeida	82	Revolutionary	Florida (Hialeah)
4 February 2021		Jaime Murrell	71	Christian music composer	Florida (Miami)
10 April 2021		Tulio Manuel Chirivella Varela	88	Archbishop of Barquisimeto (1982–2007)	Florida (Miami)
4 August 2021		Dick Farrel	65	COVID-19 skeptic and radio personality	Florida (West Palm Beach)
29 August 2021		Robert David Steele	69	COVID-19 skeptic and CIA officer	Florida
30 August 2021		Maggie Mae	61	Singer	Florida (Melbourne)
2 September 2021		Steve Lawler	56	Wrestler	Florida
14 September 2021		Dave Jenks	78	Author	Florida
17 December 2021		Doug Ericksen	52	Member of the Washington State Senate (since 2011) and member of the Washington House of Representatives (1999–2011)	Florida (Fort Lauderdale)
13 January 2022		Cholly Naranjo	87	Baseball player (Pittsburgh Pirates)	Florida (Miami)
18 January 2022		Hilario Candela	87	Architect	Florida (Coral Gables)
18 January 2022		Elio Pietrini	83	Actor (Nora & El árbol de Gabriel)	Florida (Miami)
21 January 2022		Dennis Smith	81	Author and firefighter	Florida (Venice)
14 February 2022		Mickie Henson	59	Wrestling referee	Florida (Key West)
26 August 2022		William A. Jenkins	104	Superintendent of the United States Coast Guard Academy (1974–1977)	Florida (St. Lucie County)
10 April 2024		Frank Olson	91	Business executive	Florida (Palm Beach)
8 October 2024		Donnie Marshall	92	Ice hockey player (Montreal Canadiens)	Florida (Stuart)

=== Georgia ===
Date	Image	Name	Age	Notes	Place of death
2 May 2020		Jim Cross	82	Ice hockey coach (Vermont)	Georgia (Savannah)
30 July 2020		Herman Cain	74	Chair of the Federal Reserve Bank of Kansas City (1995–1996) and 2012 Republican presidential candidate	Georgia (Stockbridge)
22 November 2020		George Nock	74	American football player (New York Jets)	Georgia (Snelville)
26 November 2020		George H. Carley	82	Chief Justice of the Supreme Court of Georgia (2012) and Associate Justice of the Supreme Court of Georgia (1993–2012)	Georgia (Atlanta)
14 December 2020		Richard Laird	81	Member of the Alabama House of Representatives (1978–2014)	Georgia (Carrollton)
12 January 2021		Tim Lester	52	American football player (Pittsburgh Steelers)	Georgia (Milton)
26 January 2021		Paul Varelans	51	Martial artist	Georgia (Atlanta)
26 January 2021		Sekou Smith	48	Sportswriter	Georgia (Marietta)
19 May 2021		David Anthony Kraft	68	Comic book writer	Georgia (Gainesville)
9 August 2021		Craig Ogletree	53	American football player (Cincinnati Bengals)	Georgia
6 April 2023		Kent C. Nelson	85	Chairman of the United Parcel Service (1989–1996)	Georgia (Atlanta)

=== Hawaii ===
Date	Image	Name	Age	Notes	Place of death
2 April 2020		Arthur Whistler	75	Ethnobotanist	Hawaii (Honolulu)
20 October 2021		Michael Laughlin	82	Film director (Town & Country)	Hawaii (Honolulu)

=== Idaho ===
Date	Image	Name	Age	Notes	Place of death
23 November 2021		Janet Campbell Hale	75	Writer (American Book Awards winner – 1989)	Idaho (Coeur d'Alene)
4 February 2022		Leland Christensen	62	Member of the Wyoming Senate (2011–2019)	Idaho (Idaho Falls)
3 May 2024		Dick Rutan	85	Aviator	Idaho (Coeur d'Alene)

=== Illinois ===
Date	Image	Name	Age	Notes	Place of death
4 April 2020		Rhoda Hatch	73	Anti-war activist and public school educator	Illinois (Chicago)
28 April 2020		David Boe	84	Organist	Illinois (Glenview)
13 May 2020		Riad Ismat	72	Minister of Culture of Syria (2010–2012)	Illinois (Evanston)
22 May 2020		Hecky Powell	72	Businessman	Illinois
22 May 2020		Conrad Worrill	72	Writer	Illinois (Chicago)
7 July 2020		Lynika Strozier	35	Scientist and researcher	Illinois (Chicago)
28 July 2020		Bill Montgomery	80	Conservative activist (Founder of Turning Point USA)	Illinois
17 August 2020		Chaim Dov Keller	90	Rabbi	Illinois
28 October 2020		Jan Krawiec	101	Journalist	Illinois
4 November 2020		John Meyer	78	American football coach (Green Bay Packers)	Illinois (Chicago)
4 November 2020		Roald Tweet	87	Academic	Illinois (Peoria)
29 November 2020		Nelly Sfeir Gonzalez	90	Librarian and bibliographer	Illinois (Urbana)
4 December 2020		Peter DiFronzo	87	Mobster	Illinois (South Barrington)
5 December 2020		Martin Sandoval	72	Member of the Illinois Senate (2003–2020)	Illinois (Chicago)
7 December 2020		Phyllis Eisenstein	74	Writer	Illinois (Chicago)
18 December 2020		Eddie Lee Jackson	71	Member of the Illinois House of Representatives (2009–2017)	Illinois (East St. Louis)
4 August 2021		Paul Johnson	50	House DJ	Illinois (Evergreen Park)

=== Indiana ===
Date	Image	Name	Age	Notes	Place of death
13 April 2020		Dennis G. Peters	82	Chemist	Indiana (Bloomington)
16 September 2020		Nick Mourouzis	83	American football coach (DePauw)	Indiana (Greencastle)
14 November 2020		Frederick B. Chary	81	Historian	Indiana (Porter County)
20 December 2020		Susan Moore	52	Doctor	Indiana (Carmel)
30 December 2020		Aldo Andretti	80	Racing car driver	Indiana (Indianapolis)

=== Iowa ===
Date	Image	Name	Age	Notes	Place of death
27 November 2020		Gene Fraise	88	Member of the Iowa Senate (1986–2013)	Iowa (West Burlington)
14 August 2022		James Riordan	72	Member of the Iowa Senate (1985–1995)	Iowa

=== Kansas ===
Date	Image	Name	Age	Notes	Place of death
28 November 2020		Tyler C. Lockett	87	Justice of the Kansas Supreme Court (1983–2003)	Kansas (Topeka)

=== Kentucky ===
Date	Image	Name	Age	Notes	Place of death
20 August 2021		Brent Yonts	72	Member of the Kentucky House of Representatives (1997–2016)	Kentucky (Owensboro)
8 December 2021		Mark Pike	57	American football player (Buffalo Bills)	Kentucky
22 November 2022		John Y. Brown Jr.	88	Governor of Kentucky (1979–1983)	Kentucky (Lexington)

=== Louisiana ===
Date	Image	Name	Age	Notes	Place of death
28 March 2020		April Dunn	33	Disability rights activist	Louisiana (Baton Rouge)
28 March 2020		Ellis Marsalis Jr.	85	Pianist	Louisiana (New Orleans)
4 April 2020		Tom Dempsey	73	American football player (New Orleans Saints – Pro Bowl champion – 1969)	Louisiana (New Orleans)
9 April 2020		Reggie Bagala	54	Member of the Louisiana House of Representatives (since 2020)	Louisiana (Raceland)
25 July 2020		Steve dePyssler	101	Military officer	Louisiana (Bossier City)
26 July 2020		Frank Howard	81	Member of the Louisiana House of Representatives (2008–2020)	Louisiana (Alexandria)
10 December 2020		Carol Sutton	76	Actress (Steel Magnolias & Monster's Ball)	Louisiana (New Orleans)
26 December 2020		Vic Stelly	79	Member of the Louisiana House of Representatives (1988–2004)	Louisiana (Lake Charles)
29 December 2020		Luke Letlow	41	Member-elect of the United States House of Representatives (since 2020)	Louisiana (Shreveport)
26 January 2021		Stephen Carter	77	Member of the Louisiana House of Representatives (2008–2020)	Louisiana (Baton Rouge)
5 March 2021		Mo Pinel	78	Mechanical engineer	Louisiana (Baton Rouge)
1 September 2021		Carol Fran	87	Singer	Louisiana (Lafayette)
4 August 2022		Albert Woodfox	75	Activist and author	Louisiana (New Orleans)

=== Maine ===
Date	Image	Name	Age	Notes	Place of death
2 May 2020		Ralph McGehee	92	Intelligence officer	Maine (Falmouth)
7 February 2021		J. Hillis Miller	92	Literary critic and scholar	Maine (Sedgwick)

=== Maryland ===
Date	Image	Name	Age	Notes	Place of death
1 April 2020		Richard Passman	94	Engineer	Maryland (Silver Spring)
30 April 2020		Alyce Chenault Gullattee	91	Doctor and activist	Maryland (Rockville)
30 April 2020		Yu Lihua	90	Writer	Maryland (Gaithersburg)
2 May 2020		John Paul Eberhard	93	Research architect and academic	Maryland (Gaithersburg)
3 May 2020		Roy Lester	96	American football coach (Magruder)	Maryland (Rockville)
25 May 2020		Mary J. Wilson	83	Zookeeper	Maryland (Randallstown)
1 July 2020		Edward A. Burkhalter	91	Director of Strategic Operations for the Chairman of the Joint Chiefs of Staff (1984–1987)	Maryland (Annapolis)
16 July 2020		Patrick Ellis	77	Radio host	Maryland (Annapolis)
22 November 2020		Jerrold Post	86	Psychiatrist	Maryland (Bethesda)
18 January 2021		Winfield Parker	78	Soul and gospel singer-songwriter	Maryland (Howard County)
9 February 2021		Peter C. Clapman	94	Banker	Maryland (Bethesda)
10 February 2021		Mack Walker	91	Historian	Maryland
8 April 2021		Alan Pastrana	76	American football player (Denver Broncos)	Maryland (Annapolis)
18 October 2021		Colin Powell	84	United States Secretary of State (2001–2005) and Chairman of the Joint Chiefs of Staff (1989–1993)	Maryland (Bethesda)
11 October 2022		Herbert Chabot	91	Judge of the United States Tax Court (1978–2016)	Maryland (Aspen Hill)

=== Massachusetts ===
Date	Image	Name	Age	Notes	Place of death
27 March 2020		Michael McKinnell	84	Architect	Massachusetts (Rockport)
30 March 2020		Ted Monette	75	Military officer	Massachusetts (Holyoke)
10 April 2020		David Cohen	102	Military officer	Massachusetts (Longmeadow)
13 April 2020		Thomas Kunz	82	Biologist	Massachusetts (Dedham)
24 April 2020		Burton Rose	77	Doctor	Massachusetts (Wellesley)
26 April 2020		Emilio Allué	92	Bishop of Boston (1996–2010)	Massachusetts (Boston)
2 May 2020		Daniel S. Kemp	84	Chemist	Massachusetts
10 May 2020		Georgia Litwack	98	Photographer	Massachusetts (Auburndale)
6 June 2020		Dietmar Seyferth	91	Chemist	Massachusetts
27 August 2020		James E. Humphreys	80	Mathematician	Massachusetts (Leeds)
10 January 2021		Nancy Walker Bush Ellis	94	Environmentalist	Massachusetts (Concord)
21 May 2021		Richard R. Lavigne	80	Laicized priest and convicted sex offender	Massachusetts (Greenfield)
22 January 2022		Bill Owens	84	Member of the Massachusetts Senate (1988–1992 & 1974–1982)	Massachusetts (Boston)
5 February 2022		Todd Gitlin	79	Sociologist	Massachusetts (Pittsfield)
23 March 2023		Israel Zelitch	98	Plant pathologist and ecologist	Massachusetts (Haverhill)

=== Michigan ===
Date	Image	Name	Age	Notes	Place of death
29 March 2020		Isaac Robinson	44	Member of the Michigan House of Representatives (since 2019)	Michigan (Detroit)
31 March 2020		Hedgemon Lewis	75	Boxer	Michigan (Detroit)
24 April 2020		Mike Huckaby	54	DJ	Michigan (Detroit)
4 May 2020		Motoko Fujishiro Huthwaite	92	Teacher	Michigan (Taylor)
11 May 2020		Morris Hood III	54	Member of the Michigan Senate (2011–2019) and member of the Michigan House of Representatives (2003–2009)	Michigan (Detroit)
21 June 2020		Ken Snow	50	Soccer Player (United States)	Michigan (Port Huron)
21 October 2020		Peter Secchia	83	United States Ambassador to Italy (1989–1993)	Michigan (East Grand Rapids)
5 November 2020		Gordon Van Wylen	100	Physicist	Michigan (Holland)
22 November 2020		Honestie Hodges	14	Civil rights activist	Michigan (Grand Rapids)
8 December 2020		Gladys Beckwith	91	Women's rights activist	Michigan (Lansing)
13 December 2020		Sal Rocca	74	Member of the Michigan House of Representatives (2001–2005 & 1975–1995)	Michigan (Troy)
17 December 2020		Benny Napoleon	65	Sheriff of Wayne County, Michigan (since 2009)	Michigan (Detroit)
18 December 2020		Bill Bullard Jr.	77	Member of the Michigan Senate (2003–2011) and Michigan House of Representatives (1995–2003)	Michigan (Commerce Township)
29 December 2020		Daniel S. Paletko	70	Mayor of Dearborn Heights (since 2004) and member of the Michigan House of Representatives (2003–2004)	Michigan (Dearborn Heights)
8 January 2021		Jay W. McGee	70	Musician	Michigan (Flint)
6 September 2021		Frank Russell	72	Basketball player (Chicago Bulls)	Michigan (Pontiac)
4 November 2021		Barbara-Rose Collins	82	Member of the U.S. House of Representatives (1991–1997) and member of the Detroit City Council (2001–2009 & 1982–1991)	Michigan (Detroit)
15 October 2022		Cyrus Mann	66	Basketball player	Michigan (Detroit)

=== Minnesota ===
Date	Image	Name	Age	Notes	Place of death
19 May 2020		Annie Glenn	100	Philanthropist	Minnesota (Saint Paul)
21 May 2020		John Zdechlik	83	Composer	Minnesota (White Bear Lake)
14 October 2020		Lance Carson	74	Member of the South Dakota House of Representatives (2017–2019 & 2007–2015)	Minnesota (Minneapolis)
1 November 2020		Julio Bécquer	88	Baseball player (Washington Senators, Minnesota Twins)	Minnesota (Hopkins)
17 December 2020		Arnold D. Gruys	92	Member of the Minnesota House of Representatives (1967–1971)	Minnesota (St. Cloud)
18 December 2020		Jerry Relph	76	Member of the Minnesota Senate (since 2017)	Minnesota (St. Cloud)
7 October 2021		Mel Boehland	78	American football coach	Minnesota
13 February 2022		John Keston	97	Actor (Sweet Charity) and runner	Minnesota (Minneapolis)

=== Mississippi ===
Date	Image	Name	Age	Notes	Place of death
9 August 2020		Kamala	70	Wrestler (WWE)	Mississippi (Oxford)
14 October 2020		Fred Dean	69	American football player (San Francisco 49ers – Super Bowl champion – 1981 & 1984 and Pro Bowl champion – 1979, 1980, 1981 & 1983)	Mississippi (Jackson)
28 December 2020		Nolan Mettetal	75	Member of the Mississippi House of Representatives (2012–2020) and member of the Mississippi Senate (1996–2012)	Mississippi (Oxford)

=== Missouri ===
Date	Image	Name	Age	Notes	Place of death
12 November 2020		Lynn Kellogg	77	Actress (Charro!)	Missouri (St. Louis)
24 December 2020		B. J. Marsh	80	Member of the Missouri House of Representatives (2001–2009 & 1989–1993)	Missouri (Springfield)
8 January 2021		Steve Lightle	61	Comics artist	Missouri (Kansas City)
9 January 2021		John Lutz	81	Writer	Missouri (Chesterfield)
5 February 2021		Butch Reed	66	Wrestler (WWE)	Missouri (Warrensburg)
24 June 2021		Brian Baker	47	Member of the Missouri House of Representatives (2002–2008)	Missouri
4 July 2021		Sanford Clark	85	Singer	Missouri (Joplin)

=== Montana ===
Date	Image	Name	Age	Notes	Place of death
5 February 2022		David Fuller	80	Member of the Montana Senate (1983–1987)	Montana (Helena)

=== Nevada ===
Date	Image	Name	Age	Notes	Place of death
13 July 2020		Kenneth Church	90	Jockey	Nevada (Reno)
27 July 2020		Felicia F. Campbell	89	Academic	Nevada (Las Vegas)
20 August 2020		Frank Cullotta	81	Mobster	Nevada (Las Vegas)
6 September 2020		Bruce Williamson	49	Singer (The Temptations)	Nevada (Las Vegas)
21 September 2020		Tommy DeVito	92	Guitarist (The Four Seasons)	Nevada (Las Vegas)
13 December 2020		Pierre Lacroix	72	Businessman	Nevada (Las Vegas)
22 December 2020		Ron Lurie	79	Mayor of Las Vegas (1987–1991)	Nevada (Las Vegas)
19 January 2021		Nathaniel Burkett	74	Serial killer	Nevada (Carson City)
13 February 2021		Ansley Truitt	70	Basketball player (Dallas Chaparrals)	Nevada (Las Vegas)
23 June 2021		Melissa Coates	52	Professional wrestler and model	Nevada (Las Vegas)
22 August 2021		Eric Wagner	62	Singer (Trouble)	Nevada (Las Vegas)

=== New Hampshire ===
Date	Image	Name	Age	Notes	Place of death
9 December 2020		Dick Hinch	71	Speaker of the New Hampshire House of Representatives (since 2020) and member of the New Hampshire House of Representatives (since 2008)	New Hampshire (Merrimack)
7 March 2022		Renny Cushing	69	Minority Leader of the New Hampshire House of Representatives (since 2020) and member of the New Hampshire House of Representatives (since 2012)	New Hampshire (Hampton)

=== New Jersey ===
Date	Image	Name	Age	Notes	Place of death
24 March 2020		Alan Finder	72	Journalist	New Jersey (Ridgewood)
25 March 2020		Floyd Cardoz	59	Television presenter and chef (Top Chef Masters champion – 2011)	New Jersey (Montclair)
1 April 2020		Wallace Roney	59	Trumpeter (Grammy Award for Best Jazz Instrumental Album – 1995)	New Jersey (Saddle River)
1 April 2020		Bucky Pizzarelli	94	Guitarist	New Jersey (Saddle River)
3 April 2020		Arnold Demain	93	Microbiologist	New Jersey
8 April 2020		Martin S. Fox	95	Journalist	New Jersey (Millburn)
11 April 2020		John Horton Conway	82	Mathematician	New Jersey (New Brunswick)
14 April 2020		Margit Feldman	90	Holocaust survivor	New Jersey (Somerset)
18 April 2020		Bernice Silver	106	Puppeteer and activist	New Jersey (Englewood)
23 April 2020		Al Angrisani	70	Assistant Secretary of Labor (1980–1984)	New Jersey (Plainsboro)
27 April 2020		Yehudah Jacobs	85	Rabbi	New Jersey (Lakewood)
28 April 2020		Zoe Mungin	30	Writer	New Jersey (Rochelle Park)
5 May 2020		Justa Barrios	63	Trade unionist	New Jersey (Long Branch)
15 May 2020		Paul McCurrie	91	Member of the New Jersey General Assembly (1962–1964) and lawyer	New Jersey (Newark)
18 June 2020		Barbara Costikyan	91	Food writer	New Jersey
14 February 2021		Ion Mihai Pacepa	92	Military officer and spy	New Jersey
21 April 2021		Joe Long	88	Guitarist (The Four Seasons)	New Jersey (Long Beach)
8 December 2021		Barry Harris	91	Pianist	New Jersey (North Bergen)
14 December 2021		Henry Orenstein	98	Entrepreneur	New Jersey (Livingston)
11 December 2023		Ken Kelsch	76	Cinematographer	New Jersey (Hackettstown)
18 April 2024		Lee B. Laskin	87	Judge of New Jersey Superior Court (1996–2006)	New Jersey (Evesham Township)
20 June 2024		Haviland Smith	94	CIA station chief	New Jersey (Monroe Township)

=== New Mexico ===
Date	Image	Name	Age	Notes	Place of death
17 February 2021		Christine McHorse	72	Artist	New Mexico (Santa Fe)
3 March 2021		Edward Sandoval	74	Member of the New Mexico House of Representatives (1983–2015)	New Mexico (Albuquerque)
3 February 2025		David Edward Byrd	83	Graphic artist	New Mexico (Albuquerque)

=== New York ===
Date	Image	Name	Age	Notes	Place of death
18 March 2020		Sérgio Trindade	79	Chemical engineer	New York (New York City)
22 March 2020		Mike Longo	83	Pianist	New York (New York City)
23 March 2020		Maurice Berger	63	Cultural historian	New York (Copake)
23 March 2020		Walter Robb	91	Engineer and business executive (GE)	New York (Brooklyn)
23 March 2020		Nashom Wooden	50	Artist	New York (New York City)
24 April 2020		Romi Cohn	91	Rabbi	New York (Brooklyn)
24 April 2020		David Edwards	48	Basketball player (BC Šilutė)	New York (Queens)
25 March 2020		Mark Blum	69	Actor (Crocodile Dundee)	New York (New York City)
26 March 2020		Michael Sorkin	71	Architect	New York (Manhattan)
28 March 2020		William B. Helmreich	74	Sociologist	New York (Great Neck)
28 March 2020		William Wolf	94	Journalist	New York (New York City)
29 March 2020		Beryl Bernay	94	Journalist	New York (Manhattan)
29 March 2020		Maria Mercader	54	Journalist (Emmy Award for Business and Financial Reporting – 2004)	New York (New York City)
29 March 2020		Alan Merrill	69	Singer (Arrows)	New York (New York City)
30 March 2020		Lorena Borjas	59	Immigrant rights activist	New York (Brooklyn)
30 March 2020		Wilhelm Burmann	80	Dancer	New York (New York City)
30 March 2020		James T. Goodrich	73	Doctor	New York (New York City)
31 March 2020		Cristina	64	Singer	New York (New York City)
1 April 2020		Yisroel Friedman	83	Rabbi	New York (New York City)
1 April 2020		Adam Schlesinger	52	Singer-songwriter (Grammy Award for Best Comedy Album – 2009 and 3x Primetime Emmy Award for Outstanding Original Music and Lyrics winner)	New York (Poughkeepsie)
2 April 2020		Patricia Bosworth	86	Journalist	New York (New York City)
2 April 2020		Anick Jesdanun	50	Journalist	New York (New York City)
2 April 2020		Aaron Rubashkin	92	Businessman	New York (New York City)
3 April 2020		Joel Shatzky	76	Writer	New York (Brooklyn)
3 April 2020		Arlene Stringer-Cuevas	86	Member of the New York City Council (1976–1977)	New York (The Bronx)
4 April 2020		Forrest Compton	94	Actor (McBain)	New York (Shelter Island)
4 April 2020		Ken Farnum	89	Olympic sprinter	New York (New York City)
4 April 2020		Lila Fenwick	87	Lawyer	New York (Manhattan)
4 April 2020		Ceybil Jefferies	58	Singer	New York (Manhattan)
4 April 2020		Vincent Lionti	61	Violist	New York (Manhattan)
4 April 2020		Olan Montgomery	56	Actor and pop artist	New York (New York City)
4 April 2020		Jerrold Mundis	79	Writer and speaker	New York (New York City)
4 April 2020		Muhammad Sirajul Islam	77	Member of the Jatiya Sangsad (1972–1983)	New York (Queens)
6 April 2020		Helène Aylon	89	Artist	New York (New York City)
6 April 2020		Brahm Kanchibhotla	66	Journalist	New York (Nassau County)
7 April 2020		Eddy Davis	79	Guitarist (Grammy Award for Best Compilation Soundtrack for Visual Media – 2013)	New York (New York City)
7 April 2020		Leib Groner	88	Rabbi	New York (New York City)
7 April 2020		Yaakov Perlow	89	Rabbi	New York (Brooklyn)
7 April 2020		Hal Willner	64	Music producer (Grammy Award for Best Contemporary Jazz Album – 2005)	New York (New York City)
8 April 2020		Tom Blackwell	82	Artist	New York (Manhattan)
8 April 2020		Richard L. Brodsky	73	Member of the New York State Assembly (1983–2010)	New York (Greenburgh)
8 April 2020		Ilona Murai Kerman	96	Dancer	New York (New York City)
8 April 2020		Joel J. Kupperman	83	Philosopher	New York (Brooklyn)
9 April 2020		Leila Benitez-McCollum	89	Radio presenter	New York (Manhattan)
10 April 2020		Samuel Hargress II	84	Trumpeter	New York (Manhattan)
11 April 2020		Stanley Chera	77	Businessman	New York (New York City)
11 April 2020		Wynn Handman	94	Theatre director	New York (New York City)
13 April 2020		Joel M. Reed	86	Writer	New York (New York City)
13 April 2020		Jerzy Główczewski	97	Military officer	New York (New York City)
14 April 2020		William H. Gerdts	91	Art historian	New York (White Plains)
15 April 2020		Henry Grimes	84	Double bassist	New York (New York City)
15 April 2020		Milena Jelinek	84	Playwright	New York (Brooklyn)
15 April 2020		Lee Konitz	92	Saxophonist	New York (New York City)
15 April 2020		John Pfahl	81	Photographer	New York (Buffalo)
16 April 2020		Henry Miller	89	Lawyer	New York (New York City)
17 April 2020		Giuseppi Logan	84	Saxophonist	New York (Queens)
17 April 2020		Iris Love	86	Archeologist	New York (New York City)
17 April 2020		Arlene Saunders	89	Singer	New York (New York City)
18 April 2020		Eva Konrad Hawkins	90	Biologist	New York (The Bronx)
18 April 2020		Jack Lotz	87	Actor (Raging Bull)	New York (New York City)
19 April 2020		Noach Dear	66	Justice of the Supreme Court of New York (since 2015) and member of the New York City Council (1983–2001)	New York (Brooklyn)
21 April 2020		Gil Bailey	84	Radio presenter	New York (New York City)
21 April 2020		Richard Fenno	94	Scientist	New York (Mount Kisco)
21 April 2020		Philip Foglia	70	Lawyer	New York (Manhattan)
21 April 2020		Yupadee Kobkulboonsiri	51	Artist	New York (Manhattan)
22 April 2020		Muhammad Afzal	81	Olympic wrestler	New York (New York City)
22 April 2020		Samantha Fox	69	Adult actress (A Night to Dismember)	New York (New York City)
23 April 2020		Fred the Godson	35	Rapper	New York (The Bronx)
24 April 2020		Yaakov Schwei	85	Rabbi	New York (Brooklyn)
25 April 2020		Peter Brancazio	81	Physicist	New York (New York City)
25 April 2020		Madeline Kripke	77	Book collector	New York (Manhattan)
27 April 2020		James Mahoney	73	Doctor	New York (New York City)
28 April 2020		Georgianna Glose	73	Nun	New York (Brooklyn)
29 April 2020		Lenora Garfinkel	90	Architect	New York (The Bronx)
5 May 2020		Kiing Shooter	27	Rapper	New York (New York City)
10 May 2020		Nita Pippins	93	Nurse	New York (Manhattan)
13 May 2020		Jean Lau Chin	75	Clinical psychologist	New York (New York City)
14 May 2020		Joey Giambra	87	Actor (Marshall)	New York (Buffalo)
20 June 2020		Joseph Ferris	85	Member of the New York State Assembly (1975–1985)	New York (Brooklyn)
16 November 2020		Ian Finkel	72	Musician	New York (Manhattan)
19 December 2020		Elaine Stack	89	Justice of the Supreme Court of New York (2000–2008)	New York (Manhasset)
30 December 2020		Lois Sasson	80	Jewelry designer	New York (Brooklyn)
6 January 2021		Burt Wilson	87	Jazz musician	New York (New Berlin)
27 January 2021		Corky Lee	73	Photographer	New York (Manhattan)
27 January 2021		Carmen Vázquez	72	LGBT rights activist	New York (New York City)
29 January 2021		Richard L. Feigen	90	Gallery owner	New York (Mount Kisco)
3 February 2021		Robb Webb	82	Voice actor (Fishing with John)	New York (New York City)
16 March 2021		Amaranth Ehrenhalt	93	Painter	New York (Manhattan)
29 March 2021		Theodore Lambrinos	85	Singer	New York (Brooklyn)
15 April 2021		Moshe Ber Beck	86	Rabbi	New York (Monsey)
16 July 2021		Harry M. Rosenfeld	91	Journalist	New York (Slingerlands)
20 August 2021		Mark Hamister	70	Businessman	New York
12 January 2022		J. Robert Wright	85	Priest	New York (New York City)
18 January 2022		David L. Paul	82	Banker	New York (New York City)
18 January 2022		André Leon Talley	73	Fashion journalist (Vogue)	New York (White Plains)
21 January 2022		Arnie Kantrowitz	81	LGBT rights activist and writer	New York (Manhattan)
31 January 2022		James Bidgood	88	Photographer	New York (New York City)
13 March 2022		Christopher Moore	70	Historian	New York (Brooklyn)
17 April 2022		DJ Kay Slay	55	DJ and record executive	New York (New York City)
22 May 2022		Lee Lawson	80	Actress (Guiding Light)	New York (New York City)
26 July 2022		Eli N. Evans	85	Writer	New York (Manhattan)
26 July 2022		Sy Johnson	92	Jazz composer	New York (New York City)
15 November 2022		Manuel Sanguily	89	Physician and swimmer	New York
27 January 2023		Alfred Leslie	95	Painter and filmmaker	New York (Brooklyn)
21 February 2023		Achebe Betty Powell	82	Activist and community leader	New York (Brooklyn)
9 January 2024		Edward Jay Epstein	88	Investigative journalist and professor	New York (New York City)
29 January 2024		Alice Mackler	92	Artist and painter	New York (Manhattan)
11 March 2024		David Mixner	77	Political activist and author	New York (Manhattan)
8 July 2024		Dan Collins	80	Journalist and author	New York (Manhattan)
15 February 2025		M. Paul Friedberg	93	Landscape architect	New York (Manhattan)
15 June 2025		Thornton Willis	89	Painter	New York (New York City)

=== North Carolina ===
Date	Image	Name	Age	Notes	Place of death
25 May 2020		Marv Luster	82	Canadian football player (Toronto Argonauts)	North Carolina (Matthews)
28 November 2020		Lon Adams	95	Food scientist	North Carolina (Raleigh)
5 January 2021		Thelma Shoher Baker	96	Anthropologist	North Carolina (Chapel Hill)
3 March 2021		Jim Crockett Jr.	76	Professional wrestling promoter (National Wrestling Alliance)	North Carolina (Charlotte)
24 April 2021		Bob Fass	87	Radio presenter	North Carolina (Monroe)
29 September 2021		Lee Vernon McNeill	56	Olympic sprinter	North Carolina (Fayetteville)
29 September 2021		Julia Nixon	66	Singer	North Carolina (Raleigh)

=== North Dakota ===
Date	Image	Name	Age	Notes	Place of death
5 October 2020		David Andahl	55	Member-elect of the North Dakota House of Representatives (since 2020)	North Dakota
30 September 2021		Donna Nalewaja	81	Member of the North Dakota Senate (1986–1998) and member of the North Dakota House of Representatives (1982–1986)	North Dakota (Fargo)

=== Ohio ===
Date	Image	Name	Age	Notes	Place of death
5 April 2020		Lee Fierro	91	Actress (Jaws)	Ohio (Aurora)
14 April 2020		Helen Damico	89	Scholar	Ohio (Akron)
23 November 2020		Dorothy Gill Barnes	93	Artist	Ohio (Columbus)
9 December 2020		Donald Cozzens	82	Priest and author	Ohio (Columbus)
28 December 2020		Romell Broom	64	Convicted murderer	Ohio (Columbus)
1 September 2021		Doug Green	66	Member of the Ohio House of Representatives (2013–2020)	Ohio (Mt. Orab)
3 January 2022		Jud Logan	62	Olympic track and field athlete	Ohio (Ashland)
4 January 2022		Tommy Matchick	78	Baseball player (Detroit Tigers)	Ohio (Sylvania)
11 January 2022		Don Sutherin	85	Canadian football and American football player (Hamilton Tiger-Cats, Ottawa Rough Riders, Pittsburgh Steelers)	Ohio (Canton)
26 January 2022		Bud Brown	94	Member of the U.S. House of Representatives (1965–1983)	Ohio (Urbana)
30 January 2022		Philip Paul	96	Drummer	Ohio (Cincinnati)
14 March 2022		Steve Wilhite	74	Computer scientist	Ohio (Cincinnati)

=== Oklahoma ===
Date	Image	Name	Age	Notes	Place of death
29 September 2020		Rebecca Cryer	73	Lawyer and judge	Oklahoma (Norman)
9 February 2021		Prince McJunkins	60	Canadian football player (Ottawa Rough Riders)	Oklahoma (Tulsa)

=== Oregon ===
Date	Image	Name	Age	Notes	Place of death
20 August 2022		Theodore Bugas	98	Member of the Oregon House of Representatives (1977–1983)	Oregon (Portland)

=== Pennsylvania ===
Date	Image	Name	Age	Notes	Place of death
6 April 2020		Stephen Sulyk	95	Archbishop of Philadelphia (1980–2000)	Pennsylvania (Vorhees)
6 April 2020		Ella King Russell Torrey	94	Journalist	Pennsylvania (Philadelphia)
17 April 2020		Gene Shay	85	Radio presenter	Pennsylvania (Lower Merion)
18 April 2020		Jim Fraser	83	American football player (Denver Broncos)	Pennsylvania (Lansdale)
18 April 2020		Emma Weigley	87	Nutritionist	Pennsylvania (South Philadelphia)
21 April 2020		Teruyuki Okazaki	88	Karateka	Pennsylvania (Philadelphia)
22 April 2020		Bootsie Barnes	82	Saxophonist	Pennsylvania (Wynnewood)
25 April 2020		Alan Abel	95	Percussionist	Pennsylvania (Wynnewood)
29 April 2020		Dick Lucas	86	American football player (Philadelphia Eagles)	Pennsylvania (Philadelphia)
9 November 2020		Eleanor Schano	88	Journalist	Pennsylvania (Pittsburgh)
22 December 2020		Edmund M. Clarke	75	Computer scientist	Pennsylvania (Pittsburgh)
19 January 2021		William Fey	79	Bishop of Kimbe (since 2010)	Pennsylvania (Pittsburgh)
2 February 2021		Grant Jackson	78	Baseball player (Pittsburgh Pirates – All-Star – 1969 champion and World Series – 1979 champion)	Pennsylvania (North Strabane)
3 February 2021		Anne Feeney	69	Singer-songwriter	Pennsylvania (Pittsburgh)
20 March 2021		Buddy Deppenschmidt	85	Drummer	Pennsylvania (Doylestown)
23 August 2021		Brick Bronsky	57	Wrestler and actor (Sgt. Kabukiman N.Y.P.D.)	Pennsylvania (Allentown)
16 January 2022		Jeremy Sivits	42	Dishonorably Discharged Private in Abu Ghraib prisoner abuse scandal	Pennsylvania (Roaring Spring)
16 December 2022		Charlie Gracie	86	Singer	Pennsylvania (Philadelphia)
31 March 2023		Ada Bello	89	LGBT rights activist	Pennsylvania (Philadelphia)
1 August 2024		Joe Hand Sr.	87	businessman and media executive	Pennsylvania (Philadelphia)

=== Rhode Island ===
Date	Image	Name	Age	Notes	Place of death
14 January 2021		John LaRose	69	Baseball Player (Boston Red Sox)	Rhode Island (Cumberland)

=== Puerto Rico ===
Date	Image	Name	Age	Notes	Place of death
27 December 2020		Osvaldo Rivera Cianchini	80	Judge	Puerto Rico (San Juan)
2 September 2021		Efren Arroyo	68	Television presenter	Puerto Rico (San Juan)

=== South Carolina ===
Date	Image	Name	Age	Notes	Place of death
15 December 2020		Donald Fowler	85	Chairman of the Democratic National Committee (1995–1997) and Chairman of the South Carolina Democratic Party (1971–1980)	South Carolina (Columbia)
1 December 2022		Gaylord Perry	84	Baseball player (San Francisco Giants) – All-Star champion x6)	South Carolina (Gaffney)

=== South Dakota ===
Date	Image	Name	Age	Notes	Place of death
3 April 2020		Bob Glanzer	74	Member of the South Dakota House of Representatives (since 2017)	South Dakota (Sioux Falls)
5 January 2021		Jim Sperry	90	Member of the South Dakota House of Representatives (1997–1998)	South Dakota (Aberdeen)

=== Tennessee ===
Date	Image	Name	Age	Notes	Place of death
29 March 2020		Joe Diffie	61	Singer-songwriter (Grammy Award for Best Country Collaboration with Vocals – 1998)	Tennessee (Nashville)
7 April 2020		John Prine	73	Singer (Grammy Award for Best Contemporary Folk Album – 1991 & 2005)	Tennessee (Nashville)
3 September 2020		Bill Pursell	94	Composer	Tennessee (Nashville)
5 September 2020		Smokey Gaines	80	Basketball coach (San Diego State)	Tennessee (Memphis)
20 October 2020		John Condrone	59	Wrestler (WCW) and singer-songwriter	Tennessee (Maryville)
13 November 2020		Jim Pace	59	Racing driver	Tennessee (Memphis)
13 November 2020		Henry Slaughter	93	Pianist	Tennessee (Knoxville)
16 December 2020		Carl Mann	78	Rockabilly singer	Tennessee (Jackson)
21 December 2020		K. T. Oslin	78	Singer-songwriter (Grammy Award for Best Female Country Vocal Performance – 1987 & 1988 and Grammy Award for Best Country Song – 1988)	Tennessee (Nashville)
29 December 2020		Hugh X. Lewis	90	Country music singer	Tennessee (Nashville)
26 January 2021		Ron Johnson	64	Baseball manager (Norfolk Tides)	Tennessee (Murfreesboro)
4 February 2021		David Shephard	73	Member of the Tennessee House of Representatives (2001–2017)	Tennessee (Nashville)
21 August 2021		Phil Valentine	61	COVID-19 skeptic and radio host	Tennessee (Nashville)
22 August 2021		Danton Barto	50	Canadian football player (Memphis Mad Dogs)	Tennessee
26 August 2021		Kenny Malone	83	Drummer	Tennessee (Nashville)
9 September 2021		Richard McGeagh	77	Olympic swimmer	Tennessee (Heritage)
14 October 2021		Phil Leadbetter	59	Guitarist	Tennessee (Knoxville)
4 January 2022		Ross Browner	67	American football player (Cincinnati Bengals)	Tennessee (Nashville)
22 January 2022		Meat Loaf	74	Singer-songwriter (Grammy Award for Best Solo Rock Vocal Performance – 1994)	Tennessee (Nashville)

=== Texas ===
Date	Image	Name	Age	Notes	Place of death
27 March 2020		Orlando McDaniel	59	American football player (Denver Broncos)	Texas (Dallas)
28 March 2020		Pearson Jordan	69	Olympic sprinter	Texas (Dallas)
2 April 2020		Robert Beck	83	Olympic pentathlete (Bronze – 1960)	Texas (San Antonio)
5 April 2020		Ronnie Earle	78	District Attorney of Travis County (1977–2009) and member of the Texas House of Representatives (1973–1976)	Texas (Austin)
20 May 2020		Denis Farkasfalvy	83	Priest	Texas (Dallas)
27 May 2020		Billie Lee Turner	95	Botanist	Texas (Houston)
28 May 2020		David Owen Brooks	65	Convicted murderer	Texas (Galveston)
14 June 2020		Stephen Susman	79	Attorney	Texas (Houston)
15 July 2020		Kenny Dale	68	Singer	Texas (San Antonio)
31 July 2020		Bill Mack	91	Singer-songwriter (Grammy Award for Best Country Song – 1997)	Texas (Dallas)
29 October 2020		H. Tati Santiesteban	85	Member of the Texas Senate (1973–1991) and member of the Texas House of Representatives (1967–1973)	Texas (El Paso)
30 October 2020		Byron Bradfute	82	American football player (Dallas Cowboys)	Texas (New Braunfels)
3 November 2020		Irvin Baxter Jr.	75	Pastor	Texas (Plano)
14 November 2020		Lindy McDaniel	84	Baseball player (St. Louis Cardinals – All-Star champion – 1960)	Texas (Carrollton)
15 November 2020		Leon Claire Metz	90	Cultural historian	Texas (El Paso)
12 December 2020		Charley Pride	86	Singer (Grammy Award for Best Male Country Vocal Performance – 1972 & Grammy Award for Best Gospel/Contemporary Christian Music Performance – 1971)	Texas (Dallas)
4 January 2021		Bernard P. Randolph	87	Commander of Air Force Systems Command (1987–1990)	Texas (San Antonio)
6 January 2021		Kenneth Z. Altshuler	91	Doctor	Texas (Dallas)
14 January 2021		Larry Willoughby	70	Country singer-songwriter and music executive (Capitol Records)	Texas (Sherman)
31 January 2021		Nate Hawkins	70	American football player (Houston Oilers)	Texas (Houston)
31 January 2021		Ray Rayburn	72	Audio engineer	Texas (Arlington)
1 February 2021		Emil J. Freireich	93	Doctor	Texas (Houston)
7 February 2021		Ron Wright	67	Member of the United States House of Representatives (since 2019)	Texas (Dallas)
14 February 2021		Dave Nalle	61	Political writer	Texas
18 April 2021		Paul Oscher	74	Guitarist	Texas (Austin)
15 May 2021		Charlie Jackson	85	American football player (Chicago Cardinals)	Texas (Paris)
4 August 2021		J. R. Richard	71	Baseball player (Houston Astros – All-Star champion – 1980)	Texas (Houston)
17 August 2021		Saul Soliz	55	Mixed martial artist	Texas (Houston)
1 September 2021		Jim Fuller	76	American football coach (Alabama)	Texas (Houston)
30 November 2021		Marcus Lamb	64	Televangelist and pastor	Texas (Bedford)
18 January 2022		Ron Franklin	79	Sportscaster (ESPN)	Texas (Austin)
21 January 2022		James Forbes	69	Olympic basketball player (Silver – 1972)	Texas (El Paso)
6 February 2022		Gary DeLaune	88	News reporter and sportscaster (KENS)	Texas (San Antonio)
18 February 2022		Brad Johnson	62	Actor (Philadelphia Experiment II) and model	Texas (Fort Worth)
19 March 2022		Tom Moody	60s	Artist	Texas (Goldthwaite)
18 September 2022		Vincent Di Maio	81	Pathologist	Texas (San Antonio)
11 March 2024		Paul Alexander	78	Lawyer and polio survivor, iron lung user since 1952	Texas (Dallas)

=== Utah ===
Date	Image	Name	Age	Notes	Place of death
29 March 2020		Robert H. Garff	77	Speaker of the Utah House of Representatives (1985–1987) and member of the Utah House of Representatives (1978–1987)	Utah (Salt Lake City)
2 November 2020		Oscar W. McConkie Jr.	94	Member of the Utah State Senate (1965–1967) and member of the Utah House of Representatives (1955–1965)	Utah (Salt Lake City)
18 January 2021		Tony Ingle	68	Basketball coach (Dalton State)	Utah (Provo)
19 February 2021		Jerold Ottley	86	Choral conductor (Tabernacle Choir)	Utah (Salt Lake City)
28 February 2021		Tom Green	72	Mormon fundamentalist	Utah (Salt Lake City)
29 July 2021		Tomasi Takau	52	Rugby union player	Utah (St. George)

=== Vermont ===
Date	Image	Name	Age	Notes	Place of death
8 April 2020		Bernie Juskiewicz	77	Member of the Vermont House of Representatives (2013–2019)	Vermont (Montpelier)
18 February 2022		Tom Veitch	80	Comic book writer (The Light and Darkness War)	Vermont (Bellows Falls)

=== Virginia ===
Date	Image	Name	Age	Notes	Place of death
24 March 2020		Sterling Maddox	78	Member of the Maryland House of Delegates (1971–1974)	Virginia (Arlington)
13 April 2020		Jerry Givens	67	Activist	Virginia (Richmond)
2 May 2020		Meyer Rubin	96	Geologist	Virginia (Manassas)
16 May 2020		Wilson Roosevelt Jerman	91	White House butler	Virginia (Woodbridge)
28 May 2020		Robert M. Laughlin	85	Linguist	Virginia (Arlington)
27 August 2020		William Neikirk	82	Journalist	Virginia (Arlington)
15 October 2020		Warren Mitchell	87	Basketball coach (William & Mary)	Virginia (Midlothian)
31 October 2020		Barbara Ann Rowan	82	Attorney	Virginia (Arlington)
12 November 2020		William T. Beaver	87	Doctor	Virginia (Leesburg)
8 December 2020		Lay Nam Chang	77	Physicist	Virginia
1 January 2021		Ben Chafin	60	Member of the Virginia Senate (since 2014) and House of Delegates (2014)	Virginia (Richmond)
11 January 2021		Howard Teten	88	FBI agent	Virginia
20 January 2022		Sidney August Anthony Miller Jr.	89	Music industry executive	Virginia (Arlington)
24 January 2022		Olavo de Carvalho	74	COVID-19 skeptic and political pundit	Virginia (Richmond)
29 April 2022		Robert Goolrick	73	Writer	Virginia (Lynchburg)
14 January 2024		Tom Shales	79	Writer and television critic	Virginia (Alexandria)
25 March 2025		J. Bennett Johnston	92	Member of the United States Senate (1972–1997)	Virginia (McLean)
30 July 2025		T. S. Ellis III	85	Judge of the U.S. District Court for Eastern Virginia (since 1987)	Virginia (Keswick)

=== Washington, D.C. ===
Date	Image	Name	Age	Notes	Place of death
1 April 2020		David Driskell	88	Artist	Washington, D.C.
20 April 2020		H. G. Carrillo	60	Writer	Washington, D.C.
24 April 2020		Gerald Slater	86	Television producer (PBS)	Washington, D.C.
7 August 2020		Stephen F. Williams	83	Judge of the U.S. Court of Appeals for the District of Columbia Circuit (since 1986)	Washington, D.C.
21 November 2020		Donal Leace	81	Musician	Washington, D.C.
5 February 2021		Hershel Shanks	90	Author and editor	Washington, D.C.
9 December 2022		Milton Viorst	92	Journalist	Washington, D.C.
14 September 2025		Tess Johnston	93	Foreign service officer	Washington, D.C.

=== Washington (state) ===
Date	Image	Name	Age	Notes	Place of death
17 March 2020		Stephen Schwartz	78	Pathologist	Washington (Seattle)
8 April 2020		Rick May	79	Actor (The Further Adventures of Sherlock Holmes)	Washington (Seattle)
9 April 2020		Theresa M. Korn	93	Engineer	Washington (Wenatchee)
1 September 2021		Dan Swecker	74	Member of the Washington State Senate (1995–2013)	Washington (Rochester)
25 July 2022		Richard Tait	58	Board game designer	Washington (Bainbridge Island)
9 October 2022		Chuck Deardorf	68	Musician	Washington (Seattle)

=== Wisconsin ===
Date	Image	Name	Age	Notes	Place of death
29 November 2020		Richard C. West	76	Librarian	Wisconsin (Madison)
25 December 2020		Reginald Foster	81	Priest	Wisconsin (Milwaukee)

=== Wyoming ===
Date	Image	Name	Age	Notes	Place of death
2 November 2020		Roy Edwards	66	Member of the Wyoming House of Representatives (since 2015)	Wyoming (Casper)

== See also ==
- Deaths in 2020
- Deaths in 2021
- Deaths in 2022
- Deaths in 2023
- List of deaths due to COVID-19
