= Strozier =

Strozier is a surname. Notable people with the surname include:

- Art Strozier (1946–2018), American football player
- Frank Strozier (born 1937), American jazz saxophonist
- Lynika Strozier (1984–2020), American scientist
- Robert M. Strozier (1906–1960), American academic administrator
- Wilbur Strozier (born 1964), American football player
