= Chi Alpha Sigma =

Honor society for collegiate student-athletes

- ΧΑΣ
- Founded: May 17, 1996; 30 years ago DePauw University
- Type: Honor
- Affiliation: ACHS
- Status: Active
- Emphasis: Athletics
- Scope: National
- Motto: "Excellence in Athletics and Academics"
- Colors: Gold and Black
- Chapters: 559
- Headquarters: PO Box 898; River Falls, Wisconsin 54022-0898; United States
- Website: www.chialphasigma.org

Chi Alpha Sigma (ΧΑΣ), also known as the National College Athlete Honor Society, is an honor society for collegiate student-athletes. Established in 1996, it was the first national society to honor four-year college scholar-athletes who excel in both the classroom and athletics.

== History ==
Nick Mourouzis formed the National College Athlete Honor Society at DePauw University in Greencastle, Indiana on May 17, 1996. Mourouzis was the head football coach and a professor of kinesiology at DePauw. Although there were existing organizations that honored athletics for academic accomplishments, Mourouzis wanted student-athletes who lettered in their sport while also maintaining a high-grade point average. He worked on the legal aspects of such an organization during a sabbatical in 1995.

Mourouzis envisioned an organization to honor student-athletes the way Phi Beta Kappa recognizes scholars. The Greek letters Chi Alpha Sigma were chosen to represent the honor society. He recruited coaches for the society's governing board that represent various levels of competition. The charter board included:

- Jona Braden, Butler University
- Scott Duncan, Rose-Hulman Institute of Technology
- Mary English, DePauw University
- John Friend, Purdue University-Calumet
- David Huffman, University of Indianapolis
- Elizabeth "Buzz" Kurpius, Indiana University
- Nick Mourouzis, DePauw University
- Joe Romine, Taylor University

The Alpha chapter was chartered at DePauw University. From there, the honor society expanded to other colleges and universities in Indiana. It then expanded across the United States.

== Symbols ==
The honor society's primary colors are gold and black. Its motto is "Excellence in Athletics and Academics."

== Chapters ==
Chi Alpha Sigma has chapters located across the United States. As of November 11, 2026, it has 559 active chapters.

== Membership ==
Varsity athletes in all college sports are eligible to join Chi Alpha Sigma if a local chapter has been established on campus. Its membership requirements are an endorsement from their head coach as to their good moral character, standing as a junior or senior, and completion of four fulltime academic semesters with a minimum 3.5 GPA.

== Notable members ==
- Adam Presa, member of the New Hampshire House of Representatives
- Jenna Rheault, professional hockey player

== See also ==
- Honor cords
