= Adam Presa =

American politician (born 2002)

The Honorable Adam Presa

Member of the New Hampshire House of Representatives from the Hillsborough 12th district
- Incumbent
- Assumed office December 4, 2024
- Succeeded by: Heather Robitaille (elect)

Personal details
- Born: June 23, 2002 (age 24)
- Party: Republican
- Education: Merrimack High School and New England College
- Website: LinkedIn

Adam Presa (born June 23, 2002) is an American politician. He is a member of the New Hampshire House of Representatives for Hillsborough County's 12th District, serving the town of Merrimack. He assumed office on December 4, 2024. He is one of the youngest state legislators in the United States.

When elected in 2024, Presa became one of the few members of Generation Z. serving within the New Hampshire House of Representatives, alongside Valerie McDonnell.

== Early life and education ==
Adam Presa was born on June 23, 2002, to parents Mark and Billie Presa, and is native to the town of Merrimack. Adam graduated from Merrimack High School in 2020, and in 2024 he graduated from New England College with a Bachelor of Arts in business administration (cum laude). In 2025, he graduated with a Master of Business Administration from New England College. While an undergraduate at New England College, he competed on the school's NCAA Division III wrestling team. While on the team, he was named twice to the New England Wrestling Association's All-Academic team. His senior year, he was named to the Chi Alpha Sigma athletic honor society. During his graduate year, he served as the graduate assistant wrestling coach for the New England College men's and women's wrestling team.

Currently, Presa is a real estate agent with Realty One Group Next Level in Bedford, NH.
