= Nick Mourouzis =

American football player and coach (1937–2020)

Biographical details
- Born: April 16, 1937; Tuscarawas County, Ohio, U.S.
- Died: September 16, 2020 (aged 83); Greencastle, Indiana, U.S.

Playing career
- 1956–1958: Miami (OH)
- Position: Quarterback

Coaching career (HC unless noted)
- 1959–1961: Ohio (GA)
- 1962: Ball State (assistant)
- 1963–1964: Ohio (assistant)
- 1965–1973: Indiana (assistant)
- 1974–1980: Northwestern (assistant)
- 1981–2003: DePauw

Head coaching record
- Overall: 138–87–4

Accomplishments and honors

Championships
- 2 ICAC (1990, 1996)

Nick Mourouzis (April 16, 1937 – September 16, 2020) was an American football player and coach. He served as the head football coach at DePauw University in Greencastle, Indiana, from 1981 to 2003, compiling a record of 138–87–4. As a college football player, Mourouzis was a starting quarterback at Miami University in Oxford, Ohio.

== Biography ==
Nick Mourouzis was born on April 16, 1937, in Tuscarawas County, Ohio. He played football and baseball in high school, and was discovered by Ara Parseghian who recruited him to play for Miami University. He graduated from Miami in 1959, and received his master's degree in 1961. In 1971, he received another master's degree from Indiana University Bloomington.

He served as the head football coach at DePauw University in Greencastle, Indiana, from 1981 to 2003, compiling a record of 133–82–4. In 1996, Mourouzis founded Chi Alpha Sigma Honor Society for Student-Athletes.

Mourouzis died from complications of COVID-19 in Greencastle, Indiana, on September 16, 2020, at the age of 83, during the COVID-19 pandemic in Indiana.

== Head coaching record ==
| Year | Team | Overall | Conference | Standing | Bowl/playoffs |
|---|---|---|---|---|---|
DePauw Tigers (NCAA Division III independent) (1981–1988)
| 1981 | DePauw | 9–1 | | | |
| 1982 | DePauw | 8–2 | | | |
| 1983 | DePauw | 7–3 | | | |
| 1984 | DePauw | 6–4 | | | |
| 1985 | DePauw | 8–2 | | | |
| 1986 | DePauw | 6–4 | | | |
| 1987 | DePauw | 7–3 | | | |
| 1988 | DePauw | 4–5 | | | |
DePauw Tigers (Indiana Collegiate Athletic Conference) (1989–1997)
| 1989 | DePauw | 6–2–2 | 4–1–2 | | |
| 1990 | DePauw | 8–2 | 7–0 | 1st | |
| 1991 | DePauw | 6–1 | 4–2 | T–2nd | |
| 1992 | DePauw | 4–4–2 | 3–1–2 | T–2nd | |
| 1993 | DePauw | 2–8 | 1–5 | T–6th | |
| 1994 | DePauw | 2–8 | 1–5 | 6th | |
| 1985 | DePauw | 3–7 | 1–5 | 7th | |
| 1996 | DePauw | 9–1 | 6–0 | 1st | |
| 1997 | DePauw | 8–2 | 5–1 | 2nd | |
DePauw Tigers (Southern Collegiate Athletic Conference) (1998–2003)
| 1998 | DePauw | 7–3 | 5–1 | 2nd | |
| 1999 | DePauw | 5–5 | 3–3 | T–4th | |
| 2000 | DePauw | 6–4 | 4–2 | T–2nd | |
| 2001 | DePauw | 5–5 | 4–2 | 3rd | |
| 2002 | DePauw | 7–3 | 5–1 | 2nd | |
| 2003 | DePauw | 5–5 | 3–3 | T–4th | |
| DePauw: | | 138–87–4 | 56–32–4 | | |
| Total: | | 138–87–4 | | | |
National championship Conference title Conference division title or championship game berth
