= Justa Barrios =

American home care worker (died 2020)

Justa Barrios (died May 2, 2020) was an American home care worker and labor organizer who worked with the Ain't I A Woman? campaign, a coalition of professional caregivers, against the 24-hour workday and the National Mobilization Against Sweatshops (NMASS), a grassroots labor organization.

== Life ==
Barrios was a home care worker for 18 years and notably worked 24-hour shifts for over 14 years, five days a week. She developed severe asthma and heart problems as a result. On May 2, 2020, the Aint I A Woman? campaign reported that Barrios had died of COVID-19.

Barrios was working to distribute Personal Protective Equipment to home care workers throughout New York City shortly before she contracted COVID-19.

Barrios worked with the Ain't I A Woman? campaign to change the state of New York's labor regulations which permitted agencies to pay workers only 13 hours for a 24-hour workday. Some workers had been required to work shifts of five to six days straight, which Barrios and others recognized as an inhumane policy. Barrios recognized that she did this work "at a huge cost to my health." She was told by her doctor that she could no longer work these hours because of her depleting health. However, Allcare Homecare Agency, the home care agency she worked for, refused to give her work other than 24-hour shifts, which left Barrios unemployed. When Barrios and other workers complained about unpaid wages to the agency, they were reportedly threatened with deportation by Allcare, who would report them to the U.S. Immigration and Customs Enforcement.

An objective of the Ain't I A Woman? campaign was achieved in September 2018 when a court decision ruled that the practice of paying workers for half of a 24-hour shift was "null and void." Barrios expressed her approval of the ruling, stating "I feel happy! We face so much abuse working these 24-hour shifts — and they only pay us for half! We do this work because patients need this care around the clock. But working all this 24-hour shifts has hurt my health, my family." The Allcare Homecare Agency was forced by New York Attorney General Letitia James in 2019 to pay a settlement of over $450,000 for regularly only paying workers "for 13 hours when they had worked more than that during 24-hour shifts — all while taking home minimum wage and looking after disabled and elderly New Yorkers." In response to the attorney general's ruling, Barrios was supportive and stated "we’re human beings. We have families and we have people we care for with serious health issues."

On March 2, 2020, Barrios was one of over 200 workers protesting Governor Andrew Cuomo calling for vetoing the Securing Wages Earned Against Theft (SWEAT) bill, which would have given workers and the New York Department of Labor the tools to hold employers accountable to the state's labor laws. The bill had been in the works for many years and had passed both houses of New York's state legislature in 2019 before being vetoed by Cuomo. Barrios supported the bill for addressing wage theft, which amounts to an estimated $1 billion in New York every year, stating “all of us workers need SWEAT because we need to collect our stolen wage. But Cuomo doesn’t care about us. Instead of defending us, he’s defending the bosses who are criminals. He’s helping the criminals.” At the protests, Barrios could reportedly be heard from miles away.

== Death ==
Amidst the COVID-19 pandemic in New Jersey, Barrios continued calling other home care workers about the conditions they were enduring as health workers who were not given protective equipment and how this could be addressed. Barrios positioned the responsibility for these failures on Governor Cuomo.

On May 2, 2020, the Aint I A Woman? campaign reported that Barrios had died of COVID-19 at age 63 in Long Branch, New Jersey. Barrios is remembered by members of the National Mobilization Against Sweatshops (NMASS) as a fearless organizer and fighter of injustice. In a statement on her death, the organization affirmed "while we are grieving, we are also angry. And we will use this anger to keep fighting to change our system that robs people of their time, their health, and their livelihoods, in Justa’s spirit. We love her, and we’ll take her with us."
