= Maria Mercader =

American journalist (1965–2020)

- Born: Maria Carla Mercader; November 28, 1965; New York City, U.S.
- Died: March 29, 2020 (aged 54); New York City, U.S.
- Occupations: Journalist and news producer
- Years active: 1987–2020

Maria Carla Mercader (November 28, 1965 – March 29, 2020) was an American journalist and news producer who worked for CBS News for over three decades. For her work producing a CBS feature report about computer spam, Mercader won a business Emmy Award in 2004. In 2020, she died of COVID-19 during its pandemic in New York City.

== Early life ==
Mercader was born on November 28, 1965, in New York City to Manuel and Gladys Mercader. She studied at Dominican Academy, then at the College of New Rochelle, where she graduated in 1987.

== Career ==
Mercader started working for CBS News in 1987 as a page in the company's page program, then began her news career at CBS Newspath, where she produced pieces for distribution at CBS' affiliates. She also worked on the network's foreign and national news desks, helping to produce breaking news pieces on the death of Princess Diana and the September 11 attacks. In 2004, Mercader won an Emmy Award for Business and Financial Reporting for helping to produce "The Little Engine That Could, Spam" a CBS News Sunday Morning feature report on computer spam.

Mercader was appointed as director of talent strategy in 2016 where she helped improve workplace diversity and coordinated CBS News' participation with the Asian American Journalists Association (AAJA), the National Lesbian and Gay Journalists Association, and the National Association of Black Journalists. She graduated from the AAJA's Executive Leadership Program in Chicago in 2004.

== Death ==
For over two decades before her death, Mercader had numerous illnesses, including cancer. In the last week of February 2020, she took medical leave, then died from the COVID-19 pandemic at a New York hospital on March 29, 2020.
