= Anick Jesdanun =

American journalist (c.1969–2020)

- Born: c. 1969; Pittsburgh, Pennsylvania, U.S.
- Died: April 2020 (aged 50–51); New York City, U.S.
- Other name: Nick Jesdanun
- Education: Swarthmore College
- Occupation: Technology journalist
- Years active: 1991–2020
- Employer: Associated Press
- Known for: First "internet writer" for the Associated Press

Anick "Nick" Jesdanun (Thai: อนิก เจษฎานันท์; c. 1969 – April 2, 2020) was an American technology journalist who served as deputy technology editor for the Associated Press (AP). Jesdanun covered technology, especially the internet, for AP for more than twenty years and sought to help readers navigate the relatively new technology and its impact on daily life, from the 1990s to 2020. Jesdanun was the first Associated Press reporter to be assigned as an "internet writer" in the news agency's history.

== Early life and education ==
Jesdanun's parents, Adisak and Orabhin Jesdanun, immigrated to the United States from Thailand. He was originally from Pittsburgh, Pennsylvania, but was raised in New Jersey. He earned a bachelor's degree from Swarthmore College in 1991.

== Career ==
After college, Jesdanun was hired as a reporter for the Associated Press, where he remained for his entire professional career. He wrote for the AP bureaus in Philadelphia (until 1993), Harrisburg, and Washington, D.C. He then moved to the AP headquarters in New York City, where he became the agency's first internet writer in history.

In a 2000 AP story, Jesdanun predicted that devices connected to the internet would be able to track a user location, years before the technology became widely used in consumer products. In recent years, Jesdanun released a series of humorous, informative videos called the AP "Tech Tests," where he demonstrated and tested new consumer technology and tech products, such as the Apple iPhone facial recognition system in 2017.

== Personal life ==
A resident of the Yorkville neighborhood of Manhattan, Jesdanun had run more than 83 marathons worldwide, a hobby he began in his 30s, including fifteen New York City Marathons.

=== Death ===
Anick Jesdanun died from COVID-19 in the early days of the pandemic at a New York City hospital on April 2, 2020, at the age of 51. As many Americans dismissed the danger of COVID-19 as limited to vulnerable population subgroups, Jesdanun's death was notable because according to family and colleagues, he had no underlying health problems before becoming ill with coronavirus.
