= Margaret Waterchief =

Blackfoot elder and Anglican priest (died 2020)

Margaret Waterchief was a Blackfoot elder and Anglican priest. A member of the Siksika Nation and the Piikani Nation, Waterchief attended the St. Cyprian's Anglican Residential School in Piikani until the age of 17. As a residential school student she was discouraged from speaking the Blackfoot language and was prevented from seeing her family, who lived nearby, beyond a few hours each Saturday. After graduating she relocated to Siksika, where she met and married Raymond Waterchief, with whom she had 10 children. Both struggled with alcoholism. Following Raymond's death in 1976 at the age of 42, Waterchief drank for several years before getting sober and turning more actively to the Anglican church. She served as a counsellor for those also dealing with alcoholism and as a lay Anglican pastor.

Waterchief was ordained as an Anglican minister in 1994 at the age of 62. She was the first Indigenous woman to be ordained within Anglican Diocese of Calgary. Waterchief was an advocate for underprivileged and vulnerable people, working for several years with the Calgary Urban Projects Society. A lifetime member of the Anglican Church Women, she played an instrumental role in establishing a day care centre on the Siksika reserve. She also served as a member of the Siksika Band Council for 16 years, after being elected in 1967.

Waterchief died on 19 July 2020, aged 88, at the Peter Lougheed Centre in Calgary, as a result of complications related to COVID-19 during the COVID-19 pandemic in Alberta.
