= Samuel Hargress II =

American bar owner (1936–2020)

- Born: April 9, 1936; Demopolis, Alabama, U.S.
- Died: April 10, 2020 (aged 84); New York City, U.S.
- Children: Samuel Hargress III, Samantha Hargress
- Website: https://parisbluesharlem.webs.com

Samuel Hargress II (April 9, 1936 – April 10, 2020) was an American bar owner. Hargress was the owner of the Paris Blues, a jazz and blues lounge and bar in Harlem in New York City. It opened in 1969. He was also a civil rights activist.

== Life ==
Samuel Hargress II was born in Demopolis, Alabama, and grew up on a farm. His father was Baptist minister Samuel J. Hargress, and his mother was Katie Hargress. He came from a family that owned a juke joint; he later said his family background in music and entertainment gave him his love for music. His grandfather was a soldier during World War I in a Black infantry unit, the 369th Infantry Regiment (the "Harlem Hell Fighters").

Hargress himself served in the U.S. Army as an MP in France in 1959. After serving in the Army, Hargress went back to Alabama, and became involved in the civil rights struggle. He participated in the Selma to Montgomery marches, along with Martin Luther King Jr., Rosa Parks and others in 1965. He later moved to Harlem, and opened Paris Blues in 1969; the name was inspired by his grandfather's wartime service in France. He spent over 50 years in the nightlife business. He was known in the Harlem community as a philanthropist who funded community block parties and community events.

Hargress was the executive producer of the 2018 short film "Paris Blues in Harlem"; the film was written and directed by Nadhege Ptah. Hargress played a bar patron in the film. His son Samuel Hargress III said about his father "This is what he put his blood, sweat and tears into ... He made the bar almost an extension of himself".

Hargress died on April 10, 2020, a day after his 84th birthday, from COVID-19 during the COVID-19 pandemic in New York City.

== Awards ==
- Mayor Bill De Blasio of New York City awarded Hargress a Key to the City of New York.
