= Hecky Powell =

American businessman, philanthropist, and community leader (1948–2020)

- Born: Harry William Powell; November 6, 1948; Evanston, Illinois, United States
- Died: May 22, 2020 (aged 71)
- Education: Northeastern Illinois University
- Occupations: Restaurateur, businessman
- Known for: Philanthropy and community leadership in Evanston, Illinois
- Spouse: Cheryl Judice

Hecky Powell (November 6, 1948 – May 22, 2020) was an American businessman, philanthropist and community leader from Evanston, Illinois.

== Early life and education ==
Hecky Powell was born to Verna Jenkins Powell, a Creole woman from New Orleans, and Forrest Powell; both were service workers. His given name was Harry William Powell. He grew up in Evanston. Powell earned a degree from Northeastern Illinois University at the University Without Walls.

== Hecky's Barbecue ==
Powell and wife Cheryl Judice opened Hecky's Barbecue in 1983. Their menu takes heavy inspiration from the Creole cooking of Powell's mother and grandmother. Hecky Powell's mother, Verna Powell, worked at the restaurant for 10 years when it was newly opened. Some menu items took their names from Black history, notably the "Juneteenth strawberry soda." The restaurant sells ribs, rib tips, chicken, muffins, sandwiches, fries, soft drinks, and other fast food items. Powell and Judice opened a second location in Lincoln Park in 2004, which closed. The Evanston restaurant closed for repairs following Powell's death in May 2020, and reopened later that same year with Judice as the owner.

The restaurant's motto is "It's the Sauce," referring to a barbecue sauce Hecky used on his cooking. Powell sold this sauce by the bottle.

In 2014, the street corner on which Hecky's Barbecue sits gained the honorary name "Hecky Powell Way."

== Other work ==
Before opening Hecky's Barbecue with his wife, Hecky Powell was an executive director for Neighbors at Work, an Evanston social services program. The program aims to alleviate poverty; some of the services it offers are cheap meals for seniors and food vouchers low-income mothers.

In addition to his restaurant career, Powell participated in local politics. He was the president of the Evanston branch of the NAACP and the former president of the District 65 school board, which covers Evanston and parts of Skokie. In a 2003 discussion on racial identification categories on school forms, Powell said, "In this country, we basically are all mutts anyway." He also said, "In America we’re all mutts. I am a mutt. I am a Creole." Parents complained about the use of the word "mutt" to describe biracial people, especially children. After the incident, Powell decided not to run for school board again.

== Philanthropy ==
Hecky Powell was well known in the Evanston area for offering jobs and free food to Evanstonians, especially young people. In 2014, Powell received a key to the city for his work with young adults. He also incentivized drug addicts to stay clean by paying them to attend rehab meetings.

In 1994, Hecky Powell founded the Forrest E. Powell foundation, named for his father. The foundation provides scholarships and grants to high school students, especially those looking to work in the trades. His philanthropy focused on young people in the Evanston area. Former Evanston mayor Steve Haggerty said, "[Powell's] work to support our youth was unparalleled."

Later, in 2017, Powell co-founded the Evanston Work Ethic (WE) program as a subset of the Forrest E. Powell foundation. The WE program works with students at ETHS, the local public high school. WE provides students with paid internships, soft-skills workshops, career exploration opportunities, and mentors in their fields of interest.

== Personal life and death ==
Powell's wife, Cheryl Judice, is a sociologist and professor. They have multiple children.

He died from COVID-19 complications on May 22, 2020, at age 71, amid the COVID-19 pandemic in Illinois.
