= Theodore Lambrinos =

Greek-American operatic baritone (1935–2021)

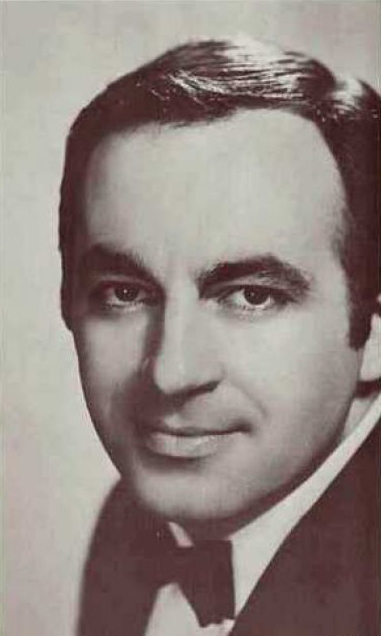
- Theodore Lambrinos
- Born: 25 July 1935; Brooklyn, New York, U.S.
- Died: 29 March 2021 (aged 85); Brooklyn, New York, U.S.
- Occupation: Opera singer (baritone)
- Years active: 1958–2017
- Spouses: Parthena Karipides (m. 1961; died 1992); Hallie Neill (m. 1999)
- Children: 2

Theodore Lambrinos (25 July 1935 – 29 March 2021) was an American baritone opera singer known for his performance of Rigoletto and other works by Giuseppe Verdi.

== Early life and musical training ==
Lambrinos was born in Brooklyn to Greek immigrant parents. His father became the Greek featherweight champion, with 80 fights in New York City. While working in his father's furniture refinishing business after high school, Lambrinos joined a Greek church choir. He was encouraged to study voice and after one lesson, had his first audition for the Russian Don Cossack Choir. He was hired on the spot to tour the country singing twenty Russian songs. Lambrinos immediately took the subway from Brooklyn to Manhattan, burst into the Russian Tea Room and asked the waiters to phonetically teach him the Russian words. He subsequently toured throughout the USA and performed in Broadway, off-Broadway and summer stock productions.

Anton Coppola changed the course of Lambrinos' career when, after hearing him sing, told him, “You should be in opera!” Lambrinos began listening to recordings of the great opera singers. With only three arias learned, he sang for the Metropolitan Opera Auditions and won a spot in the finals onstage, winning the Gladys Axman Taylor award. His big break occurred during the 1966 Met National Company tour, when impresario Rudolf Bing hired him. Lambrinos made his 1968 debut as the Herald in Wagner's Lohengrin.

While on tour with the Met National Company, singing different operas every night around the country, Lambrinos was relaxing with colleagues when he was suddenly pushed into a swimming pool, in a prank by another singer. He experienced a violent reaction to the chlorine which caused a gradual loss of his voice. He did not renew his contract which infuriated Rudolph Bing, who argued that Lambrinos had a great future at the Met. But after diagnosis and treatment for severe chlorine allergic reaction, Lambrinos quietly bowed out, hopeful that in time he could reclaim his vocal health. He and his wife Parthena left music and took a different livelihood, gradually bringing his voice back, note by note. Five years later, he returned to the stage in La Boheme with the New York Grand Opera, and his opera career resumed. In 1992, Lambrinos was hired for a second contract at the Metropolitan Opera at age 57.

== Career ==
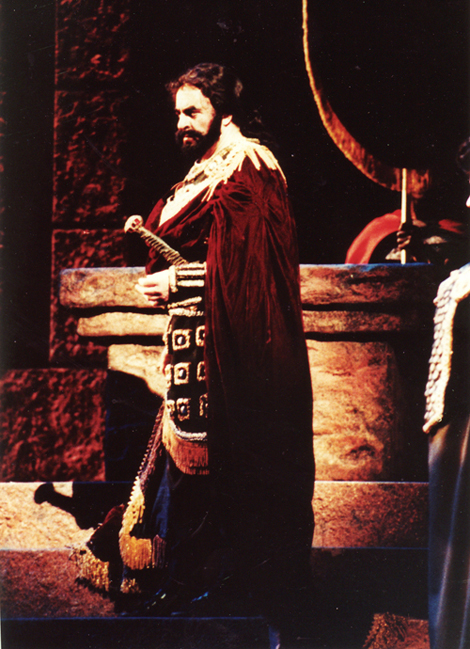
Lambrinos in "Nabucco"

Lambrinos sang over 60 major baritone roles in his career internationally and with the Metropolitan Opera in productions including Stiffelio, Rigoletto and Aida. He sang nearly 200 performances of Rigoletto, Nabucco, Il trovatore, Cavalleria rusticana and Pagliacci, Aida and Tosca with the European touring company Teatro Lirico d'Europa throughout Europe and the US. His performances took him from the Middle East to the Far East including Beijing, China; and he sang with Plácido Domingo, Renée Fleming and Franco Corelli. Rigoletto was one of his most popular roles. "Lambrinos sang the part of Rigoletto with the confidence of someone who has appeared in the role on the stage of the Met. He used the full range of his rich baritone voice to shape a convincing character performance, moving from bitter sarcasm in the court scenes, to the most tender love for his daughter, before his final fall into despair. Lambrinos was particularly effective in conveying the lightning-quick shifts of mood in his aria 'Pari siamo'." For Opera Tampa, he created the role of Carlo Tresca in the world premiere of Anton Coppola's Sacco and Vanzetti.

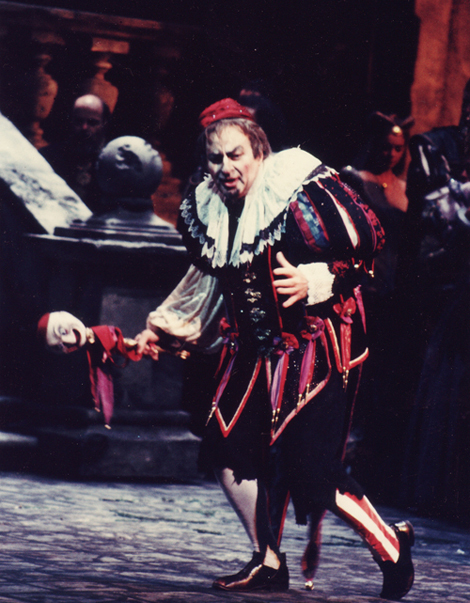
Lambrinos in Rigoletto

Lambrinos additionally traveled with the Ambassadors of Opera as part of a quartet performing opera to Broadway concerts to over 20 countries including command performances for Indira Gandhi in India, and for Queen Sirikit, Bangkok, Thailand, for Imelda Marcos in Manila, Philippines, and for sheiks, emirs and princesses in Bahrain, Dubai, Kuwait, Abu Dhabi and in all of the Arab Emirates, Pakistan, Malaysia, Indonesia and Cairo.

Lambrinos also sang with the New York Grand Opera Company, which under its founding director Vincent La Selva presented free staged operas in Central Park. The New York Times critic Tim Page reviewed Lambrinos's 1983 performance of the title role in Nabucco at the Naumberg Bandshell, noting that his portrayal “proved that there is a place for refinement and elegance in the world of early Verdi.”

In an interview with Opera News, Lambrinos described singing 21 performances of Scarpia in 26 days while on tour, and why he preferred touring. "I just want to sing. I have got my voice all lined up and I want to use it."

His Rigoletto was the historical first performance of opera in Hanoi, Vietnam.

== Hellenic Songs ==
In honor of his Greek heritage, Lambrinos presented "A Tribute to the Hellenic Spirit" at Avery Fisher Hall in Lincoln Center, offering a special tribute to the Greek Metropolitan opera basso, Nicolo Moscona. He frequently sang in Greek Orthodox churches and released the album Theodore Lambrinos Sings Hellenic Songs.

In his unpublished memoirs, Lambrinos wrote: ”I had always dreamed of presenting a program of Hellenic songs after searching through many, many hundreds of old torn up music sheets until I found pure gems. When the Hellene composers left for Italy to study with the great masters during the Ottoman occupation of Greece in the late 1800’s, they returned with this nearly forgotten legacy of beautiful classical melodies and heartbreaking stories. I have always believed that if the public heard these beautiful Hellenic songs, as much as the Italian Neapolitan songs, they would have been just as popular. In May 1999 my dreams were realized. I produced “Tribute to the Hellenic Spirit” with Anton Coppola conducting at Avery Fisher Hall, Lincoln Center. Standing ovation with many new fans of these unique songs. My hope today is that the heritage of these classical songs will not be lost but preserved for future generations.”

== Personal life ==
His first wife, Parthena Karipides, was his manager. When she fell ill with ALS, Lambrinos cared for her while juggling his singing career and supporting his family. They had two children, daughter Kari and son Ted. Parthena died in 1992.

He met his second wife, soprano Hallie Neill, in Cairo when they sang together in Carmen. They married in 1999.

== Later years ==
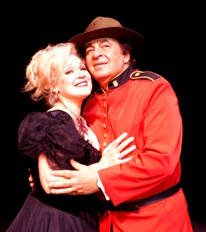
With wife Hallie Neill in A Scandalous Affair

During the last 18 years of his career, Lambrinos toured in operas and performances, often with his wife, Hallie Neill. They sang in opera/Broadway concerts around the world, and in Neill's original operetta, A Scandalous Affair, which was favorably reviewed. "Neill and Lambrinos are well matched both vocally and as actors. The couple, married in real life, bring a delightful chemistry to the stage...Audiences may remember Lambrinos as a commanding Rigoletto when the Jefferson Performing Arts Society presented its first full operatic production more than a decade ago. His voice remains powerfully solid and rich in operatic arias, such as "Nemico dell patria" from "Andrea Chenier," and the Nelson Eddy trademark, "Stouthearted Men." The delight of A Scandalous Affair comes in hearing two splendid singers tackling a catalog of classic songs." The CD of this musical was featured on the 50th Annual Grammy Awards first ballot in the category of "Best Musical Show Album". Another of their shows together was The Diva and the Baritone – Cole Porter to Puccini, also well-reviewed.

Lambrinos also taught at his New York City vocal studio the technique which had sustained his 60-year career right through to his last recording at age 83. He maintained an active voice studio until the COVID-19 pandemic, coaching tenors, baritones and basses.

== Death ==
Lambrinos continued singing into 2021; age had never affected his voice. In February 2021, he and his wife Hallie sang their last duet, “Sweethearts”, singing the high A-flat together, holding it as long as possible. A month later, he was hospitalized for a non-life threatening condition but contacted COVID-19 viral pneumonia while there. When advised by a hospital physician that he would likely not make it back home, Lambrinos called his wife to say goodbye.

He died from complications of COVID-19 at the age of 85.
