= Donald Perry Polsky =

American architect (1928–2021)

- Born: September 30, 1928; Milwaukee, Wisconsin, U.S.
- Died: January 3, 2021 (aged 92); Berkeley, California, U.S.

Donald Perry Polsky FAIA (September 30, 1928 – January 3, 2021) was an American architect noted for his mid-century modern style. He brought California modern style to the Midwest. Polsky is also credited with being a pioneer of the design-build concept.

== Life and work ==
Polsky was born on September 30, 1928, in Milwaukee, Wisconsin, and grew up in Lincoln, Nebraska. He graduated from the University of Nebraska College of Engineering and Architecture (now College of Architecture) with a BA in 1951.

Polsky served in the United States Air Force from 1951 to 1953. Upon discharge, he wished to work for the best practicing architect in the world. From 1953 to 1956, Polsky served as job captain for the renowned Richard Neutra.

In 1956, Polsky started his own firm. In 1962, his design for the Oceano Apartments in Santa Barbara, California, won honorable mention award from the AIA, Life and House & Home magazines.

In 2002, he was awarded the Harry F. Cunningham Gold Medal for Architectural Excellence in the State of Nebraska from the Nebraska Chapter of the American Institute of Architects. The following year, Polsky was elevated to fellowship in the AIA, one of the highest honors bestowed upon architects, as fewer than 2% of those registered with the AIA attain the rank.

In 2014, Polsky was awarded the Distinguished Alumni Award for Excellence in Architecture by the University of Nebraska College of Architecture.

He died from COVID-19 and pneumonia during the COVID-19 pandemic in California.
