= Rhoda Hatch =

- Born: Rhoda Jean Hatch; July 26, 1946; Chicago, Illinois, U.S.
- Died: April 4, 2020 (aged 73); Chicago, Illinois, U.S.
- Occupations: Anti-war activist and public school educator
- Known for: One of the first one hundred deaths of the COVID-19 pandemic in Chicago, Illinois

Rhoda Jean Hatch (July 26, 1946 – April 4, 2020) was an American anti-war activist and public school educator who became one of the first one hundred deaths of the COVID-19 pandemic in Chicago, Illinois, in the United States.

Described as "a trailblazer" by USA Today, she was also:

"The first to move out of the home. The first to graduate from college. The first to go to Africa. A scholar. An anti-war activist. A lifelong public school teacher. An avid Scrabble player and the church organist."

== Formative years and family ==
Born in Chicago, Illinois, on July 26, 1946, Rhoda Jean Hatch was a daughter of Elijah J. Hatch (1906-1981) and Helen Holmes (Jackson) Hatch (1924-1967). During the 1950s, her father worked as a livestock handler at a stockyard in the Chicago area. Raised in a public housing project in Chicago, Hatch was the eldest of eight children. At the age of twenty-one, she became her family's matriarch when her mother died, leaving their father to raise a two-year-old and several other younger children. Her father then died in 1981.

Hatch was the older sister of Jennie Hatch, Josephine Hatch and the Rev. Marshall Hatch, the pastor of the New Mount Pilgrim Missionary Baptist Church in Chicago's West Garfield Park neighborhood.

== Teaching career and activism ==
Following her graduation from college, Hatch secured a teaching position with the city of Chicago's public school system. She taught for twenty years before retiring.

During the early 1990s, Hatch worked with her brother and other members of their church and community to plan and implement a series of peace and social justice initiatives, including a housing program for single mothers who were recovering from substance abuse and an anti-war campaign against Operation Desert Storm.

== Final years, illness and death ==
Hatch "lived in a four-unit building [in Chicago] occupied exclusively by family members," according to a May 2020 report by USA Today. In March 2020, she began having breathing difficulties, which she attributed to asthma. Hospitalized shortly before Easter when her condition worsened, she was diagnosed with COVID-19 and subsequently intubated, but died from that disease on April 4. She was seventy-three years old.

== See also ==
- List of peace activists
