= Julius Schachter =

American microbiologist (1936–2020)

Julius Schachter (June 1, 1936 – December 20, 2020) was an American microbiologist at the University of California, San Francisco. He was a leading expert on Chlamydia.

== Early life and education ==
Schachter was born in the Bronx, to parents Sam and Mary (Kudisch). His father was a furrier and his mother was a clerk at the New York State Department of Motor Vehicles.

He received his bachelor's degree in chemistry from Columbia University in 1957, his master's degree in physiology from Hunter College in 1960 and his PhD in bacteriology from the University of California, Berkeley, in 1965.

== Personal life and death ==
Schachter was married to Joyce Poynter from 1962 until her death in 1990. He remarried Dr. Elisabeth Scheer in 2018. In 1986, while traveling with his family, Schachter used a pocketknife to release oxygen masks that had not deployed during the TWA Flight 840 bombing.

He died from COVID-19 in San Francisco on December 20, 2020, at the age of 84, during the COVID-19 pandemic in the San Francisco Bay Area.

== Selected publications ==
- Schachter J, Chow JM, Howard H, et al. Detection of Chlamydia trachomatis by nucleic acid amplification testing: our evaluation suggests that CDC-recommended approaches for confirmatory testing are ill-advised. J Clin Micro. 2006; 44(7): 2512–7.
- Chernesky MA, Hook EW 3rd, Martin DH, et al. Women find it easy and prefer to collect their own vaginal swabs to diagnose Chlamydia trachomatis or Neisseria gonorrhoeae infections. Sex Transm Dis. 2005; 32: 729–33.
- Schachter J, Chernesky MA, Willis DE, et al. Vaginal swabs are the specimens of choice when screening for Chlamydia trachomatis and Neisseria gonorrhoeae: results from a multicenter evaluation of the APTIMA assays for both infections. Sex Transm Dis. 2005; 32: 725–8.
- Spaargaren J, Schachter J, Moncada J, et al. Slow epidemic of lymphogranuloma venereum L2b strain. Emerg Infect Dis. 2005; 11: 1787–8.
- Schachter J, Hook III EW, Martin DH, et al. Confirming positive results of nucleic acid amplification tests (NAATs) for Chlamydia trachomatis: all NAATs are not created equal. J Clin Microbiol. 2005; 43: 1372–3.
