= Brahm Kanchibhotla =

Indian-American journalist (1953–2020)

Brahmanandam Kanchibhotla
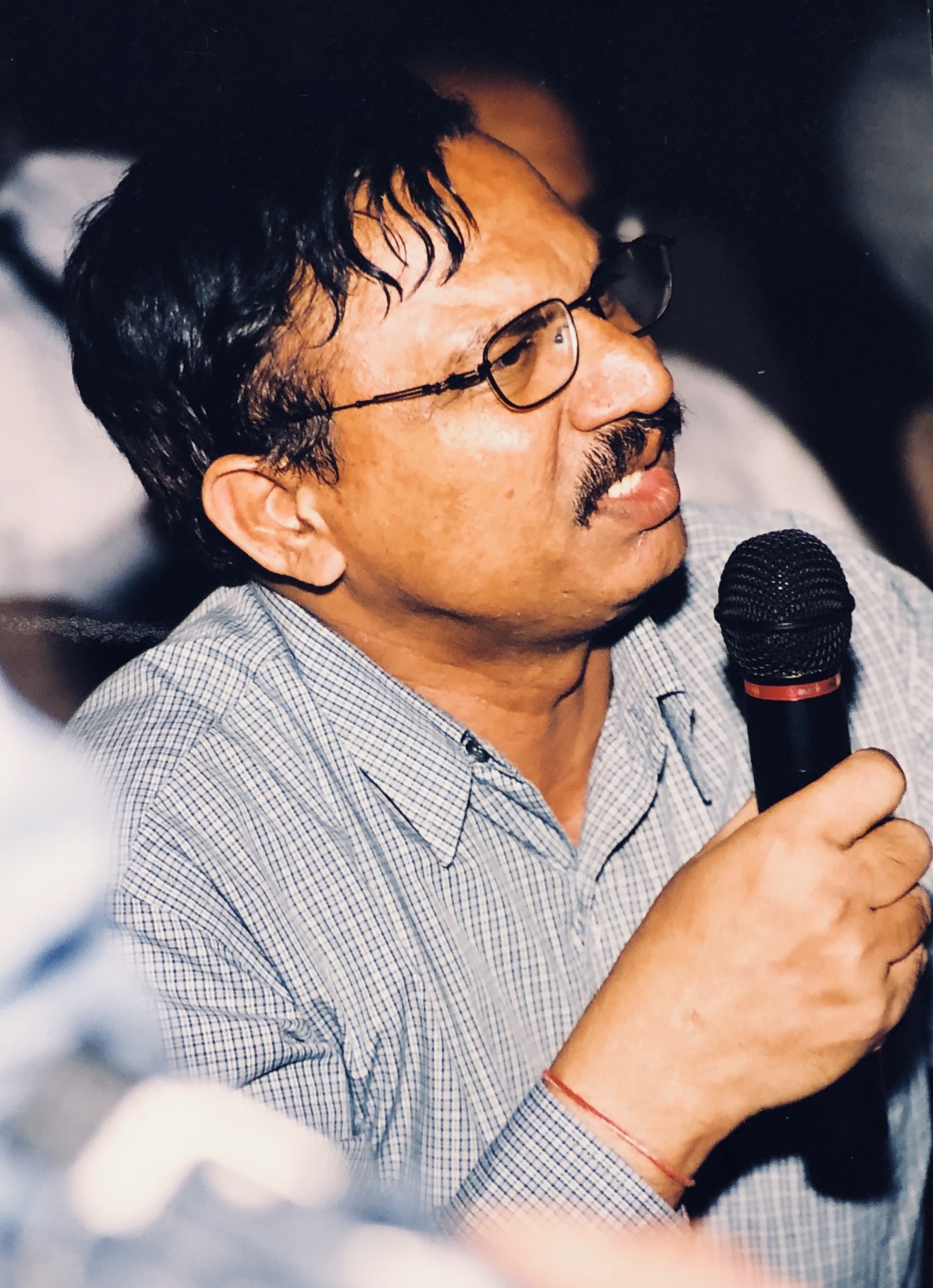
- Born: 1953; Edubadu, Andhra Pradesh, India
- Died: 6 April 2020 (age 66); Nassau County, New York
- Citizenship: Indian
- Occupation: Journalist
- Spouse: Anjana Kanchibhotla
- Children: Sudama Kanchibhotla; Srujana Kanchibhotla

Brahmanandam "Brahm" Kanchibhotla (1953 – 6 April 2020) was an Indian-American journalist known for his extensive writings on the development of the Telugu community in the USA. He was a writer for India Abroad, News-India Times, United News of India, and The Indian Panorama, among others.

== Life and career ==
Brahm Kanchibhotla was born in Edubadu village of Parchur Mandal in the Prakasam district of Andhra Pradesh, India.

In 1992, Kanchibhotla came to the United States working as Business Editor for the News-India Times, handling front-page articles while also reporting on financial news. He later moved to India Weekly USA followed by The Urban Indian, both New York-based publications for the South Asian community. His work as a writer involved work on tiger conservation, restaurant workers, small businesses, and environmentalists' reactions to the early 2000s Bush budget.

Kanchibhotla is most-known in the South Asian community for when he was Senior Correspondent at the United News of India (UNI) news wire. In his half-decade stay there, he wrote about New York City's economy and its ethnic communities as well as international news focusing on the United Nations.

== Death and legacy ==
On 28 March 2020, Brahm Kanchibhotla was admitted to the hospital after having shown COVID-19 symptoms for the past 5 days. He died from COVID-19 complications 9 days later on 6 April. He was 66 years old.

As Kanchibhotla was also the first Indian journalist to die from the virus, his death sent ripples through the Indian and journalism communities. Indian Prime Minister Narendra Modi, Vice-President of India Venkaiah Naidu, Indian Ambassador to the US Taranjit Singh Sandhu, and Chief Minister of Andhra Pradesh Y.S. Jaganmohan Reddy all gave their condolences. US President Donald Trump also gave remarks to the journalist's death.

When speaking on Kanchibhotla's legacy, Prime Minister Modi commended the journalist for his "fine work and efforts to bring India and USA closer."

Kanchibhotla is survived by his wife Anjana and children, Sudama and Srujana.

In December 2020, the Brahm Kanchibhotla Scholarship was begun at Kanchibhotla's alma mater of Baruch College.
