= Mary J. Wilson =

First African-American senior zookeeper at the Maryland Zoo (1937–2020)

Mary Jeannette Wilson
- Born: January 2, 1937; Baltimore, Maryland, U.S.
- Died: May 25, 2020 (aged 83); Randallstown, Maryland, U.S.
- Education: Paul Laurence Dunbar High School
- Occupation: Zookeeper
- Employer: Maryland Zoo
- Known for: First Black senior zookeeper in Baltimore

Mary Jeannette Wilson (January 2, 1937 – May 25, 2020) was the first African-American senior zookeeper at the Maryland Zoo in Baltimore.

== Early life ==
Mary J. Wilson was born in West Baltimore, Maryland. She had two siblings, one older and one younger. Her parents were Willie Wilson and Mary Henry. Her mother Mary died of diphtheria when Wilson was only five years old. She graduated from Paul Laurence Dunbar High School.

== Career ==
Wilson began working at the then Baltimore Zoo in 1961. She was hired by Arthur R. Watson, who was head of the zoo from 1948 until 1980. While most women zookeepers at the time were assigned to work with smaller animals, Wilson worked with mammals from the beginning of her career, specializing in gorillas, cats and elephants. She was known for bringing home baby animals to care for them. She retired in 1999 after working 38 years at the zoo. The zoo still has two otters named after her: Mary and Wilson.

== Health and death ==
In July 2019, Wilson began to show signs of Alzheimer's disease.

On April 1, 2020, she moved to Genesis Healthcare Patapsco Valley Center in Randallstown, Maryland. On May 4, 2020, she was diagnosed with COVID-19 during the COVID-19 pandemic in Maryland, and was admitted to Northwest Hospital on May 8. She died on May 25 after being unresponsive for 14 days. She was survived by her daughter, Sharron Wilson Jackson, who was the first African-American female senior zookeeper at the Henry Doorly Zoo and Aquarium, in Omaha, Nebraska, and by a grandson, Felipe Herrara.
