= Nina Popova =

Russian-American ballet dancer (1922–2020)

- Born: October 20, 1922; Novorossiysk, Russian SFSR
- Died: August 7, 2020 (aged 97); St. Augustine, Florida, US
- Occupation: Ballet dancer

Nina Popova (October 20, 1922 – August 7, 2020) was a Russian and American ballet dancer.

== Biography ==
Popova was born in Novorossiysk, Russia. Her family left for Paris shortly after her birth. She studied ballet with other White Russian émigrés and, as a teenager, performed with Lyubov Yegorova's Ballet de la Jeunesse. In the late 1930s she performed with the Original Ballet Russe in Australia and Cuba. In 1939, she joined the Ballet Theatre, now called the American Ballet Theatre, in New York. Popova danced with the Ballet Russe de Monte Carlo from 1943 to 1945. She performed on the television program Your Show of Shows and on Broadway.

From 1954 to 1967, Popova taught at New York's High School of Performing Arts. From 1967 to 1975 she was the Artistic Director of the Houston Ballet, where she established a professional dance company.

Popova died from COVID-19 complications in St. Augustine, Florida, during the COVID-19 pandemic in Florida.
