= Mo Pinel =

American mechanical engineer, product designer, and bowler (1942–2021)

- Born: Maurice Louis Pinel Jr; 1942; Long Island, New York, U.S.
- Died: March 5, 2021 (aged 78); Baton Rouge, Louisiana, U.S.
- Education: Cornell University
- Occupations: Mechanical engineer, product designer
- Spouse: 3
- Children: 3

Maurice Louis Pinel Jr (1942 – March 5, 2021) was an American mechanical engineer, product designer and bowler. He is known for changing the game of ten-pin bowling with his innovative bowling ball designs, notably using asymmetric core masses which allowed the ball to curve more aggressively in its path down the lane.

Pinel's popular ball designs starting in 1991 helped bowlers achieve higher scores, and thus contributed to the "score inflation" controversy of the 2000s.

== Early life and education ==
Pinel was born on Long Island New York in 1942.

His father, Maurice Sr., attended Columbia University and was an engineer and instructor of metallurgy who returned to college for a law degree and graduated cum laude from Brooklyn Law School in 1943, subsequently working as a patent attorney in metallurgy.

Pinel attended Cornell University and studied chemical engineering. He stayed in Ithaca to pursue drag racing and tennis.

== Career ==
Pinel twice suffered serious injuries in drag racing, so he left motorsports and took up competitive bowling in 1969. He experimented with adding weights inside bowling balls, and in 1973 he presented his ideas to bowling ball manufacturers, who were not interested. Pinel was in another car crash, and he stopped competing to focus on the business side. He coached bowlers, he co-owned a lane resurfacing company, and he operated a bowling alley in Rome, New York. He wrote a book on bowling: The See It, Feel It, Do It System!

In the late 1980s, Pinel hit upon the idea of using asymmetrical masses inside a bowling ball. The intention was that the ball could be thrown in a way that gave it a greater change of trajectory in the middle part of the ball's travel, so that it curved more sharply into the pins at the end. He filed a patent in April 1990: U.S. patent 5,037,096.

Pinel teamed with Phil Cardinale of Track, a small bowling ball maker, to create a new asymmetric-mass ball called the Shark in 1991. The Track Shark showed so much promise that AMF Bowling, a large bowling equipment company, hired Pinel away from Track. For AMF, Pinel formed a new eccentric mass to create the AMF Sumo model in 1992. The Sumo sold so well that AMF gave Pinel a commemorative medallion when sales reached 100,000 balls. But AMF had assigned Pinel a royalty for each ball, and they felt he was getting too much money. AMF severed the contract in 1995, after which Pinel was quickly hired by Faball, known for the popular Hammer model with polyurethane technology. Pinel designed an asymmetric core to start Faball's Hammer 3D Offset line. The new ball proved so popular that Faball's manufacturing side struggled to meet high customer demand. Faball was suddenly enjoying about $12 million in annual sales while AMF fell from $12 million to $1 million.

In 1999, Pinel and his lane-resurfacing partner Rich Sadles teamed in a new venture: MoRich, based in Virginia. MoRich was formed to produce bowling balls with even more radically eccentric masses. But other, more well-known bowling ball manufacturers were now offering similar models, and they were better positioned to influence the market. Pinel exhausted his capital trying to keep MoRich competitive, finally closing the doors in 2011.

Phil Cardinale became the head of Radical Bowling, a boutique brand owned by Brunswick. Brunswick and Cardinale hired Pinel as director of technology, and to serve as brand ambassador. Pinel and Radical produced a series of videos for YouTube, and Pinel drove around the US in his car, coaching players and promoting Radical's ball designs. His final assignment for Radical was a multi-state tour of the Deep South in 2021, to tell bowlers about the physics of the game.

== Personal life and death ==
Pinel died from complications of COVID-19 in Baton Rouge on March 5, 2021, after conducting bowling seminars in Florida and Louisiana. His wife and one of his three sons were with him. He was 78.
