= Motoko Fujishiro Huthwaite =

American preservationist (1927–2020)

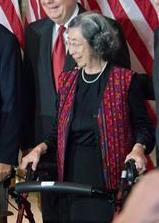
- Born: August 24, 1927; Boston
- Died: May 4, 2020; Taylor
- Education: University of South Carolina, Wayne State University, Radcliffe College
- Occupations: Researcher, teacher
- Employers: American School in Japan (1955–1964); Wayne State University
- Awards: Congressional Gold Medal (2015)

Motoko Fujishiro Huthwaite (born Motoko Fujishiro, August 24, 1927 – May 4, 2020) was an American teacher. She served during World War II with the Monuments, Fine Arts, and Archives program.

In 2015, she was awarded the Congressional Gold Medal in a Washington, D.C., ceremony alongside Harry Ettlinger, another Monuments Man. Fujishiro Huthwaite also worked closely with the Monuments Men Foundation for the Preservation of Art and its founder Robert M. Edsel to continue the mission of the MFAA.

== Life ==
Huthwaite was born in Boston. She graduated from Radcliffe College, the University of South Carolina, and Wayne State University. In 1941, she was sent to Japan as an exchange of nationals and was unable to get out of Japan after the outbreak of World War II. In 1945, she was recruited by Langdon Warner for the Japan division of the Monuments, Fine Arts, and Archives program, working under George L. Stout. After returning to Japan in 1952, Huthwaite served as John D. Rockefeller III’s personal secretary during his visits to the country. She later taught at the American School in Japan. She died from COVID-19 during the COVID-19 pandemic in Michigan in 2020.
