= Winfield Parker =

American soul and gospel singer-songwriter

- Born: Winfield Albert Parker; June 21, 1942; Cooksville, Maryland, U.S.
- Died: January 18, 2021 (aged 78) Columbia, Maryland, U.S.
- Genres: Soul, R&B, gospel
- Occupations: Singer, songwriter, saxophonist
- Years active: 1960s–2010s
- Labels: Ru-Jac, Arctic, Wand, Spring, GSF, Little Star, P&L

Winfield Albert Parker (June 21, 1942 – January 18, 2021) was an American soul and gospel singer-songwriter and saxophonist based in Baltimore who was known for his 1971 R&B song "S.O.S. (Stop Her on Sight)".

== Early life ==
Winfield Parker was born on June 21, 1942, in Cooksville, Maryland. At the age of 16, he took up the saxophone.

== Career ==
Parker began recording in the 1960s and performed on stage with artists such as Little Richard, Otis Redding, and Ike & Tina Turner.

In 1971, Parker released a cover of Edwin Starr's "S.O.S. (Stop Her on Sight)," which became his only nationally charting single, reaching number 48 on the Billboard R&B chart. He continued to perform soul music for the rest of his career, even after shifting focus to gospel music.

== Personal life and legacy ==
In 2013, he received the Gold Mic Award from the Global Entertainment Media Association for his work on soul and gospel music.

Parker became an ordained minister in 1981. He died from complications of COVID-19 on January 18, 2021, at Gilchrist Center in Columbia, Maryland, at the age of 78.

== Discography ==
=== Studio albums ===
- Mr. Clean (GSF, 1972)
- Winfield Parker (Little Star, 1988)
- I Want to Be Loved (P&L Records, gospel, 2000s)
- He's Able (P&L Records, gospel, 2000s)

=== Selected singles ===
- "Shake That Thing" / "Brand New Start" (Arctic, 1969)
- "I'm Wondering" / "Barbara" (Wand, 1970)
- "S.O.S. (Stop Her on Sight)" / "I'm on My Way" (Spring, 1971)
- "Mr. Clean" / "I Love You Just the Same" (GSF, 1972)

=== Charted single ===
Year	Title	Chart (U.S. R&B)	Peak position
1971	"S.O.S. (Stop Her on Sight)"	Billboard R&B	48
