= Jean Lau Chin =

American clinical psychologist (1944–2020)

- Born: July 27, 1944
- Died: May 13, 2020 (aged 75)
- Citizenship: United States
- Occupation: Professor of Psychology
- Spouse: Gene Chin
- Awards: AAPA Distinguished Contribution Award (2001); Society for the Psychological Study of Culture, Ethnicity and Race Award for Distinguished Career Contributions to Service (2019)

Academic background
- Education: Brooklyn College, CUNY; Teachers College, Columbia University

Jean Lau Chin (July 27, 1944 – May 13, 2020) was an American psychologist known for her work on diversity in leadership, cultural competence in mental health care, and women's issues and feminism. She was Professor of Psychology and former Dean of the Gordon F. Derner School of Psychology at Adelphi University. Chin was the first Asian American psychologist to be licensed in Massachusetts.

Chin served as 2003 President of the Society for the Psychology of Women, American Psychological Association [APA], Division 35. In 2020, the Society for the Psychology of Women established the Jean Lau Chin Early Career Professional Award to recognize the contributions of Asian Pacific American feminists to leadership, academic scholarship, and community practice.

== Biography ==
Chin was born on July 27, 1944, in Brooklyn, NY. When Chin was younger, she worked at her family’s laundry service called Louis Tong Hand Laundry in Brooklyn, New York. Chin received a Bachelor of Science degree in psychology at Brooklyn College in 1966. She attended graduate school at Teachers College, Columbia University where she obtained a Master of Arts in psychology in 1969 and a Doctorate of Education (EdD) in psychology in 1974. Her doctoral thesis was titled The development of basic relational concepts in educable mentally retarded children. After graduating, Chin worked as Chief Psychologist at the Douglas A. Thorn Clinic for Children in Boston, MA where her research focused on the impact of cognitive tutoring as a form mental health service for children with learning disabilities.

She served as Dean of the Gordon F. Derner School of Psychology at Adelphi University from 2006 to 2010. Chin completed a project on women and leadership for the Gender Studies Program at Chinese University of Hong Kong (CUHK) through the Fulbright Program. The Gender Studies Program promotes gender equality and educates people about women’s issues and diverse leadership.

Chin was the wife of Gene Chin and the mother of Stephen and Scott Chin. Chin died on May 13, 2020, from complications of COVID-19; she was preceded in death by her husband who also died from COVID-19. After the Chins died, a charity was created, named the Dr. Jean Lau Chin and Gene S. Chin Memorial Fund, which is dedicated to Chin and her husband. The donations from the charity will fund medical research, provide money for scholarships to female and minority groups, and support Asian-American and minority youth organizations.

== Research ==
Chin's research focused on the topic of diversity in leadership and its impact on people in society. Chin co-authored a book (with Joseph E. Trimble) titled Diversity and Leadership which addressed the importance of multiculturalism in leadership in the context of rapid growth of globalization, which has led to increasingly diverse organizations, institutions, and societies. She edited the volume Women and Leadership: Transforming Visions and Diverse Voices which described the concept of feminism, the value of women as leaders, and the challenges women in leadership positions encounter in society. Chin edited the Special Issue on Diversity and Leadership in the American Psychologist, where she discussed the need for leadership to include people of different ethnic backgrounds to establish equality and change the norms of society. In other work, Chin reported on 2013 Leadership Diversity Summit, sponsored by the American Psychological Association, which identified necessary competencies for becoming an effective leader in an increasingly diverse society. These included leveraging personal and social identities, utilizing a global and diverse mindset, leveraging community and organizational contexts, and promoting a diversity-supportive and inclusive climate.

Her autobiographical book Learning from My Mother's Voice: Family Legend and the Chinese American Experience illustrated the life of an Asian-American mother and daughter who encountered difficulties in adapting to the norms of a new society. The book emphasized clinical applications of family narratives as a method of understanding a person's lived experience. Chin has also researched inequality and cultural competency in the context of healthcare. Her report Culturally Competent Health Care explained how minority groups such as Hispanics and Asian Americans may be limited in their access to high quality health care due to language barriers, and how minorities such as low income immigrants may be delayed access to health care providers due to financial issues. Chin argued that health care systems should be more integrated and offer special programs and services to better serve minority communities.

== Awards ==
Chin received the Distinguished Contribution Award from the Asian American Psychological Association (AAPA) in 2001 and Distinguished Career Contributions to Service Award from the Society for the Psychological Study of Culture, Ethnicity and Race (APA, Division 45) in 2019.

Other awards include the Outstanding Executive Director Award from the Massachusetts League of Community Health Centers and the Women Who Care Award from Women in Philanthropy, both given in 1991. Chin was recognized by the YMCA Academy of Women Achievers in 2003 and received the Nassau County Executive's Women of Distinction Award in 2009. She received the New York State Psychological Association's (NYSPA) Diversity Award and Margaret Floy Washburn Award in 2013.

== Books ==
- Chin, J. L. (Ed.). (2004). The psychology of prejudice and discrimination. ABC-CLIO.
- Chin, J. L. (2005). Learning from my mother's voice: The family legend and the Chinese American experience. Teachers College Press.
- Chin, J. L., De La Cancela, V., & Jenkins, Y. M. (1993). Diversity in psychotherapy: The politics of race, ethnicity, and gender. Greenwood Publishing Group.
- Chin, J. L., Hong, G. K., Liem, J. H., Ham, M. A. D. C., & Ham, F. M. (1993). Transference and empathy in Asian American psychotherapy: Cultural values and treatment needs. Greenwood Publishing Group.
- Chin, J. L., Lott, B., Rice, J., & Sanchez-Hucles, J. (Eds.). (2007). Women and leadership: Transforming visions and diverse voices. John Wiley & Sons.
- Chin, J. L., & Trimble, J. E. (2014). Diversity and Leadership. Sage Publications.
- De La Cancela, V., Chin, J. L., & Jenkins, Y. M. (1998). Community health psychology: Empowerment for diverse communities. Psychology Press.

== Representative Publications ==
- Barrett, S. E., Chin, J. L., Diaz, L. C., Espin, O., Greene, B., & McGoldrick, M. (2005). Multicultural feminist therapy: Theory in context. Women & Therapy, 28(3-4), 27-61.
- Chin, J. L. (2000). Culturally competent health care. Public Health Reports, 115(1), 25-33.
- Chin, J. L. (2010). Introduction to the Special Issue on Diversity and Leadership. American Psychologist, 65(3), 150-156.
- Chin, J. L., Desormeaux, L., & Sawyer, K. (2016). Making way for paradigms of diversity leadership. Consulting Psychology Journal: Practice and Research, 68 (1), 49-71.
- Eagly, A. H., & Chin, J. L. (2010). Diversity and leadership in a changing world. American Psychologist, 65(3), 216-224.
