= Ray Rayburn =

American audio engineer, author, and standards analyst (1948–2021)

- Born: August 21, 1948; New York City, U.S.
- Died: January 31, 2021 (aged 72); Arlington, Texas, U.S.
- Education: New York Institute of Technology
- Occupations: Audio engineer, author, standards expert
- Employer(s): Christian Broadcasting Network, A & R Recording, RCA, Broadway Video, Cirrus Logic

Ray Arthur Rayburn (August 21, 1948 – January 31, 2021) was an American audio engineer, author and standards analyst who co-developed nine audio standards with the Audio Engineering Society (AES), including CobraNet for digital audio. Rayburn was noted for sound system installations in churches, but he was also well known for radio and television studio engineering, upgrading Saturday Night Live to stereophonic sound in 1984. During 1992–94, Rayburn redesigned the sound system in the United States Senate chamber, implementing the world's first fully digital audio system based on digital signal processing. Rayburn contributed chapters for Glen Ballou's audio engineering textbook, and for John M. Eargle's The Microphone Book (2001).

In 2009, the AES honored Rayburn with the Fellowship Award. He was an emeritus member of the Acoustical Society of America.

== Career ==
Rayburn attended New York Institute of Technology from 1966 to 1970, studying applied science and engineering. His first job after leaving college was in Ithaca, New York, with the Christian Broadcasting Network (CBN). Rayburn built the radio station's studios, and he engineered The Scott Ross Show, an interview-style program by CBN reporter Scott Ross, which won Billboard's award for best syndicated radio program. CBN was nearly bankrupt and unable to pay Rayburn, so he returned to New York City to work for Telectro, a tape recorder manufacturer. At the first opportunity, he shifted to work in a large recording studio complex: Sonart / db Studios in Chicago, founded by Chuck Lishon and Hans Wurman. On the side, Rayburn helped the Christian Resurrection Band with their sound, befriending many members of Jesus People USA.

Rayburn returned to New York to work for A & R Recording under chief engineer Irv Joel. Rayburn was hired by RCA for remote recording assignments, including several symphonies and a 1977 Halloween performance by Frank Zappa. Rayburn also maintained gear for Electric Lady Studios. Phil Ramone recommended Rayburn to Lorne Michaels, and Michaels hired Rayburn to design systems for Broadway Video, creating Saturday Night Live's first musical studio in stereo. He worked with Connecticut-based Comcast Sound, designing professional audio solutions, and Essential Telecommunications in Connecticut, making electronic systems for stock trading.

=== Digital audio ===
In the late 1980s, Rayburn began working with the Joiner Rose Group based in Arlington, Texas. The consulting firm was later known as Sound Visions Consulting. Through them, Rayburn accepted the task of thoroughly redesigning the sound system for the United States Senate, using for the first time a digital audio architecture based on computer control. The system had more than 100 microphone inputs and more than 100 mix-minus outputs, such that each senator's desk, holding a microphone and a small loudspeaker, could hear every other microphone but itself. Contact closures at each desk controlled microphone muting functions. The wiring assignments were required to be flexible to accommodate frequent changes of senator seating positions. All of this was engineered to work through digital signal processing (DSP).

Rayburn and Joiner Rose Group drew from several sources to create the Senate sound system solution. One of the most critical subcontractors was Peak Audio in Boulder, Colorado, a consulting firm later bought by Cirrus Logic. Peak Audio developed the DSP at the core of the Senate audio system, which was their first contract. Peak Audio and other contractors built and tested the system offsite, then installed it incrementally over two years because the Senate meetings could not be interrupted. The first full operation of the digital sound system was in 1994, with adjustments and improvements continuing through January 1995. It operated successfully for twelve years at which time the equipment control room was moved much farther away, requiring another complete redesign, with Rayburn again consulting.

Rayburn joined Peak Audio in 1997 and stayed with them for four years, helping to develop the CobraNet digital audio format, and working to establish the Senate DSP system as an independent product, licensed to Peavey Electronics who branded it MediaMatrix. Upon joining Peak Audio, Rayburn settled in nearby Longmont, although he wintered in Texas. After Peak Audio was bought by Cirrus Logic, Rayburn continued as a consultant on digital audio and DSP.

From 2005 to 2012, Rayburn worked for K2 Audio in Boulder as a principal consultant. Following that, he consulted as an independent contractor under the name Sound First. One of his notable accomplishments in 2017–18 was designing a massive dual-redundant digital audio system for Rogers Place, a sports arena in Canada. The system involved 480 inputs and 420 outputs, sending sound to 1,500 loudspeakers.

== Author and instructor ==
Rayburn wrote many articles about running sound for churches, and he participated in online discussion forums on the topic, especially Curt Taipale's Church Sound Check, started in the 1990s as an email list server. He continued this effort on the Facebook group Church Sound & Media Techs. He spoke at many conventions and symposia, including the AES Convention, SynAudCon, Infocomm and the convention of the Institute of Electrical and Electronics Engineers.

He was asked by Glen Ballou to assist with Ballou's classic textbook, Handbook for Sound Engineers, writing first two chapters and then three on virtual audio and digital systems. John M. Eargle brought Rayburn into his The Microphone Book project, and after Eargle died in 2007, Rayburn was given sole control of the book updates. Rayburn composed more material than would fit in the book, so he published the excess on his own website.

== Personal life ==
Ray Arthur Rayburn was raised in a Christian family, with both of his parents playing the organ for churches in New York City, and both teaching music students at home. His father's name was Ray Bishop Rayburn, and his paternal grandfather's name was Ray Lincoln Rayburn. In the neighborhood of Flushing at age 12, he submitted a science fair project involving a device for sensing changes in human blood. He continued modifying the electronics and increasing the effectiveness for two years, after which his electrophoretic separator was judged to work at a professional level, the accomplishment described in Boys' Life magazine in January 1963. He first operated the sound equipment in his church when he was in high school. He remained an avid church-goer all his life.

Rayburn married 23-year-old New Yorker Cornelia "Connie" Bockwoldt on November 4, 1972,, relocating to Chicago at the beginning of 1973. They welcomed their first son, Tim, in October that year. Three more sons were born after they moved back to the New York borough of Queens: Chris (1976), Mark (1978) and James (1980).

Among Rayburn's hobbies were photography and ham radio; he was active in the Longmont Amateur Radio Club (LARC), a Colorado group emphasizing emergency preparedness. He was also a certified firearms instructor.

Rayburn died from complications of COVID-19 on January 31, 2021, after spending two weeks in a Texas hospital for a broken ankle. He was 72 years old.
