= Lynika Strozier =

American researcher and scientist (1984–2020)

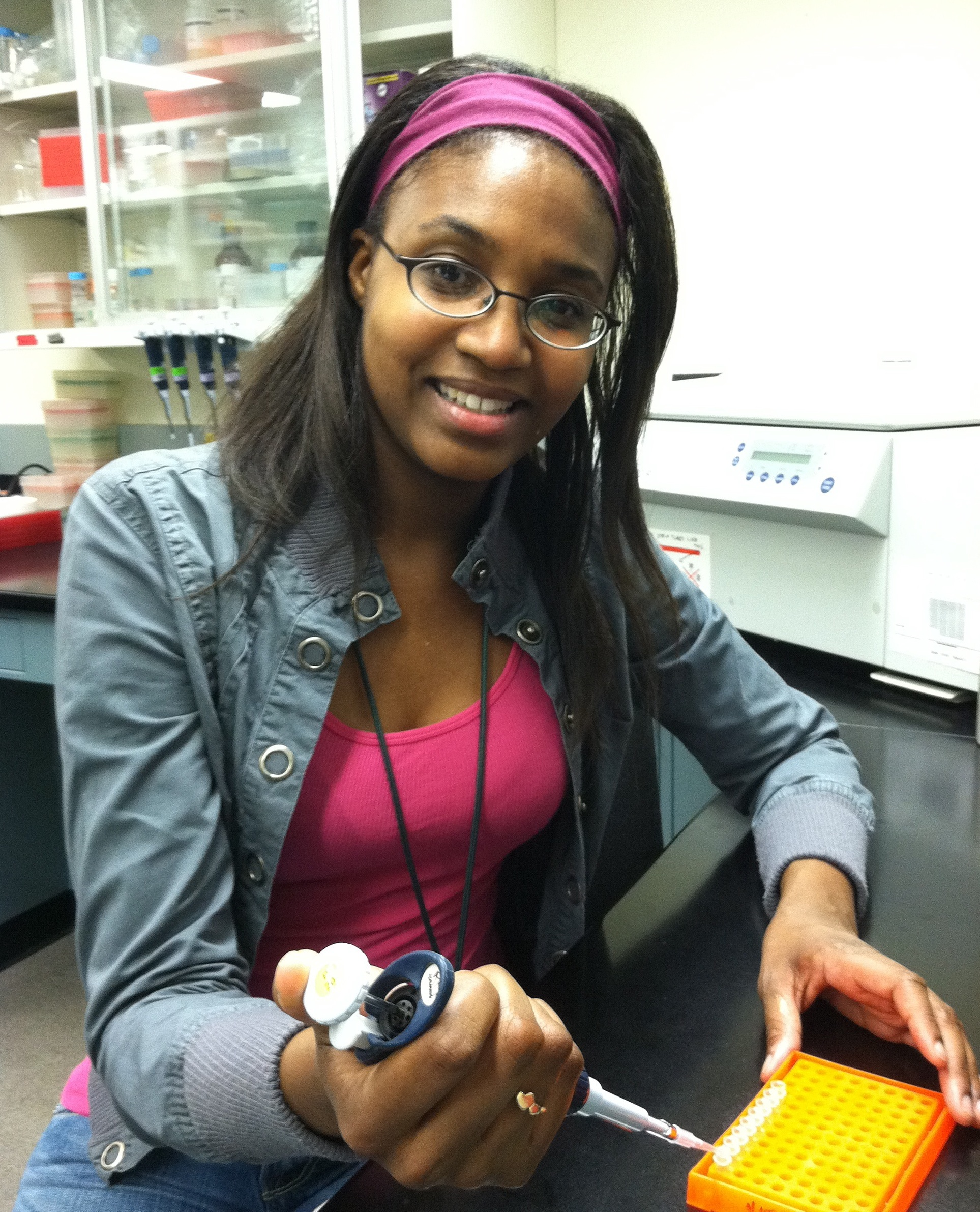
- Strozier in 2011
- Born: August 28, 1984; Birmingham, Alabama, US
- Died: June 7, 2020 (aged 35); Chicago, Illinois, US
- Occupations: Biology lab technician, lecturer

Lynika Strozier (August 28, 1984 – June 7, 2020) was an American researcher and scientist who died from COVID-19 in June 2020, during the COVID-19 pandemic in Illinois.

== Early life ==
Strozier was born in Birmingham, Alabama, but moved to Chicago, with her mother, when she was a toddler. Strozier's mother was a drug addict, who was not able to care for her properly, and her grandmother raised her from age 6. She was diagnosed with a learning disability at age 8 that profoundly affected both reading and math. According to The Chicago Tribune "when she read aloud, it was in such a halting manner that it sometimes sounded like she was gasping for breath."

Her grandmother recounted being advised that Lynika's disability was so profound that she should take steps to have her placed on social assistance for the rest of her life—advice she rejected, having confidence that Lynika could overcome her difficulties, with sufficient effort and support.

== Academic career ==
Strozier finished high school, and went to study at the University of Northern Iowa on a scholarship. But she did poorly, and returned to Chicago. She then enrolled at Truman College, where a mentor, Dr. Yvonne Harris, encouraged her to consider science, in spite of her disabilities. Her teachers describe her compensating for her disabilities through a combination of hard work and creative alternatives. For instance, she did all her calculations longhand and on paper, rather than using a calculator, because it helped her continue to visualize the meaning of the numbers. Harris described talking with her about how she was a visual thinker, and so she encouraged her to first draw pictures and diagrams of the information she wanted to present, and then use those drawings as an outline for her written presentations.

When she started to work at Chicago's Field Museum of Natural History as a student intern, she found she had a gift for lab work. One of her superiors described her as having "golden hands", being able to coax DNA from particularly small and difficult biological samples. She earned an associate degree from Truman, and, while working at the Field Museum, finished a Bachelor of Science at Dominican University, and went on to earn master's degrees at Loyola University Chicago and University of Illinois Chicago.

She spent most of her scientific career at the Field Museum. In addition to her work at the Field Museum she was one of two scientists at the School of the Art Institute of Chicago's science lab. In 2018, she finished two master's degrees, and in 2019 she started working as an adjunct professor at Malcolm X College—which colleagues describe as her dream job. In March 2020, the Gantz Family Collections Center at the Field Museum awarded Strozier the honorary role of Collections Associate.

== Death and legacy ==
Strozier died from COVID-19 in June 2020, during the COVID-19 pandemic in Chicago. Supporters raised funds through a GoFundMe initiative, to start a scholarship in her name for young African-American women entering the sciences.

== Selected publications ==
- von Konrat, Matt; de Lange, Peter; Greif, Matthew; Strozier, Lynika; Hentschel, Jörn; Heinrichs, Jochen (January 2, 2012). "Frullania knightbridgei, a new liverwort (Frullaniaceae, Marchantiophyta) species from the deep south of Aotearoa-New Zealand based on an integrated evidence-based approach". PhytoKeys (8): 13–36. Bibcode:2012PhytK...8...13V. doi:10.3897/phytokeys.8.2496. ISSN 1314-2003. PMC 3254247. PMID 22287928.
- Larraín, Juan; Carter, Benjamin; Shaw, Blanka; Hentschel, Joern; Strozier, Lynika; Furuki, Tatsuwo; Heinrichs, Jochen; Crandall-Stotler, Barbara; Engel, John; Konrat, Matt von (June 16, 2015). "The resurrection of Neohattoria Kamim. (Jubulaceae, Marchantiophyta): a six decade systematic conflict resolved through a molecular perspective". PhytoKeys (50): 101–122. Bibcode:2015PhytK..50..101L. doi:10.3897/phytokeys.50.4940. ISSN 1314-2003. PMC 4489086. PMID 26140022.
- Younger, Jane L.; Strozier, Lynika; Maddox, J. Dylan; Nyári, Árpád S.; Bonfitto, Matthew T.; Raherilalao, Marie J.; Goodman, Steven M.; Reddy, Sushma (July 1, 2018). "Hidden diversity of forest birds in Madagascar revealed using integrative taxonomy". Molecular Phylogenetics and Evolution. 124: 16–26. Bibcode:2018MolPE.124...16Y. doi:10.1016/j.ympev.2018.02.017. ISSN 1055-7903. PMID 29474976. S2CID 4854294.
