= List of The Virginian episodes =

The Virginian is an American Western television series which ran from September 19, 1962 until March 24, 1971, with a total of 249 episodes across nine seasons. It aired on NBC in color and starred James Drury and Doug McClure. The Virginian was renamed The Men from Shiloh for its final season.

== Series ==
Season	Episodes	Originally released	
Season	Episodes	First released	Last released
1	30	September 19, 1962	May 1, 1963
2	30	September 18, 1963	May 6, 1964
3	30	September 16, 1964	April 21, 1965
4	30	September 15, 1965	April 20, 1966
5	29	September 14, 1966	April 12, 1967
6	26	September 13, 1967	March 20, 1968
7	26	September 18, 1968	April 9, 1969
8	24	September 17, 1969	March 18, 1970
9	24	September 16, 1970	March 24, 1971

== Episodes ==
=== Season 1 (1962–63) ===
No. overall	No. in season	Title	Directed by	Written by	Original release date
1	1	"The Executioners"	David Friedkin	Morton S. Fine & David Friedkin	September 19, 1962
Although some question his guilt, a man is hanged in Medicine Bow when a woman denies being with him at the time. A stranger with many talents arrives in Medicine Bow and takes a job at Shiloh; he takes a keen interest in the main players. Guest Stars: Hugh O'Brian (Paul Taylor), Colleen Dewhurst (Celia Ames)
2	2	"Woman from White Wing"	Burt Kennedy	Written by : Morton S. Fine & David Friedkin; Story by : Burt Kennedy	September 26, 1962
A man at the unfinished White Wing cabin on Shiloh asks Judge Garth to meet him. Garth tells the Virginian the troubled history of his arrival at Shiloh. Garth's future with Betsy is threatened by the man and his desire for revenge. Guest Stars: Barry Sullivan (Frank Dawson) Note: Pippa Scott does not appear in this episode.
3	3	"Throw a Long Rope"	Ted Post	Harold Swanton	October 3, 1962
The ranchers are losing cattle, with homesteaders suspected of rustling, but they nearly hang an innocent man. Judge Garth's decision to fall back on the law of the range in dealing with the homesteaders drives a wedge between him and his foreman. Guest Stars: Jack Warden (Jubal Tatum) Note: Pippa Scott does not appear in this episode.
4	4	"The Big Deal"	Earl Bellamy	Written by : Winston Miller; Story by : Richard Jessup	October 10, 1962
Garth has a visitor from Colombia, Enrique Cuellar, who has inherited a critical piece of property in the middle of Shiloh used to move cattle. When Enrique learns Garth has held back information on it, he decides to put crippling pressure on Garth. Guest Stars: Ricardo Montalbán (Enrique Cuellar)
5	5	"The Brazen Bell"	James Sheldon	Roland Kibbee	October 17, 1962
A timid easterner and his wife arrive in Medicine Bow; the husband is looking for a job as a teacher. Two escaped convicts come through Medicine Bow taking the new teacher, his wife, and students hostage while The Virginian is the temporary sheriff. Guest Stars: George C. Scott (Arthur Lilley), Royal Dano (Dan Molder)
6	6	"Big Day, Great Day"	Harmon Jones	Charles Larson	October 24, 1962
The Judge, Steve Hill and Trampas travel to Casper on the 4th of July in order to pick up a fancy bed the Judge had ordered. In Casper they have several adventures revolving around a wrestling match involving an old acquaintance of the judge who is fighting for the championship, and Steve's romantic interest in one of the saloon girls who reminds him of a past lost love. Guest Stars: Aldo Ray (Frank Krause), Mickey Shaughnessy (Peter Muldoon) Note: Pippa Scott and Roberta Shore do not appear in this episode.
7	7	"Riff-Raff"	Bernard Girard	Jon Boothe	November 7, 1962
Trampas and Steve decide to join up with Teddy Roosevelt's Rough Riders. Comedy ensues with the boys wanting to do it their way. The Virginian shows up and, among other things, shows the easterners how to play polo western style. Guest Stars: Ray Danton (Lt. Hamilton) Note: Lee J. Cobb does not appear in this episode.
8	8	"Impasse"	Maurice Geraghty	Written by : Donn Mullally; Story by : Bernard Girard	November 14, 1962
The Virginian and men are capturing wild horses in the mountains for sale to the Army. The Kroeger clan claims all horses as theirs even though the law does not recognize the claim. When Kroeger can't drive them out, he uses other tactics. Guest Stars: Eddie Albert (Cal Kroeger) Note: Pippa Scott does not appear in this episode.
9	9	"It Tolls for Thee"	Samuel Fuller	Samuel Fuller	November 21, 1962
Martin Kalek and his gang kidnap Judge Garth for ransom. The Virginian pays the ransom, but the kidnappers refuse to release the Judge until they are able to escape into Idaho. The kidnappers head off, pursued not only by the Shiloh hands but also separately by Kalek's former crony Sharkey who is out for revenge on the criminal. Guest Stars: Lee Marvin (Martin Kalig)
10	10	"West"	Douglas Heyes	Written by : Douglas Heyes; Story by : Irwin Blacker	November 28, 1962
Seeking some excitement in his life, Trampas joins a group of older cowboys who set off to find adventure in what they still believe is the wild, lawless West. However, their outdated attitudes lead them into trouble and, eventually, tragedy. Guest Stars: Steve Cochran (Jamie Dobbs) Note: Lee J. Cobb, Gary Clarke, Pippa Scott and Roberta Shore do not appear in this episode.
11	11	"The Devil's Children"	William Witney	John Hawkins & Ward Hawkins	December 5, 1962
Tabby McCallum, beautiful but cruel teenage daughter of Tucker McCallum, is banned by The Virginian from Shiloh after she kills a steer "by mistake." With the unwitting help of her fiance, Dan Flood, Tabby sets off a tragic chain of events. Guest Stars: Charles Bickford (Tucker McCallum) Note: Lee J. Cobb and Pippa Scott do not appear in this episode.
12	12	"50 Days to Moose Jaw"	Maxwell Shane	Donald S. Sanford & Maxwell Shane	December 12, 1962
An old cowhand and a "greenhorn" join the Shiloh hands for a cattle drive to Moose Jaw, Canada. The old and young cowhands plan a future of running cattle together. The story culminates with a sheriff looking for one of the two new friends. Guest Stars: Brandon deWilde (James "Mike Flynn" Cafferty), James Gregory (Slim Jessup) Note: Lee J. Cobb and Pippa Scott do not appear in this episode.
13	13	"The Accomplice"	Maurice Geraghty	Howard Browne, William P. McGivern & Winston Miller	December 19, 1962
An old maid bank teller decides it is time to provide for herself and identifies Trampas as a bank robber and murderer in order to extort $10,000 from the actual thief. The Virginian is the only thing between Trampas and the hangman's noose. Guest Stars: Bette Davis (Delia Miller) Note: Lee J. Cobb and Pippa Scott do not appear in this episode.
14	14	"The Man from the Sea"	Herschel Daugherty	Morton S. Fine & David Friedkin	December 26, 1962
A seaman moving to Wyoming meets twin sisters traveling there with Trampas. When he takes an interest in one of them, she makes a tragic request of him that reveals not only to him but to Judge Garth the true nature of the twins' relationship. Guest Stars: Carol Lynley (Judith Morrow), Tom Tryon (Kevin Doyle), Shirley Knight (Susan Morrow); Note: This is the last episode to feature Pippa Scott. The actress was unhappy with the lack of development of her character, while at the same time Executive Producers Frank Price and Roy Huggins disliked the idea of the Virginian having a regular romantic interest. Roberta Shore does not appear in this episode.
15	15	"Duel at Shiloh"	Jerry Hopper	Story by : Dee Linford; Teleplay by : D.D. Beauchamp, Borden Chase & Don Ingalls	January 2, 1963
At a friend's grave Steve recalls how the man helped him survive his arrival at Medicine Bow and trained him as a cowboy proficient with guns. Sadly, the man's unwillingness to adapt to the times pushed Steve to his life at Shiloh. Guest Stars: Brian Keith (Johnny Wade) Note: Doug McClure does not appear in this episode.
16	16	"The Exiles"	Bernard Girard	Written by : Howard Browne & William P. McGivern; Story by : Roy Huggins	January 9, 1963
While trying to find a man to clear the Judge of a murder charge, The Virginian travels to Montana where he becomes involved with a singer who finds herself with her own problems. They are able to help each other solve their problems. Guest Stars: Tammy Grimes (Angela Clark), Ed Nelson (Ralph Slocum) Note: Lee J. Cobb, Doug McClure and Roberta Shore do not appear in this episode.
17	17	"The Judgment"	Earl Bellamy	Written by : Bob Duncan & Wanda Duncan; Screenplay by : Lawrence Roman	January 16, 1963
Garth recalls his early days as a judge in Medicine Bow in one particularly dangerous murder case. The family of the man convicted tries to intimidate the residents into having Garth overturn the conviction, putting him in a lonely position. Guest Stars: Clu Gulager (Jake Carewe), Patricia Barry (Alice Finley) Note: James Drury, Doug McClure and Gary Clarke do not appear in this episode.
18	18	"Say Goodbye to All That"	William Witney	Al C. Ward	January 23, 1963
A bear brings to the surface the lack of respect a father has for his son. When the father is paralyzed in a fight with Trampas, he goads the son into fighting a duel with Trampas for revenge. Trampas doesn't want it but can't ignore it. Guest Stars: Fabian (Martin Beldon) Note: Lee J. Cobb does not appear in this episode.
19	19	"The Man Who Couldn't Die"	David Friedkin	Written by : Harry Kleiner; Story by : Roy Huggins	January 30, 1963
Garth trails a woman to San Francisco whom he believes is part of a con game involving a railroad deal. Garth kills a man whom he believes to be a part of it. However, when no body can be found, he and others start to question his sanity. Guest Stars: Vera Miles (Mrs. Wallace)
20	20	"If You Have Tears"	Richard L. Bare	Written by : Frank Chase & Frank Fenton; Story by : Howard Browne & Roy Huggins	February 13, 1963
A friend has been framed for the murder of a woman's husband in Montana. The Virginian and Trampas go there to investigate the charge as they believe their friend, who says he is innocent even though he is known to them as a womanizer. Guest Stars: Dana Wynter (Leona Kelland), Robert Vaughn (Simon) Note: Lee J. Cobb and Gary Clarke do not appear in this episode.
21	21	"The Small Parade"	Paul Nickell	Written by : John Hawkins; Story by : Bernard Girard; Teleplay by : John Hawkins & Ward Hawkins	February 20, 1963
The Virginian, Trampas, and Steve help a vegetarian with a chimp who is framed for murder and a single woman with a group of orphans. Although they start trying to adopt out the kids, they soon become matchmakers for the couple and kids. Guest Stars: David Wayne (Martin Reese), John Banner (Gus Schultz) Note: Lee J. Cobb and Roberta Shore do not appear in this episode.
22	22	"Vengeance Is the Spur"	Robert Ellis Miller	Written by : Harry Kleiner; Story by : Roy Huggins	February 27, 1963
A wealthy woman persuades The Virginian to take her to the badlands to a gang led by the previous foreman of Shiloh. Her initial story is not the full truth. She wants to kill a man there because of her daughter but falls for the leader. Guest Stars: Michael Rennie (Michael O'Rourke), Nina Foch (Carol Frances) Note: Lee J. Cobb, Doug McClure and Gary Clarke do not appear in this episode.
23	23	"The Money Cage"	Alan Crosland Jr.	Written by : Jameson Brewer; Story by : Donn Mullally	March 6, 1963
A trio of con artists target Medicine Bow with an oil scam when a crisis threatening the bank throws a bigger scam their way. However, the leader's relationship with the banker's daughter causes him to him to alter the plan. Guest Stars: Steve Forrest (Roger "Buster" Layton / Dr. William C. Martin) Note: James Drury does not appear in this episode.
24	24	"The Golden Door"	John Brahm	Roy Huggins & Maxwell Shane	March 13, 1963
An immigrant is jailed for murder. The bias against him adds to the Judge's difficulty defending him. He is found not guilty but when another man is arrested for the crime, his conscience catches up with him as he learns more about U.S. law. Guest Stars: Karl Boehm (Karl Rilke) Note: Gary Clarke does not appear in this episode.
25	25	"A Distant Fury"	John English	Written by : Roy Huggins; Teleplay & Story : Howard Browne	March 20, 1963
Ed Frazer returns to Medicine Bow after serving three years for burglary. Steve fears for his life because his testimony was crucial in convicting him. Frazer's main interest isn't revenge but renewing his acquaintance with Helen Blaine. Guest Stars: Ida Lupino (Helen Blaine), Howard Duff (Ed Frazer)
26	26	"Echo of Another Day"	William A. Graham	Frank Fenton	March 27, 1963
Trampas helps a friend just out of prison who has multiple people after him for the location of $50,000 in gold he helped steal. He wants to give the money back, but he must deal with a ruthless partner in the robbery who will kill him. Guest Stars: Bradford Dillman (Sam Harder), John Dehner (Bleeck), Edward Asner (George Johnson) Note: Lee J. Cobb, Gary Clarke and Roberta Shore do not appear in this episode.
27	27	"Strangers at Sundown"	David Friedkin	Morton S. Fine, David Friedkin & Roy Huggins	April 3, 1963
An outlaw gang traps Garth and Betsy and several stagecoach passengers at a way station. The gang wants one of the passengers, George Wilson, who had betrayed the gang. The various passengers must decide whether to live with their consciences and hand Wilson over, or risk their own lives in a gun battle with the desperate gang. Guest Stars: Harry Morgan (Kendall Jones) Note: James Drury, Doug McClure and Gary Clarke do not appear in this episode.
28	28	"The Mountain of the Sun"	Bernard McEveety	Written by : Harry Kleiner; Story by : Lou Morheim	April 17, 1963
In the southwest, The Virginian meets three women and helps them make their way to the Yaqui Indians, to whom they want to be missionaries after the Yaqui killed their husbands. Along the way he and the youngest woman become romantically involved. Guest Stars: Dolores Hart (Cathy Maywood), Jeanette Nolan (Helen Dyer) Note: Lee J. Cobb, Doug McClure, Gary Clarke and Roberta Shore do not appear in this episode. Jeanette Nolan became a cast regular as Holly Grainger in seasons 6, 7, and 8.
29	29	"Run Away Home"	Richard L. Bare	Written by : Jameson Brewer; Story by : Gene Roddenberry; Teleplay by : Howard Browne	April 24, 1963
The Virginian and Steve are forced to carry $40,000 back to Medicine Bow after a bank run closes all banks. The Virginian must fend off a family who think part of the money is theirs while contending with a dreaming runaway girl. Note: This episode was later remade as the Alias Smith and Jones first-season episode "The Girl in Boxcar #3". Lee J. Cobb, Doug McClure and Roberta Shore do not appear in this episode.
30	30	"The Final Hour"	Robert Douglas	Written by : Harry Kleiner; Story by : Bernard Girard & Ward Hawkins	May 1, 1963
Garth allows a controversial coal mine to be opened with Polish miners. Among them is a beautiful woman. She has eyes for Trampas, but one of the miners and a friend of Trampas have eyes for her, with tragic results as Trampas falls for her. Guest Stars: Ulla Jacobsson (Polcia) Note: Gary Clarke does not appear in this episode.

=== Season 2 (1963–64) ===
No. overall	No. in season	Title	Directed by	Written by	Original release date
31	1	"Ride a Dark Trail"	John Peyser	Story by : Arthur Browne Jr. Teleplay by : E.M. Parsons	September 18, 1963
The Virginian accidentally comes upon, and is held at gunpoint by, young Lon Mortison. The boy had been searching for a gambler who he thinks is responsible for his father's suicide, and had already shot and wounded a man who interfered. To convince the boy to give himself up, The Virginian recounts in flashback how Trampas first came to Shiloh Ranch, seeking revenge on Judge Garth who had been forced to kill Trampas' father in self-defense. Note: Roberta Shore does not appear in this episode.
32	2	"To Make This Place Remember"	Robert Ellis Miller	Harold Swanton	September 25, 1963
Garth is asked by a friend to put on a defense for a son who has already been hung. The community fights it but Garth plunges ahead with the aid of a judge. The outcome uncovers several unpleasant facts about the community and the truth. Guest Stars: Joan Blondell (Rosanna Dobie), John Dehner (Frank Sturgis) Note: James Drury, Doug McClure, Gary Clarke and Roberta Shore do not appear in this episode.
33	3	"No Tears for Savannah"	Don McDougall	William R. Cox & Carey Wilber	October 2, 1963
In Santa Rita The Virginian meets an old flame, Savannah, who has been seeing a very jealous local man, Gordie Madden. Savannah is accused of murdering Madden and The Virginian gets Judge Garth to come and defend her. However, the cards are stacked against them as Madden's wealthy father controls the town, including the Sheriff, and wants revenge. Guest Stars: Everett Sloane (Henry T. Madden), Gena Rowlands (Savannah), Stephen McNally (Sheriff Avedon), Arthur Franz (Fitz Warren), Joanna Moore (Jane Dent) Note: Doug McClure, Gary Clarke and Roberta Shore do not appear in this episode.
34	4	"A Killer in Town"	John English	Bob Duncan & Wanda Duncan	October 9, 1963
A bounty hunter named George Wolfe comes to Medicine Bow, having been summoned by a now-dead informant who told Wolfe a fugitive is in town. Although the informant had left a letter revealing the fugitive's identity in a lock box at the bank, it can not be accessed until the circuit judge can return and issue a court order. Trampas, who had accidentally become involved with some felons two years before, thinks he is Wolfe's quarry and Wolfe is suspicious of him. Before matters can come to a head, however, an outbreak of typhoid fever intervenes. Guest Stars: Broderick Crawford (George Wolfe)
35	5	"The Evil That Men Do"	Stuart Heisler	Frank Chase	October 16, 1963
Garth takes on a parolee that The Virginian has an interest in who has been in an orphanage or prison since he was a baby. He has trouble adjusting to life outside prison and Garth is worried about Betsy's growing interest in him. Guest Stars: Robert Redford (Matthew Cordell) Note: Doug McClure does not appear in this episode.
36	6	"It Takes a Big Man"	Bernard McEveety	Harry Kronman	October 23, 1963
Judge Garth is asked by an old friend, Wade Anders, to take his eldest son Hank to work as a hand at Shiloh. He wants the son to eventually take over his ranch but Hank has personal problems which make him difficult to handle, especially a hatred for Indians. At Shiloh he has run-ins with Trampas who is acting as foreman while The Virginian is away, and this conflict eventually leads to tragedy and a showdown. Guest Stars: Lloyd Nolan (Wade Anders), Chris Robinson (Henry "Hank" Anders), Ryan O'Neal (Ben Anders)
37	7	"Brother Thaddeus"	John English	William Fay	October 30, 1963
Former ne'er-do-well Willie Caine is now a monk, Brother Thaddeus. He is involved in establishing a mission and boys' school on property owned by Judge Garth, and Trampas and Steve Hill are helping to build the mission. A gang, including a former crony of Caine's, robs the train and Sheriff Abbott locks Thaddeus up as an accomplice. Thaddeus manages to escape and with the help of Trampas sets out to track down the gang and exonerate himself. Guest Stars: Albert Salmi (Brother Thaddeus / Willie Caine) Note: James Drury does not appear in this episode.
38	8	"A Portrait of Marie Valonne"	Earl Bellamy	Dean Riesner	November 6, 1963
After delivering a herd of cattle to New Orleans, The Virginian meets and falls for a mysterious woman, Marie Valonne. He is attacked and the woman disappears. In his attempts to find her he comes into conflict with Johnny Madrid who controls some corrupt politicians. Despite the assistance of a local police detective, Dan Bohannon, The Virginian is unsuccessful in finding Marie and is only left with her picture. Guest Stars: Madlyn Rhue (Marie Valonne) Note: Lee J. Cobb, Doug McClure and Roberta Shore do not appear in this episode.
39	9	"Run Quiet"	Herschel Daugherty	Ed Adamson & Norman Katkov	November 13, 1963
Steve Hill befriends a disheveled deaf-mute named Judd and convinces The Virginian to gives him a job at Shiloh ranch. Judd is accused of murdering a gambler, runs off and is befriended by spinster farm owner Ruth Ferris. Steve Hill manages to track down Judd, tells him to give himself up and then sets off after the real perpetrators. The murderers try to kill Steve but he is saved by the arrival of Judd, who then returns to the waiting Ruth with whom he has fallen in love. Guest Stars: Clu Gulager (Judd) Note: Lee J. Cobb and Doug McClure do not appear in this episode.
40	10	"Stopover in a Western Town"	Richard L. Bare	Carey Wilber	November 27, 1963
A cowboy becomes infatuated with an eastern society girl he meets on a train. Against The Virginian's advice he courts the spoiled girl but is forced to turn to rustling to pay for it. In the end she learns the serious cost of her actions. Guest Stars: Dick York (Jefferson Tolliver) Note: Lee J. Cobb and Roberta Shore do not appear in this episode.
41	11	"The Fatal Journey"	Bernard McEveety	John Hawkins	December 4, 1963
After she calls for the President to bring in the army to rid the badlands of outlaws, newspaper editor Molly Wood, the Virginian's love interest, is murdered by four of those outlaws. The Virginian poses as a prison escapee to join the gang and exact his revenge. Guest Stars: Robert Lansing (George Calhoun) Note: Doug McClure and Roberta Shore do not appear in this episode.
42	12	"A Time Remembered"	William Witney	Peter B. Germano	December 11, 1963
Garth recognizes opera singer Elena as a close friend from his early days as a lawyer. The two rekindle their old relationship but Garth is forced to defend her against murder charges which ultimately forces him to uncover the unsettling truth. Guest Stars: Yvonne De Carlo (Helen Haldeman / Elena) Note: James Drury appears in stock footage only.
43	13	"Siege"	Don McDougall	Donn Mullally	December 18, 1963
After winning $1,000 at poker, Trampas returns to Logan, New Mexico to repay several debts and see the girl he'd left, but she's married to the Marshal. The family that Trampas had lived with is killed by Comancheros caught by Trampas; only he and the Marshal are willing to stand up to them. Note: James Drury, Lee J. Cobb, Gary Clarke and Roberta Shore do not appear in this episode.
44	14	"Man of Violence"	William Witney	Story by : James Patrick; Teleplay by : John D. F. Black	December 25, 1963
After his uncle is killed in Texas, Trampas chases the killer into Apache country off limits to whites where he found gold. Trampas is forced to take along multiple companions including the man's wife, a gold seeker, and a drunk doctor. Guest Stars: William Bryant (Paul Judson), Peggy McCay (Helen Hammond Judson), DeForest Kelley (Lt. Beldon), Leonard Nimoy (Wismer). Note: James Drury, Lee J. Cobb, Gary Clarke and Roberta Shore do not appear in this episode.
45	15	"The Invaders"	Bernard McEveety	Donn Mullally	January 1, 1964
Garth's rival from Texas buys a ranch near Shiloh with an eye to expand it. Trampas has an eye for his daughter, adding to the friction when the rival puts pressure on small ranches to sell out and cuts the water supply to them and Shiloh. Guest Stars: Ed Begley (Mike Tyrone), Beverley Owen (Margaret Tyrone)
46	16	"Roar from the Mountain"	Earl Bellamy	Story by : Franklin Barton & Carey Wilber; Teleplay by : Carey Wilber	January 8, 1964
Steve volunteers to hunt a killer mountain lion alone. After losing his supplies, he is helped by a lonely couple. They lost their son to the cat and maimed it. The husband helps Steve who soon learns the cat is not his only enemy. Guest Stars: Jack Klugman (Charles Mayhew), Joyce Bulifant (Nancy Mayhew) Note: Roberta Shore does not appear in this episode.
47	17	"The Fortunes of J. Jimerson Jones"	Don McDougall	Carey Wilber	January 15, 1964
J. Jimerson Jones is on the same train to Chicago with Garth and Betsy where Garth helps him adjust to city life. Betsy has her first love with a cub reporter and Jones is taken in by a beautiful woman while another tries to protect him. Guest Stars: Pat O'Brien (J. Jimerson Jones), John Banner (August the Head Waiter) Note: James Drury, Doug McClure and Gary Clarke do not appear in this episode.
48	18	"The Thirty Days of Gavin Heath"	John Florea	Mel Harrold	January 22, 1964
A failed British rancher returns to Medicine Bow a wealthy man but conflicted by his cowardice in the Army. After learning he won't die from a dog bite and Trampas is taken captive by Indians, he is given a second chance to prove himself. Guest Stars: Leo Genn (Gavin Heath)
49	19	"The Drifter"	Don McDougall	Story by : Frank Fenton; Teleplay by : Carey Wilber	January 29, 1964
The Virginian recalls his arrival at Shiloh when he went to work for a neighboring ranch that was close to a range war with Shiloh. He is caught in a feud with the foreman causing the fight, and falls in love with the girl engaged to him. Guest Stars: Leif Erickson (Peterson) Note: Doug McClure and Roberta Shore do not appear in this episode.
50	20	"First to Thine Own Self"	Earl Bellamy	Les Crutchfield	February 12, 1964
Randy, a lonely, distrusting drifter comes to the aid of a child, only to be accused of killing her father. Only Betsy's faith in him prevents harm from coming to him and the young girl he tries to protect from the killers. Note: Lee J. Cobb and Doug McClure do not appear in this episode.
51	21	"A Matter of Destiny"	Maurice Geraghty	Al C. Ward	February 19, 1964
Trampas appears to be in the lead for a local girl, until an eastern meat packing tycoon who comes to Medicine Bow to take over his new ranch catches her eye. Trampas is the only one against him until the ranchers learn he has tricked them. Guest Stars: Peter Graves (Robert Gaynor), Richard Jaeckel (Pat Wade) Note: Gary Clarke does not appear in this episode.
52	22	"Smile of a Dragon"	Andrew V. McLaglen	Story by : Borden Chase; Teleplay by : Cy Chermak & Don Ingalls	February 26, 1964
An injured Trampas is thought to be a stagecoach robber according to a Sheriff and is reported dead to Shiloh. He is forced to rely on a young Chinese woman for help until a grieving Steve arrives to find he must help rescue Trampas. Guest Stars: Miyoshi Umeki (Kim Ho), Richard Carlson (Sheriff Marden), Frank Overton (Mr. Umber) Note: James Drury and Lee J. Cobb do not appear in this episode.
53	23	"The Intruders"	Charles R. Rondeau	Dean Riesner	March 4, 1964
Betsy's Chicago visitor has a shaky visit, starting with Garth ignoring his wire. Garth wants the ranch deserted to host a secret meeting with an Indian Chief but intruders invade to kill the Chief and further impede the couple's visit. Guest Stars: Darren McGavin (Mark Troxel), Hugh Marlowe (Billings) Note: Doug McClure and Gary Clarke do not appear in this episode.
54	24	"Another's Footsteps"	R. G. Springsteen	Frank Chase	March 11, 1964
The Virginian tracks the man who killed a young friend in a bank robbery. He finds the man's wife and young son alone on a run-down ranch. Finding they need help, he stays on as a ranch hand but soon finds himself in a misguided situation. Guest Stars: Sheree North (Karen Anders), John Agar (Tom Anders), Paul Petersen (Dan Grant) Note: Lee J. Cobb, Doug McClure and Roberta Shore do not appear in this episode.
55	25	"Rope of Lies"	Herschel Daugherty	Les Crutchfield	March 25, 1964
Steve takes the job of foreman at a ranch with a new female owner, against the advice of his friends. The job gets rougher after he is forced to shoot a stranger. He then learns why he was hired when he faces murder charges from his boss. Guest Stars: Diana Millay (Alma Lowell), Peter Breck (Jess Carver) Note: Lee J. Cobb and Doug McClure do not appear in this episode.
56	26	"The Secret of Brynmar Hall"	Robert Totten	Herman Groves	April 1, 1964
A storm forces Randy to stay with Betsy and three of her friends at a mansion where they spent time in their youth. The host's daughter was killed two years earlier in a fire. The host has gifts and other surprises that put them on edge. Guest Stars: Jane Wyatt (Sarah Brynmar) Note: Lee J. Cobb, Doug McClure and Gary Clarke do not appear in this episode.
57	27	"The Long Quest"	Richard L. Bare	Carey Wilber	April 8, 1964
The Virginian helps a neighbor lady when her son is claimed by an actress as her own son. Her friends in Medicine Bow are upset by the actress and her detective friend with their actions, but it appears they have an ironclad case. Guest Stars: Ruta Lee (Judith Holly), Joseph Campanella (Corbett) Note: Lee J. Cobb, Doug McClure and Gary Clarke do not appear in this episode.
58	28	"A Bride for Lars"	Earl Bellamy	True Boardman	April 15, 1964
Trampas wins the job of bringing an injured neighbor's bride to him from Laramie. However, the trip back is filled with problems including a bride with a mind of her own, Indians, potential outlaws, and a surprise at the end for Trampas. Guest Stars: Katherine Crawford (Anna Swenson) Note: Lee J. Cobb and Randy Boone do not appear in this episode.
59	29	"Dark Destiny"	Don McDougall	Frank Chase	April 29, 1964
A horse thief's daughter staying at Shiloh is drafted to help an injured Randy, who can't walk due to a spinal injury, with therapy. Their frosty relationship changes when Randy gives up and her father escapes jail looking to kill Steve. Guest Stars: Brenda Scott (Billie Jo Conrad) Note: Lee J. Cobb, Doug McClure and Roberta Shore do not appear in this episode.
60	30	"A Man Called Kane"	William Witney	Dean Riesner	May 6, 1964
News that Betsy and Randy found over $900 in gold in a cave on Shiloh brings two men to the ranch looking for money. One is a government agent looking for a buried cache of bearer bonds. The other is Randy's older brother with a past. Guest Stars: Jeremy Slate (Johnny Kane / Benton), Dick Foran (Mr. Duggan) Note: This is the last episode to feature Gary Clarke as a regular cast member. Clarke had started to become difficult on set – he had refused to be the central character in the episode "A Time Remembered" and was in support of James Drury when the latter tried to change his horse from an Appaloosa to a Paint Horse. As a result, Clarke was in breach of contract and Executive Producer Frank Price deemed that he was of no use as a backup leading man. Clarke would, however, appear in three episodes the following season. Lee J. Cobb and Doug McClure do not appear in this episode.

=== Season 3 (1964–65) ===
No. overall	No. in season	Title	Directed by	Written by	Original release date
61	1	"Ryker"	Don Richardson	Frank Fenton	September 16, 1964
Ryker is offered the job of stopping a small rancher from paying a mortgage. He is too honest to do it but is framed for killing the rancher. He is a good lawman and the sheriff wants him as a deputy but Ryker wants to save his name first. Guest Stars: Leslie Nielsen (John Hagen), Anne Helm (Janet Hale) and a relatively unknown Raquel Welch as a "saloon girl".
62	2	"Dark Challenge"	Don McDougall	Story by : Joseph Hoffman; Teleplay by : True Boardman	September 23, 1964
A family moves nearby with a pretty daughter drawing the attention of Trampas. However, when he pushes her to dance, he learns she has a club foot. This is compounded by the pressure on her brother to support her in lieu of his own life. Guest Stars: Victor Jory (Carl Hendricks), Chris Robinson (Arnie Hendricks), Katharine Ross (Jenny Hendricks)
63	3	"The Stallion"	Bernard McEveety	Louis Vittes & Carey Wilber	September 30, 1964
Randy finds an abused stallion in need of medical care. He takes the horse to an alcoholic vet who is a loner but the interest of the daughter of a local rancher. The vet works miracles on the horse while horse works miracles on the vet. Guest Stars: Robert Culp (Charles Orwell), Jena Engstrom (Jody Wingate)
64	4	"The Hero"	Richard L. Bare	Clair Huffaker	October 7, 1964
An eastern reporter arrives to write a story on the Judge. He has traveled the world and great talent in many areas impressing the men and especially Betsy who falls for him. All is not as it seems when his true intentions are learned. Guest Stars: Steve Forrest (Jim Templeton), Warren Stevens (Ray Harding)
65	5	"Felicity's Spring"	Don McDougall	Jean Holloway	October 14, 1964
The Virginian falls in love with a woman who has the heart of every man around. As the two plan their marriage, her sister and father debate whether they should tell The Virginian the truth about her terminal illness and short time left. Guest Stars: Katherine Crawford (Felicity Andrews), Mariette Hartley (Kate Andrews)
66	6	"The Brazos Kid"	Don McDougall	Carey Wilber	October 21, 1964
A pretty female eastern reporter arriving broke takes a reporter job in Medicine Bow. She digs up an old story on the Brazos Kid to make money but her talent for inflating the truth lands not only The Virginian but the real one in trouble. Guest Stars: Barbara Eden (Samantha Fry), Skip Homeier (Joe Cleary)
67	7	"Big Image, Little Man"	William Witney	Frank Chase & Carey Wilber	October 28, 1964
A self-important businessman is pushed off a train and found by The Virginian and Steve on a cattle drive across a desert. He is forced to work his way on the drive and learns some lessons about himself and his impact on other's lives. Guest Stars: Linden Chiles (Paul Leland)
68	8	"A Father for Toby"	Alan Crosland Jr.	Story by : Tom Seller; Teleplay by : True Boardman	November 4, 1964
A boy in an orphanage near Shiloh latches onto Trampas as his father while Trampas is attracted to the woman running the orphanage. Trampas agrees to help the boy but when his father arrives on Shiloh with men chasing him, problems arise. Guest Stars: Rory Calhoun (Jim Shea / Jim Hansen), Joanna Moore (Miss Ellen Lawrence), Kurt Russell (Toby Shea)
69	9	"The Girl from Yesterday"	John Florea	Story by : Mark Rodgers & Louis Vittes; Teleplay by : Mark Rodgers	November 11, 1964
Steve is asked by a US Marshal to renew an old relationship with a woman who is now believed to be part of the Wade gang. The reluctant Steve goes along with the idea but finds it a hard task made harder when old feelings resurface. Guest Stars: Mark Richman (Jack Wade), Ruta Lee (Jane Carlyle)
70	10	"Return a Stranger"	Maurice Geraghty	Story by : George F. Slavin; Teleplay by : True Boardman	November 18, 1964
A local miner's son returns to Medicine Bow from college with the technical knowledge and financial backers to reopen his father's silver mine. Due to financial constraints, corners are cut putting people and cattle in danger. Guest Stars: Leif Erickson (Charley Ryan), Peter Brown (Craig Ryan)
71	11	"All Nice and Legal"	Don McDougall	Jean Holloway	November 25, 1964
A female attorney comes to Medicine Bow to open her new practice. After a rocky start with The Virginian, he becomes her first client and she proves her ability. Off to a strong start she jumps into a case putting him into danger. Guest Stars: Anne Francis (Victoria Greenly)
72	12	"A Gallows for Sam Horn"	Don McDougall	Dean Riesner	December 2, 1964
A feud between ranchers and a railroad tycoon result in murder charges against a rancher when the tycoon's son is killed. Ryker and the Judge try to prove his innocence but must rely on a woman, deserted by the murdered man, who disappears. Guest Stars: John Lupton (Sam Horn), Edward Binns (John Briscoe), George Kennedy (Jack Marshman), Laurel Goodwin (Peg Dineen), Buck Taylor (Scott Briscoe)
73	13	"Portrait of a Widow"	Don McDougall	Thomas W. Blackburn & Lawrence Edward Watkin	December 9, 1964
A French portrait painter returns from Chicago to Medicine Bow with Betsy and a new widow to paint her. The Judge suspects he is not being truthful but he seems to be the right medicine for the grieving widow as the Judge investigates. Guest Stars: Vera Miles (Maggie Menken), John Gavin (John Boulanger / Baker)
74	14	"The Payment"	John Florea	Thomas Thompson	December 16, 1964
Ryker invites the man who raised him to come to Medicine Bow after being released from 10 years in prison. When Ryker finds Abe has invited his family to join him, he knows there are problems as Shiloh makes a record sized cattle shipment. Guest Stars: Lloyd Nolan (Abe Clayton)
75	15	"A Man of the People"	William Witney	Story by : William Fay; Teleplay by : William Fay & True Boardman	December 23, 1964
Garth along with other ranchers are worried about homesteaders trying to move onto their public range. Garth realizes the land is not fit for farming but the politician leading them is an old friend who has said it is fit for farming. Guest Stars: James Dunn (actor) (Congressman Matthew J. Cosgrove)
76	16	"The Hour of the Tiger"	Richard L. Bare	Harry Kleiner	December 30, 1964
A rock slide trapping Shiloh cattle gives an old neighbor and onetime friend of Garth the chance for revenge against Garth. Garth is forced to bring in Chinese labors to dig a tunnel but one of the workers is a surprise for The Virginian. Guest Stars: Cely Carrillo (Kum Ho), Tom Tully (Junius Antlow)
77	17	"Two Men Named Laredo"	William Hale	Story by : Don Brinkley & Don Tait; Teleplay by : Don Brinkley	January 6, 1965
After he saves Trampas The Virginian hires a temporary hand full time. He seems to be the ideal hand but a loner until a man and woman are killed in Medicine Bow and he shoots Trampas. Garth realizes there may be two personas to the man. Guest Stars: Fabian (Eddie / Josh Laredo)
78	18	"Hideout"	Don McDougall	Story by : Cy Chermak; Screenplay by : Edna Anhalt	January 13, 1965
A lost Betsy finds a man and his son living isolated in the mountains catching and breaking horses. They have a secret history that she tries to keep hidden but events force her and others into actions that may send the man to the gallows. Guest Stars: Forrest Tucker (Martin Evers), Andrew Prine (Clint Evers)
79	19	"Six Graves at Cripple Creek"	Maurice Geraghty	Carey Wilber	January 27, 1965
Ryker receives a clue as to the location of a man he wants for a murder two years ago. He goes on the trail but is forced to guide a young woman looking for her dad but both men may have been killed in an Indian massacre at Cripple Creek. Guest Stars: John Doucette (Marshall Goodbody)
80	20	"Lost Yesterday"	Don McDougall	True Boardman	February 3, 1965
The Virginian rescues a passenger after they are in an accident near Shiloh but she has amnesia afterwards. He takes a deep interest in her even after she moves in with the local school teacher but her background catches up with them. Guest Stars: Shirley Knight (Carol Malone / April)
81	21	"A Slight Case of Charity"	Richard Benedict	Written by : Richard Benedict; Story by : Howard Browne; Teleplay by : Howard Browne	February 10, 1965
Trampas is sent to collect the money from a cattle sale for ranchers at Medicine Bow. He receives the money in cash but events lead to a woman borrowing $1500 of it forcing Trampas and later Ryker to track her to recover the money. Guest Stars: Kathryn Hays (Charity)
82	22	"You Take the High Road"	John Florea	Story by : Frank Fenton & Daniel B. Ullman; Teleplay by : Daniel B. Ullman	February 17, 1965
The Virginian hires a man kicked off a cattle drive by the trail boss even though he is half owner of the herd. The herd passing Shiloh is suspected of having Spanish Fever. The man returns to the herd but his immaturity creates problems. Guest Stars: Richard Beymer (Mark Shannon), Diana Lynn (Peggy Shannon)
83	23	"Shadows of the Past"	Don McDougall	Frank Chase	February 24, 1965
Ryker's chess playing friend's bride he met in San Francisco arrives but unknown to him she has a hidden past she hides with a bottle. At the same time two brothers released from prison visit Ryker wanting revenge for their dead brother. Guest Stars: Jack Warden (John Conway)
84	24	"Legend for a Lawman"	John Florea	Story by : Harry Kleiner & Frank Telford; Teleplay by : Preston Wood	March 3, 1965
The naive Randy is tricked into helping rob a bank in Kansas and due to circumstances is accused by a respected sheriff of being involved in the robbery. The Virginian is left on his own to prove Randy's innocence versus the sheriff. Guest Stars: Adam West (Sam Loomis)
85	25	"Timberland"	Don McDougall	Sheldon Stark	March 10, 1965
A crusty timber man threatens the ranchers' grazing lands by clear cutting. He and his foreman expect his daughter to marry the foreman but she has second thoughts when a rancher's son shows an interest in her resulting in a killing. Guest Stars: Martin Milner (David Ferguson), William Smith (Paul Rogers), Joan Freeman (Katherine Daniels)
86	26	"Dangerous Road"	Maurice Geraghty	John Hawkins & Ward Hawkins	March 17, 1965
Trampas escorts a murderer back to a town where he knew the sheriff. There is a question of the man's innocence plus Trampas learns the sheriff died in a horse accident two days later. He decides to investigate the questionable stories. Guest Stars: Simon Oakland (Bob Coulter), Tom Simcox (Deputy Fenton)
87	27	"Farewell to Honesty"	Leon Benson	Story by : Carey Wilber; Teleplay by : True Boardman	March 24, 1965
The Virginian goes to Honesty, Wyoming to collect $8000 owed the Judge on a crooked cattle deal. The town is owned and run by the corrupt man who owes the money. The fight over the money spills into a murder charge against the Virginian. Guest Stars: Richard Carlson (Major Ralph Forrester)
88	28	"Old Cowboy"	William Witney	Gabrielle Upton	March 31, 1965
Trampas feeling sorry for an old cowboy and his grandson decides to hire him at Shiloh on his own. The old man complains about the way the other hands do their jobs but his mistakes and accidents proved costly to others and Shiloh itself. Guest Stars: Franchot Tone (Murdock), Billy Mumy (Willy)
89	29	"The Showdown"	Don McDougall	Gene L. Coon	April 14, 1965
The Virginian arrives in Monolith, Arizona to buy cattle from the Landers family but finds himself in the middle of a feud between them and the city marshal Merle Frome and his brother Ben. The Fromes seem overbearing but maybe with a reason. Guest Stars: Michael Ansara (Marshal Merle Frome), Leonard Nimoy (Ben Frome), Peter Whitney (Jake Landers), Tom Skerritt (Billy Landers)
90	30	"We've Lost a Train"	Earl Bellamy	Borden Chase	April 21, 1965
Trampas is sent to Mexico to pick up a bull. He must go through Laredo where he gets into trouble with three Texas Rangers over a woman. Circumstances put him with them as they find a lost train and then the money stolen from it. Guest Stars: Ida Lupino (Mama Dolores), Fernando Lamas (Captain Estrada), Rhonda Fleming (Carmelita), Phillip Carey (Captain Edward Parmalee), William Smith (Joe Riley), Neville Brand (Reese Bennett), Peter Brown (Chad Cooper)

=== Season 4 (1965–66) ===
No. overall	No. in season	Title	Directed by	Written by	Original release date
91	1	"The Brothers"	Tony Leader	Dick Nelson	September 15, 1965
Ryker must track down a close friend and his family after the man killed an Army guard while breaking his brother out of the stockade before being shot for dereliction. After they fight off Indians, the man is forced to face the law. Guest Stars: Robert Lansing (Matt Denning), Andrew Prine (Will Denning), Kurt Russell (Andy Denning)
92	2	"Day of the Scorpion"	Robert Butler	Don Ingalls	September 22, 1965
The Virginian accidentally kills the son of an Australian sheep rancher who has little time and love for his family. His daughter is in the middle between The Virginian who she loves and her father who barely notices her.
93	3	"A Little Learning"	Don Richardson	Harry Kronman	September 29, 1965
Rafe Simmons wants to learn to read so he can read his mother's diary. He quits Shiloh to move to Medicine Bow to learn from the attractive Martha Perry. However, the big man is caught in a tangle with town bullies and her ex-con husband. Guest Stars: Albert Salmi (Rafe Simmons), Susan Oliver (Miss Martha Perry / Mrs. Bert Kramer), Bruce Dern (Bert Kramer)
94	4	"The Claim"	Bernard L. Kowalski	Shirl Hendryx	October 6, 1965
In a mid life crisis Trampas decides to quit Shiloh when his vagabond friend arrives in Medicine Bow. The two head for Deadwood and excitement where a prospector takes them but his claim is on Indian land which is illegal and dangerous. Guest Stars: William Shatner (Luke Milford)
95	5	"The Awakening"	Leon Benson	Robert Crean	October 13, 1965
Betsy meets the broke minister David Henderson who is roaming the west looking for a calling after a turbulent history. He becomes involved with helping local miners fighting the mine management, as well as with Betsy, who has found her calling. Guest Stars: Glenn Corbett (David Henderson), Roberta Shore (Betsy Garth)
96	6	"Ring of Silence"	Don Richardson	Story by : Ruth L. Adams; Teleplay by : Barry Oringer	October 27, 1965
Ryker is on a stage that is stopped by a group of Mexicans who are after one of the passengers for killing one of their women. The leader knows Ryker, who is proposing they let the law settle the issue, but the Mexicans want justice – now. Guest Stars: Earl Holliman (Wiley), Joyce Van Patten (Miss Stuart), Royal Dano (Daniels)
97	7	"Jennifer"	Don Richardson	Story by : Rita Lakin; Teleplay by : Theodore Apstein & Rita Lakin	November 3, 1965
Judge Garth's niece Jennifer comes to live with him at Shiloh after her parents are killed in an accident. However, she is uncomfortable with her uncle who disapproved of her father. A young man she met seems to help but he has a past. Guest Stars: James MacArthur (Johnny Bradford)
98	8	"Nobility of Kings"	Paul Stanley	Story by : James Duff McAdams; Teleplay by : Richard Fielder	November 10, 1965
Ben Justin takes over a ranch next to Shiloh. He has had a string of bad luck including the death of his first wife. His son wants to help him but Ben keeps him and his wife Mary at arms length out of fear they will see the real Ben. Guest Stars: Charles Bronson (Ben Justin), Lois Nettleton (Mary Justin), George Kennedy (Tom Suchette)
99	9	"Show Me a Hero"	Leon Benson	Story by : Alvin Boretz; Teleplay by : Frank Chase	November 17, 1965
While returning to Shiloh Trampas injures his horse saving a man with a runaway team. He is forced to stay a few days in a small town with the man as an old friend arrives to force the town to sign over its gambling rights to him. Guest Stars: Richard Beymer (Frank Colter), Sherry Jackson (Lois Colter), Leonard Nimoy (Keith Bentley)
100	10	"Beyond the Border"	Don McDougall	Martha Wilkerson	November 24, 1965
On a trip to Mexico with Trampas to pick up six palominos The Virginian becomes sick. He is forced to stay at a lonely saloon and inn tended by the girl friend of a local outlaw. As he recovers, she decides she would prefer life with him. Guest Stars: Thomas Gomez (Fidencio), Joan Staley (Maggie)
101	11	"The Dream of Stavros Karas"	Richard Benedict	A.I. Bezzerides	December 1, 1965
Widower Stavros Karas has agreed with a friend in Greece to marry his daughter. He told his friend he had a nice place but in reality he has little and needs water from his neighbor whose son falls for his young and beautiful bride. Guest Stars: Michael Constantine (Stavros Karas), Louise Sorel (Eleni Niarcos)
102	12	"The Laramie Road"	Charles S. Dubin	Halsted Welles	December 8, 1965
Two tramps kill the wife of Ev Clinchy provoking the ire of Ev and his friend Hezekiah who want to lynch them. The sheriff keeps them at bay but when he is killed it is up to Ryker to protect the men against his close friends for trial. Guest Stars: Leslie Nielsen (Lightfoot), Harold J. Stone (Ev Clinchy), Claude Akins (Hezekiah)
103	13	"The Horse Fighter"	Anton Leader	Richard Fielder	December 15, 1965
A renowned bronc buster is hired to break a group of rough mustangs at Shiloh. He picks Randy who is green to help him and Randy comes to idolize him as they break a black stallion. However, unknown to Randy there is a dark side to man. Guest Stars: Harry Guardino (Sam Willock)
104	14	"Letter of the Law"	Charles S. Dubin	Donn Mullally	December 22, 1965
A dying man clears a man sent to prison but the Governor and the railroad still believe he is guilty. He is paroled but still hounded by a railroad agent. When he is suspected of a second robbery, Ryker is not sure all is as it seems. Guest Stars: Simon Oakland (Charles Sanders)
105	15	"Blaze of Glory"	Alexander Singer	John Hawkins & Ward Hawkins	December 29, 1965
A respected but retired Medicine Bow lawman is trying to make a living for him and his daughter on a farm but the bank is about to foreclose. A man involved in robbing a gold shipment offers him gold for hiding him out. Guest Stars: Leif Erickson (Bill King), Joan Freeman (Judy King)
106	16	"Nobody Said Hello"	Alf Kjellin	Herb Meadow	January 5, 1966
A notorious Civil War criminal defended by Garth arrives in Medicine Bow to join his family. He expects payment from Garth who he believes profited from his case but Garth wants nothing to do with the man but Jennifer befriends the family. Guest Stars: James Whitmore (Capt. Piper Pritikin), Virginia Grey (Laura Pritikin), Steve Carlson (Davis Pritikin)
107	17	"Men with Guns"	Leon Benson	Halsted Welles	January 12, 1966
Trampas and Randy are sent to pick up horses from a rich man illegally evicting people from their property who don't believe in fighting back. Trampas stays as he takes an interest in the leader's daughter who doesn't agree with her father. Guest Stars: Telly Savalas ("Colonel" Bliss), Robert F. Simon (Eric Larsen), Brenda Scott (Gina Larsen)
108	18	"Long Ride to Wind River"	Paul Henreid	Sy Salkowitz	January 19, 1966
The Virginian's friend Benjy is convicted of a murder he swears he didn't commit. A mountain man may be able to clear him but a search doesn't find him. The Virginian decides to follow some clues putting himself and the witness in danger. Guest Stars: John Cassavetes (Jonah MacIntosh)
109	19	"Chaff in the Wind"	Herman Hoffman	Joy Dexter	January 26, 1966
A man and his two adult kids broke and hungry end up at Shiloh when their wagon breaks down. They are grifters but the old man decides to stay at Shiloh. The kids soon like it but don't feel they fit in not knowing their dad is scheming. Guest Stars: Ed Begley (Micah Ellis), Tony Bill (Clipper Ellis), Linda Lawson (Becky Ellis)
110	20	"The Inchworm's Got No Wings at All"	Paul Stanley	Written by : Herman Miller; Story by : Allan Sloane	February 2, 1966
Jennifer learns by accident a hand has a learning challenged sister who is near adulthood but hidden from society. She convinces the parents to let her help the girl but the girl's involvement with a bank robber complicates the problem. Guest Stars: Stacey Maxwell (Marcy Tait)
111	21	"Morgan Starr"	Anton Leader	Herman Miller & Barry Oringer	February 9, 1966
Morgan Starr takes over for Judge Garth running Shiloh. His hardnosed demeanor doesn't sit well with anyone on or off the ranch. His introduction is made harder by a locust plague when Starr decides to stay and fight them rather than move the cattle. Guest Stars: John Dehner (Morgan Starr)
112	22	"Harvest of Strangers"	Paul Stanley	Leon Tokatyan	February 16, 1966
As Ryker leaves town for a few days, a group of men known as Metis arrive in Medicine Bow. They are a rough group but want no trouble. However, the people are afraid of trouble which comes as Starr tries to stop it – from themselves. Guest Stars: John Dehner (Morgan Starr)
113	23	"Ride a Cock-Horse to Laramie Cross"	Anton Leader	Clair Huffaker	February 23, 1966
Trampas becomes knight errant when he takes on two children trying to reach their mother in Laramie. They are being chased by a group of outlaws who want to return them to Mexico. A woman he adds on the way makes it feel like a family. Guest Stars: Nita Talbot (Melinda)
114	24	"One Spring Like Long Ago"	Herman Hoffman	Robert Sabaroff	March 2, 1966
Morgan Starr and Randy Benton travel to sell a herd of cattle to an Indian agent to feed the Dakota, but find themselves on a journey of loss and finding, resulting in a change for many lives but especially for Randy. Guest Stars: John Dehner (Morgan Starr), Eduard Franz (Two Hawks), Warren Oates (Bowers)
115	25	"The Return of Golden Tom"	Anton Leader	Story by : Andy Lewis & Joel Rogosin; Teleplay by : Andy Lewis	March 9, 1966
After 35 years in prison Tom Brant returns to Medicine Bow. A newspaper reporter's story about him stirs the interest of people who had various connections to him. People swarm to him for different reasons including the money he hid. Guest Stars: Victor Jory (Tom Brant), Linden Chiles (Ira Lom)
116	26	"The Wolves Up Front, the Jackals Behind"	Paul Stanley	Herman Miller	March 23, 1966
Randy goes to Montana to pick up a mare and see his childhood friend Georgie Sam with whom he plans to start a horse ranch. Randy is introduced to a rancher's daughter who he falls in love with but her family is suddenly in a crisis. Guest Stars: James Farentino (Frank Colby), Donnelly Rhodes (Ben Colby), Jay C. Flippen (Pa Colby), Peggy Lipton (Dulcie Colby)
117	27	"That Saunders Woman"	William Hale	Story by : Edward DeBlasio; Teleplay by : Don Brinkley	March 30, 1966
The Virginian attempt to recover money Shiloh spent on diseased cattle becomes embroiled in a blackmail attempt and finally murder. A pretty woman is involved who was just released from prison for murder and is the talk of Medicine Bow. Guest Stars: Sheree North (Della Saunders)
118	28	"No Drums, No Trumpets"	Arthur H. Nadel	Story by : Arthur H. Nadel & Robert Sabaroff; Teleplay by : Robert Sabaroff	April 6, 1966
Starr with Trampas agrees to go to Mexico to check the security of a town where A US Senator and a Mexican Governor plan to sign a treat. All looks okay so Trampas leaves but Starr soon finds he is in the middle of an assassination plot. Guest Stars: Leslie Nielsen (Marshal Cleve Mason), John Dehner (Morgan Starr)
119	29	"A Bald-Faced Boy"	Earl Bellamy	Jack Curtis	April 13, 1966
Randy's family visits from the hills of Bald Knob to protect him from a Claiborne who has been released from prison. Randy's testimony helped send him to prison. His daughter a childhood friend of Randy complicates his desire for revenge. Guest Stars: Andrew Prine (Brett Benton), Royal Dano (Dell Benton), Andrew Duggan (Jim Claiborne)
120	30	"The Mark of a Man"	Anton Leader	Harold Swanton	April 20, 1966
The Virginian takes responsibility for a young man he injured when the man vandalized Medicine Bow. The man is intelligent but from a poor background. His girlfriend's wealthy father wants him gone to protect his daughter who is in love. Guest Stars: Harold J. Stone (Jake), Brooke Bundy (Susan McDevitt), Barry Primus (Johnny Younce)

=== Season 5 (1966–67) ===
No. overall	No. in season	Title	Directed by	Written by	Original release date
121	1	"Legacy of Hate"	Don McDougall	Frank Chase	September 14, 1966
The new owner of Shiloh quickly finds his hotheaded grandson accused of cattle rustling. He learns his neighbor is the widow of a friend who died with him. The sullied family name reduces their finance options putting Shiloh in jeopardy. Guest Stars: Jo Van Fleet (Lee Calder), Jeremy Slate (Jim Dawson)
122	2	"Ride to Delphi"	Anton Leader	Story by : Don Tait; Teleplay by : Andy Lewis	September 21, 1966
The Virginian counted 50 cows that were delivered to Grainger but the next morning five of them are missing. The Virginian feeling responsible tracks the stolen cattle down but finds himself arrested on murder charges and can't explain it. Guest Stars: Harold J. Stone (Einar Carlson), Angie Dickinson (Annie Carlson), Warren Oates (Buxton)
123	3	"The Captive"	Don Weis	Peter Packer	September 28, 1966
A white girl is caught with her adoptive Arapaho parents stealing Shiloh cattle. She stays at Shiloh while the authorities try to find her white parents. She wants to return to the Arapaho but is forced to learn to live in the white world. Guest Stars: Susan Strasberg (Liliota / Katherine Ann Emory)
124	4	"An Echo of Thunder"	Abner Biberman	Don Ingalls	October 5, 1966
After helping deliver a herd of horses, Trampas decides to take a few days to visit an old friend nearby but he arrives in time for his friend's funeral. He is bothered by the circumstances of his death, so he decides to investigate. Guest Stars: Linden Chiles (Ben Fancher), John Anderson (Deputy / Sam Murrel), Jason Evers (Sheriff Harry Lundee), Indus Arthur (Margaret Lundee)
125	5	"Jacob Was a Plain Man"	Don McDougall	Eric Bercovici	October 12, 1966
Jake who can't hear or speak runs after he accidentally kills a man in a bar. He lands at Shiloh where his hard work results in a job. Stacey seeing Jake can't express himself decides to teach him to read and write but puts him in danger. Guest Stars: Aldo Ray (Jake Walker)
126	6	"The Challenge"	Don McDougall	Story by : Joy Dexter; Teleplay by : Joy Dexter & Harry Kronman	October 19, 1966
After a stagecoach holdup and accident, Trampas stumbles into a farm with a concussion and amnesia. The farmer and his two kids tend to Trampas but the white handled gun he is carrying puts him into danger from the law and the outlaws. Guest Stars: Dan Duryea (Ben Crayton), Don Galloway (Jim Tyson), Michael Burns (Bobby Crayton), Barbara Anderson (Sarah Crayton)
127	7	"Outcast"	Alan Crosland Jr.	Lou Shaw	October 26, 1966
A man wanted for murder and robbery escapes jail and ends up in Medicine Bow where he befriends Stacey in a fight. He goes to work at Shiloh as a ranch hand and Elizabeth takes an interest in him. However, Stacey is less certain about him. Guest Stars: Fabian (Charley Ryan)
128	8	"Trail to Ashley Mountain"	Abner Biberman	Sy Salkowitz	November 2, 1966
Trampas leads a two man posse to capture the brother-in-law of a friend in jail who is innocent when the Sheriff is injured. They encounter others who hinder their progress and an unhappy couple. But the big problem is Trampas' partner. Guest Stars: Martin Milner (Case), George Kennedy (Harkness), Hugh Marlowe (Ed Wells), Raymond St. Jacques (Allerton), Jackie Coogan (Bodie), Gene Evans (Blanchard), Steve Carlson (Willy Parker)
129	9	"Deadeye Dick"	Ida Lupino	Joseph Hoffman	November 9, 1966
A woman visits her sister in Medicine Bow bringing her teenage daughter who is enamored with a Dead Eye Dick western novel. She develops a crush on The Virginian after he settles her horse aggravating a teenage boy she meets who likes her.
130	10	"High Stakes"	Thomas Carr	Written by : True Boardman; Story by : Mark Rodgers; Teleplay by : Mark Rodgers	November 16, 1966
When a friend of The Virginian is killed and the posse won't follow the killer out of the county, The Virginian goes alone. He tracks the killer and a woman involved to a remote outlaw controlled town but can he get them back to the law? Guest Stars: Terry Moore (Alma Wilson), Jack Lord (Roy Dallman), Michael Ansara (Paul Dallman), Dirk Rambo (Wesley Hedges)
131	11	"Beloved Outlaw"	William Witney	True Boardman	November 23, 1966
A wild white stallion draws the attention of Elizabeth who convinces her grandfather to buy it. Against his wishes, she tames and breaks the stallion when Trampas is unable to. She and the stallion become inseparable but a problem occurs.
132	12	"Linda"	Don McDougall	Written by : Frank Fenton; Story by : Cy Chermak	November 30, 1966
Upon returning from Texas The Virginian finds himself in the middle of express line holdup. On the stagecoach he meets a beautiful woman who ultimately confides in him that she is a courier carrying a package – possibly illegal. Guest Stars: Diane Baker (Linda Valence)
133	13	"The Long Way Home"	Abner Biberman	Written by : Andy Lewis; Story by : Ken Finley	December 14, 1966
Jim Boyer Sr. returns to his wife and son living in Medicine Bow and takes a job at Shiloh. Boyer is a very capable but ignores detail in his work as he tries to earn the foreman job at another ranch Grainger is hoping to purchase. Guest Stars: Pernell Roberts (Jim Boyer, Sr.), Michael Burns (Jim Boyer, Jr.), Noah Beery Jr. (Ed Simpson)
134	14	"The Girl on the Glass Mountain"	Don McDougall	Story by : James L. Henderson; Teleplay by : Eric Bercovici & James L. Henderson	December 28, 1966
Howie is leaving his free life on the range to marry the beautiful Donna whose father is a leading businessman. Once married, they move into a new saddle shop Howie starts. He finds the life confining and gambles away the payment on it. Guest Stars: Tom Tryon (Howie Sheppard), Pamela Austin (Donna Maguire/Sheppard)
135	15	"Vengeance Trail"	Thomas Carr	John Hawkins & Ward Hawkins	January 4, 1967
Stacey is forced to kill a man who tries to rob him. He returns the body to the man's sister who asks Stacey to leave rather than see the Sheriff. She is afraid their younger brother who joins the Shiloh cattle drive will try for revenge. Guest Stars: Ron Russell (Toby Willard), Mary Ann Mobley (Ellie Willard)
136	16	"Sue Ann"	Gerald Mayer	Story by : Gabrielle Upton; Teleplay by : True Boardman & Gabrielle Upton	January 11, 1967
Sue Ann leads a dull life as the daughter of a homesteader taking care of her father, two young brothers, and their hired hand Joe who would like to marry her. However, she leaves home to see San Francisco but where will she get the money? Guest Stars: Patty Duke (Sue Ann MacRea), Edward Binns (Pa MacRea)
137	17	"Yesterday's Timepiece"	Abner Biberman	Story by : Al Ramrus, Sy Salkowitz & John Herman Shaner; Teleplay by : Sy Salkowitz	January 18, 1967
Stacey buys a gold watch that may have belonged to his dead dad. It sets him off on a journey to find the truth about his parents' deaths. He meets an orphaned girl who owned the watch and is curious about her parents who she never knew. Guest Stars: Andy Devine (Amos Tyke), Stu Erwin (Williams), Audrey Totter (Mrs. Archer), Pat O'Brien (Doc Ernest Bigelow), Henry Brandon (Swift Wolf), Kelly Jean Peters (Elaine Potter)
138	18	"Requiem for a Country Doctor"	Don McDougall	Story by : Judith Barrows & Robert Guy Barrows; Teleplay by : Chester Krumholz	January 25, 1967
The Virginian looks for Stacey in a town where they are to finish up a cattle deal. His search results in finding Stacey in jail found guilty of murder. He is to hang the next morning forcing The Virginian to find the real killer fast. Guest Stars: Debbie Watson (Lucy Marsh), Cloris Leachman (Clara Baines), John Doucette (Lumberfield)
139	19	"The Modoc Kid"	Abner Biberman	Leslie Stevens	February 1, 1967
After holding up the bank, Dell Stetler and his partner hold the Graingers hostage at Shiloh to help their wounded comrade. John is forced to bring the doctor to Shiloh to tend to the man as he and Stacey plot a way to free themselves. Guest Stars: John Saxon (Dell Stettler), Harrison Ford (Cullen Tindell)
140	20	"The Gauntlet"	Thomas Carr	Lou Shaw	February 8, 1967
The Virginian is shot crossing a large Texas ranch. The owner taking him in tries to hire him to be his own foreman. The owner likes to make his own rules putting him at odds with his wife over their son and the running of a gauntlet. Guest Stars: Mark Richman (Al Keets), Marian Moses (May Keets)
141	21	"Without Mercy"	Don McDougall	Donn Mullally	February 15, 1967
Stacey has developed an interest in a girl but her father doesn't approve of him. After dragging Stacey, the father is found shot in the back. When the $300 he was carrying is found in Stacey's saddle bags, Stacey is charged with murder. Guest Stars: James Gregory (Cal Young), Lonny Chapman (Donovan Young)
142	22	"Melanie"	Abner Biberman	Stephen Lord	February 22, 1967
An old and successful friend and his daughter from Chicago visit the Graingers. John is surprised when he learns they want to stay in the area. The high society daughter falls in love with Trampas who doesn't know about her secret illness. Guest Stars: Victor Jory (Jim Kohler), Susan Clark (Melanie Kohler)
143	23	"Doctor Pat"	Don McDougall	True Boardman	March 1, 1967
Dr. Spaulding decides to hire another doctor to help share the load but he is unsure whether the attractive female doctor he is sent will work out. The Virginian takes a strong interest in her and her problems as she tries to adapt. Guest Stars: Jill Donahue (Dr. Patricia O'Neill), Mari Blanchard (Marie Coulter)
144	24	"Nightmare at Fort Killman"	Abner Biberman	John Hawkins & Ward Hawkins	March 8, 1967
Stacey is shanghaied in Medicine Bow to take the place of a cavalry recruit. An inept officer allows two sergeants to keep up the facade that Stacey is a recruit while putting him through inhumane conditions to keep him quiet. Guest Stars: James Daly (Sergeant Joe Trapp), Les Crane (Captain McDowell)
145	25	"Bitter Harvest"	Don McDougall	Andy Lewis	March 15, 1967
The Virginian travels to Winton to buys oats for Shiloh. He finds himself in the middle of a fight between the farmers and ranchers with the owner of the oats at the core of the fight with a rancher who is a close friend of John Grainger. Guest Stars: Whitney Blake (Marie Adams), Larry Pennell (Carl Rand), John Lupton (Frank Adams)
146	26	"A Welcoming Town"	Abner Biberman	Story by : Norman Jolley & William Talman; Teleplay by : Sy Salkowitz	March 22, 1967
Trampas goes to visit Ida Martin and son Joe who he lived with as a child. Having not seen them in a few years he finds their place deserted. When he learns Joe was killed by a posse, he can't believe the reason given for his death. Guest Stars: Robert Fuller (Clint Richards), Frank Overton (Sam Atkins), Carole Wells (Kathy Atkins), Lynda Day (Judy Atkins)
147	27	"The Girl on the Pinto"	Don McDougall	Story by : Theodore Apstein; Teleplay by : Theodore Apstein & Seeleg Lester	March 29, 1967
Trampas tries to make friends with a beautiful girl he spots riding a pinto but she avoids him. Once he learns who she is, he asks her to a dance but her and her family are hesitant. Eventually she agrees to go but old issues haunt her.
148	28	"Lady of the House"	Abner Biberman	Leslie Stevens	April 5, 1967
John Grainger asks an old friend from Maryland to come to Shiloh to take the rough edges off his grandkids. She does as he asks quite well but is less than popular with the kids and The Virginian. Unknown to them, she has a secret plan. Guest Stars: Myrna Loy (Mrs. Miles)
149	29	"The Strange Quest of Claire Bingham"	Don McDougall	True Boardman & Joseph Hoffman	April 12, 1967
A nurse comes to Medicine Bow so see if an outlaw Ryker captured might be her brother as they were both orphaned at an early age. When he escapes and is shot, he uses her feelings to get help as Ryker who is attracted to her pursues him. Guest Stars: Andrew Prine (Chuck Larson), Sandra Smith (Claire Bingham)

=== Season 6 (1967–68) ===
No. overall	No. in season	Title	Directed by	Written by	Original release date
150	1	"Reckoning"	Abner Biberman	Ed Waters	September 13, 1967
The Virginian, John and Elizabeth goes to Texas where The Virginian is seen by members of a gang whose leader thinks The Virginian is responsible for the death of his brother seven years earlier. Elizabeth is kidnapped to trap him. Guest Stars: Dick Foran (Frank Devereaux), Charles Bronson (Harge Talbot), Charles Grodin (Arnie Doud)
151	2	"The Deadly Past"	Abner Biberman	Phyllis White & Robert White	September 20, 1967
After receiving the third letter with his name on a list of people being killed, Trampas decides to learn who is after him. He meets a gunfighter who is on the list. Together they are trying to solve the mystery which involves his ex-wife. Guest Stars: Darren McGavin (Sam Evans), Linden Chiles (Sheriff Chris Williams)
152	3	"The Lady From Wichita"	Don McDougall	True Boardman	September 27, 1967
The owner of a ranch next to Shiloh dies leaving his entire estate to a woman who runs a saloon in Wichita. Her and her partner go to Medicine Bow expecting to sell the ranch but she decides to stay on the ranch despite their background. Guest Stars: Joan Collins (Lorna Marie Marshall), Rose Marie (Belle Stephens)
153	4	"Star Crossed"	Abner Biberman	Don Tait	October 4, 1967
An old friend of Ryker's settles on a ranch with a new wife and stepson under a new name due to being wanted. Ryker helps him but loses his job when the man confesses to killing a Shiloh hand who was blackmailing him due to his past. Guest Stars: Tom Tryon (Andrew Hiller), Lisabeth Hush (Judith Hiller), Kiel Martin (Tony Barnes)
154	5	"Johnny Moon"	Abner Biberman	Stanford Whitmore	October 11, 1967
The Virginian rescues a man who has been shot. As he recovers at Shiloh he and the Grainger kids realize the man is a bit different as well as being from England. A private detective looking for him provides a clue to his background. Guest Stars: Tom Bell (Johnny Moon), Ben Johnson (Hogan), Michael Higgins (Lawson), Bo Hopkins (Will)
155	6	"The Masquerade"	Don McDougall	Norman Katkov	October 18, 1967
Bank teller George Foster has told his ex-lawman dad he is a sheriff to make him proud. When his father is to stop by for a two hour visit, Ryker and The Virginian decide to make him Sheriff but they didn't expect the visit to be extended. Guest Stars: Lloyd Nolan (Tom Foster), David Hartman (George Foster), Diana Muldaur (Laura Messinger)
156	7	"Ah Sing vs. Wyoming"	Charles S. Dubin	Irve Tunick	October 25, 1967
The Grainger Chinese cook Ah Sing wants to open a restaurant in Medicine Bow in preparation for the arrival of a new wife. However, the Justice of Peace refuses to issue him a license because he is Chinese leading a high level fight. Guest Stars: Edmond O'Brien (Thomas Manstead), Aki Aleong (Ah Sing), Lloyd Bochner (Luke Evers)
157	8	"Bitter Autumn"	Don McDougall	Written by : Andy Lewis & David E. Lewis; Story by : Ken Finley	November 1, 1967
Clay and Holly Grainger take over for John as a herd from Texas is brought in by Kyle Jackson and his brothers. However, things turn tragic when Trampas discovers the herd is sick and a brother accidentally kills the wife of an ex-lawman. Guest Stars: John McIntire (Clay Grainger), John Anderson (Sam McLain), Richard X. Slattery (Kyle Jackson), Jeanette Nolan (Holly Grainger), Steve Carlson (Willy Jackson)
158	9	"A Bad Place to Die"	Don McDougall	Judith Barrows & Robert Guy Barrows	November 8, 1967
Trampas is sentenced to hang for a murder he didn't commit. The Virginian and Stacey try to find new evidence while Clay Grainger and the attorney try for a new trial. Meanwhile, a desperate Trampas escapes prison with his cell mate. Guest Stars: John McIntire (Clay Grainger), Victor Jory (Luke Nichols)
159	10	"Paid in Full"	Don McDougall	Richard Wendley	November 22, 1967
Frank returns from prison to find his father crippled after saving Trampas and working at a low level job for Clay Grainger. Frank accepts a job but his attitude toward Trampas and Grainger push him toward getting revenge via rustling. Guest Stars: John McIntire (Clay Grainger), James Whitmore (Ezra Hollis), Don Stroud (Frank Hollis)
160	11	"To Bear Witness"	Abner Biberman	Sy Salkowitz	November 29, 1967
Drunk, disliked Walter Verig is found murdered by Trampas who sees Doc Baldwin ride away from the body in his buggy. Trampas is first suspected due to a bloody hand but suspicion soon falls on Baldwin. Trampas tries to prove his innocence. Guest Stars: John McIntire (Clay Grainger), William Windom (Arthur Blanton), Joanna Moore (Carol Fisk), Malachi Throne (Dr. Baldwin)
161	12	"The Barren Ground"	Abner Biberman	Written by : Andy Lewis; Story by : Joy Dexter	December 6, 1967
The Virginian returns a man he killed to his crippled father. After helping bury the body, the man has a heart attack. He asks The Virginian to try to bring his daughter back from the Shoshone to inherit his farm – with The Virginian. Guest Stars: John McIntire (Clay Grainger), Jay C. Flippen (Asa Keogh), Colin Wilcox (Sarah Keogh)
162	13	"Execution at Triste"	Robert L. Friend	John Dunkel	December 13, 1967
Trampas and two hands deliver cattle to a remote Army outpost. Trampas runs into an old friend who is a gunfighter in a nearby town where Trampas must pick up the payment. However, his friend has his eye on killing Trampas for no reason. Guest Stars: Robert Lansing (Lee Knight), Sharon Farrell (Mavis), Burt Douglas (Burt)
163	14	"A Small Taste of Justice"	Don McDougall	Edward J. Lakso	December 20, 1967
Returning to Shiloh, The Virginian has his horse and gun stolen by a man and his hands who have the local town cowered. He meets an old friend in the town who helps convince him to help arrest them after her daughter is injured by them. Guest Stars: Peter Brown (Tom Conlan), Susan Oliver (Ellen Cooper), John Lupton (John Cooper)
164	15	"The Fortress"	Abner Biberman	Story by : W.R. Burnett & Sy Salkowitz; Teleplay by : Sy Salkowitz	December 27, 1967
The Virginian takes a herd to a town on the border with Canada but the bank is robbed making his bank draft worthless. He tracks the robbers into Canada to recover the $100,000 but they work for the buyer of the beef at his empire. Guest Stars: John McIntire (Clay Grainger), Leslie Nielsen (Winthrop), Barbara Bouchet (Francoise), Kipp Hamilton (Gloria)
165	16	"The Death Wagon"	E. Darrell Hallenbeck	James Menzies	January 3, 1968
First Trampas and then Holly and Elizabeth encounter a military prison wagon crossing Shiloh land carrying a prisoner who appears to have scarlet fever. When he escapes, they are worried who may be infected with the disease. Guest Stars: John McIntire (Clay Grainger), Albert Salmi (Corporal C.T. Smoot), Michael Constantine (Private Essex Kanin), Tim McIntire (Marcus Veda)
166	17	"Jed"	Abner Biberman	Arthur Heinemann	January 10, 1968
Clay tries to prevent a range war between the ranchers and homesteaders who are blocking their path to market. A hothead rancher hires a gunfighter on the sly who happens to be an old friend of Trampas who falls for a homesteader. Guest Stars: Steve Ihnat (Jed Matthews), Brenda Scott (Abby Keifer), Sammy Jackson (Ron Keifer)
167	18	"With Help from Ulysses"	Don McDougall	True Boardman	January 17, 1968
Trampas is sent on a trip followed by a couple days to visit a female friend. On the way he is asked by a dying prospector to find his niece who can only be found by birthmark on her leg. The result is trouble with his female friend. Guest Stars: Barbara Rhoades (Josie), Jill Donohue (Barbara), Eileen Wesson (Betty Martin)
168	19	"The Gentle Tamers"	Anton Leader	Story by : Gil Lasky & Abe Polsky; Teleplay by : Don Tait	January 24, 1968
Clay decides to take on three convicts on parole to test whether they can be rehabilitated at the urging of a prison warden. The three get off to a rocky start as they are obvious misfits with no experience and one has a bad attitude.
169	20	"The Good-Hearted Badman"	James Sheldon	Robert Van Scoyk	February 7, 1968
Elizabeth finds a man shot in the shoulder. Her and Clay return him to Shiloh but the hands are gone. The two plus Holly help the man recover but a bounty hunter arrives looking for his quarry as Elizabeth only sees the good in him. Guest Stars: Peter Deuel (Jim Dewey / Thomas Baker), Jeanette Nolan (Holly Grainger), John Larch (Ben Hicks)
170	21	"The Hell Wind"	Don McDougall	Barbara Merlin & Leonard Praskins	February 14, 1968
Trampas, Stacey and Elizabeth are caught in a sandstorm while returning to Shiloh with a bull. They take refuge in an abandoned homestead where several guests arrive after them with one thing in common – connections to a robbed bank. Guest Stars: Patricia Crowley ("Angela" Pearl Van Owen), Ford Rainey (Marcus Van Owen)
171	22	"The Crooked Path"	Abner Biberman	Story by : Robert Presnell Jr. Teleplay by : Jerrold L. Ludwig	February 21, 1968
Kiley Cheever tired of his dad's treatment heads to Medicine Bow to find his childhood friend Trampas and a job. Kiley's tendency to make up stories and prove his manhood gets him into trouble with everyone but a female visitor to Shiloh.
172	23	"Stacey"	Leo Penn	Douglas Morrow	February 28, 1968
Stacey breaks his arm and injures a nerve in his shoulder during an accident with a girl friend. When his recovery is questionable, she abandons him due to family induced emotional constraints, putting Stacey into a deeper depression.
173	24	"The Handy Man"	Abner Biberman	Mel Tormé	March 6, 1968
A legal fight over a strip of land between Shiloh and the Bowden ranch turns nasty. The fight over cools when the Bowdens mistakenly believe Shiloh has hired a gunfighter but turns serious when they learn he is just a simply handy man. Guest Stars: Tim Simcox (Ward Bowden), Jeanette Nolan (Holly Grainger)
174	25	"The Decision"	E. Darrell Hallenbeck	Richard Carr	March 13, 1968
Sheriff Dan Porter leaves his job in Mason City to follow his wife Emily to Medicine Bow as she can't handle the pressure of his job. He signs on at Shiloh to learn ranching so he can start a ranch and new life with his wife. Guest Stars: Kenneth Tobey (Sheriff Dan Porter), Monica Lewis (Emily "Em" Porter), Steve Carlson (Deputy/Sheriff Frank North), Ben Murphy (Wes Manning)
175	26	"Seth"	Joel Rogosin	Reuben Bercovitch	March 20, 1968
While hunting a cougar, Trampas catches a sick and starving boy stealing his grub. The boy won't say anything other than his name is Seth. He helps Trampas and returns to Shiloh where he stays until they track down his shady uncle. Guest Stars: Michael Burns (Seth / Scott)

=== Season 7 (1968–69) ===
No. overall	No. in season	Title	Directed by	Written by	Original release date
176	1	"The Saddle Warmer"	Charles S. Dubin	Robert Van Scoyk	September 18, 1968
David Sutton takes a job at Shiloh to make up for the work Trampas can't do after being involved in Trampas breaking his leg. He has a hard time fitting in with the other hands while a girl he met earlier tracks him down to help her. Guest Stars: Ralph Bellamy (Jeremiah), Chris Robinson (Coley), Quentin Dean (Saranora), Tom Skerritt (Rafe)
177	2	"Silver Image"	Don McDougall	Story by : Joel Rogosin; Teleplay by : Don Tait	September 25, 1968
Photographer Dan Sheppard arriving at Shiloh to take pictures of western life finds a neighbor ranch is owned by an old girlfriend. She is in a tug of war between an oil speculator and the local ranchers afraid of polluted water. Guest Stars: James Daly (Dan Sheppard), Bob Random (Jeremy Sheppard), Geraldine Brooks (Della Price)
178	3	"The Orchard"	James Sheldon	Written by : Andy Lewis; Story by : Ken Finley	October 2, 1968
Tim Bradbury wants to recreate the cattle ranch he had in Texas and feels Clay Grainger owes him the help. His son Walt wants to farm instead while his son Mike who works at Shiloh puts the family in financial peril with his gambling. Guest Stars: Burgess Meredith (Tim Bradbury), William Windom (Chick Mead), Brandon deWilde (Walt Bradbury), Ben Murphy (Mike Bradbury)
179	4	"Vision of Blindness"	Abner Biberman	Story by : Gerald Sanford; Teleplay by : James Menzies & Gerald Sanford	October 9, 1968
Elizabeth is blinded by a stagecoach accident. She is found by Ben Oakes who wanted to kill Trampas who had to miss the stage. Ben tries to help her home but becomes lost. After they are found, She is in love with the conflicted Ben. Guest Stars: John Saxon (Ben Oakes), Ben Johnson (Jed Cooper), The Irish Rovers
180	5	"The Wind of Outrage"	James Sheldon	Alvin Sapinsley	October 16, 1968
The Virginian and Trampas are to meet a man on business near the Canadian border. They have to stay over at a remote hotel due to a storm where Trampas finds a woman who robbed him years ago and Metis rebels who are after her fiancé. The character Louis Boissevain appears to be real-life Louis Riel of the Riel Rebellion, as the story seems to represent his circumstances in Montana pretty closely at the time, while also depicting a fictional version of his reasons for returning to Canada from exile in 1884. Guest Stars: Ricardo Montalbán (Louis Boissevain), Lois Nettleton (Suzanne Mayo), Lawrence Dane (Jacques)
181	6	"Image of an Outlaw"	Don McDougall	Joseph Hoffman	October 23, 1968
Shiloh hand Rafe Judson is mistaken for an outlaw as the two men look identical. When Rafe loses an option on a ranch due to a lack of funds, he decides to take advantage of the situation to rob a stagecoach without taking the blame. Guest Stars: Don Stroud (Rafe Judson / Wally McCullough), Amy Thomson (Angie Becker)
182	7	"The Heritage"	Leo Penn	Stephen Lord	October 30, 1968
The Shoshone girl Nai'Be returns to Medicine Bow from an eastern school as a young lady but conflicted on her future. Her childhood sweetheart Tza'Wuda is waiting for her as is a conflict with a rancher forcing her tribe to move its camp. Guest Stars: Buffy Sainte-Marie (Nai'Be)
183	8	"Ride to Misadventure"	Michael Caffey	Gerald Sanford	November 6, 1968
Shiloh and its neighbor's cattle herds are threaten by an outbreak of anthrax. A wounded man and woman wanting horses tell Clay the stage with a vaccine was robbed and they are chasing the outlaw gang so The Virginian and David join them. Guest Stars: Joseph Campanella ("Walker"), Katherine Justice (Ruby French)
184	9	"The Storm Gate"	Richard A. Colla	Story by : Jerry McNeely; Teleplay by : Jerry McNeely & Alvin Sapinsley	November 13, 1968
Trampas receives an unfriendly reception when the tries to visit an old friend. Once he finally sees Jason, he learns not all is as it seems. They clash over the building of a dam in Nebraska after Trampas learns about an earlier dam. Guest Stars: Susan Oliver (Anne Crowder), Burr DeBenning (Jason Crowder), Scott Brady (Hudson)
185	10	"The Dark Corridor"	Abner Biberman	Story by : Jean Holloway & Joel Rogosin; Teleplay by : Jean Holloway	November 27, 1968
The Virginian on a rare trip to visit a friend Jingo in a remote valley when he finds a woman unconscious. At Jingo's cabin she recovers from a fear induced catatonic state but with amnesia but thinks The Virginian is her lover. Guest Stars: Judith Lang (The Girl), John Smith (Ellis), Paul Winchell (Jingo)
186	11	"The Mustangers"	Charles S. Dubin	Norman Jolley	December 4, 1968
The Virginian and David are to pick up a herd of horses Shiloh needs for a cattle drive. The horses are stolen from the seller so they must catch and break a new herd but a conflict between a father and his son over his future intervenes. Guest Stars: James Edwards (Ben Harper), John Agar (Joe Williams), Don Knight (Cal Hobson), Chuck Daniel (Dewey Harper)
187	12	"Nora"	Don McDougall	True Boardman	December 11, 1968
Clay's old sweetheart Nora and her husband a Major in the Army stop at Shiloh. Nora tries to impress everyone with herself and her down to earth husband. She is willing to put others lives on the line to help her husband win a promotion. Guest Stars: Anne Baxter (Nora Carlton), Hugh Beaumont (Major James Carlton), Tim McIntire (Lt. Tim O'Hara)
188	13	"Big Tiny"	James Sheldon	Story by : Joy Dexter; Teleplay by : Norman Katkov & Joy Dexter	December 18, 1968
Trampas and David are sent to buy a bull at Durango for Shiloh. The Virginian vouches to Clay that Trampas can be relied on but it is David who finds himself in trouble. He agrees to be engaged to a woman he bumps into on the street. Guest Stars: Julie Sommars (Martha Carson), Roger Torrey (Tiny Morgan)
189	14	"Stopover"	Joel Rogosin	John Kneubuhl	January 8, 1969
Gunman Frank Hammel's arrival on the stage upsets people in Medicine Bow who believe he may be after them. Having saved The Virginian's life ten years earlier, The Virginian takes an active role in calming fears and stopping any killing. Guest Stars: Herb Jeffries (Frank Hammel), Jan Shepard (Laura Cooper), John Kellogg (Mel Dover), Jay C. Flippen (Judge)
190	15	"Death Wait"	Charles S. Dubin	Gerald Sanford	January 15, 1969
David kills a man in self-defense on Shiloh who stole his girlfriend. He is forced to stay at Shiloh as the man's father and brother wait for him in Medicine Bow as Trampas who is in charge encounters unusual problems on the ranch. Guest Stars: Harold J. Stone (Grant Buchanan), Sheila Larken (Ellen Jones), Murray MacLeod (Lorne Buchanan)
191	16	"Last Grave at Socorro Creek"	Leo Penn	Story by : Nat Tanchuck; Teleplay by : David Levinson & Stanford Whitmore	January 22, 1969
The Virginian sees Bill Burden with two other men who are returning money from selling ranchers' herds. The two leave together but the money is stolen and Bill is lynched. The Virginian wants revenge when he is too late to clear Bill. Guest Stars: Steve Ihnat (Four-Eyes), Lonny Chapman (Carl Luther), Ellen McRae (Kate Burden), Kevin Coughlin (Dan Burden)
192	17	"Crime Wave at Buffalo Springs"	Charles S. Dubin	Robert Van Scoyk	January 29, 1969
After a fight with Trampas, David leaves. He finds himself not only robbed of his clothes and horse by bank robbers but arrested for the robbery himself. Trampas who followed to get him to return, finds himself in the same jail cell. Guest Stars: Yvonne De Carlo (Imogene Delphinia), Carrie Snodgrass (Josephine Delphinia), Ann Prentiss (Geraldine Delphinia), James Brolin (Ned Trumbull), Gary Vinson (Sheriff Tom Wade), Tom Bosley (Nat Trumbull), The Irish Rovers
193	18	"The Price of Love"	Michael Caffey	Richard Carr	February 12, 1969
An orphan who lived with the Graingers in Texas 15 years earlier comes through Medicine Bow. He decides to stay and work for them and is very protective of the Graingers but his years away from them have changed him – in a bad way. Guest Stars: Peter Deuel (Denny Todd), James Gregory (Kimbro)
194	19	"The Ordeal"	Michael Caffey	Story by : Merwin Gerard; Teleplay by : Don Ingalls	February 19, 1969
Easterner Scott Austin is sent to Shiloh for the summer as a favor to his wealthy father who is a friend of Clay. The hope is that Scott will develop character. With Clay gone the job falls to The Virginian who has his hands full. Guest Stars: Robert Pine (Scott Austin)
195	20	"The Land Dreamer"	James Sheldon	Robert Van Scoyk	February 26, 1969
A dispute ends with one man dead, the Sheriff unconscious, and the shooter on the run. The Virginian, Trampas, and David catch the shooter with his family. The softhearted David wants to let the shooter go but The Virginian won't go along. Guest Stars: James Olson (Hosea McKinley), Cloris Leachman (Ellen McKinley), Don Francks (Caleb and Jack Welles)
196	21	"Eileen"	Anton Leader	Don Ingalls	March 5, 1969
Eileen Linden is visiting for six weeks with her father's friend Clay Grainger. In an agreement with her father, she is to spend the time away from a man she wants to marry. The man shows up at Shiloh with a hidden purpose. Guest Stars: Debbie Watson (Eileen Linden), Richard Van Vleet (Peter Bowers)
197	22	"Incident at Diablo Crossing"	William Witney	Story by : Andrew Blanc & Margaret Blanc; Teleplay by : Andrew Blanc, Margaret Blanc & Joel Rogosin	March 12, 1969
Tramps takes a stage on a trip. During the trip they hear Arapaho may be loose plus two soldiers with a payroll join it. They find the ferryman dead and a man by the body at a water stop. At the ferry crossing there is more trouble. Guest Stars: Gary Collins (Jason Adams), Kiel Martin (Trooper Rankin), Lee Kroeger (Marcy McLister), Steve Carlson (Bud McLister), Bernie Hamilton (Corporal Harvey), Anthony Caruso (Sam Mason)
198	23	"Storm Over Shiloh"	Michael Caffey	Frank Chase	March 19, 1969
When Elizabeth is late returning from a ride for dinner and her horse returns alone, the Graingers, The Virginian, and Trampas go looking for her. A storm impedes them until a clue takes them to an abandoned mine that has caved in.
199	24	"The Girl in the Shadows"	James Sheldon	Story by : Phyllis White & Robert White; Teleplay by : George Kirgo, Joseph Monzio, Irv Pearlberg, Robert Van Scoyk, Phyllis White & Robert White	March 26, 1969
Claire Garson and Nathaniel E. 'Doc' Watson have an act in which Claire appears to read minds. They receive an offer which involves them in going to Medicine Bow. Claire is to "meet" the Graingers and reveal she might be Clay's niece. Guest Stars: Jack Albertson (Nathaniel E. "Doc" Watson) Brenda Scott (Claire Garson)
200	25	"Fox, Hound, and the Widow McCloud"	Don McDougall	Judith Barrows	April 2, 1969
Luke Nichols arrives at Shiloh looking for Trampas tracked by bounty hunter Bracken. Luke helped Trampas break out of prison when he was about to hang. Trampas tries to hide him with the widow McCloud who has a heart of stone – at first. Guest Stars: Victor Jory (Luke Nichols), Troy Donahue (Bracken), Jean Inness (Clarissa McCloud)
201	26	"The Stranger"	Michael Caffey	Mel Goldberg	April 9, 1969
The Virginian meets the loner, Garrison, on the trail and decides to hire him even though he doesn't socialize well with others. When Sam Marish who had a run in with Garrison is killed during a robbery, Garrison is arrested and tried. Guest Stars: Shelly Novack (Garrison)

=== Season 8 (1969–70) ===
No. overall	No. in season	Title	Directed by	Written by	Original release date
202	1	"Long Ride Home"	Charles S. Dubin	Richard Fielder	September 17, 1969
Holly finds two cowboys who are looking for work. The younger hand Jim looks up to Ben as the only father he has ever known as the two roam around looking for a place to settle. Ben isn't ready to settle down but Jim may have found a home. Guest Stars: Leslie Nielsen (Ben Stratton)
203	2	"A Flash of Darkness"	Joseph Pevney	Edward J. Lakso	September 24, 1969
The Virginian is hurt on a horse drive when his horse stumbles in a creek bed. Blinded by the accident, he stumbles his way into the home of three horse thieves he fired. Guest Stars: James Whitmore (Carl Kabe), Pamela McMyler (Ginny Kabe)
204	3	"Halfway Back from Hell"	Michael Caffey	Story by : James Duff McAdams & Alvin Sapinsley; Teleplay by : Alvin Sapinsley	October 1, 1969
In Arizona Trampas is forced to work as foreman on a ranch staffed by men on probation from prison. The locals want them removed and the US Marshal in charge of the area is less than enthusiastic about them being there as well. Guest Stars: William Windom (Cardine), John Dehner (Marshall Eliazer Teague), Susan Howard (Rebecca Teague), Murray MacLeod (Will Steinbach)
205	4	"The Power Seekers"	Seymour Robbie	Robert Van Scoyk	October 8, 1969
The territorial representative resigns so Clay is drafted to run against a local man. Once in the race Clay learns the dirty side of politics including being lied to about who drafted him. He runs an honest contest but will the other side. Guest Stars: Barry Sullivan (John Springfield), Andrew Prine (Tobe Larkin), Davey Davison (Jenny Larkin)
206	5	"The Family Man"	Joseph Pevney	Arthur Heinemann	October 15, 1969
When the husband of a couple younger than Jim goes on the lam, Jim decides to take over as the breadwinner for the young wife and her new baby he delivers. However, the toil of doing two jobs leads to Jim deciding to quit as emotions grow. Guest Stars: Darleen Carr (Anna Moore), Frank Webb (Obie Moore)
207	6	"The Runaway"	Anton Leader	Gerald Sanford	October 22, 1969
A runaway boy is found on Shiloh who won't talk. They wonder about his parents becoming gravely concerned when they discover he has been severely beaten. No one realizes how close his dad is as the orphanage manager wants him back. Guest Stars: Guy Stockwell (Luke Callahan / Bayo), Peter Whitney (McPherson), Jan Shepard (Claire Martin)
208	7	"A Love to Remember"	Joseph Pevney	Benjamin Masselink	October 29, 1969
Reporter/artist Julie Oakes arrives in Medicine Bow from Boston to do a story on the west. She falls in love with The Virginian but her interest in another man upsets him and results in problems due to her complicated past in Boston. Guest Stars: Diane Baker (Julie Oakes), Fred Beir (Ord Glover)
209	8	"The Substitute"	Anton Leader	Gerald Sanford	November 5, 1969
Trampas leaves on vacation but his plans go astray when he is picked up by a bounty hunter for murdering a popular doctor. He has to contend with a hostile town, planted evidence, and a saloon girl who swears she saw him commit the murder. Guest Stars: Dennis Cooney (Josh Gates), Beverlee McKinsey (Abby Clayton)
210	9	"The Bugler"	Anton Leader	Story by : Jeb Rosebrook; Teleplay by : Gerry Day & Jeb Rosebrook	November 19, 1969
An Army deserter is found and injured on Shiloh after he was whipped by the commanding officer – his father. Being a bugler he gives Elizabeth lessons on a coronet she has found until the Graingers learn the truth about him from the Army. Guest Stars: Michael Burns (Private Toby Hamilton), Morgan Woodward (Colonel Mark Hamilton), Alan Hale Jr. (Sgt. O'Rourke)
211	10	"Home to Methuselah"	Abner Biberman	Story by : Paul Freeman; Teleplay by : Jack Miller	November 26, 1969
An old lawman friend of The Virginian comes to Shiloh to see him and ask him to go on a hunting trip. However, he doesn't say the prey is two outlaws. Once The Virginian learns the truth, he decides to help but is surprised by the target. Guest Stars: Audrey Totter (Audry), John Anderson (Seth James)
212	11	"A Touch of Hands"	Anton Leader	John Dunkel	December 3, 1969
A pig tailed brat returns home from finishing school for a two week vacation as a beautiful woman catching Trampas' eyes again. They fall in love as she remembers the good times but her father wants her to return to school in the east. Guest Stars: Michael Constantine (John Halstead), Belinda Montgomery (Peg Halstead)
213	12	"Journey to Scathelock"	Seymour Robbie	Alvin Sapinsley	December 10, 1969
An emergency recalls The Virginian so he allows Jim Horn to go alone with $4000 to complete a purchase of horses. Everyone takes Jim for a wet behind the ears youngster including the woman and her partner who steal the money he carries. Guest Stars: Burr DeBenning (Orrey), Anne Helm (Karen)
214	13	"A Woman of Stone"	Abner Biberman	Gerry Day	December 17, 1969
A white woman and her son are forced to leave the Shoshone reservation when her Shoshone husband dies. She is found sick on Shiloh. Unknown to everyone her white husband and now engaged daughter live in Medicine Bow thinking she is dead. Guest Stars: Bethel Leslie (Cath), Charles Drake (Milo Cantrell), Tim Holt (Abe Landeen)
215	14	"Black Jade"	Joseph Pevney	Herb Meadow	December 31, 1969
Trampas decides to track down where Cobey Jade obtained a silver watch that belonged to a friend. While with Jade who lives in an abandoned mining town, they are taken captive by a band of roving outlaws who believes Jade found gold there. Guest Stars: William Shatner (Henry Swann), James A. Watson (Cobey Jade), Jill Townsend (Roseanna)
216	15	"You Can Lead a Horse to Water"	James Neilson	Lois Hire	January 7, 1970
Trampas asked to deliver a friendly prisoner to Clearwater by stage finds himself with a stuffy southern belle. When the stage is held up, she forces Trampas and his prisoner to go after the robbers which becomes a lesson in life to her. Guest Stars: Strother Martin (Luther Watson), Elizabeth Hubbard (Mary Charles Marshall), Noah Beery Jr. (Will Baxter)
217	16	"Nightmare"	Robert Gist	Gerry Day & Bethel Leslie	January 21, 1970
The Virginian helps the widow of a local businessman prove her innocence when first her husband is killed in a fire followed by his right hand man who names her as he dies. She has a history of mental illness after her first husband died. Guest Stars: Joan Crawford (Stephanie White)
218	17	"Holocaust (aka The Shiloh Years)"	Jeannot Szwarc	Written by : Robert Van Scoyk; Story by : James Duff McAdams	January 28, 1970
An eastern combine wants to take over the Wyoming cattle market with Shiloh in the middle of their sights. A burned Shiloh and delayed cattle drive leads to a loss on the sale of cattle resulting in all the Shiloh hands being laid off. Guest Stars: Tony Franciosa (Kordick), Harold J. Stone (Adam Southcort)
219	18	"Train of Darkness"	James Sheldon	Robert Van Scoyk	February 4, 1970
Clay, Elizabeth, and Jim along with a small number of other passengers ride the train from Cheyenne to Medicine Bow. During the trip they get to know each other only to learn one is hiding a past that causes the train to be stopped. Guest Stars: Dennis Weaver (Jed Haines / Judge Haker), John Larch (Charles Neely), Kaz Garas (Buster Floyd), Barbara Werle (Evangeline Madden Neely), Gerald S. O'Loughlin (Luke Darmer Sr.)
220	19	"A Time of Terror"	Joseph Pevney	Edward J. Lakso	February 11, 1970
The Graingers are taken hostage by two brothers and their sister to get access to a friend of Clay who is a Judge running for the legislature. They blame him for killing their father and stealing their family farm for a railroad. Guest Stars: Joseph Cotten (Judge Will McMasters), Shelly Novack (Frank)
221	20	"No War for the Warrior"	Don McDougall	Story by : Robert Earll; Teleplay by : Robert Earll & Alvin Sapinsley	February 18, 1970
The Virginian picks up a hand John on the trail who becomes friends with Jim but is half Kiowa running from the Army for killing four soldiers. He wants to go to Canada to live free but Jim faces a lynching for a man John killed. Guest Stars: Henry Jones (Ned Cochran), Charles Aidman (William Webb), Charles Knox Robinson (John Wood), David Sheiner (Cully)
222	21	"A King's Ransom"	Joseph Pevney	John D.F. Black	February 25, 1970
Clay is kidnapped by three gang members for a $20,000 ransom or the threat of his death and the burning of Medicine Bow. Adding to the situation is the wife of the gang leader staying at Shiloh in order to escape him but he wants her back. Guest Stars: Patrick Macnee ("Conn" Connor), Jackie DeShannon (Mag)
223	22	"The Sins of the Fathers"	Walter Doniger	David P. Harmon	March 4, 1970
The Virginian and Shiloh money are rescued by a lone man who he rewards with a job at Shiloh. He rubs the other men the wrong way, works hard, but is obviously a gunman. Clay Grainger soon realizes who he is but won't let him be fired. Guest Stars: Robert Lipton (Adam Randall), Tim McIntire (John Wesley Hardin)
224	23	"Rich Man, Poor Man"	Anton Leader	Arthur Heinemann	March 11, 1970
Poor Harve Yost turns into rich Harve when he finds a dying man with a saddle bag full of money and gets a $10000 reward. Never a man to manage money or time The Virginian advises him to buy a ranch but Harve tries to rival Shiloh. Guest Stars: Jack Elam (Harv Yost), Patricia Morrow (Ellie Yost), Michael Larrain (Whit Yost)
225	24	"The Gift"	Seymour Robbie	Robert Van Scoyk	March 18, 1970
Jim Horn becomes involved with a roving saloon singer who had a similar involvement with Trampas three years earlier. A train payroll robber dying in her room complicates their lives when she is assumed to hold the missing money. Guest Stars: Tab Hunter (Cart Banner), Julie Gregg (Sally Anne), Frank Marth (Rawlings)

=== Season 9 (1970–71) ===
The ninth season aired as The Men From Shiloh.

No. overall	No. in season	Title	Directed by	Written by	Original release date
226	1	"The West vs. Colonel MacKenzie"	Jerry Hopper	Jean Holloway	September 16, 1970
Shiloh's new owner arrives on the same train as five men who The Virginian recognizes from wanted posters. He fears they are involved in a potential range war between the big and small ranges resulting in multiple lynchings. Guest Stars: Elizabeth Ashley (Faith), Bobby Eilbacher (Petey), Martha Hyer (Amalia), Don DeFore (Mayor Evans), John Larch (Sheriff)
227	2	"The Best Man"	Russ Mayberry	Leslie Stevens	September 23, 1970
Trampas and Pick Lexington visit old friends in Mexico. Trampas is caught between Pick and one of his Mexican friends as both men fall for the same girl. He hopes to stop them from dueling each other while the girl chooses between them. Guest Stars: Desi Arnaz ("El Jefe" Zaragosa), James Farentino (Pick Lexingon), Katy Jurado ("Mama" Fe Zaragosa)
228	3	"Jenny"	Harry Harris	Arthur Heinemann	September 30, 1970
The Virginian helps a woman being attacked in her hotel room only to learn she is an old girlfriend. They are on a stage together which loses a wheel in the desert stranding them while being chased by the men but she won't say why. Guest Stars: Janet Leigh (Jenny Davis), John Ireland (Kinroy), Charles Drake (Jeremy "Randolf")
229	4	"With Love, Bullets, and Valentines"	Philip Leacock	Glen A. Larson	October 7, 1970
Trampas wins a steamboat in a poker game on a steamboat but the money is confiscated for being stolen. When he tries to collect on the steamboat he won, he finds himself involved with an outlaw gang and a crooked boat owner. Guest Stars: Art Carney (Skeet), Tom Ewell (Hoy Valentine), Deborah Walley (Corey Ann Skeet), Jack Albertson (Billy Valentine)
230	5	"The Mysterious Mr. Tate"	Abner Biberman	Jean Holloway	October 14, 1970
Col. MacKenzie rescues a man, Tate (Lee Majors), from a lynching for a shooting he saw to be self-defense. MacKenzie is traveling on a train with the young daughter of a friend who believes she is in love with Tate who has an outlaw background. This is the first episode to include Roy Tate, although Lee Majors had been shown in the opening credits since the start of the season. Guest Stars: Robert Webber (Jackson Reed), Dane Clark (Barton Ellis)
231	6	"Gun Quest"	Harry Harris	Robert Van Scoyk	October 21, 1970
The Virginian arrested by a posse while on a trip is accused of murder. He is taken in for a trial by a less than proper judge who is also the hangman. When no one listens to him, he escapes to find the real killer and prove his innocence. Guest Stars: Joseph Cotten (Judge Hobbs), Brandon deWilde (Rem Garvey), Anne Francis (Myra Greencastle), John Smith (Dee Garvey), Agnes Moorehead (Emma Garvey), Neville Brand (Sheriff Wintle), Rod Cameron (Dunn), Monte Markham (Boss Cooper), Sallie Shockley (Nellie Cooper)
232	7	"Crooked Corner"	Herbert Hirschman	Harry Kronman	October 28, 1970
A group of German immigrants is repeatedly threatened by night riders who want them out due to prejudice. Tate becomes involved after the daughter of the leader of the immigrants mistakes him for the gunman they hired to protect them. Guest Stars: Susan Strasberg (Clara Hansch), Kurt Kasznar (August Hansch), Walter Koenig (Paul Erlich), Brock Peters (Ivers)
233	8	"Lady at the Bar"	Russ Mayberry	Leslie Stevens	November 4, 1970
Trampas is arrested for the murder of a man he argued with over a mine. The law seems primarily interested in wrapping up the trial as quickly as possible so they can go fishing. Trampas's hope lies with his attorney, Frances B. Finch. Guest Stars: Greer Garson (Frances B. Finch), E. G. Marshall (Judge Elmo J. Carver), James Whitmore (Marshal Krug)
234	9	"The Price of the Hanging"	Marc Daniels	Frank Chase	November 11, 1970
MacKenzie is injured saving Tate on a cattle drive. Tate takes him to Concho for help only to find the doctor there is in jail and to hang the next day. Tate is able to secure his release but finds that it comes with some high costs. Guest Stars: Lew Ayres (Judge Markham), Jane Wyatt (Mrs. Lori Kinkaid), Edward Binns (Dr. Benjamin Kinkaid), Patricia Harty (Tracy), Tom Tryon (Sheriff Sam Tolliver)
235	10	"Experiment at New Life"	Jeannot Szwarc	Lois Hire	November 18, 1970
The Virginian hunting for lost Shiloh cattle finds the trail leads to the New Life commune. Not only is one of the leaders holding his cattle, it becomes clear he is holding two women hostage as well complicating the work of The Virginian. Guest Stars: Vera Miles (Amelia Ballard), Sue Lyon (Belinda Ballard), Ralph Meeker (August Gruber)
236	11	"Follow the Leader"	Richard Benedict	Leslie Stevens	December 2, 1970
At the same time the Colonel's niece is visiting from England, Trampas is one of the suspects in the killing of a fellow ranch hand based on his custom gun. Trampas believes four brothers killed their cousin but how can he prove it. Guest Stars: Tony Franciosa (Ritter Miley), Kate Woodville (Vanessa MacKenzie), Noah Beery Jr. (Morgan), Frank Gorshin (Dutch)
237	12	"Last of the Comancheros"	Michael Caffey	Don Tait	December 9, 1970
MacKenzie is in New Mexico to buy cattle when he meets a female New York writer who takes an interest in the local Comancheros who are hated locally and especially by the Sheriff. Her story results in her kidnapping and trouble for all. Guest Stars: Ricardo Montalbán (Francisco Sosentes), James Gregory (Sheriff Joseph Parks), Beth Brickell (Sally Nye)
238	13	"Hannah"	Jack Arnold	True Boardman	December 30, 1970
Trampas comes to the aid of a girl and her father who had a heart attack. At the father's request he helps them at their destination and then to try to find the girl's mother who is with outlaws. He finds the girl has her own mind on it. Guest Stars: J. D. Cannon (Roy Harkness), Susan Oliver (Carole Carson), Peter Breck (Lafe), Warren Stevens (Paul Carson), Lisa True Gerritsen (Hannah Carson)
239	14	"Nan Allen"	Jeffrey Hayden	Dick Nelson	January 6, 1971
Col. MacKenzie is shocked to learn his friend was killed assaulting a business woman by her brother in their house. As the Colonel gets to know her, the relationship turns to love but he soon learns the brother may tear them apart as well. Guest Stars: Diane Baker (Nan Allen), Tom Skerritt (Bobby Allen), E. G. Marshall (Judge Arnold Carver)
240	15	"The Politician"	Michael Caffey	Written by : Robert Van Scoyk; Story by : Michael Fisher	January 13, 1971
The Virginian is sent to check out the Bonham ranch which is up for sale. Once there he finds himself caught in the fight between the brothers Foster and Jack who own the ranch and involved in the murder of a woman he once knew. Guest Stars: John Ericson (Jack Bonham), William Windom (Foster Bonham), Diana Muldaur (Rachel Bonham), Jean Hale (Eileen Terry), Denny Miller (Joe Terry), Jim Davis (Roper)
241	16	"The Animal"	Don McDougall	James Menzies	January 20, 1971
On the way home Tate finds himself in the middle of hunting party where the prey is a young Shawnee boy. Tate discovering the boy is deaf-mute takes him to jail after learning he is wanted for murder but finds he becomes the boy's lawyer. Guest Stars: Chuck Connors (Gustaveson), Katherine Crawford (Karen Gustaveson), Scott Brady (Dolby), Jack Ging (Owen), Rudy Ramos (the Indian), Edd Byrnes (Alex Newell), Andy Devine (Dr. Houseman), Leon Ames (Judge Fitzroy)
242	17	"The Legacy of Spencer Flats"	Russ Mayberry	B.W. Sandefur	January 27, 1971
In nearly abandoned Spencer Flats, Trampas is held by Della and Annie Spencer, who accuse him of being outlaw Deke Slaughter, though their handyman is not so convinced. Then the real Slaughter rides into the town, claiming to be a sheriff. Guest Stars: Ann Sothern (Della Spener), Edgar Buchanan (Teddy Birdwell), Bradford Dillman (Deke Slaughter / Sheriff O'Dell), Carolyn Jones (Annie Spencer)
243	18	"The Angus Killer"	Jeffrey Hayden	Story by : Edward DeBlasio; Teleplay by : Edward DeBlasio & Robert Van Scoyk	February 10, 1971
The Virginian is sent to look at buying an Angus herd from a widow. He arrives to find that someone is causing problems for her on the ranch ever since her husband died months earlier. Her son believes it is a neighbor but she disagrees. Guest Stars: Dina Merill (Laura Duff), Van Johnson (Alonzo), Ruth Roman (Margie), Andrew Parks (Jimmy), Chill Wills (Reedy), Stephen McNally (Muller), Slim Pickens (Sheriff)
244	19	"Flight from Memory"	Hollingsworth Morse	Jean Holloway	February 17, 1971
MacKenzie meets a girl in a daze who is thrown off her horse. He takes her to the cabin of the hermit Muley. Initially, the girl doesn't react to them but she slowly recovers some memory. A stranger arrives saying she is wanted for murder. Guest Stars: Burgess Meredith (Muley), Robert Fuller (Carl Ellis), Tisha Sterling (Melissa)
245	20	"Tate, Ramrod"	Marc Daniels	Arthur Browne Jr.	February 24, 1971
Tate helps ramrod a small ranch when the owner leaves to buy new breeding stock. However, the owner's plan to fence his pasture is met with strong resistance by a neighbor stopping Tate plus a surprise arrivals adds to the problems. Guest Stars: Michael Burns (Will Benson), Craig Stevens (Joe Benson), Alan Hale Jr. (Sam Donner), Jo Ann Harris (Amanda Benson), Sally Ann Howes (Martha Clayton), Peter Mark Richman (Wade), Rex Allen (Square Dancer Caller)
246	21	"The Regimental Line"	Hollingsworth Morse	Gene L. Coon	March 3, 1971
During the Ghost Dance movement a troop of soldiers visits Col MacKenzie to warn him and the ranchers. Parker as does MacKenzie recognizes Sgt. Mulcahy as a long thought dead Lt. Baxter from MacKenzie's Lancer regiment in India. Guest Stars: John Saxon (Sergeant Mulcahy)
247	22	"The Town Killer"	Harry Harris	Elroy Schwartz	March 10, 1971
The Virginian on a business trip to Montana finds himself in an area where protection is provided by an ex-outlaw to several towns. All is well until he is forced to kill one of the enforcers. That puts his life on the line with no backup. Guest Stars: Peter Lawford (Ben Hunter), Howard Duff (Stuart Masters), Brenda Benet (Susan Masters), Lloyd Bochner (Abel Wilks)
248	23	"Wolf Track"	Abner Biberman	Philip MacDonald	March 17, 1971
After being mauled by a cunning wolf he has been tracking, and then robbed of his possessions by a stranger, MacKenzie is taken in by a homesteader and her son. The wolf, however, is still at large and MacKenzie is determined to kill him. Guest Stars: Julie Harris (Jenny), Pernell Roberts (the Strangers), Clint Howard (Will), Arthur O'Connell (Emmitt)
249	24	"Jump-Up"	Herbert Hirschman	Ron Bishop	March 24, 1971
After stopping in the town of Jump-Up to see an old girlfriend, Tate is cheated in a card game by a gambler, and then framed by town boss John Timothy Driscoll and his son for killing the man, and forced into a hard labor camp. Guest Stars: John Astin (Slick Driscoll), Rick Jason (Tom Fuller), Madlyn Rhue (Frankie Grace), John McGiver (John Timothy Driscoll), Jan Sterling (Mary Beth Stanton)
