= Harold Michelson =

American artist

- Born: February 15, 1920; New York City, New York, U.S.
- Died: March 1, 2007 (aged 87); Woodland Hills, California, U.S.
- Occupation(s): Production designer, art director, illustrator
- Spouse: Lillian Farber (m. 1947)
- Children: 3

Harold Michelson (February 15, 1920 – March 1, 2007) was an American production designer and art director. In addition, he worked as an illustrator and/or storyboard artist on numerous films from the 1940s through the 1990s.

== Biography ==
A native of New York City, Michelson worked with the Bureau of Engraving and Printing in Washington, D.C. after graduating from high school. He then served as a bombardier-navigator in the U.S. Army Air Forces during World War II, flying more than 40 missions over Germany.

After the war, Michelson became an illustrator. He worked on magazines while attending the Art Students League of New York before moving on to Chicago and Los Angeles, where he illustrated movie posters. He ultimately became an illustrator for Columbia Pictures before being traded to Paramount Pictures, where he worked as illustrator and storyboard artist on The Ten Commandments. He then worked as a storyboard artist on Ben-Hur for MGM and Spartacus for Universal Pictures.

Throughout the remainder of the 1960s, he worked as either illustrator or storyboard artist on films such as West Side Story, The Birds, Cleopatra, Who's Afraid of Virginia Woolf? and The Graduate. During the 1970s, he was an illustrator for films like Fiddler on the Roof and Cross of Iron; in the 1980s, he worked on Firestarter and The Cotton Club, and he was a visual consultant on the 1986 remake of The Fly.

His career as an art director started in television, beginning with Matinee Theatre and moving to programs such as Gomer Pyle, USMC and The Andy Griffith Show. He served as art director on several films and began working as production designer with the 1971 Cannes Film Festival Jury Grand Prize-winning film Johnny Got His Gun, and he continued to work as an illustrator and storyboard artist.

Michelson worked on two films for Mel Brooks, first as production designer on History of the World, Part I and later as art director for Spaceballs. Michelson's other art direction credits include the films Mommie Dearest, Planes, Trains & Automobiles and Dick Tracy. He also served as a consultant for producer Danny DeVito on films such as Hoffa and Death to Smoochy.

== Death and legacy ==
Michelson died at the Motion Picture & Television Fund retirement home, following a long illness, at the age of 87.

The documentary film Harold and Lillian: A Hollywood Love Story describes the life and career of Michelson and his wife Lillian, who became a respected film researcher.

== Awards and honors ==
Michelson shared his first Academy Award nomination for his production designs on Star Trek: The Motion Picture, contributing to the interior and exterior design on the newly refit USS Enterprise. He shared a second nomination for his art direction on the 1983 film Terms of Endearment.

In 1999 Michelson was honored with the Art Directors Guild's Lifetime Achievement Award, and in 2002, he received the Outstanding Achievement in Production Design award from the Hollywood Film Festival.

He was inducted into the Art Directors Guild Hall of Fame in 2009.
