= Lillian Michelson =

American film scholar and researcher

Lillian Michelson (née Farber; born June 21, 1928) is an American film scholar and research librarian.

== History ==
=== Childhood ===
Born to Louis and Dora (née Keller) Farber and raised in an abusive family, she moved through multiple orphanages in Miami, Florida during her childhood. She noted in interviews that it was due to this that she was not able to have a Jewish upbringing and educational background. While originally planning on attending college, she dropped out in her first year to focus on her family.

=== Career ===
By 1961, when her children had reached schooling age, Michelson started a career in the field of film research while spending time as a volunteer in the film library at the studio with which she was affiliated that was run by Samuel Goldwyn. This position led to her overseeing what eventually was renamed the Michelson Cinema Research Library, which was an important resource for people involved in filmmaking.

Through this library, she performed research for numerous award-winning films, with her favorite being Fiddler On The Roof because it allowed her to focus on researching Jewish history and her ethnic background.

Some of her research endeavors required difficult and sometimes dangerous interactions to find the material she sought, with two of the more famous anecdotes involving asking elderly Jewish women what women's underwear looked like in the 1890s for Fiddler and interviewing drug lords and DEA agents as well as obtaining private photos from CIA databases in order to have accurate material for the film Scarface.

Officially acquiring the reference library in 1969 from the head librarian Lelia Alexander due to her retirement, Michelson had to borrow $20,000 against her husband Harold's life insurance policy in order to pay for the purchase. However, with the studio's having sold the library, Michelson was given only 30 days to move the reference materials outside of the studio location, and she had difficulty in finding any other studios willing to accept her transfer. Just before the deadline occurred, Michelson made a contract with the American Film Institute for the reference library to be housed in its new Greystone Mansion. The only room in the building that was available for her and her research materials was the old laundry room, where the library remained for 10 years. Evicted in 1979, she made a deal with the Hollywood Group to be housed in the Pantages Theatre. In May 1980, Michelson was called by Francis Coppola and asked to join the newly formed Zoetrope Studios, and she moved into this studio in June 1980.

Due to financial troubles at the studio, however, especially after the overinvestment for and bomb of One from the Heart, Michelson was let go in June 1986. DreamWorks Pictures became the library's resting place until the 2010s when Michelson retired, the library was in disuse for nearly a decade, and efforts were made to have it be transferred to a new location that could use the material. A Michelson Library Fund was established by The Film Collaborative non-profit to raise funds to sustain the library resources. In December 2020, it was announced that the library would be donated to the Internet Archive.

== Personal life ==
Lillian Farber married to production designer Harold Michelson after World War II. They were forced to elope due to disapproval from his family. They remained together until his death in 2007 and had three children. A documentary about their marriage and 60 years of partnership was released on April 28, 2015, titled Harold and Lillian: A Hollywood Love Story. Michelson currently lives in the retirement community set up by the Motion Picture & Television Fund in Los Angeles.

Harold and Lillian's contributions to the film industry were honored in various ways, including as major named references in films, with the characters of King Harold and Queen Lillian in Shrek 2 as homages to them. In 2017, they were given a Lifetime Achievement Award by the American Academy of Dramatic Arts for their contributions, making them the first behind-the-scenes non-actors to receive the award.
