= Joel Rogosin =

American television producer (1932–2020)

Joel Rogosin (October 30, 1932 – April 21, 2020) was an American television producer, director, and screenwriter in the 1960s to the 1990s. He was nominated for two Primetime Emmy Awards for his production work on Ironside in 1970 and 1971, and received his third Emmy nomination for producing Magnum, P.I. in 1983.

== Biography ==
Joel Rogosin was born on October 30, 1932, in Boston, Massachusetts. He was raised in Boston and Virginia, where he attended high school in Arlington and Falls Church. Rogosin graduated from Stanford University in 1955.

Rogosin began his professional career at Columbia Pictures, where he worked as a messenger beginning in 1957. After writing several television shows, he rose through the ranks quickly and, by 1961, Rogosin was a producer for the ABC television series, 77 Sunset Strip, which was the Number 1 most watched show in the United States at the time. Along with 77 Sunset Strip, Rogosin also produced Hawaiian Eye and Surfside 6 for Warner Bros. Television during the early 1960s.

Rogosin served as a producer, director, and/or screenwriter for Kraft Suspense Theatre, Sergeant Ryker (film starring Lee Marvin), The Sunshine Patriot (TV film starring Cliff Robertson), The Virginian, The Bold Ones: The New Doctors on NBC, Circle of Fear, Ghost Story on NBC, the CBS crime series Longstreet, The Blue Knight on CBS, Julie Farr, M.D. on ABC, Call to Glory, The Gift (TV film starring Glenn Ford and Kevin Bacon), the CBS sitcom Mr. Merlin, Magnum, P.I., Knight Rider, Big Rose:Double Trouble (TV film starring Shelly Winters), The Desperate Miles (TV film starring Tony Musante), The New Lassie, and two Jerry Lewis Telethons to benefit muscular dystrophy research.

In his later life, Rogosin and his wife, Deborah, moved to the Motion Picture & Television Fund, a retirement community for members of the motion pictures and television industry in the Woodland Hills neighborhood of Los Angeles. Rogosin was a leading member of the Grey Quill Society, which holds weekly workshops for residents of the Motion Picture & Television Fund to share poetry, creative fiction, drama, and other writings. Rogosin also worked to change the MPTF's long-term nursing facility to its present name, The Mary Pickford House, after actress Mary Pickford, who helped found the MPTF in 1920.

Joel Rogosin died from complications of COVID-19 at the Motion Picture & Television Fund on April 21, 2020, at the age of 87. He is survived by his wife of 67 years, Deborah, their three daughters, five grandchildren, and two great-grandchildren.

Rogosin was the fifth resident of Motion Picture & Television Country House and Hospital to die from COVID-19 during the COVID-19 pandemic in California. Other victims of COVID-19 at the MPTF Country House and Hospital include actor Allen Garfield, former Walt Disney animator Ann Sullivan, and cinematographer Allen Daviau.
