= Michelson Cinema Research Library =

Online film research library

The Michelson Cinema Research Library is a film research library containing 5,000 books, 30,000 photographs, and more than 1,000,000 clippings, scrapbooks, and ephemera.

It was overseen by Lillian Michelson who used the library to assist in the production of films.

In December 2020, it was announced that the library would be donated to the Internet Archive. The new home of the library was unveiled on January 27, 2021, with approximately 1,300 books made available to the public online.
