= Ann Sullivan (animator) =

American animator (1929–2020)

- Born: Sara Ann McNeese; April 10, 1929; Fargo, North Dakota, U.S.
- Died: April 13, 2020 (aged 91); Woodland Hills, Los Angeles, California, U.S.
- Occupation: Animator
- Years active: 1950s–2004
- Employer: Walt Disney Animation Studios

Ann Sullivan (April 10, 1929 – April 13, 2020) was an American animator, who primarily worked for Disney Animation.

== Early life and education ==
Born Sara Ann McNeese in Fargo, North Dakota to Helen (née Kossick) and Thomas McNeese. Thomas was an accountant, and Helen was a stenographer. She went to a Catholic school and then to North Dakota State University.

She followed her sister to California and enrolled at the ArtCenter College of Design in Pasadena.

== Career ==
Upon graduating in the 1950s, she began working in the animation paint lab of Disney Studios on films, including Peter Pan. Later, she took a leave of absence to raise her four children. In 1973, she joined Hanna-Barbera.

Sullivan returned to Disney around 1987, animating such films as Oliver & Company (1988), The Little Mermaid (1989) and The Prince and the Pauper (1990). In the 1990s, she painted cels for The Lion King (1994), Pocahontas (1995), Hercules (1997), Tarzan and Fantasia 2000 (both 1999). In the 2000s, she worked on The Emperor's New Groove (2000), Lilo & Stitch and Treasure Planet (both 2002).

== Personal life ==
In the early 1950s she married Kevin Sullivan. The couple had four children, and divorced in the 1970s. Sullivan was an avid painter. She taught art to children in the neighborhood of La Mirada, California where the family lived.

== Retirement and death ==
Sullivan spent her remaining years residing at the Motion Picture & Television Country House and Hospital, where she died of complications from COVID-19 on April 13, 2020, three days after her 91st birthday. She left behind four children, eight grandchildren and four great-grandchildren.
