= Motion Picture & Television Fund =

Charitable organization in Woodland Hills, California, United States

- Logo since 2021

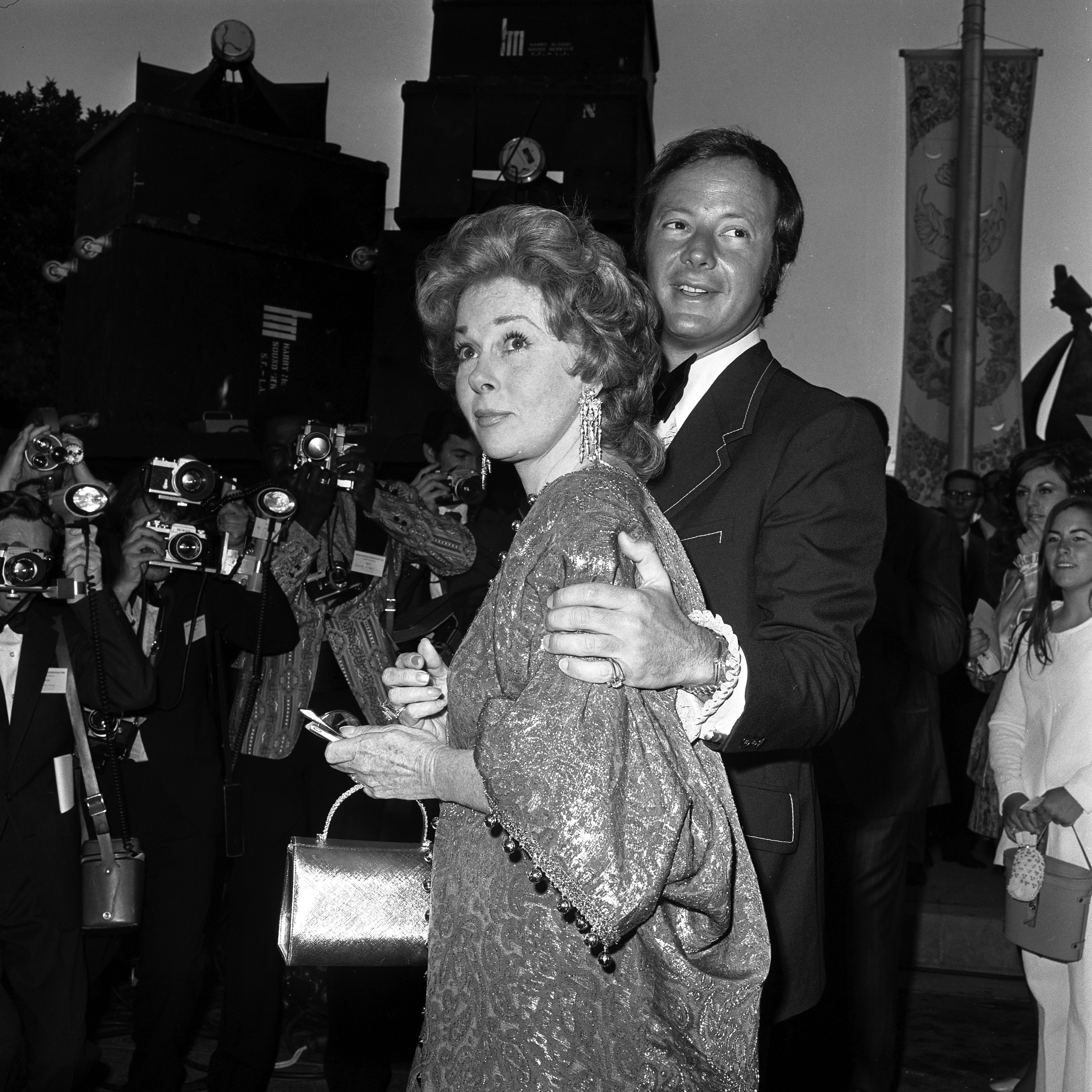
- Susan Hayward and Jay Bernstein arriving at a MPTF event in 1971
- Founded: 1921
- Type: Health care charity
- Location: 23388 Mulholland Drive, Woodland Hills, Los Angeles
- Coordinates: 34°09′20″N 118°38′05″W
- Website: mptf.com
- Formerly called: Motion Picture Relief Fund

The Motion Picture & Television Fund (MPTF) is a charitable organization that offers assistance and care to those in the motion picture and television industries and their families with limited or no resources, including services such as temporary financial assistance, case management, and residential living.

== Origin ==
Mary Pickford conceived the idea of a fund to help those in the motion picture industry who were out of work and struggling and, in 1921, the Motion Picture Relief Fund was founded with Joseph Schenck as president, Pickford as vice-president and the Reverend Neal Dodd as administrator.

During the 1930s, the untimely deaths of several former Hollywood stars who ended up destitute shook the community. These included Roscoe ("Fatty") Arbuckle, John Bowers, Karl Dane, Florence Lawrence, Marie Prevost and Lou Tellegen.

In 1940, Jean Hersholt, then president of the Motion Picture Relief Fund, found 48 acres (19 ha) of walnut and orange groves in the southwest end of the San Fernando Valley which were selling for US$850 an acre ($0.21/m^{2}) ($40,800). The fund's board purchased the parcel that same year to build the Motion Picture Country House. To offset the costs for the first buildings, which were designed by architect William Pereira, 7 acres (2.8 ha) were sold. Pickford and Hersholt broke the first ground. The dedication was on September 27, 1942.

The Motion Picture Hospital was dedicated on the grounds of the Country House in 1948. In attendance were Buddy Rogers and Loretta Young, among other stars. Services were later extended to those working in the television industry as well, and the name was altered to reflect the change. The retirement community, with individual cottages, administrative offices, and a hospital, is located at 23388 Mulholland Drive in the Woodland Hills neighborhood of Los Angeles, California.

In 1947, Movieland magazine published a detailed report on the Country House, noting that: “There are 55 resident guests here, twice as many men as women. To serve these guests there are 33 staff members. The oldest guest is 86 years. To be eligible to live here, one must be 55 years or older and have been actively associated with the industry for 20 years….At the moment a hospital wing is being added to the grounds…42 beds, all in private rooms, instead of 18, which is the present hospital capacity. Each guest has his own cottage, which comprises a large sitting room furnished in Swedish Moderne—the décor of the entire place—a bed in a draped alcove and a luxuriously appointed bathroom.” Movieland’s editor noted that “this beautiful home…is maintained by salaries of the stars who appear on ‘Screen Guild Players’ [CBS Radio]…and by voluntary donations of 1/2 of 1% of all motion picture actors’ salaries. The idea behind the fund is not charity, but rather a helping hand from one actor to another.”

== Operations ==
Scores of movie notables have spent their last years here, as have far less famous people from behind the scenes of the industry. Those with money paid their own way, while those who had no money paid nothing. Fees are based solely on the "ability to pay".

Individuals in movies, TV, and other aspects of the industry, such as actors, artists, backlot men, cameramen, directors, extras, producers, and security guards are accepted. To qualify for a cottage, applicants (or their spouses) must have reached a minimum age of 70 and must have worked steadily for at least 20 years in entertainment industry production. The waiting time is usually a few months, with no preference given to celebrities or those who can pay their own way, officials of the fund have said.

== History since 1990 ==
In 1993, the Motion Picture & Television Fund Foundation was established with Jeffrey Katzenberg as Founding Chairman. The Foundation, as it was formerly known, existed as the conduit to fulfill the vision of its donors and their philanthropy to the growing human needs of the entertainment community it serves. The MPTF Foundation puts on annual events that help raise millions of dollars in funds to continue to assist those entertainment industry members in need. These events include the Michael Douglas and Friends Golf Tournament, The Night Before and The Evening Before, the Heartbeat of Hollywood golf tournament and its Heartbeat Lite companion event, and Reel Stories, Real Lives.

In 2004, filmmaker Barry Avrich directed and produced, Glitter Palace the first documentary on the Motion Picture Country Home that was narrated by Brian Linehan. The film featured many of the residents living at MPTF.

In 2006, the groundbreaking for the Saban Center for Health and Wellness featuring the Jodie Foster Aquatic Pavilion was held on The Wasserman Campus. The center was named after donors Haim Saban and his wife, Dr. Cheryl Saban. It opened its doors on July 18, 2007, and features aquatic and land-based therapies as well as MPTF's Center on Aging, a best-practice model which provides a variety of programs that are geared toward improving the lives of the entertainment industry seniors throughout southern California. A new and emerging need to address quality-of-life issues for older adults in their own homes was identified and led to the creation of such MPTF programs and initiatives as Palliative Care, Elder Connection, Rebuilding Together, and the MPTF Age Well Program. In 2014, MPTF opened the Samuel Goldwyn Jr. Center for Behavioral Health, specializing in adults over 55 with acute mental health needs.

There was a turbulent period starting in early 2009 when the MPTF announced that rising costs amid the recession would force it to shutter its long-term care unit, which had 136 patients at the time, as well as its acute-care hospital. That decision created a barrage of criticism, with some questioning the fund's commitment to its stated goal of "taking care of our own." The MPTF restructured, brought in Bob Beitcher in 2010, and launched an aggressive $350 million fundraising campaign in 2012 headed by Jeffrey Katzenberg and George Clooney. Beitcher said the fundraising push was to provide a safety net for the 75,000 baby boomers who would be retiring from the industry over the next 20 years. At that point, $238 million had already been raised with key contributions from Clooney, Steve Bing, Tom Cruise, Barry Diller, Fox Entertainment Group, David Geffen, Michael Lewis, Jerry Perenchio, Joe Roth, Jeffrey and Marilyn Katzenberg, Todd Phillips, Patrick Soon-shiong, Thomas Tull and John Wells, among others. As of 2014, $325 million has been raised for this campaign. For its health care centers, MPTF partnered with UCLA Health, which today operates five MPTF health care centers in Los Angeles. These health centers are still exclusive to entertainment industry members.

The brainchild of Jeffrey Katzenberg, the annual "Night Before the Oscars" launched in 2003 and remains one of the main MPTF fundraising events. The 14th annual "Night Before" party, held February 27, 2016, raised a total of $5.2 million to benefit the MPTF. More than $70 million has been raised since the event was launched.

Through June 1, 2014, the MPTF's operations include a 250-bed multilevel care hospital, seven primary care health centers, a 186-unit retirement community on The Wasserman Campus in Woodland Hills providing independent and assisted living, and a free-standing child care facility.

The Samuel Goldwyn Foundation is the single largest donor in the foundation's 93-year history, with the family's total contributions to the MPTF upwards of $55 million.

On October 1, 2016, MPTF commemorated its 95th anniversary with a live entertainment event on its campus hosted by Hugh Jackman. Among the highlights were live musical performances by resident Helen Reddy, Derek Hough, Jane Lynch, Johnny Mathis, and Norm Lewis, with speakers including Chris Pine, Loretta Devine, Bryan Cranston, and Matt Bomer. A 100th birthday cake was presented to actor Kirk Douglas, who was in attendance with wife Anne and son Michael Douglas.

In 2020 and 2021 during the COVID-19 pandemic, MPTF was the administrator or co-administrator for multiple relief funds including the DGA, IATSE, ViacomCBS, Cast & Crew, the cast and crew of Westworld, and The Comedy Store, as well as its own dedicated COVID-19 relief fund for industry members at large. During the pandemic, MPTF Studios (the on-campus video production facility) began broadcasting live programming from its recently remodeled campus theater several days per week with residents and supporters video conferencing in to participate in a variety of shows and activities.

MPTF's memory care facility, Harry's Haven (named after Kirk Douglas' father, Herschel "Harry" Danielovitch), was relocated from its original standalone building to the second floor of the hospital in 2019 after an extensive remodel and upgrade. Also in 2019, the long-term care unit in the hospital was dedicated as Mary Pickford House, which contains 40 beds. Adjoining it is Hersholt Place (named after Jean Hersholt) with an additional 10 beds.

On January 14, 2021, MPTF was announced as the recipient of the Jean Hersholt Humanitarian Award, to be presented by the Academy of Motion Picture Arts and Sciences at the 93rd Oscars ceremony on April 25. This marked the first time in Academy history that an organization was chosen for the award, which was also presented that year to Tyler Perry. The award also coincided with the 100th anniversary of MPTF's founding.

== 2020 COVID-19 outbreak ==
The hospital experienced an outbreak amidst the COVID-19 pandemic in April 2020, resulting in the deaths of at least seven residents. All of the infected residents were transferred to the former acute care unit, J-Wing, which was set up as the dedicated COVID-19 unit of the hospital. The first fatalities at the retirement community were John Breier, a long-term care resident who died on April 7, 2020, and actor Allen Garfield, who also died on April 7. By April 22, 2020, 14 residents (out of a population of 162 residents) and nine of the facility's 400 employees had tested positive for COVID-19. Including Breier, at least five residents had died from COVID-19 by April 22, 2020. In January 2021, MPTF began a campus-wide program to vaccinate all residents.

=== Deaths ===
- Leah Bernstein, secretary
- John Breier
- Allen Daviau, cinematographer
- Allen Garfield, actor
- Joel Rogosin, television producer and screenwriter
- Ann Sullivan, animator

== Boards ==
The Fund has a board of directors and a Board of governors.

=== Board of directors ===
The members include:

- Bob Beitcher, President & CEO
- George Clooney
- Duncan Crabtree-Ireland
- Eric Esrailian
- Jim Gianopulos
- Howard Hammond
- Russell Hollander
- Michael Karlin
- Hawk Koch
- Jessie Kornberg
- David Kramer (talent agent)
- Matthew D. Loeb
- Kevin McCormick
- Lisa Pierozzi
- Peter Rice
- Blair Rich
- Maria Rodriguez
- Karen Rosenfelt
- Nina L. Shaw
- Emma Thomas
- Casey Wasserman
- John Wells

=== Board of governors ===
Members are:

- J. J. Abrams
- Byron Allen
- Dan Aloni
- Ike Barinholtz
- Betsy Beers
- Greg Berlanti
- Yvette Nicole Brown
- Christine Chiu
- Maha Dakhil
- Lauren Shuler Donner
- Channing Dungey
- Eric Esrailian, M.D.
- Colin Farrell
- Tony Goldwyn
- Carol Hamilton
- Curtis "50 Cent" Jackson
- Kevin McCormick
- McG
- Christopher Nolan
- Kelly Bush Novak
- Dana Nussbaum
- Ann Sarnoff
- Mickey Segal
- Cathleen Taff
- Erin Underhill
- Courtenay Valenti

=== NextGen board of directors ===
The members include:

- Cate Adams
- Simran Baidwan
- Camilla Belle
- Natalie Beitashour
- Gaby Cohen
- Bryan Diperstein
- Milton Dellossier
- Jeffrey R. Epstein
- Jason Winston George
- Michelle Homerin
- Flora Huang
- Alexa Levy
- Lyndsey Miller
- Anna Musky-Goldwyn
- Courtney Pinkerton
- Erez Rosenberg
- Allison Smartt

== Notable residents ==
- Bud Abbott (1897–1974), comedian
- Rodolfo Acosta (1920–1974)
- Mary Alden (1883–1946)
- Eddie Anderson (1905–1977)
- Gilbert M. Anderson (1880–1971)
- Jack Arnold (1916–1992)
- Johnny Arthur (1883–1951)
- Gertrude Astor (1887–1977)
- Mary Astor (1906–1987)
- Donna Atwood (1925–2010)
- Parley Baer (1914–2002)
- Carla Balenda (1925-2024)
- Bob Banner (1921–2011), producer
- Walt Barnes (1918–1998)
- Emory Bass (1925–2015)
- Jeanne Bates (1918–2007)
- Charles Belden (1904–1954)
- Monta Bell (1891–1958)
- Sally Benson (1897–1972)
- Willie Best (1916–1962)
- Clem Bevans (1879–1963)
- Helen Beverley (1916–2011)
- Whit Bissell (1909–1996)
- Billy Bitzer (1872–1944)
- Mari Blanchard (1927–1970)
- Betty Blythe (1893–1972)
- DeWitt Bodeen (1908–1988)
- Fortunio Bonanova (1895–1969)
- Aldrich Bowker (1875–1947)
- Eileen Brennan (1932–2013)
- Evelyn Brent (1901–1975)
- Johnny Mack Brown (1904–1974)
- Pat Crawford Brown (1929–2019)
- Phil Brown (1916–2006)
- Vanessa Brown (1928–1999)
- Carol Bruce (1919–2007), actress and singer
- Virginia Bruce (1910–1982)
- Fritzi Brunette (1890–1943)
- Richard Bull (1924–2014)
- Walter Burke (1908–1984)
- Bruce Cabot (1904–1972)
- Michael Callan (1935–2022)
- William Campbell (1923–2011)
- Rafael Campos (1936–1985)
- Mary Carlisle (1914–2018)
- Eddie Carroll (1933–2010), voice of Jiminy Cricket
- Walter Catlett (1889–1960)
- John Chambers (1922–2001)
- Mae Clarke (1910–1992)
- Anne V. Coates (1925–2018)
- Phyllis Coates (1927–2023)
- Richard Collier (1919–2000)
- Jerry Colonna (1904–1986)
- Pinto Colvig (1892–1967)
- Chester Conklin (1886–1971)
- Corinne Conley (born 1929)
- Joe Connelly (1917–2003)
- Ellen Corby (1911–1999)
- Wendell Corey (1914–1968)
- Robert Cornthwaite (1917–2006)
- Lloyd Corrigan (1900–1969)
- Maurice Costello (1877–1950)
- Nick Cravat (1912–1994)
- Donald Crisp (1882–1974)
- Robert Cummings (1910–1990)
- Stuart Damon (1937–2021)
- Viola Dana (1897–1987)
- Ruby Dandridge (1900–1987)
- Jane Darwell (1879–1967)
- Allen Daviau (1942–2020)
- Dorothy Davenport (1895–1977)
- Yvonne De Carlo (1922–2007)
- Fred de Cordova (1910–2001)
- Carter DeHaven (1886–1977)
- Joe DeRita (1909–1993)
- Dena Dietrich (1928–2020)
- Brian Donlevy (1901–1972)
- Fifi d'Orsay (1904–1983)
- Diana Douglas Webster (1923–2015)
- Billie Dove (1903–1997)
- Charles Dudley (1883–1952)
- Douglass Dumbrille (1889–1974)
- Minta Durfee (1889–1975)
- Herb Edelman (1933–1996)
- Cliff Edwards (1895–1971)
- Anthony Eisley (1925–2003)
- Stephen Elliott (1918–2005)
- Muriel Evans (1910–2000)
- Tom Ewell (1909–1994)
- John Fante (1909–1983)
- Franklyn Farnum (1878–1961)
- Dorothy Fay (1915–2003)
- Maude Fealy (1883–1971)
- Norman Fell (1924–1998)
- Edith Fellows (1923–2011)
- Stepin Fetchit (1902–1985)
- Larry Fine (1902–1975)
- Max Fleischer (1883–1972)
- Richard Fleischer (1916–2006)
- Bess Flowers (1898–1984)
- June Foray (1917–2017)
- Harrison Ford (1884–1957) (silent film actor)
- Helen Forrest (1917–1999) (singer)
- Douglas Fowley (1911–1998)
- Eddie Foy Jr. (1905–1983)
- Joe Frisco (1889–1958)
- Annette Funicello (1942–2013)
- Lillian Gallo (1928–2012)
- Allen Garfield (1939–2020)
- Peggy Ann Garner (1932–1984)
- Lila Garrett (1925–2020), writer
- Anita Garvin (1907–1994)
- Hoot Gibson (1892–1962)
- James Gleason (1882–1959)
- Harold Gould (1923–2010)
- Lita Grey (1908–1995)
- Virginia Grey (1917–2004)
- Edmund Gwenn (1877–1959)
- Anne Gwynne (1918–2003)
- Sara Haden (1899–1981)
- Jean Hagen (1923–1977)
- Creighton Hale (1882–1965)
- Jonathan Hale (1891–1966)
- Bridget Hanley (1941–2021)
- Julius Harris (1923–2004)
- Ken Harris (1898–1982)
- Del Henderson (1877–1956)
- Irene Hervey (1909–1998), mother of singer Jack Jones
- Curly Howard (1903–1952)
- Rose Hobart (1906–2000)
- Randy Van Horne (1924–2007)
- Harry O. Hoyt (1885–1961)
- Gareth Hughes (1894–1965)
- Arthur Hunnicutt (1910–1979)
- Wilfrid Hyde-White (1903–1991)
- Frieda Inescort (1901–1976)
- Richard Jaeckel (1926–1997)
- Glynis Johns (1923–2024)
- I. Stanford Jolley (1900–1978)
- Marcia Mae Jones (1924–2007)
- Allyn Joslyn (1901–1981)
- DeForest Kelley (1920–1999)
- Patsy Kelly (1910–1981)
- Fred A. Kelsey (1884–1961)
- Edgar Kennedy (1890–1948)
- Madge Kennedy (1891–1987)
- Michael Kennan (1939–2020)
- Kathleen Key (1903–1954)
- Andrea King (1919–2003)
- Mabel King (1932–1999)
- Wright King (1923–2018)
- James Kirkwood, Sr. (1875–1963)
- Fuzzy Knight (1901–1976)
- Patric Knowles (1911–1995)
- Gail Kobe (1932–2013)
- Stanley Kramer (1913–2001)
- Otto Kruger (1885–1974)
- Charles Lamont (1895–1993)
- Elsa Lanchester (1902–1986)
- Allan Lane (1909–1973)
- Laura La Plante (1904–1996)
- Mitchell Leisen (1898–1972)
- Nat Levine (1899–1989)
- Ruby R. Levitt (1907–1992), 4-time Academy Award-nominated set designer
- Geoffrey Lewis (1935–2015)
- Monica Lewis (1922–2015)
- Vera Lewis (1873–1956)
- Joanne Linville (1928–2021)
- Babe London (1901–1980)
- Edmund Lowe (1890–1971)
- Marion Leonard (1881–1956)
- John Litel (1892–1972)
- Ida Lupino (1918–1995)
- Ken Maynard (1895–1973)
- Katherine MacGregor (1925–2018)
- Diane MacGregor (1941–2022)
- Pat McCormick (1927–2005)
- Joel McCrea (1905–1990)
- Hattie McDaniel (1895–1952)
- Ralph Meeker (1920–1988)
- Bess Meredyth (1890–1969)
- Lillian Michelson (born 1928)
- Nolan Miller (1933–2012)
- Thomas R. Mills (1878–1953)
- Nico Minardos (1930–2011)
- Dolores Moran (1924–1982)
- Karen Morley (1909–2003)
- Mae Murray (1885–1965) (a founding trustee)
- George Nader (1921–2002)
- Marshall Neilan (1891–1958)
- Lois Nettleton (1927–2008)
- Tommy Noonan (1921–1968)
- Gertrude Norman (1848 or 1851–1943)
- Harry Northup (born 1940)
- Virginia O'Brien (1919–2001)
- Arthur O'Connell (1908–1981)
- Donald O'Connor (1925–2003)
- Gerald S. O'Loughlin (1921–2015)
- Harry Oliver (1888–1973)
- Susan Oliver (1932–1990)
- Maria Ouspenskaya (1876–1949)
- Jean Parker (1915–2005)
- Louella Parsons (1881–1972)
- Hank Patterson (1888–1975)
- Virginia Pearson (1886–1958)
- House Peters Jr. (1916–2008)
- Edna Purviance (1895–1958)
- Robert Quarry (1925–2009)
- Norman Reilly Raine (1894–1971)
- Jobyna Ralston (1899–1967)
- Herbert Rawlinson (1886–1953)
- Anne Ramsey (1929–1988)
- Irving Rapper (1898–1999)
- Bernard B. Ray (1895–1964)
- Helen Reddy (1941–2020)
- Madlyn Rhue (1935–2003)
- Warner Richmond (1886–1948)
- Hal Riddle (1919–2009)
- Robert Riskin (1897–1955)
- Blossom Rock (aka Marie Blake) (1895–1978)
- Joel Rogosin (1932–2020)
- Leonard Rosenman (1924–2008)
- Mark Rydell (1929–2026)
- Marin Sais (1890–1971)
- Theresa Saldana (1954–2016)
- Philip Saltzman (1928–2009)
- Ann Savage (1921–2008)
- Connie Sawyer (1912–2018)
- Richard Schaal (1928–2014)
- Vito Scotti (1918–1996)
- Dorothy Sebastian (1903–1957)
- Mack Sennett (1880–1960)
- Gustav von Seyffertitz (1862–1943)
- Truly Shattuck (1875–1954)
- Robert Shayne (1900–1992)
- Bette Shayne (1921–2010)
- Norma Shearer (1902–1983)
- Allan Sherman (1924–1973)
- Vincent Sherman (1906–2006)
- Geoffrey Shurlock (1884–1976), director of the Production Code Administration from 1954 to 1968
- Henry Silva (1926–2022)
- Jay Silverheels (1912–1980)
- Ronald Sinclair (1924–1992)
- Gerald Oliver Smith (1892–1974)
- Hal Smith (1916–1994)
- Kent Smith (1907–1985)
- William Smith (1933–2021)
- Marguerite Snow (1889–1958)
- Abraham Sofaer (1896–1988)
- Gale Sondergaard (1899–1985)
- Ralph Spence (1889–1949)
- Spivy (1906–1971)
- Richard Stahl (1932–2006)
- Jan Sterling (1921–2004)
- George E. Stone (1903–1967)
- Harold J. Stone (1913–2005)
- Madame Sul-Te-Wan (1873–1959)
- Ann Sullivan (1929–2020)
- Hope Summers (1896–1979)
- Grady Sutton (1906–1995)
- Richard Sylbert (1928–2002)
- Benny Thau (1898–1983), studio executive
- Ruthie Tompson (1910–2021)
- Regis Toomey (1898–1991)
- Audrey Totter (1917–2013)
- Forrest Tucker (1919–1986)
- Richard Tucker (1884–1942)
- Lawrence Turman (1926–2023)
- Florence Turner (1885–1946)
- Edgar G. Ulmer (1904–1972)
- Van Wakely (1919–1998)
- H. B. Warner (1875–1958)
- Johnny Weissmuller (1904–1984)
- Ben Welden (1901–1997)
- Lyle R. Wheeler (1905–1990)
- Dick Wilson (1916–2007)
- Henry Willson (1911–1978)
- Edward Winter (1937–2001)
- Estelle Winwood (1883–1984)
- Than Wyenn (1919–2015)
- Alan Young (1919–2016)
- Clara Kimball Young (1890–1960)

== See also ==
- Golden Boot Awards
