= List of deaths due to the COVID-19 pandemic =

This is a list of notable people reported as having died either from coronavirus disease 2019 (COVID-19), as a result of infection by the virus SARS-CoV-2 during the COVID-19 pandemic, from its initial identification in January 2020 through the World Health Organization's declaration of the end of the emergency in May 2023.

== Index ==
2020: January · February · March · April · May · June · July · August · September · October · November · December
2021: January · February · March · April · May · June · July · August · September · October · November · December
2022: January · February · March · April · May · June · July · August · September · October · November · December
2023: January · February · March · April

== Deaths ==
Date	Name	Age	Notes	Place of death
25 January 2020	Liang Wudong	60	Doctor (first death due to hospital-acquired infection)	China (Wuhan)
26 January 2020	Wang Xianliang	62	Politician	China (Wuhan)
27 January 2020	Yang Xiaobo	57	Politician	China (Wuhan)
31 January 2020	Wen Zengxian	67	Politician	China (Wuhan)
1 February 2020	Andy Gill	64	Musician and music producer	United Kingdom (London)
6 February 2020	Qiu Jun	72	Bodybuilder	China (Wuhan)
7 February 2020	Hong Ling	53	Geneticist	China (Wuhan)
7 February 2020	Li Wenliang	33	Doctor (whistleblower of the COVID-19 outbreak in Wuhan)	China (Wuhan)
10 February 2020	Lin Zhengbin	62	Doctor	China (Wuhan)
13 February 2020	Liu Shouxiang	61	Painter	China (Wuhan)
14 February 2020	Liu Fan	59	Nurse	China (Wuhan)
15 February 2020	Duan Zhengcheng	85	Engineer	China (Wuhan)
19 February 2020	Ke Huibing	41	Scientist	China (Wuhan)
27 February 2020	Hadi Khosroshahi	81	Diplomat	Iran (Tehran)
29 February 2020	Mohammad Ali Ramazani Dastak	56	Politician	Iran (Rasht)
2 March 2020	Mohammad Mirmohammadi	71	Politician	Iran (Tehran)
2 March 2020	Ahmad Toyserkani Ravari	59	Judge	Iran (Ravar)
5 March 2020	Hossein Sheikholeslam	67	Politician	Iran (Tehran)
7 March 2020	Reza Mohammadi Langroudi	91	Ayatollah	Iran (Langarud)
7 March 2020	Fatemeh Rahbar	55	Politician	Iran (Tehran)
9 March 2020	Italo De Zan	94	Cyclist	Italy (Treviso)
9 March 2020	Lee Cha-su	62	Politician	South Korea (Daegu)
9 March 2020	Mohammad-Reza Rahchamani	67	Politician	Iran (Tehran)
10 March 2020	Mohammad Kiavash	89	Politician	Iran (Tehran)
10 March 2020	Marcelo Peralta	59	Saxophonist	Spain (Madrid)
11 March 2020	Roberto Stella	67	Physician	Italy (Como)
12 March 2020	Giovanni Battista Rabino	88	Politician	Italy (Asti)
13 March 2020	Nasser Shabani	62	Military officer	Iran
14 March 2020	Piero Schlesinger	89	Banker	Italy (Milan)
15 March 2020	Vittorio Gregotti	92	Architect	Italy (Milan)
15 March 2020	Aytaç Yalman	79	Politician	Turkey (Istanbul)
15 March 2020	Sergio Bassi	70	Singer-songwriter	Italy (Crema)
16 March 2020	Nicolas Alfonsi	83	Politician	France (Ajaccio)
16 March 2020	Hashem Bathaie Golpayegani	78–79	Politician	Iran (Qom)
16 March 2020	Francesco Saverio Pavone	75	Magistrate	Italy (Venice)
16 March 2020	Fariborz Raisdana	75	Economist	Iran (Tehran)
17 March 2020	Stephen Schwartz	78	Doctor	United States (Seattle)
17 March 2020	Patrick Nothomb	83	Diplomat	Belgium (Habay)
18 March 2020	Rose Marie Compaoré	61	Politician	Burkina Faso (Ouagadougou)
18 March 2020	Luciano Federici	81	Footballer	Italy (Carrara)
18 March 2020	Henri Richelet	75	Painter	France (Paris)
18 March 2020	Sérgio Trindade	79	Chemical engineer and researcher	United States (New York City)
19 March 2020	Innocenzo Donina	69	Footballer	Italy (Bergamo)
19 March 2020	Hamid Kahram	62	Politician	Iran (Tehran)
19 March 2020	Aurlus Mabélé	66	Singer-songwriter	France (Eaubonne)
19 March 2020	Antonio Michele Stanca	77	Geneticist	Italy (Fidenza)
19 March 2020	Hans Knudsen	75	Canoer	Denmark (Roskilde)
20 March 2020	Carlos Falcó, 5th Marquess of Griñón	83	Grandee of Spain, businessman, and socialite	Spain (Madrid)
20 March 2020	Carole Finer	83	Radio presenter and artist	United Kingdom
20 March 2020	Jacques Oudin	80	Politician	France (Suresnes)
20 March 2020	Marino Quaresimin	82	Politician	Italy (Vicenza)
20 March 2020	Tarcisio Stramare	91	Priest	Italy (Imperia)
20 March 2020	Jasem Jaderi	63	Politician	Iran
21 March 2020	Marguerite Aucouturier	87	Psychoanalyst	France (Paris)
21 March 2020	Aileen Baviera	60	Political scientist and sinologist	Philippines (Manila)
21 March 2020	Vicenç Capdevila	83	Politician	Spain (L'Hospitalet de Llobregat)
21 March 2020	Jean-Jacques Razafindranazy	67	Doctor	France (Lille)
21 March 2020	Lorenzo Sanz	76	Businessman	Spain (Madrid)
21 March 2020	William Stern	84	Businessman and Holocaust survivor	United Kingdom
21 March 2020	Craig Shergold	40	Businessman and cancer survivor	United Kingdom
22 March 2020	Germà Colón	91	Philologist	Spain (Barcelona)
22 March 2020	Pino Grimaldi	71	Designer and academic	Italy (Maddaloni)
22 March 2020	Benito Joanet	84	Footballer and coach	Spain (Alicante)
22 March 2020	José María Loizaga Viguri	83	Businessman	Spain (Ciudad Real)
22 March 2020	Mike Longo	83	Pianist	United States (New York City)
23 March 2020	Maurice Berger	63	Curator	United States (Copake)
23 March 2020	Lucia Bosè	89	Actress	Spain (Segovia)
23 March 2020	Carole Brookins	76	Banker	United States (Palm Beach)
23 March 2020	Llorenç Cassi	79	Athlete and coach	Spain
23 March 2020	Borja Domecq Solís	74	Businessman	Spain (Mérida)
23 March 2020	Brian Crowe	82	Diplomat	United Kingdom
23 March 2020	José Folgado	75	Politician	Spain (Madrid)
23 March 2020	Paul Karslake	65	Artist	United Kingdom (Leigh-on-Sea)
23 March 2020	Anastasio López Ramírez	63	Politician	Spain (Alcázar de San Juan)
23 March 2020	Zororo Makamba	30	Journalist	Zimbabwe (Harare)
23 March 2020	Alan Ortiz	66	Civil servant	France (Paris)
23 March 2020	Usama Riaz	26	Doctor	Pakistan
23 March 2020	Calogero Rizzuto	65	Architect and historic preservationist	Italy (Syracuse)
23 March 2020	Walter Robb	91	Engineer	United States (Schenectady)
23 March 2020	Mary Roman	84	Athlete and community leader	United States (Norwalk)
23 March 2020	Lucien Sève	93	Philosopher	France (Clamart)
23 March 2020	Júlia Sigmond	90	Puppet actor and Esperantist	Italy (Piacenza)
23 March 2020	Nashom Wooden	50	Drag queen	United States (New York City)
24 March 2020	Lorenzo Acquarone	89	Politician	Italy (Genoa)
24 March 2020	Pierluigi Consonni	71	Footballer	Italy (Ponte San Pietro)
24 March 2020	Romi Cohn	91	Rabbi and real estate developer	United States (Brooklyn)
24 March 2020	Manu Dibango	86	Saxophonist	France (Melun)
24 March 2020	Mohamed Farah	59	Footballer	United Kingdom (London)
24 March 2020	Alan Finder	72	Journalist	United States (Ridgewood)
24 March 2020	David Edwards	48	Basketball player	United States (Queens)
24 March 2020	Paul Goma	84	Political dissident and writer	France (Paris)
24 March 2020	Giuseppe Covre	69	Politician	Italy
24 March 2020	Terrence McNally	81	Playwright and screenwriter	United States (Sarasota)
24 March 2020	Lillo Venezia	70	Journalist	Italy (Catania)
24 March 2020	Sterling Maddox	78	Politician	United States (Arlington County)
24 March 2020	John F. Murray	92	Pulmonologist	France (Paris)
24 March 2020	Jenny Polanco	62	Fashion designer	Dominican Republic (Santo Domingo)
24 March 2020	E. Harikumar	76	Writer	India
25 March 2020	Harry Aarts	90	Politician	Netherlands (Tilburg)
25 March 2020	María Araujo	69	Costume designer	Spain (Barcelona)
25 March 2020	Edman Ayvazyan	87	Painter	United Kingdom (London)
25 March 2020	Danilo Barozzi	92	Cyclist	Italy (Santa Maria Nuova)
25 March 2020	Mark Blum	69	Actor	United States (New York City)
25 March 2020	Floyd Cardoz	59	Chef and television personality	United States (Montclair)
25 March 2020	Martinho Lutero Galati	66	Conductor	Brazil (São Paulo)
25 March 2020	Detto Mariano	82	Composer and pianist	Italy (Milan)
25 March 2020	Angelo Moreschi	67	Bishop	Italy (Brescia)
25 March 2020	Freddy Rodriguez	89	Saxophonist and composer	United States (Denver)
26 March 2020	Menggie Cobarrubias	66	Actor	Philippines (Manila)
26 March 2020	Ito Curata	60	Fashion designer	Philippines (Muntinlupa)
26 March 2020	Olle Holmquist	83	Trombonist	Sweden
26 March 2020	Princess María Teresa of Bourbon-Parma	86	Princess, activist, and political sociologist	France (Paris)
26 March 2020	Naomi Munakata	64	Conductor	Brazil (São Paulo)
26 March 2020	Luigi Roni	78	Singer	Italy (Lucca)
26 March 2020	Michael Sorkin	71	Architect and critic	United States (New York City)
26 March 2020	Nino Cassanello	75	Doctor	Ecuador (Guayaquil)
26 March 2020	Hamish Wilson	77	Actor	United Kingdom (Rutherglen)
26 March 2020	Daniel Yuste	75	Cyclist	Spain (Madrid)
27 March 2020	Daniel Azulay	72	Comic book artist	Brazil (Rio de Janeiro)
27 March 2020	Imam Suroso	56	Politician	Indonesia (Semarang)
27 March 2020	Santiago Llorente Fernández	55	Athlete	Spain (Segovia)
27 March 2020	Jesús Gayoso Rey	48	Police officer	Spain (Logroño)
27 March 2020	Delroy Washington	67	Singer	United Kingdom (London)
27 March 2020	Ruben Melogno	74	Singer	Spain (Madrid)
27 March 2020	José Luis González Novalín	91	Priest	Spain (Oviedo)
27 March 2020	Dositeo Rodríguez	84	Politician	Spain (Santiago de Compostela)
27 March 2020	Jacques F. Acar	88	Doctor	France (Paris)
27 March 2020	Stefan Lippe	64	Businessman	Switzerland
27 March 2020	Orlando McDaniel	59	American football player	United States (DeSoto)
27 March 2020	Michael McKinnell	84	Architect	United States (Beverly)
27 March 2020	Mario Benedetti	64	Poet	Italy (Piadena)
27 March 2020	Hamed Karoui	92	Politician	Tunisia (Sousse)
28 March 2020	Fevzi Aksoy	89	Academic, neurologist, and sportswriter	Turkey (Istanbul)
28 March 2020	Kerstin Behrendtz	69	Radio broadcaster	Sweden (Stockholm)
28 March 2020	Patrick Devedjian	75	Politician	France (Antony)
28 March 2020	Thandika Mkandawire	79	Economist	Sweden (Stockholm)
28 March 2020	April Dunn	33	Disability rights activist	United States (Baton Rouge)
28 March 2020	Chato Galante	71	Activist and former political prisoner	Spain (Madrid)
28 March 2020	Rodolfo González Rissotto	70	Politician	Uruguay (Montevideo)
28 March 2020	William B. Helmreich	74	Sociologist	United States (Great Neck)
28 March 2020	Denise Millet	86	Illustrator	France (Paris)
28 March 2020	Pearson Jordan	69	Athlete	United States (Dallas)
28 March 2020	Raffaele Masto	66	Journalist and writer	Italy (Bergamo)
28 March 2020	Azam Khan	83	Squash player	United Kingdom (London)
28 March 2020	Michel Tibon-Cornillot	84	Philosopher and anthropologist	France (Paris)
28 March 2020	Salvador Vives	77	Voice actor	Spain (Barcelona)
28 March 2020	William Wolf	94	Film and theater critic	United States (New York City)
29 March 2020	Beryl Bernay	94	Journalist and children's television creator	United States (New York City)
29 March 2020	José Luis Capón	72	Footballer	Spain (Madrid)
29 March 2020	Emilia Currás	92	Information scientist and academic	Spain (Madrid)
29 March 2020	Joe Diffie	61	Country singer	United States (Nashville)
29 March 2020	Robert H. Garff	77	Politician	United States (Salt Lake City)
29 March 2020	David Hodgkiss	71	Cricket administrator	United Kingdom
29 March 2020	Isaac Robinson	44	Politician	United States (Detroit)
29 March 2020	Maria Mercader	54	Television news producer and journalist	United States (New York City)
29 March 2020	Alan Merrill	69	Musician and singer	United States (New York City)
29 March 2020	Tomas Oneborg	62	Photographer	Sweden (Stockholm)
29 March 2020	Francis Rapp	93	Historian	France (Angers)
29 March 2020	Angelo Rottoli	61	Boxer	Italy (Ponte San Pietro)
29 March 2020	Ken Shimura	70	Comedian	Japan (Tokyo)
29 March 2020	Henri Tincq	74	Journalist	France (Villeneuve-Saint-Georges)
30 March 2020	Maurice Bidermann	87	Businessman	France (Paris)
30 March 2020	Lorena Borjas	59	Transgender and immigrant rights activist	United States (Brooklyn)
30 March 2020	Wilhelm Burmann	80	Ballet master and teacher	United States (New York City)
30 March 2020	Jorge Chica	68	Footballer	Ecuador
30 March 2020	Hilary Dwyer	74	Actress	United Kingdom
30 March 2020	James T. Goodrich	73	Doctor	United States (New York City)
30 March 2020	Milutin Knežević	71	Bishop	Serbia (Belgrade)
30 March 2020	Ivo Mahlknecht	80	Skier	Italy (Urtijëi)
30 March 2020	José Antonio Martínez Bayó	67	Athlete	Spain (Barcelona)
30 March 2020	Antonio Álvarez Solís	91	Journalist	Spain
30 March 2020	Ted Monette	74	Military officer	United States (Holyoke)
30 March 2020	Ángel Sánchez Mendoza	56	Journalist	Ecuador (Guayaquil)
30 March 2020	Manuel Adolfo Varas	76	Broadcaster and sports journalist	Ecuador (Guayaquil)
30 March 2020	Joachim Yhombi-Opango	81	Politician	France (Neuilly-sur-Seine)
31 March 2020	Julie Bennett	88	Voice actor	United States (Los Angeles)
31 March 2020	Viktar Dashkevich	75	Actor	Belarus (Vitebsk)
31 March 2020	Pape Diouf	68	Businessman	Senegal (Dakar)
31 March 2020	Gian Carlo Ceruti	67	Sports manager and administrator	Italy (Crema)
31 March 2020	Rafael Gómez Nieto	99	Military officer	France (Strasbourg)
31 March 2020	James Gordon, Baron Gordon of Strathblane	83	Peer and politician	United Kingdom (Glasgow)
31 March 2020	Andrew Jack	76	Dialect coach and actor	United Kingdom (London)
31 March 2020	Turhan Kaya	68	Actor	Turkey (Istanbul)
31 March 2020	Hedgemon Lewis	75	Boxer	United States (Detroit)
31 March 2020	Cristina Monet-Palaci	64	Singer	United States (New York City)
31 March 2020	Gita Ramjee	63	HIV prevention researcher	South Africa (Umhlanga)
31 March 2020	Wallace Roney	59	Jazz trumpeter	United States (Paterson)
31 March 2020	Peter J. N. Sinclair	73	Economist	United Kingdom
31 March 2020	Michael Wakelam	75	Biologist	United Kingdom
31 March 2020	Kioumars Derambakhsh	74	Filmmaker	France (Paris)
1 April 2020	Branislav Blažić	63	Politician	Serbia (Belgrade)
1 April 2020	David Driskell	88	Visual artist and academic	United States (Washington)
1 April 2020	Kevin Duffy	87	Judge	United States (Greenwich)
1 April 2020	Bernard Epin	83	Writer and literary critic	France (Paris)
1 April 2020	Yisroel Friedman	83	Rabbi	United States (New York City)
1 April 2020	Nur Hassan Hussein	83	Politician	United Kingdom (London)
1 April 2020	Philippe Malaurie	85	Lawyer	France (Paris)
1 April 2020	Gérard Mannoni	92	Sculptor	France (Viry-Châtillon)
1 April 2020	Ellis Marsalis Jr.	85	Pianist	United States (New Orleans)
1 April 2020	Richard Passman	94	Aeronautical engineer and space scientist	United States (Silver Spring)
1 April 2020	Bucky Pizzarelli	94	Guitarist	United States (Saddle River)
1 April 2020	Adam Schlesinger	52	Singer-songwriter and musician	United States (Poughkeepsie)
1 April 2020	Kim H. Veltman	71	Historian	Netherlands (Maastricht)
1 April 2020	Dora Werzberg	99	Nurse and social worker	France (Paris)
1 April 2020	Carme Llorens Gilabert	93	Jeweller	Spain
1 April 2020	John Tydeman	84	Radio producer	United Kingdom
2 April 2020	Goyo Benito	73	Footballer	Spain (Madrid)
2 April 2020	Patricia Bosworth	86	Actress and author	United States (New York City)
2 April 2020	Bernardita Catalla	62	Diplomat	Lebanon (Beirut)
2 April 2020	Zaccaria Cometti	83	Footballer	Italy (Romano di Lombardia)
2 April 2020	A. Bruce Goldman	84	Rabbi	United States
2 April 2020	François de Gaulle	98	Priest and missionary	France (Bry-sur-Marne)
2 April 2020	William Frankland	108	Immunologist and allergist	United Kingdom (London)
2 April 2020	Juan Giménez	76	Comic book artist and illustrator	Argentina (Mendoza)
2 April 2020	Anick Jesdanun	51	Writer	United States (New York City)
2 April 2020	Eddie Large	78	Comedian	United Kingdom (Bristol)
2 April 2020	Gustavo Orellana	78 or 79	Singer	Ecuador (Guayaquil)
2 April 2020	Feriha Öz	87	Doctor	Turkey
2 April 2020	Rodrigo Pesántez Rodas	82	Writer and poet	Ecuador (Guayaquil)
2 April 2020	Sergio Rossi	84	Designer	Italy (Cesena)
2 April 2020	Aaron Rubashkin	92	Businessman	United States (New York City)
2 April 2020	Nirmal Singh Khalsa	67	Singer	India (Amritsar)
2 April 2020	Arnold Sowinski	89	Footballer	France (Lens)
2 April 2020	Aptripel Tumimomor	53	Politician	Indonesia (Makassar)
2 April 2020	Jan Veentjer	82	Field hockey player	Netherlands (The Hague)
2 April 2020	Arthur Whistler	75	Botanist	United States (Honolulu)
2 April 2020	Robert Beck	83	Pentathlete and fencer	United States (San Antonio)
2 April 2020	Manolo Navarro	93	Bullfighter	Spain (Madrid)
3 April 2020	Arnold Demain	92	Microbiologist	United States (Madison)
3 April 2020	Henri Ecochard	96	Military officer	France (Levallois-Perret)
3 April 2020	Bob Glanzer	74	Politician	United States (Sioux Falls)
3 April 2020	Francisco Hernando Contreras	74	Housing developer	Spain (Madrid)
3 April 2020	Marguerite Lescop	104	Writer	Canada (Montreal)
3 April 2020	Hans Prade	81	Diplomat	Netherlands (Rotterdam)
3 April 2020	Omar Quintana	76	Politician	Ecuador (Guayaquil)
3 April 2020	Marcelle Ranson-Hervé	90	Actress	France (Marseille)
3 April 2020	Tim Robinson	85	Writer and cartographer	United Kingdom (London)
3 April 2020	Joel Shatzky	76	Writer and literary professor	United States (Ithaca)
3 April 2020	Arlene Stringer-Cuevas	86	Politician	United States (The Bronx)
3 April 2020	Yusuf Kenan Sönmez	72	Politician	Turkey (Balıkesir)
3 April 2020	Frida Wattenberg	95	Lawyer and member of the French Resistance	France (Paris)
3 April 2020	Shamsur Rahman Sherif	79	Politician	Bangladesh (Dhaka)
4 April 2020	Montserrat Sabater Bacigalupi	79	Publisher	Spain (Barcelona)
4 April 2020	Jay Benedict	68	Actor	United Kingdom (London)
4 April 2020	Philippe Bodson	75	Politician	Belgium (Brussels)
4 April 2020	Forrest Compton	94	Actor	United States (Shelter Island)
4 April 2020	Florindo Corral	70	Businessman	Brazil (São Paulo)
4 April 2020	Giovanni Coppiano	54	Medical technologist and clown	Ecuador (Guayaquil)
4 April 2020	Tom Dempsey	73	American football player	United States (New Orleans)
4 April 2020	Xavier Dor	91	Embryologist and anti-abortion activist	France (Paris)
4 April 2020	Ken Farnum	89	Cyclist	United States (New York City)
4 April 2020	Lila Fenwick	87	Lawyer	United States (New York City)
4 April 2020	Carlos González-Artigas	72	Businessman	Ecuador (Guayaquil)
4 April 2020	Rhoda Hatch	73	Anti-war activist and public school educator	United States (Chicago)
4 April 2020	Vincent Lionti	60	Violist and conductor	United States (New York City)
4 April 2020	Leïla Menchari	92	Decorator and designer	France (Paris)
4 April 2020	Olan Montgomery	56	Actor and artist	United States (New York City)
4 April 2020	Marcel Moreau	86	Writer	France (Bobigny)
4 April 2020	Jerrold Mundis	79	Author and speaker	United States (New York City)
4 April 2020	Anton Sebastianpillai	75	Doctor and author	United Kingdom (London)
4 April 2020	Muhammad Sirajul Islam	77	Politician	United States (Queens)
4 April 2020	Alexander Thynn, 7th Marquess of Bath	85	Peer and politician	United Kingdom (Bath)
4 April 2020	Naek L. Tobing	79	Doctor	Indonesia (Jakarta)
4 April 2020	Luis Eduardo Aute	76	Singer	Spain (Madrid)
4 April 2020	Ezio Vendrame	72	Footballer	Italy (Treviso)
5 April 2020	Lee Fierro	91	Actress	United States (Akron)
5 April 2020	Mahmoud Jibril	67	Politician	Egypt (Cairo)
5 April 2020	John Laws	74	Judge	United Kingdom (London)
5 April 2020	Michel Parisse	83	Historian	France (Paris)
5 April 2020	Ronnie Earle	78	Politician	United States (Austin)
5 April 2020	Dougie Morgan	73	Rugby union player	United Kingdom (Edinburgh)
5 April 2020	Belly Mujinga	47		United Kingdom (London)
6 April 2020	Helène Aylon	89	Ecofeminist artist	United States (New York City)
6 April 2020	Josep Maria Benet i Jornet	79	Playwright and screenwriter	Spain (Lleida)
6 April 2020	Alfonso Cortina	76	Businessman	Spain (Toledo)
6 April 2020	Brahm Kanchibhotla	66	Journalist	United States (Nassau County)
6 April 2020	Jacques Le Brun	88	Historian	France (Paris)
6 April 2020	Adlin Mair-Clarke	78	Athlete	United States (New York City)
6 April 2020	Mark Steiner	77	Mathematician and philosopher	Israel (Jerusalem)
6 April 2020	Stephen Sulyk	95	Archbishop	United States (Voorhees Township)
6 April 2020	Riay Tatary	72	Imam	Spain (Madrid)
6 April 2020	Jean-Marie Zoellé	75	Politician	Germany (Bonn)
6 April 2020	Radomir Antić	71	Football manager	Spain (Madrid)
7 April 2020	Roger Chappot	79	Ice hockey player	Switzerland
7 April 2020	Robert Chaudenson	82	Linguist	France (Aix-en-Provence)
7 April 2020	Barbara Smoker	96	Activist	United Kingdom (London)
7 April 2020	Christophe Pras	36	Rugby union player and coach	France (Lyon)
7 April 2020	Jean-Laurent Cochet	85	Actor and director	France (Paris)
7 April 2020	Eddy Davis	79	Jazz banjoist and bandleader	United States (New York City)
7 April 2020	Jacques Frémontier	89	Journalist and television producer	France (Paris)
7 April 2020	Allen Garfield	80	Actor	United States (Los Angeles)
7 April 2020	Henry Graff	98	Historian	United States (Greenwich)
7 April 2020	Leib Groner	88	Rabbi	United States (New York City)
7 April 2020	Hudeidi	89	Composer	United Kingdom (London)
7 April 2020	Mishik Kazaryan	72	Physicist	Russia (Moscow)
7 April 2020	Jan Křen	89	Historian, academic, and dissident	Czech Republic (Prague)
7 April 2020	John Percy Leon Lewis	77	Military officer	Guyana (Georgetown)
7 April 2020	Roger Matthews	71	Criminologist	United Kingdom
7 April 2020	Yaakov Perlow	89	Rabbi	United States (Brooklyn)
7 April 2020	John Prine	73	Singer and songwriter	United States (Nashville)
7 April 2020	Nipper Read	95	Police officer and boxing administrator	United Kingdom
7 April 2020	Donato Sabia	56	Athlete	Italy (Potenza)
7 April 2020	Tom Scully	89	Priest and gaelic football manager	Ireland (Dublin)
7 April 2020	Miguel Ángel Tábet	78	Theologian and exegete	Italy (Rome)
7 April 2020	Joaquim Tosas	74	Politician and engineer	Spain (Barcelona)
7 April 2020	Ghyslain Tremblay	68	Actor and comedian	Canada (Verdun)
7 April 2020	Hal Willner	64	Music producer	United States (New York City)
8 April 2020	Leila Benitez-McCollum	89	Television and radio host	United States (New York City)
8 April 2020	Tom Blackwell	82	Artist	United States (Poughkeepsie)
8 April 2020	Richard L. Brodsky	73	Politician	United States (Greenburgh)
8 April 2020	Robert L. Carroll	81	Paleontologist	Canada (Westmount)
8 April 2020	Martin S. Fox	95	Publisher	United States (Millburn)
8 April 2020	Miguel Jones	81	Footballer	Spain (Madrid)
8 April 2020	Bernie Juskiewicz	77	Politician	United States (Montpelier)
8 April 2020	Francesco La Rosa	93	Footballer	Italy (Milan)
8 April 2020	Henri Madelin	83	Priest and theologian	France (Lille)
8 April 2020	Liliane Marchais	84	Activist	France (Bry-sur-Marne)
8 April 2020	Rick May	79	Voice actor, theatrical performer, director, and teacher	United States (Seattle)
8 April 2020	David Méresse	89	Footballer and coach	France (Neuville-Saint-Rémy)
8 April 2020	Ilona Murai Kerman	96	Dancer	United States (New Hyde Park)
8 April 2020	Joel J. Kupperman	83	Philosopher and author	United States (Brooklyn)
8 April 2020	Hiphei	82	Politician	India (Aizawl)
9 April 2020	Tullio Abbate	75	Businessman and motorboat racer	Italy (Milan)
9 April 2020	Reggie Bagala	54	Politician	United States (Raceland)
9 April 2020	Marc Engels	54	Sound engineer	Belgium (Brussels)
9 April 2020	Harvey Goldstein	80	Statistician	United Kingdom
9 April 2020	Ho Kam-ming	94	Martial artist	Canada (Toronto)
9 April 2020	Theresa M. Korn	93	Engineer and airplane pilot	United States (Wenatchee)
9 April 2020	Maria Alice de Marsillac Plunkett	78	Architect, designer and châtelaine	Ireland (Navan)
9 April 2020	Lee Nurse	43	Cricketer	United Kingdom (Basingstoke)
9 April 2020	Roberto Román Valencia	75	Journalist	Ecuador (Guayaquil)
9 April 2020	Vitor Sapienza	86	Politician	Brazil (São Paulo)
9 April 2020	Dmitri Smirnov	71	Composer	United Kingdom (London)
9 April 2020	Ida Schuster	101	Actress	United Kingdom (Glasgow)
10 April 2020	Rifat Chadirji	93	Architect, photographer, and activist	United Kingdom (London)
10 April 2020	Frits Flinkevleugel	80	Footballer	Netherlands (Amsterdam)
10 April 2020	Samuel Hargress II	84	Club owner	United States (New York City)
10 April 2020	Ceybil Jefferies	57–58	Singer	United States (Brooklyn)
10 April 2020	Pino van Lamsweerde	79	Director	France (Paris)
10 April 2020	Michel Lelong	95	Priest	France (Paris)
10 April 2020	Marianne Lundquist	88	Swimmer	Sweden (Stockholm)
10 April 2020	Enrique Múgica	88	Politician	Spain (Madrid)
10 April 2020	Bas Mulder	88	Priest	Netherlands (Boxmeer)
10 April 2020	Jacob Plange-Rhule	62	Doctor	Ghana (Accra)
10 April 2020	Ing Yoe Tan	71	Politician	Netherlands (Amsterdam)
10 April 2020	Iris M. Zavala	83	Author and activist	Spain (Madrid)
11 April 2020	Simon Barrington-Ward	89	Bishop	United Kingdom
11 April 2020	Hélène Châtelain	84	Actress and director	France (Paris)
11 April 2020	Stanley Chera	77	Real estate executive	United States (New York City)
11 April 2020	David Cohen	102	Soldier and schoolteacher	United States (Longmeadow)
11 April 2020	John Horton Conway	82	Mathematician	United States (New Brunswick)
11 April 2020	Wynn Handman	97	Artistic director	United States (New York City)
11 April 2020	Gillian Wise	84	Abstract artist	France (Chanteloup-les-Vignes)
11 April 2020	Edem Kodjo	81	Politician	France (Paris)
11 April 2020	Pablo Puente Aparicio	74	Architect and university professor	Spain (Valladolid)
11 April 2020	Luciano Pellicani	81	Sociologist	Italy
12 April 2020	Francisco Aritmendi	81	Athlete	Spain (Guadalajara)
12 April 2020	Brian Arrowsmith	79	Footballer and manager	United Kingdom
12 April 2020	Eliyahu Bakshi-Doron	79	Rabbi	Israel (Jerusalem)
12 April 2020	Maurice Barrier	87	Actor and singer	France (Montbard)
12 April 2020	Claude Beauchamp	80	Journalist, publisher, and political activist	Canada (Montreal)
12 April 2020	Tim Brooke-Taylor	79	Actor and comedian	United Kingdom (Cookham)
12 April 2020	Victor Batista Falla	87	Editor and publisher	Cuba (Havana)
12 April 2020	André Manaranche	93	Priest and theologian	France (Lille)
12 April 2020	Joel M. Reed	86	Filmmaker and screenwriter	United States (New York City)
12 April 2020	Jaime Ruiz Sacristán	70	Banker	Mexico (Mexico City)
12 April 2020	Carlos Seco Serrano	96	Historian	Spain (Madrid)
12 April 2020	Khalif Mumin Tohow	58	Politician	Somalia (Mogadishu)
12 April 2020	Samuel Wembé	73	Politician	Cameroon (Douala)
12 April 2020	Tom Woewiyu	74	Politician	United States (Bryn Mawr)
12 April 2020	Jacques De Decker	74	Writer	Belgium (Brussels)
13 April 2020	Baldiri Alavedra	76	Footballer	Spain (Gavà)
13 April 2020	Gil Bailey	84	Radio broadcaster	United States (New York City)
13 April 2020	Jerzy Główczewski	97	Military officer	United States (New York City)
13 April 2020	Juan Cotino	70	Politician	Spain (Valencia)
13 April 2020	Jens Erik Fenstad	84	Mathematician	Norway (Bærum)
13 April 2020	Jerry Givens	67	Executioner and anti-death penalty advocate	United States (Richmond)
13 April 2020	Philippe Lécrivain	78	Jesuit priest and historian	France (Paris)
13 April 2020	Thomas Kunz	81	Biologist	United States (Dedham)
13 April 2020	Sarah Maldoror	90	Filmmaker	France (Fontenay-lès-Briis)
13 April 2020	Dennis G. Peters	82	Electrochemist	United States (Bloomington)
13 April 2020	Avrohom Pinter	71	Rabbi and politician	United Kingdom (London)
13 April 2020	Zafar Sarfraz	50	Cricketer	Pakistan (Peshawar)
13 April 2020	Javier Santamaría	69	Politician	Spain (Valladolid)
13 April 2020	Bernard Stalter	63	Politician	France (Strasbourg)
13 April 2020	José Marroquín Yerovi	76	Priest	Ecuador (Guayaquil)
13 April 2020	Ann Sullivan	95	Animator	United States (Los Angeles)
13 April 2020	Ashok Desai	88	Politician	India
13 April 2020	John Dennis	88	Bishop	United Kingdom
14 April 2020	Haydar Baş	73	Politician	Turkey (Trabzon)
14 April 2020	Helen Damico	89	Literary scholar	United States (Akron)
14 April 2020	Danny Delaney	77	Gaelic footballer and hurler	Ireland (Portlaoise)
14 April 2020	Aldo di Cillo Pagotto	70	Bishop	Brazil (Fortaleza)
14 April 2020	Margit Feldman	90	Holocaust survivor	United States (Somerset)
14 April 2020	William H. Gerdts	91	Art historian	United States (White Plains)
14 April 2020	Michael Gilkes	86	Writer	United Kingdom (London)
14 April 2020	Cyril Lawrence	99	Footballer	United Kingdom (Farnworth)
14 April 2020	Miodrag Lazić	63	Doctor and writer	Serbia (Niš)
14 April 2020	Maria de Sousa	80	Doctor	Portugal (Lisbon)
14 April 2020	Ella King Russell Torrey	94	Human rights activist and press officer	United States (Philadelphia)
14 April 2020	Peter Whiteside	67	Modern pentathlete	United Kingdom (Peterborough)
14 April 2020	Ezio Bosso	48	Composer	Italy (Bologna)
15 April 2020	Adam Alsing	51	Radio and television host	Sweden (Stockholm)
15 April 2020	Allen Daviau	77	Cinematographer	United States (Los Angeles)
15 April 2020	Ranjit Chowdhry	64	Actor	India (Mumbai)
15 April 2020	Henry Grimes	84	Bassist	United States (New York City)
15 April 2020	John Houghton	88	Atmospheric physicist	United Kingdom (Dolgellau)
15 April 2020	Milena Jelinek	84	Screenwriter	United States (New York City)
15 April 2020	Lee Konitz	92	Composer and jazz saxophonist	United States (New York City)
15 April 2020	Bruce Myers	78	Actor and comedian	France (Paris)
15 April 2020	John Pfahl	81	Photographer	United States (Buffalo)
15 April 2020	Shahin Shahablou	56	Photographer	United Kingdom (London)
15 April 2020	Gérard Mulumba Kalemba	82	Bishop	Democratic Republic of the Congo (Kinshasa)
15 April 2020	Augusto Itúrburu	40	Sports journalist	Ecuador (Guayaquil)
15 April 2020	Ülkü Azrak	86–87	Academic and lawyer	Turkey (Istanbul)
15 April 2020	Ann Sayer	84	Rower	United Kingdom
16 April 2020	Francesco Di Carlo	79	Mobster and pentito	France (Paris)
16 April 2020	Jim Fraser	83	American football player	United States (Lansdale)
16 April 2020	Santiago Lanzuela	71	Politician	Spain (Madrid)
16 April 2020	Henry Miller	89	Lawyer and jurist	United States (Mamaroneck)
16 April 2020	Christophe	74	Singer	France (Brest)
16 April 2020	Luis Sepúlveda	70	Writer	Spain (Oviedo)
16 April 2020	Glider Ushñahua	51	Politician	Peru (Pucallpa)
16 April 2020	Howard Finkel	69	Wrestling announcer	United States (Madison)
17 April 2020	Bennie G. Adkins	86	Military officer	United States (Opelika)
17 April 2020	Norman Hunter	76	Footballer	United Kingdom (Leeds)
17 April 2020	Abba Kyari	67	Lawyer	Nigeria (Lagos)
17 April 2020	Giuseppi Logan	84	Jazz saxophonist	United States (Queens)
17 April 2020	Enrico Comba	63	Historian and anthropologist	Italy (Saluzzo)
17 April 2020	Iris Love	86	Archaeologist	United States (New York City)
17 April 2020	Lukman Niode	56	Swimmer	Indonesia (Jakarta)
17 April 2020	Arlene Saunders	89	Singer	United States (New York City)
17 April 2020	Matthew Seligman	64	Bassist	United Kingdom (London)
17 April 2020	Gene Shay	85	Disc jockey	United States (Wynnewood)
17 April 2020	Jesús Vaquero	70	Neurosurgeon	Spain (Madrid)
17 April 2020	Corrado Lamberti	72	Astrophysicist and science journalist	Italy (Gravedona)
18 April 2020	Erik Belfrage	74	Diplomat and businessman	Sweden (Stockholm)
18 April 2020	Gulshan Ewing	92	Journalist	United Kingdom (London)
18 April 2020	Gangchen Tulku Rinpoche	78	Lama	Italy (Verbania)
18 April 2020	Eva Konrad Hawkins	90	Biologist and professor	United States (The Bronx)
18 April 2020	Sékou Kourouma	65	Politician	Guinea (Conakry)
18 April 2020	Bob Lazier	81	Racing driver	United States (Denver)
18 April 2020	Jack Lotz	86	Wrestling referee	United States (Yonkers)
18 April 2020	Urano Navarrini	74	Footballer and manager	Italy (Milan)
18 April 2020	Jacques Rosny	81	Actor	France (Nogent-sur-Marne)
18 April 2020	Bernice Silver	106	Puppeteer and activist	United States (Englewood)
18 April 2020	Emma Weigley	87	Nutritionist	United States (South Philadelphia)
19 April 2020	Steve Dalkowski	80	Baseball player	United States (New Britain)
19 April 2020	Noach Dear	66	Judge	United States (Brooklyn)
19 April 2020	Terry Doran	80	Pop music manager and music publishing executive	United Kingdom (London)
19 April 2020	Claude Lafortune	83	Paper sculptor, set designer, and television personality	Canada (Longueuil)
19 April 2020	Philippe Nahon	81	Actor	France (Paris)
19 April 2020	Sergio Onofre Jarpa	99	Politician	Chile (Las Condes)
19 April 2020	Alexander Vustin	76	Composer	Russia (Moscow)
20 April 2020	Heherson Alvarez	80	Politician	Philippines (Manila)
20 April 2020	H. G. Carrillo	59	Novelist	United States (Washington)
20 April 2020	Claude Evrard	86	Actor	France (Clamart)
20 April 2020	Emeterio Gómez	78	Economist	Spain (Canary Islands)
20 April 2020	Tom Mulholland	84	Gaelic footballer	Ireland (Drogheda)
20 April 2020	Manjeet Singh Riyat	52	Doctor	United Kingdom (Derby)
20 April 2020	Josep Sala Mañé	82	Casteller	Spain (Vilafranca del Penedès)
20 April 2020	Jiří Toman	81	Jurist and professor	Switzerland (Geneva)
20 April 2020	Gertrude Rwakatare	69	Politician	Tanzania (Dar es Salaam)
21 April 2020	Dave Bacuzzi	79	Footballer	Ireland (Dublin)
21 April 2020	Jonathan Bardon	78	Historian and author	United Kingdom (Belfast)
21 April 2020	Muhammad Afzal	81	Wrestler	United States (New York City)
21 April 2020	Belco Bah	62	Politician	Mali (Niono)
21 April 2020	José María Calleja	64	Political activist	Spain (Madrid)
21 April 2020	Richard Fenno	93	Political scientist	United States (Mount Kisco)
21 April 2020	Philip Foglia	69	Lawyer and activist	United States (New York City)
21 April 2020	Jack Taylor	84	Politician	United States (Steamboat Springs)
21 April 2020	Donald Kennedy	88	Scientist	United States (Redwood City)
21 April 2020	Teruyuki Okazaki	88	Karate master	United States (Philadelphia)
21 April 2020	Joel Rogosin	87	Television producer and writer	United States (Woodland Hills)
21 April 2020	Jacques Pellen	63	Guitarist	France (Brest)
21 April 2020	Gerson Peres	88	Politician	Brazil (Belém)
21 April 2020	Miguel Ángel Troitiño	72–73	Geographer	Spain (Madrid)
21 April 2020	Koos van den Berg	77	Politician	Netherlands (Nunspeet)
21 April 2020	Esteban Yáñez	35	Actor, musician, and blogger	Spain (Santiago de Compostela)
22 April 2020	El Príncipe Gitano	92	Singer and flamenco dancer	Spain (Mandayona)
22 April 2020	Samantha Fox	69	Adult actress	United States (New York City)
22 April 2020	Julian Perry Robinson	78	Chemist	United Kingdom
22 April 2020	Bootsie Barnes	82	Saxophonist	United States (Wynnewood)
22 April 2020	Sardar Ghulam Mustafa Khan Tareen	70	Politician	Pakistan (Quetta)
23 April 2020	Peter Gill	89	Golfer	United Kingdom (Maidstone)
23 April 2020	Fred the Godson	35	Rapper	United States (The Bronx)
23 April 2020	Kumiko Okae	63	Actress, voice actress, and television presenter	Japan (Tokyo)
23 April 2020	Henk Overgoor	75	Footballer	Netherlands (Amsterdam)
23 April 2020	Al Angrisani	70	Politician	United States (Plainsboro Township)
23 April 2020	Bernardino Lombao	82	Businessman	Spain
24 April 2020	Ebrahim Amini	94	Politician	Iran (Qom)
24 April 2020	Mike Huckaby	54	DJ	United States (Detroit)
24 April 2020	Carlos Ernesto Escobar Mejía	57	Prisoner	United States (National City)
24 April 2020	Yukio Okamoto	74	Diplomat and diplomatic analyst	Japan (Tokyo)
24 April 2020	Burton Rose	77	Nephrologist	United States (Wellesley)
24 April 2020	Yaakov Schwei	85	Rabbi	United States (Brooklyn)
24 April 2020	Gerald Slater	86	Public television executive and producer	United States (Washington)
25 April 2020	Alan Abel	91	Percussionist and music educator	United States (Wynnewood)
25 April 2020	Peter Brancazio	81	Physics professor and sports scientist	United States (Manhasset)
25 April 2020	Ricardo Brennand	92	Businessman, engineer, and art collector	Brazil (Recife)
25 April 2020	Henri Kichka	94	Holocaust survivor	Belgium (Brussels)
25 April 2020	Madeline Kripke	76	Book collector	United States (New York City)
25 April 2020	Robert Mandell	90	Conductor	United Kingdom (Leicester)
25 April 2020	Gunnar Seijbold	65	Photographer	Sweden (Stockholm)
26 April 2020	Emilio Allué	85	Bishop	United States (Boston)
26 April 2020	Laura Bernal	64	Diplomat	Ireland (Dublin)
26 April 2020	Miquéias Fernandes	69	Politician	Brazil (Manaus)
26 April 2020	John Rowlands	73	Footballer	United Kingdom (Holyhead)
26 April 2020	Badruddin Shaikh	67	Politician	India (Ahmedabad)
26 April 2020	Henri Weber	75	Politician	France (Avignon)
27 April 2020	Yehudah Jacobs	85	Rabbi	United States (Lakewood Township)
27 April 2020	James Mahoney	62	Pulmonologist and internist	United States (New York City)
27 April 2020	Asdrubal Bentes	80	Politician	Brazil (Belém)
27 April 2020	Yupadee Kobkulboonsiri	51	Jewelry designer	United States (Brooklyn)
27 April 2020	Francesco Perrone	89	Athlete	Italy (Bari)
27 April 2020	Troy Sneed	52	Singer	United States (Jacksonville)
27 April 2020	Chavalit Soemprungsuk	80	Painter, sculptor, and printmaker	Netherlands (Amsterdam)
27 April 2020	Rana Zoe Mungin	30	Writer and teacher	United States (Rochelle Park)
28 April 2020	David Boe	84	Organist	United States (Glenview)
28 April 2020	Georgianna Glose	74	Nun and activist	United States (Brooklyn)
28 April 2020	Musa Shanibov	85	Politician	Russia
28 April 2020	Silas Silvius Njiru	91	Bishop	Italy (Rivoli)
28 April 2020	Syahrul	59	Politician	Indonesia (Tanjung Pinang)
29 April 2020	Germano Celant	80	Art historian, critic, and curator	Italy (Milan)
29 April 2020	Lenora Garfinkel	89	Architect	United States (The Bronx)
29 April 2020	Martin Lovett	93	Cellist	United Kingdom (London)
29 April 2020	Dick Lucas	86	American football player	United States (Philadelphia)
29 April 2020	Richard Ndassa	61	Politician	Tanzania (Dodoma)
29 April 2020	Noel Walsh	84	Gaelic footballer, manager and administrator	Ireland (Ennis)
29 April 2020	Mohammed Goni	78	Politician	Nigeria (Maiduguri)
29 April 2020	Trevor Cherry	72	Footballer	United Kingdom
29 April 2020	Stefano Zacchetti	52	Academic	United Kingdom
30 April 2020	Suleiman Adamu	57	Politician	Nigeria (Keffi)
30 April 2020	Óscar Chávez	85	Singer	Mexico (Mexico City)
30 April 2020	Alyce Chenault Gullattee	91	Psychiatrist, medical school professor, and activist	United States (Rockville)
30 April 2020	Jean-Marc Manducher	71	Businessman and sports executive	France (Lyon)
30 April 2020	Sylvie Vincent	79	Anthropologist and ethnologist	Canada (Montreal)
30 April 2020	Yu Lihua	88	Writer	United States (Gaithersburg)
30 April 2020	Mouzawar Abdallah	78	Politician	Comoros (Moroni)
30 April 2020	Deepak Lal	80	Author	United Kingdom (London)
1 May 2020	Fernando Sandoval	77	Water polo player	Brazil (São Paulo)
1 May 2020	Gilbert Luis R. Centina III	72	Poet and writer	Spain (León)
1 May 2020	África Lorente	65	Politician	Spain (Castelldefels)
1 May 2020	Augustine Mahiga	74	Politician	Tanzania (Dodoma)
2 May 2020	Allah Yar Ansari	77	Politician	Pakistan (Sargodha)
2 May 2020	Justa Barrios	63	Home care worker and labor organizer	United States (Long Branch)
2 May 2020	Jim Cross	87	Ice hockey player and coach	United States (Savannah)
2 May 2020	John Paul Eberhard	93	Research architect and academic	United States (Gaithersburg)
2 May 2020	Jim Henderson	79	Politician	Canada (Toronto)
2 May 2020	Daniel S. Kemp	83	Organic chemist	United States (Concord)
2 May 2020	Ralph McGehee	92	Intelligence officer	United States (Falmouth)
2 May 2020	Munir Mangal	70	Police officer	Afghanistan (Kabul)
2 May 2020	John Ogilvie	91	Footballer	United Kingdom (Leicester)
2 May 2020	Meyer Rubin	96	Geologist	United States (Manassas)
2 May 2020	Ajay Kumar Tripathi	62	Jurist	India (New Delhi)
2 May 2020	Oliver Crewe	73	Gaelic footballer	Ireland (Dundalk)
3 May 2020	Dave Greenfield	71	Singer	United Kingdom
3 May 2020	Ömer Döngeloğlu	52	Theologian	Turkey (Başakşehir)
3 May 2020	Tendol Gyalzur	69	Humanitarian	Switzerland (Chur)
3 May 2020	Roy Lester	96	American football player and coach	United States (Rockville)
3 May 2020	Mohamed Ben Omar	55	Politician	Niger (Niamey)
4 May 2020	Aldir Blanc	73	Author and lyricist	Brazil (Rio de Janeiro)
4 May 2020	Gunnar Larsson	80	Sports administrator	Sweden (Gothenburg)
4 May 2020	Anna Mohr	75	Archaeologist and LGBT+ activist	Sweden (Stockholm)
4 May 2020	Motoko Fujishiro Huthwaite	92	Preservationist	United States (Westland)
4 May 2020	Dragan Vučić	64	Composer and singer	North Macedonia (Skopje)
4 May 2020	Garba Nadama	82	Politician	Nigeria
5 May 2020	João Kabeção	47	Skateboarder	Brazil (Armação dos Búzios)
5 May 2020	Brian Axsmith	57	Paleobotanist and ecology professor	United States (Mobile)
5 May 2020	Ciro Pessoa	62	Singer-songwriter	Brazil (São Paulo)
6 May 2020	Jacques Reymond	69	Ski trainer	Switzerland
7 May 2020	Princess Diana of Bourbon-Parma	87	Princess	Germany (Hamburg)
7 May 2020	Ty	47	Rapper	United Kingdom (London)
7 May 2020	E. Wayne Craven	89	Art historian	United States (Newark)
7 May 2020	Joyce Davidson	89	Television personality	Canada (Toronto)
7 May 2020	Antonio González Pacheco	73	Intelligence agent	Spain (Madrid)
7 May 2020	Daisy Lúcidi	90	Politician, actress, and radio broadcaster	Brazil (Rio de Janeiro)
7 May 2020	Joseph Zhu Baoyu	98	Bishop	China (Nanyang)
8 May 2020	Lúcia Braga	85	Politician	Brazil (João Pessoa)
8 May 2020	Daniel Cauchy	90	Actor and film producer	France (Neuilly-sur-Seine)
8 May 2020	Jesus Chediak	78	Actor and film director	Brazil (Rio de Janeiro)
8 May 2020	Vicente André Gomes	68	Politician	Brazil (Recife)
8 May 2020	Dimitris Kremastinos	78	Politician	Greece (Athens)
8 May 2020	Roy Horn	75	Magician and lion tamer	United States (Las Vegas)
8 May 2020	Carl Tighe	70	Author and academic	United Kingdom
9 May 2020	Johannes Beck	97	Priest and social ethicist	Germany (Munich)
9 May 2020	Carlos José	85	Singer-songwriter	Brazil (Rio de Janeiro)
9 May 2020	Abraham Palatnik	92	Artist and inventor	Brazil (Rio de Janeiro)
10 May 2020	David Corrêa	82	Singer-songwriter	Brazil (Rio de Janeiro)
10 May 2020	Anwarul Kabir Talukdar	76	Politician	Bangladesh (Dhaka)
10 May 2020	Subash Chouhan	74	Politician	India (Bhubaneswar)
10 May 2020	Georgia Litwack	98	Photographer and photojournalist	United States (Auburndale)
10 May 2020	Sérgio Sant'Anna	78	Writer	Brazil (Rio de Janeiro)
10 May 2020	Hari Vasudevan	79	Historian	India (Kolkata)
10 May 2020	Abdikani Mohamed Wa'ays	92	Diplomat	Kuwait
10 May 2020	Nita Pippins	93	Nurse and activist	United States (New York City)
11 May 2020	Alberto Carpani	64	Singer	Italy (Portofino)
11 May 2020	Oleg Ivanovich Kovalyov	71	Politician	Russia
12 May 2020	Renée Claude	80	Singer and actress	Canada (Montreal)
12 May 2020	Morris Hood III	54	Politician	United States (Ann Arbor)
12 May 2020	Clarence Mini	68	Doctor and AIDS activist	South Africa (Johannesburg)
12 May 2020	Ernest Vinberg	82	Mathematician	Russia (Moscow)
12 May 2020	Henriette Conté		First Lady of Guinea	Guinea
13 May 2020	Afwerki Abraha	71	Diplomat	United Kingdom (London)
13 May 2020	Anthony Bailey	87	Writer and art historian	United Kingdom (Harwich)
13 May 2020	Riad Ismat	72	Politician	United States (Chicago)
13 May 2020	Jean Lau Chin	75	Clinical psychologist	United States (Mineola)
13 May 2020	Shobushi	28	Sumo wrestler	Japan (Tokyo)
13 May 2020	Patrick Simon	64	Politician	France (Amiens)
13 May 2020	Yoshio	70	Singer	Mexico (Mexico City)
14 May 2020	Anisuzzaman	83	Writer and activist	Bangladesh (Dhaka)
14 May 2020	Hans Cohen	97	Microbiologist	Netherlands (Bosch en Duin)
14 May 2020	Joey Giambra	86	Jazz trumpeter	United States (Buffalo)
14 May 2020	Sally Rowley	88	Jewelry-maker and civil rights activist	United States (Tucson)
15 May 2020	Claes Borgström	75	Lawyer	Sweden (Stockholm)
15 May 2020	Paul McCurrie	91	Lawyer and politician	United States (Newark)
15 May 2020	John Palmer	77	Director and playwright	Canada (Ottawa)
15 May 2020	Olga Savary	86	Writer and literary critic	Brazil (Teresópolis)
15 May 2020	Umar Jauro Audi	53	Politician	Nigeria
16 May 2020	Mário Chermont	83	Politician	Brazil (Belém)
16 May 2020	Wilson Roosevelt Jerman	91	Butler	United States (Woodbridge)
16 May 2020	Pilar Pellicer	82	Actress	Mexico (Mexico City)
16 May 2020	Viktor Shudegov	67	Politician	Russia (Moscow)
16 May 2020	Hossein Kazempour Ardebili	67	Politician	Iran (Tehran)
17 May 2020	Wilson Braga	88	Politician	Brazil (João Pessoa)
17 May 2020	Rafael Fragoso	62	Businessman and sportsman	Brazil (Rio de Janeiro)
17 May 2020	Ratnakar Matkari	81	Writer and film producer	India (Mumbai)
17 May 2020	Ramona Medina	42	Writer and film producer	Argentina (Buenos Aires)
18 May 2020	Bill Olner	78	Politician	United Kingdom (Nuneaton)
18 May 2020	Vincent Malone	88	Bishop	United Kingdom (Liverpool)
18 May 2020	Craig Welch	71	Animator	Canada (Montreal)
18 May 2020	Minkailu Bah		Politician	Sierra Leone
19 May 2020	Annie Glenn	100	Disability rights advocate	United States (Saint Paul)
19 May 2020	Ken Nightingall	92	Sound engineer	United Kingdom (London)
19 May 2020	Gil Vianna	54	Politician	Brazil (Campos dos Goytacazes)
19 May 2020	Carlos Jirón	65	Politician	Nicaragua
20 May 2020	Viacheslav Belyi	74	Scientist	Russia (Troitsk)
20 May 2020	Syed Fazal Agha	78	Politician	Pakistan (Karachi)
20 May 2020	Denis Farkasfalvy	83	Priest and theologian	United States (Irving)
20 May 2020	Shaheen Raza	60	Politician	Pakistan (Lahore)
21 May 2020	Mary J. Wilson	83	Zookeeper	United States (Randallstown)
21 May 2020	Kamrun Nahar Putul	65	Politician	Bangladesh (Bogra)
21 May 2020	John Zdechlik	83	Composer	United States (White Bear Lake)
22 May 2020	Hecky Powell	72	Businessman and community leader	United States (Evanston)
23 May 2020	Jitendra Nath Pande	78	Doctor	India (New Delhi)
23 May 2020	Viswanathan Ratnam	87	Judge	India
24 May 2020	Mukar Cholponbayev	70	Politician	Kyrgyzstan (Bishkek)
24 May 2020	Makbul Hossain	70	Politician	Bangladesh (Dhaka)
24 May 2020	Hussain Ahmad Kanjo	64	Politician	Pakistan (Kanju)
24 May 2020	Dinaldo Wanderley	69	Politician	Brazil (João Pessoa)
25 May 2020	Ismail Gamadiid	59–60	Politician	Somalia (Mogadishu)
25 May 2020	Marv Luster	82	Canadian football player	United States (Matthews)
26 May 2020	Samvel Gasparov	81	Film director	Russia (Moscow)
26 May 2020	Vladimir Lopukhin	68	Politician	Russia (Moscow)
26 May 2020	Jon Hellevig	58	Lawyer	Russia (Moscow)
27 May 2020	Evelyn Nicol	89	Immunologist	United States (Weston)
27 May 2020	Nicholas Rinaldi	86	Poet and novelist	United States (Bridgeport)
27 May 2020	Billie Lee Turner	95	Botanist	United States (Round Rock)
28 May 2020	David Owen Brooks	65	Convicted murderer	United States (Galveston)
28 May 2020	Claude Goasguen	75	Politician	France (Issy-les-Moulineaux)
28 May 2020	Robert M. Laughlin	85	Anthropologist and linguist	United States (Arlington County)
28 May 2020	Celine Fariala Mangaza	52	Disabilities activist	Democratic Republic of the Congo (Bukavu)
28 May 2020	Eddie Mosley	73	Serial killer	United States (Marianna)
28 May 2020	Gracia Barrios	92	Painter	Chile
29 May 2020	Evaldo Gouveia	91	Singer-songwriter	Brazil (Fortaleza)
29 May 2020	Célio Taveira	79	Footballer	Brazil (João Pessoa)
29 May 2020	Bejan Daruwalla	88	Astrologist	India (Ahmedabad)
29 May 2020	Bhanwar Lal Sharma	95	Politician	India (Jaipur)
29 May 2020	Maikanti Baru	60	Engineer	Nigeria
30 May 2020	Edward O. Phillips	89	Writer	Canada
31 May 2020	Dan van Husen	75	Actor	United Kingdom (Ilminster)
1 June 2020	P Namgyal	83	Politician	India
1 June 2020	Pedro Ercílio Simon	79	Archbishop	Brazil (Passo Fundo)
2 June 2020	Jimy Raw	58	Television and radio host	Brazil (Rio de Janeiro)
2 June 2020	Ghulam Murtaza Baloch	55	Politician	Pakistan (Karachi)
2 June 2020	Munir Khan Orakzai	60	Politician	Pakistan (Karachi)
3 June 2020	Shaukat Manzoor Cheema	66	Politician	Pakistan (Lahore)
3 June 2020	Mian Jamshed Uddin Kakakhel	65	Politician	Pakistan (Islamabad)
3 June 2020	Adriano Silva	49	Politician	Brazil (Cuiabá)
3 June 2020	Maria Alice Vergueiro	85	Actress	Brazil (São Paulo)
3 June 2020	Conrad Worrill	79	Writer	United States (Chicago)
4 June 2020	Dulce Nunes	90	Actress and singer-songwriter	Brazil (Rio de Janeiro)
4 June 2020	Mikhail Kokshenov	83	Actor	Russia (Moscow)
5 June 2020	Carlos Lessa	83	Economist	Brazil (Rio de Janeiro)
5 June 2020	Antonio Rodríguez de las Heras	72	Historian	Spain (Madrid)
6 June 2020	Aslam Qureshi	66	Cricketer	Pakistan
6 June 2020	Dietmar Seyferth	91	Chemist	United States (Lexington)
7 June 2020	Manuel Felguérez	91	Abstract artist	Mexico (Mexico City)
7 June 2020	Lynika Strozier	35	Biologist	United States (Chicago)
7 June 2020	Lugi Gizenga	54	Politician	Democratic Republic of the Congo (Kinshasa)
8 June 2020	Sardar Dur Muhammad Nasir	61	Politician	Pakistan (Karachi)
8 June 2020	Pierre Nkurunziza	55	Politician	Burundi (Karuzi)
8 June 2020	Arjun Charan Sethi	78	Politician	India (Bhubaneswar)
9 June 2020	Anthony Obiagboso Enukeme	76	Businessman	Nigeria
9 June 2020	Luis Repetto	66	Museologist and television host	Peru (Lima)
9 June 2020	Seraphim	51	Bishop	Russia (Samara)
10 June 2020	J. Anbazhagan	62	Politician	India (Chennai)
10 June 2020	Haidari Wujodi	80–81	Poet and scholar	Afghanistan (Kabul)
12 June 2020	Ali Hadi	53	Footballer	Iraq (Baghdad)
12 June 2020	Chylgychy Ondar	64	Politician	Russia (Moscow)
12 June 2020	Gulzar Dehlvi	93	Poet	India (Noida)
12 June 2020	Parasnath Yadav	71	Politician	India
13 June 2020	Mohammed Nasim	72	Politician	Bangladesh (Dhaka)
13 June 2020	Sheikh Mohammed Abdullah	74	Politician	Bangladesh (Dhaka)
14 June 2020	Elsa Joubert	97	Writer	South Africa (Cape Town)
14 June 2020	Pierre Lumbi	70	Politician	Democratic Republic of the Congo (Kinshasa)
14 June 2020	Aarón Padilla Gutiérrez	77	Footballer	Mexico (Guadalajara)
14 June 2020	Haroldo Rodas	74	Politician	Guatemala (Guatemala City)
14 June 2020	Raj Mohan Vohra	88	Military officer	India (New Delhi)
14 June 2020	Ibidunni Ighodalo	40	Philanthropist	Nigeria
14 June 2020	Tawfiq al-Yasiri		Politician	Iraq (Al Diwaniyah)
14 June 2020	Nurul Haque Manik	55	Footballer	Bangladesh (Dhaka)
15 June 2020	Renato de Jesus	57	Politician	Brazil (Rio de Janeiro)
15 June 2020	José Gentil Rosa	80	Politician	Brazil (Teresina)
15 June 2020	Giulio Giorello	75	Philosopher, mathematician, and epistemologist	Italy (Milan)
15 June 2020	Adebayo Osinowo	64	Politician	Nigeria (Lagos)
15 June 2020	Badar Uddin Ahmed Kamran	69	Politician	Bangladesh (Dhaka)
15 June 2020	Nana Tuffour	66	Singer	Ghana
16 June 2020	Haribhau Jawale	67	Politician	India (Mumbai)
16 June 2020	Paulinho Paiakan	66	Tribal leader	Brazil (Redenção)
16 June 2020	Edén Pastora	83	Politician	Nicaragua (Managua)
17 June 2020	Mário Calixto Filho	73	Politician	Brazil (Porto Velho)
17 June 2020	Trần Ngọc Châu	96	Military officer and politician	United States (Los Angeles)
17 June 2020	Dan Foster	61	Radio personality	Nigeria (Lagos)
18 June 2020	Barbara Costikyan	91	Food writer	United States (Edgewater)
18 June 2020	Mikhail Ignatyev	58	Politician	Russia (Saint Petersburg)
19 June 2020	Thandi Mpambo-Sibhukwana		Politician	South Africa (Cape Town)
19 June 2020	A. L. Raghavan	87	Singer	India (Chennai)
20 June 2020	Sylvio Capanema	82	Jurist	Brazil (Rio de Janeiro)
20 June 2020	Joseph Ferris	85	Politician	United States (Brooklyn)
20 June 2020	John Luk Jok	68	Politician	South Sudan (Juba)
20 June 2020	Kamal Lohani	85	Journalist	Bangladesh (Dhaka)
20 June 2020	Mufti Muhammad Naeem	64	Scholar	Pakistan (Karachi)
21 June 2020	Marconi Alencar	81	Politician	Brazil (Fortaleza)
21 June 2020	Reynaldo Salazar	65	Athlete	Mexico (Mexico City)
21 June 2020	György Bálint	100	Politician and horticulturist	Hungary (Kistarcsa)
21 June 2020	Talib Jauhari	80	Islamic scholar	Pakistan (Karachi)
21 June 2020	Bernardino Piñera	104	Archbishop	Chile (Santiago)
21 June 2020	Ahmed Radhi	56	Footballer	Iraq (Baghdad)
21 June 2020	Ken Snow	50	Footballer	United States (Port Huron)
21 June 2020	Saroj Dubey	81	Politician	India (Noida)
22 June 2020	Carlos Luis Morales	55	Footballer	Ecuador (Samborondón)
22 June 2020	Nisar Ahmed Siddiqui	76	Academic	Pakistan (Karachi)
23 June 2020	Jean-Michel Bokamba-Yangouma	80	Politician	Republic of the Congo (Brazzaville)
23 June 2020	Arthur Keaveney	68	Historian	Ireland
23 June 2020	Jampel Lodoy	44	Lama	Russia (Kyzyl)
23 June 2020	César Bosco Vivas Robelo	78	Bishop	Nicaragua (Managua)
24 June 2020	Bernaldina José Pedro	75	Tribal leader	Brazil (Boa Vista)
24 June 2020	Mohammed Yaseen Mohammed	57	Weightlifter	Sweden (Örebro)
25 June 2020	Abiola Ajimobi	70	Politician	Nigeria (Lagos)
25 June 2020	Papaléo Paes	67	Politician and physician	Brazil (Macapá)
26 June 2020	Munawar Hasan	78	Politician	Pakistan (Karachi)
26 June 2020	Félix de Almeida Mendonça	92	Politician	Brazil (Salvador)
26 June 2020	Faqir Nabi	67	Actor	Afghanistan (Kabul)
27 June 2020	Antonio Cuenco	84	Politician	Philippines (Cebu City)
27 June 2020	Ilija Petković	74	Footballer and coach	Serbia (Belgrade)
28 June 2020	Nasir Ajanah	64	Judge	Nigeria (Gwagwalada)
28 June 2020	Md. Shahjahan Ali Talukder	65	Politician	Bangladesh (Dhaka)
29 June 2020	Abdullah al Mohsin Chowdhury	57	Politician	Bangladesh (Dhaka)
29 June 2020	Kamruddin Ahia Khan Majlish	66	Politician	Bangladesh (Dhaka)
29 June 2020	Marlene Herrera Díaz	69	Politician	Mexico
1 July 2020	José-Itamar de Freitas	85	Journalist	Brazil (Rio de Janeiro)
1 July 2020	Kwadwo Owusu Afriyie	63	Politician	Ghana (Accra)
1 July 2020	Santiago Manuin Valera	63	Indigenous leader	Peru (Chiclayo)
1 July 2020	Edward A. Burkhalter	91	Military officer	United States (Annapolis)
1 July 2020	Eurídice Moreira	81	Politician	Brazil (João Pessoa)
2 July 2020	Wahab Adegbenro	65	Doctor	Nigeria
2 July 2020	Nikolai Kapustin	82	Composer	Russia (Moscow)
2 July 2020	Wanderley Mariz	79	Politician	Brazil (Natal)
2 July 2020	Riaz Sheikh	51	Cricketer	Pakistan (Karachi)
3 July 2020	Manuel Machado Alvarez	59	Convicted murderer	United States (San Quentin)
3 July 2020	Scott Erskine	57	Serial killer	United States (San Quentin)
3 July 2020	Abdulmanap Nurmagomedov	57	Wrestler	Russia (Moscow)
3 July 2020	Mamadou Bamba Ndiaye	71	Politician	Senegal (Dakar)
4 July 2020	Bhakti Charu Swami	74	Spiritual teacher	United States (Florida City)
4 July 2020	Brandis Kemp	76	Actress	United States (Los Angeles)
4 July 2020	T. M. Giasuddin Ahmed	83	Politician	Bangladesh (Dhaka)
5 July 2020	Ragaa Al Geddawy	85	Actress	Egypt (Ismailia)
5 July 2020	Antônio Bivar	81	Author and playwright	Brazil (São Paulo)
5 July 2020	Mário Coelho	84	Bullfighter	Portugal (Vila Franca de Xira)
5 July 2020	Nick Cordero	41	Actor and singer	United States (Los Angeles)
5 July 2020	Ayatullah Durrani	64	Politician	Pakistan (Quetta)
5 July 2020	Mahendra Yadav	70	Politician	India (New Delhi)
6 July 2020	Inuwa Abdulkadir	54	Politician	Nigeria (Sokoto)
6 July 2020	Suresh Amonkar	68	Politician	India (Panaji)
6 July 2020	Domingos Mãhörõ	60	Activist and cacique	Brazil (Cuiabá)
6 July 2020	Julio Jimenez	55	Politician	Bolivia (Cochabamba)
6 July 2020	Gordon Kegakilwe	53	Politician	South Africa (Klerksdorp)
6 July 2020	Chynybaĭ Tursunbekov	59	Politician	Kyrgyzstan (Bishkek)
7 July 2020	Hernán Alemán	65	Politician	Colombia (Bogotá)
8 July 2020	Ricardo Mthembu	50	Politician	South Africa (KwaDukuza)
8 July 2020	Noloyiso Sandile	56	Regent of the Royal House of the AmaRharhabe	South Africa (Mdantsane)
8 July 2020	Howard Schoenfield	62	Tennis player	United States (South Beach)
8 July 2020	Houshang Seddigh	72	Military officer	Iran (Tehran)
9 July 2020	Sahara Khatun	77	Politician	Thailand (Bangkok)
9 July 2020	Mohamed Kouradji	68	Football referee	Algeria (Constantine)
10 July 2020	Corra Dirksen	82	Rugby player	South Africa (Vereeniging)
10 July 2020	Ghaida Kambash	46	Politician	Iraq (Baghdad)
10 July 2020	Cosmas Magaya	66	Mbira player	Zimbabwe (Harare)
10 July 2020	Tom Manthata	80	Activist	South Africa (Pretoria)
12 July 2020	Raymundo Capetillo	76	Actor	Mexico (Mexico City)
12 July 2020	Nelson Meurer	77	Politician	Brazil (Francisco Beltrão)
12 July 2020	Mandela Kapere	38	Politician	Namibia
12 July 2020	Hassan Abshir Farah	75	Politician	Turkey (Ankara)
12 July 2020	Alfred Mtsi	69	Politician	South Africa (East London)
12 July 2020	Tapan Ghosh	67	Politician	India (Kolkata)
12 July 2020	Mohamed Abdi Hashi	74	Politician	Kenya (Nairobi)
13 July 2020	Hasan al-Lawzi	68	Politician	Egypt (Cairo)
13 July 2020	Gerardo Juraci Campelo Leite	88	Politician	Brazil (Teresina)
13 July 2020	Luis Arias Graziani	94	Politician	Peru (Lima)
13 July 2020	Nurul Islam Babul	74	Businessman	Bangladesh (Dhaka)
13 July 2020	Kenneth Church	60	Jockey	United States (Reno)
13 July 2020	Zindzi Mandela	59	Diplomat	South Africa (Johannesburg)
13 July 2020	Moses Costa	69	Archbishop	Bangladesh (Dhaka)
14 July 2020	Muhammad Mohaiminul Islam	78	Military officer	Bangladesh (Dhaka)
14 July 2020	Caesar Korolenko	86	Psychiatrist	Russia (Novosibirsk)
14 July 2020	Benjamin Rabenorolahy	80	Politician	Madagascar (Antananarivo)
14 July 2020	Stephen Susman	79	Attorney	United States (Houston)
14 July 2020	Abolghasem Sarhaddizadeh	75	Politician	Iran (Tehran)
15 July 2020	Kenny Dale	68	Country singer	United States (San Antonio)
15 July 2020	Sayed Haider	94	Physician and cultural activist	Bangladesh (Dhaka)
15 July 2020	Eugenio Scarpellini	66	Bishop	Bolivia (El Alto)
15 July 2020	Igor Chernykh	88	Cinematographer	Russia (Moscow)
15 July 2020	Younus Soomro		Politician	Pakistan
16 July 2020	Patrick Ellis	77	Radio personality	United States (Annapolis)
16 July 2020	Cornelius Mwalwanda	75	Politician	Malawi (Lilongwe)
16 July 2020	Elmer Pato	66	Taekwondo practitioner	Philippines
16 July 2020	Pamela Rush	49	Poet and civil rights activist	United States (Selma)
16 July 2020	Neela Satyanarayanan	72	Author and civil servant	India (Mumbai)
16 July 2020	Víctor Víctor	71	Singer-songwriter	Dominican Republic (Santo Domingo)
17 July 2020	Moussa Benhamadi	67	Politician	Algeria (Bordj Bou Arréridj)
17 July 2020	Angela von Nowakonski	67	Physician	Brazil (Campinas)
18 July 2020	Charles Bukeko	58	Actor and comedian	Kenya (Nairobi)
18 July 2020	Katherine B. Hoffman	105	Chemist	United States (Tallahassee)
18 July 2020	Matinul Haq Usama Qasmi	53	Scholar	India (Kanpur)
18 July 2020	Moonyeenn Lee	76	Casting director	South Africa (Johannesburg)
18 July 2020	Martha Mmola		Politician	South Africa
18 July 2020	Jaybee Sebastian	40	Convicted gang leader	Philippines (Muntinlupa)
18 July 2020	David Romero Ellner	65	Politician and convicted rapist	Honduras (Tegucigalpa)
18 July 2020	Henrique Soares da Costa	57	Bishop	Brazil (Recife)
18 July 2020	Myrzageldy Kemel	71	Politician	Kazakhstan
18 July 2020	Manuel C. Sobreviñas	96	Bishop	Philippines (Manila)
19 July 2020	Margaret Waterchief	88	Tribal elder	Canada (Strathmore)
19 July 2020	César Salinas	58	Businessman	Bolivia (La Paz)
19 July 2020	Nikolai Tanayev	74	Politician	Russia (Saint Petersburg)
20 July 2020	Ruth Lewis	77	Nun	Pakistan (Karachi)
20 July 2020	Jorge Villavicencio	62	Politician	Guatemala (Guatemala City)
20 July 2020	Muhammad Aslam	73	Jurist	Pakistan (Rawalpindi)
21 July 2020	Dobby Dobson	78	Singer and record producer	United States (Coral Springs)
21 July 2020	Lalji Tandon	85	Politician	India (Lucknow)
21 July 2020	Cheikh Sadibou Fall	69	Politician	France (Paris)
22 July 2020	Eulogius	83	Bishop	Russia (Moscow)
22 July 2020	Sunil Kumar Singh	71	Politician	India
22 July 2020	Theo Diergaardt	50	Politician	Namibia
23 July 2020	Hassan Brijany	59	Actor	Sweden
23 July 2020	Tomas Joson III	72	Politician	Philippines (Cabanatuan)
24 July 2020	Claudio Zupo	35	Judoka	Mexico (Sonora)
25 July 2020	Steve dePyssler	101	Military officer	United States (Bossier City)
25 July 2020	José Mentor	71	Politician	Brazil (São Paulo)
25 July 2020	Božidar Milenković	66	Footballer and coach	Serbia (Belgrade)
25 July 2020	Helen Jones Woods	96	Jazz trombonist	United States (Sarasota)
25 July 2020	Mohammed Shahidullah	56	Military officer	Bangladesh (Dhaka)
25 July 2020	Kenzhegali Abenovich Sagadiyev	82	Politician	Kazakhstan (Astana)
25 July 2020	Hannes Combrinck	49	Politician	South Africa (Karos)
26 July 2020	Alireza Raheb	53	Poet, songwriter, and literary critic	Iran (Tehran)
27 July 2020	Israfil Alam	54	Politician	Bangladesh (Dhaka)
27 July 2020	Felicia F. Campbell	89	Lecturer	United States (Las Vegas)
27 July 2020	AKM Amanul Islam Chowdhury	83	Political advisor	Bangladesh (Dhaka)
27 July 2020	Frank Howard	81	Politician	United States (Alexandria)
27 July 2020	Rodrigo Rodrigues	45	Television host, writer, and musician	Brazil (Rio de Janeiro)
28 July 2020	Marcel Plasman	95	Politician	Belgium
28 July 2020	Bill Montgomery	80	Activist	United States
28 July 2020	Badr al-Zaman Gharib	91	Linguist	Iran
29 July 2020	Salko Bukvarević	53	Politician	Bosnia and Herzegovina (Sarajevo)
29 July 2020	Sheikh Md. Nurul Haque	79	Politician	Bangladesh (Dhaka)
29 July 2020	Hernán Pinto	67	Politician	Chile (Viña del Mar)
29 July 2020	Perrance Shiri	65	Politician and military leader	Zimbabwe (Harare)
30 July 2020	Herman Cain	74	Businessman, writer, and political activist	United States (Stockbridge)
30 July 2020	Sonam Tshering Lepcha	92	Composer	India (Kalimpong)
31 July 2020	Bill Mack	88	Singer, songwriter, and radio host	United States (Irving)
31 July 2020	Zamuxolo Peter	55	Politician	South Africa (Makhanda)
31 July 2020	Musa Yerniyazov	72	Politician	Uzbekistan (Nukus)
31 July 2020	R. D. Pradhan	92	Politician	India
1 August 2020	Pydikondala Manikyala Rao	58	Politician	India (Vijayawada)
1 August 2020	Khosrow Sinai	79	Film director	Iran (Tehran)
2 August 2020	Gregory Areshian	71	Archeologist and historian	Armenia (Yerevan)
2 August 2020	Kamal Rani Varun	62	Politician	India (Lucknow)
2 August 2020	Tootie Robbins	62	American football player	United States (Chandler)
2 August 2020	Umesh Dastane	63	Cricketer	India
2 August 2020	Satyanarayan Singh	77	Politician	India (Patna)
3 August 2020	ATM Alamgir	70	Politician	Bangladesh (Dhaka)
3 August 2020	Dani Anwar	52	Politician	Indonesia (Jakarta)
3 August 2020	Homayoun Reza Atardi	50	Film and television producer	Iran (Tehran)
3 August 2020	Mohammad Barkatullah	76	Television producer	Bangladesh (Dhaka)
3 August 2020	Laverne Lewycky	74	Politician	Canada (Dauphin)
3 August 2020	Satyanarayan Singh	97	Politician	India
4 August 2020	Sunnam Rajaiah	59	Politician	India (Vijayawada)
4 August 2020	Karam Ali Shah	86	Politician	Pakistan (Islamabad)
5 August 2020	Gésio Amadeu	73	Actor	Brazil (São Paulo)
5 August 2020	Shivajirao Patil Nilangekar	88	Politician	India (Pune)
5 August 2020	Muhammad Tariq al-Khadra	88	Military officer	Syria (Damascus)
5 August 2020	Aritana Yawalapiti	71	Indigenous rights activist, cacique, and ecologist	Brazil (Goiânia)
5 August 2020	Manabendra Bandyopadhyay	79	Writer	India (Pune)
5 August 2020	Anil Rathod	70	Politician	India (Ahmednagar)
6 August 2020	Shyamal Chakraborty	76	Politician	India (Kolkata)
7 August 2020	Ramadhan Seif Kajembe	98	Politician	Kenya
7 August 2020	Lungile Pepeta	46	Paediatric cardiologist	South Africa (Bizana)
7 August 2020	Nina Popova	97	Dancer	United States (St. Augustine)
7 August 2020	Ángela Salazar	66	Activist	Colombia (Apartadó)
7 August 2020	Stephen F. Williams	83	Judge	United States (Washington)
7 August 2020	Michael Ojo	27	Basketball player	Serbia (Belgrade)
7 August 2020	Rogério Teófilo	63	Politician	Brazil
8 August 2020	Bernard Fils-Aimé	67	Entrepreneur and activist	United States (Miami)
8 August 2020	Buruji Kashamu	62	Politician	Nigeria (Lagos)
8 August 2020	Alfredo Lim	90	Politician	Philippines (Manila)
8 August 2020	Nandi Yellaiah	78	Politician	India (Hyderabad)
8 August 2020	Adrian Barber	82	Musician	United States (Hilo)
9 August 2020	Kamala	70	Professional wrestler	United States (Oxford)
9 August 2020	Andréia de Olicar	44	Singer and composer	Brazil (Itaocara)
9 August 2020	Bhai Lal	67	Politician	India
10 August 2020	Nadjmi Adhani	50	Politician	Indonesia (Banjarbaru)
11 August 2020	Sixto Brillantes	80	Lawyer	Philippines (Manila)
11 August 2020	Rahat Indori	70	Lyricist and painter	India (Indore)
11 August 2020	Trini Lopez	83	Singer and actor	United States (Palm Springs)
11 August 2020	Dilip Barooah	63	Writer	India
12 August 2020	Mac Jack	55	Politician	South Africa (Kimberley)
12 August 2020	Gulsaira Momunova	82	Journalist and poet	Kyrgyzstan (Bishkek)
13 August 2020	Frank Brew	92	Australian rules footballer	Australia
13 August 2020	Gulnazar Keldi	74	Lyricist and poet	Tajikistan (Dushanbe)
13 August 2020	Darío Vivas	70	Politician	Venezuela (Caracas)
13 August 2020	Essam el-Erian	66	Politician	Egypt (Cairo)
14 August 2020	Surendra Prakash Goel	74	Politician	India (Delhi)
14 August 2020	Moisés Mamani	50	Politician	Peru (Lima)
15 August 2020	Murtaja Baseer	87	Painter	Bangladesh (Dhaka)
15 August 2020	Vimala Sharma	93	First Lady of India	India (Bhopal)
16 August 2020	Chetan Chauhan	73	Politician and cricketer	India (Gurgaon)
16 August 2020	Esther Morales	70	First Lady of Bolivia	Bolivia (Oruro)
16 August 2020	Caio Narcio	33	Politician	Brazil (São Paulo)
16 August 2020	Danny Campbell	76	Footballer	South Africa
17 August 2020	Elsimar M. Coutinho	90	Doctor	Brazil (São Paulo)
17 August 2020	Chaim Dov Keller	90	Rabbi	United States (Chicago)
17 August 2020	Nishikant Kamat	50	Actor	India (Hyderabad)
18 August 2020	Amvrosius Parashkevov	78	Bishop	Bulgaria (Silistra)
18 August 2020	Azizur Rahman	76	Politician	Bangladesh (Dhaka)
20 August 2020	Frank Cullotta	81	Mobster and movie consultant	United States (Las Vegas)
20 August 2020	A. Rahman Khan	77	Politician	India
21 August 2020	Ulric Haynes	89	Diplomat	United States
22 August 2020	Ahmed Badouj	70	Actor and film director	Morocco (Agadir)
22 August 2020	John Bangsund	81	Science fiction fan	Australia (Preston)
22 August 2020	Karim Kamalov	66	Politician	Uzbekistan (Tashkent)
22 August 2020	Conny Nxumalo	53	Social worker	South Africa (Pretoria)
23 August 2020	Charles Stuart Bowyer	86	Astronomer and academic	United States (Orinda)
24 August 2020	Sálvio Dino	88	Politician	Brazil (São Luís)
24 August 2020	Touriya Jabrane	67	Actress and politician	Morocco (Casablanca)
24 August 2020	Margot Prior	83	Psychologist	Australia
25 August 2020	Ruhollah Hosseinian	64	Politician	Iran (Tehran)
25 August 2020	Rebeca Guber	94	Mathematician	Argentina (Buenos Aires)
26 August 2020	Oscar Cruz	85	Archbishop	Philippines (San Juan)
26 August 2020	Dirk Mudge	92	Politician	Namibia (Windhoek)
26 August 2020	Douglas MacDiarmid	97	Painter	France (Paris)
27 August 2020	James E. Humphreys	80	Mathematician	United States (Leeds)
27 August 2020	William Neikirk	82	Journalist	United States (Arlington County)
27 August 2020	Masud Yunus	68	Politician	Indonesia (Mojokerto)
27 August 2020	A. R. Lakshmanan	78	Judge	India
27 August 2020	Vejaynand Ramlakan	62	Military officer	South Africa (Johannesburg)
28 August 2020	H. Vasanthakumar	70	Politician	India (Chennai)
29 August 2020	S. I. Padmavati	103	Cardiologist	India (New Delhi)
30 August 2020	Cecilia Romo	74	Actress	Mexico (Mexico City)
30 August 2020	Ricardo Valderrama Fernández	75	Politician and anthropologist	Peru (Cusco)
30 August 2020	Katyayani Shankar Bajpai	92	Diplomat	India
31 August 2020	Pranab Mukherjee	84	Politician	India (New Delhi)
31 August 2020	Tom Seaver	75	Baseball player	United States (Calistoga)
31 August 2020	Pietro Mário	81	Actor	Brazil
31 August 2020	Édouard Karemera	68	Politician	Senegal (Dakar)
2 September 2020	Datta Ekbote	84	Activist	India (Pune)
2 September 2020	M. J. Appaji Gowda	69	Politician	India (Shimoga)
2 September 2020	Rinat Ibragimov	59	Double bassist	United Kingdom (London)
2 September 2020	Agustín Roberto Radrizzani	75	Bishop	Argentina (Junín)
2 September 2020	Vladislav Krapivin	81	Writer	Russia (Yekaterinburg)
3 September 2020	Antônio de Jesus Dias	78	Politician	Brazil (Goiânia)
3 September 2020	Ramón Silva Bahamondes	76	Singer and radio host	Chile (Viña del Mar)
3 September 2020	Bill Pursell	94	Composer	United States (Nashville)
3 September 2020	Ahmed Al-Qadri	64	Politician	Syria (Damascus)
3 September 2020	Nestor Soriano	67	Sailor	Philippines (Antique)
4 September 2020	Lloyd Cadena	26	Vlogger	Philippines (Muntinlupa)
4 September 2020	Joe Williams	85	Politician	New Zealand (Auckland)
5 September 2020	Abu Osman Chowdhury	84	Military officer	Bangladesh (Dhaka)
5 September 2020	Johnny Bakshi	88	Film director and producer	India (Mumbai)
5 September 2020	Smokey Gaines	80	Basketball player and coach	United States (Memphis)
5 September 2020	Jiří Menzel	82	Film director, actor, and screenwriter	Czech Republic (Prague)
5 September 2020	Zelmar Casco	94	Fencer	Argentina
6 September 2020	Sterling Magee	84	Singer	United States (Pinellas Park)
6 September 2020	Bruce Williamson	49	Singer	United States (Las Vegas)
7 September 2020	Aurelio Iragorri Hormaza	83	Politician	Colombia (Bogotá)
7 September 2020	Narendra Kumar Swain	80	Politician	India
8 September 2020	Bernardita Ramos	76	Politician	Philippines (Sorsogon)
9 September 2020	Marcos Montero	55	Television and radio host	Bolivia (Santa Cruz de la Sierra)
9 September 2020	Henrietta Boggs	102	First Lady of Costa Rica	United States (Montgomery)
9 September 2020	Yopie Latul	67	Singer	Indonesia (East Jakarta)
9 September 2020	KS Firoz	74	Actor	Bangladesh (Dhaka)
10 September 2020	Melih Onuş	39	Mathematician	Turkey (Ankara)
10 September 2020	Seth Boois		Football manager	Namibia
11 September 2020	Nadhim Shaker	61	Footballer and manager	Iraq (Erbil)
11 September 2020	Toots Hibbert	77	Singer and guitarist	Jamaica (Kingston)
12 September 2020	Joaquín Carbonell	73	Singer-songwriter, journalist and poet	Spain (Zaragoza)
12 September 2020	Carlos Casamiquela	72	Politician	Argentina (Buenos Aires)
12 September 2020	Mohammed Makhlouf	87	Businessman	Syria (Damascus)
12 September 2020	Azmi Mohamed Megahed	70	Volleyball player	Egypt (Cairo)
13 September 2020	Ajit Das	71	Actor, director, and playwright	India (Bhubaneswar)
13 September 2020	Raghuvansh Prasad Singh	74	Politician	India (New Delhi)
13 September 2020	K. Thangavel	68	Politician	India (Coimbatore)
13 September 2020	Parrerito	67	Singer	Brazil (Belo Horizonte)
14 September 2020	Sadek Bachchu	65	Actor	Bangladesh (Dhaka)
14 September 2020	Florent Pereira	67	Journalist and film actor	India (Chennai)
14 September 2020	Chanesh Ram Rathiya	78	Politician	India (Raigarh)
14 September 2020	Kaukab Quder Meerza	87	Scholar	India (Kolkata)
15 September 2020	Miguel Acundo González	58	Politician	Mexico (Puebla)
15 September 2020	Momčilo Krajišnik	75	Politician and convicted war criminal	Bosnia and Herzegovina (Banja Luka)
15 September 2020	Faith Alupo	36	Politician	Uganda (Kampala)
16 September 2020	P. R. Krishna Kumar	68	Doctor	India (Coimbatore)
16 September 2020	Nick Mourouzis	83	American football player and coach	United States (Greencastle)
16 September 2020	Balli Durga Prasad Rao	64	Politician	India (Chennai)
16 September 2020	Saefullah	56	Politician	Indonesia (Jakarta)
17 September 2020	Donald Keith Duncan	80	Politician	Jamaica (Kingston)
17 September 2020	Ricardo Ciciliano	43	Footballer	Colombia (Barranquilla)
17 September 2020	Ashok Gasti	55	Politician	India (Bangalore)
17 September 2020	Liladhar Vaghela	85	Politician	India (Gandhinagar)
18 September 2020	Asit Bandopadhyay	84	Dramatist, screenwriter, and actor	India (Kolkata)
19 September 2020	David Cook	76	Politician	United Kingdom (Portadown)
20 September 2020	Uktam Barnoev	56	Politician	Germany
20 September 2020	Gerardo Vera	73	Costume and set designer, director, and actor	Spain (Madrid)
21 September 2020	Hamdi Benani	77	Singer and musician	Algeria (Annaba)
21 September 2020	Tommy DeVito	92	Singer and guitarist	United States (Las Vegas)
21 September 2020	Shyama Sharma	70	Politician	India
21 September 2020	AKM Nowsheruzzaman	69	Footballer	Bangladesh (Dhaka)
22 September 2020	Rajendra Devlekar	54	Politician	India (Mumbai)
22 September 2020	Ashutosh Mohunta	67	Politician	India (Mohali)
22 September 2020	Muharram	52	Politician	Indonesia (Balikpapan)
22 September 2020	Gopal Singh Rawat	62	Politician	India (Rishikesh)
22 September 2020	Ashalata Wabgaonkar	79	Actress	India (Satara)
23 September 2020	Vakha Agaev	67	Politician	Russia (Moscow)
23 September 2020	Suresh Angadi	65	Politician	India (New Delhi)
23 September 2020	G. P. Venkidu	85	Politician	India (Coimbatore)
24 September 2020	Sekhar Basu	68	Scientist	India (Kolkata)
24 September 2020	B. Narayan Rao	65	Politician	India (Manipal)
25 September 2020	S. P. Balasubrahmanyam	74	Playback singer, actor and film producer	India (Chennai)
26 September 2020	Abdul Mahdi Hadi	74	Footballer and manager	Iraq (Basra)
26 September 2020	Jay Johnstone	74	Baseball player and commentator	United States (Los Angeles)
26 September 2020	Riyad al-Rayyes	83	Journalist	Lebanon
27 September 2020	Mahbubey Alam	71	Lawyer	Bangladesh (Dhaka)
28 September 2020	Rubén Anguiano	64	Footballer	Mexico (Mexico City)
29 September 2020	Rebecca Cryer	73	Judge	United States (Norman)
29 September 2020	Mamu Ram Gonder	70	Politician	India (Panchkula)
29 September 2020	Mirza Shahi	70	Actor and comedian	Pakistan (Karachi)
29 September 2020	Mesfin Woldemariam	90	Academic	Ethiopia (Addis Ababa)
29 September 2020	Silva Batuta	80	Footballer	Brazil (Rio de Janeiro)
30 September 2020	Ali Bozer	95	Politician	Turkey (Ankara)
30 September 2020	Viktor Nikitin	59	Writer	Russia (Voronezh)
30 September 2020	João Peixoto	75	Politician	Brazil (Campos dos Goytacazes)
1 October 2020	Adi Darma	60	Politician	Indonesia (Bontang)
2 October 2020	Fadma Abi		Surgeon and lecturer	Morocco
3 October 2020	Haji Hussain Ansari	73	Politician	India (Ranchi)
4 October 2020	Giovanni D'Alise	72	Bishop	Italy (Caserta)
4 October 2020	Pradeep Maharathy	65	Politician	India (Bhubaneswar)
4 October 2020	Mordechai Yissachar Ber Leifer	64	Rabbi	Israel (Netanya)
4 October 2020	Ibnu Saleh	58	Politician	Indonesia (Pangkal Pinang)
4 October 2020	Kenzō Takada	81	Fashion designer	France (Neuilly-sur-Seine)
5 October 2020	Rasheed Masood	73	Politician and convicted fraudster	India (Saharanpur)
5 October 2020	David Andahl	55	Politician	United States
6 October 2020	Suleiman Mahmoud	71	Military officer	Libya (Tripoli)
7 October 2020	Kailash Chandra Trivedi	65	Politician	India
8 October 2020	Miguel Giubergia	67	Politician	Argentina (Palpalá)
8 October 2020	Jan Szarek	84	Bishop	Poland (Cieszyn)
8 October 2020	Ali Khalif Galaydh	78	Politician	Ethiopia (Jijiga)
9 October 2020	David Refael ben-Ami	70	Singer	Israel (Jerusalem)
10 October 2020	Amnon Freidberg	75	Entomologist	Israel (Tel Aviv)
10 October 2020	Suresh Gore	55	Politician	India (Pune)
10 October 2020	Priscilla Jana	76	Politician and diplomat	South Africa (Pretoria)
10 October 2020	Vasili Kulkov	54	Footballer	Russia
11 October 2020	Hugo Arana	77	Actor	Argentina (Buenos Aires)
11 October 2020	Mirza Mazharul Islam	93	Doctor	Bangladesh (Dhaka)
12 October 2020	C. M. Chang	78	Politician	India (Kohima)
12 October 2020	Sarat Kumar Kar	81	Politician	India (Bhubaneswar)
12 October 2020	Yehoshua Kenaz	83	Novelist	Israel (Petah Tikva)
12 October 2020	José de Oliveira Fernandes	76	Politician	Brazil (Manaus)
12 October 2020	Akbar Alemi	75	Actor	Iran (Tehran)
14 October 2020	Lance Carson	74	Politician	United States (Minneapolis)
14 October 2020	Fred Dean	68	American football player	United States (Jackson)
15 October 2020	Antonio Ángel Algora Hernando	80	Bishop	Spain (Madrid)
15 October 2020	Danil Khalimov	42	Wrestler	Russia (Yekaterinburg)
15 October 2020	Warren Mitchell	87	Basketball player and coach	United States (Midlothian)
15 October 2020	Alfons Verplaetse	90	Banker	Belgium (Bonheiden)
15 October 2020	P. Vetrivel	60	Politician	India (Chennai)
15 October 2020	Kishore Bhimani	81	Journalist	India
16 October 2020	Pradip Ghosh	78	Elocutionist	India (Kolkata)
16 October 2020	Itzhak Ilan	64	Security agent	Israel (Petah Tikva)
16 October 2020	Kapil Deo Kamat	69	Politician	India (Patna)
16 October 2020	P. S. Narayanaswamy	86	Singer	India
17 October 2020	Pollycarpus Priyanto	59	Convicted murderer	Indonesia (Jakarta)
17 October 2020	Ryszard Ronczewski	90	Actor	Poland (Sopot)
18 October 2020	Stanisław Kogut	66	Politician	Poland (Gorlice)
18 October 2020	Ilana Rovina	86	Singer	Israel (Tel Aviv)
19 October 2020	Jana Andresíková	79	Actress	Czech Republic (Mělník)
19 October 2020	Enzo Mari	88	Designer	Italy (Novara)
20 October 2020	John Condrone	59	Wrestler and singer-songwriter	United States (Maryville)
20 October 2020	Dariusz Gnatowski	59	Actor	Poland (Kraków)
20 October 2020	Lea Vergine	84	Art historian	Italy (Milan)
20 October 2020	Bogdan Józef Wojtuś	83	Bishop	Poland (Poznań)
21 October 2020	Arolde de Oliveira	83	Politician	Brazil (Rio de Janeiro)
21 October 2020	Peter Secchia	83	Diplomat and businessman	United States (East Grand Rapids)
22 October 2020	Nayani Narasimha Reddy	86	Politician	India (Hyderabad)
22 October 2020	Allan Migi	60	Bishop	Papua New Guinea
23 October 2020	Yehuda Barkan	75	Film producer, actor, and screenwriter	Israel (Jerusalem)
24 October 2020	Joel Molina Ramírez	77	Politician	Mexico (Tlaxcala City)
24 October 2020	Pavel Syrchin	62	Weightlifter	Russia (Perm)
25 October 2020	Johnny Leeze	78	Actor	United Kingdom (Grimsby)
25 October 2020	Katalin Korinthus	67	Politician	Hungary
25 October 2020	Ernesto Contreras	83	Cyclist	Argentina (Mendoza)
25 October 2020	Mahesh Kanodia	83	Politician	India (Gandhinagar)
25 October 2020	Jean Matouk	83	Economist and banker	France (Nîmes)
26 October 2020	Csaba Kelemen	65	Actor, stage manager, and politician	Hungary (Miskolc)
26 October 2020	David Bloomberg	88	Politician	South Africa (Cape Town)
27 October 2020	Shaban Bantariza	56–57	Military officer	Uganda (Kampala)
27 October 2020	A. K. M. Mosharraf Hossain	83	Politician	Bangladesh (Dhaka)
27 October 2020	Naresh Kanodia	77	Actor and politician	India (Ahmedabad)
27 October 2020	Daniel Kopál	49	Chef	Czech Republic (České Budějovice)
27 October 2020	Jan Niemiec	62	Bishop	Poland (Łańcut)
28 October 2020	Bobby Ball	76	Comedian	United Kingdom (Blackpool)
28 October 2020	Miguel Ángel Castellini	73	Boxer	Argentina (Buenos Aires)
28 October 2020	Hassan Zare Dehnavi	64	Judge	Iran (Tehran)
28 October 2020	Gurgen Egiazaryan	72	Politician	Armenia (Yerevan)
28 October 2020	Anatoliy Fedorchuk	60	Politician	Ukraine (Boryspil)
28 October 2020	Jan Krawiec	101	Political activist, historian, and journalist	United States (Chicago)
28 October 2020	Mohamed Melehi	83	Painter	France (Boulogne-Billancourt)
28 October 2020	Pino Scaccia	74	Journalist	Italy (Rome)
29 October 2020	Valeriy Babych	67	Politician	Ukraine (Kyiv)
29 October 2020	Sukumar Hansda	63	Politician	India (Kolkata)
29 October 2020	Pablo Lozano	89	Bullfighter and rancher	Spain (Madrid)
29 October 2020	Keshubhai Patel	92	Politician	India (Ahmedabad)
29 October 2020	Felix Malyarenko	69	Writer	Russia
29 October 2020	Karim Akbari Mobarakeh	67	Actor and film director	Iran (Tehran)
29 October 2020	Ulfat Mustafin	61	Politician	Russia (Moscow)
29 October 2020	Yury Ponomaryov	74	Politician	Russia (Petrozavodsk)
29 October 2020	H. Tati Santiesteban	85	Politician	United States (El Paso)
29 October 2020	Alexander Vedernikov	56	Conductor	Russia (Moscow)
29 October 2020	Andrei Kubatin	36	Archaeologist	Uzbekistan (Tashkent)
30 October 2020	Rick Baldwin	67	Baseball player	United States (Modesto)
30 October 2020	Byron Bradfute	82	American football player	United States (New Braunfels)
30 October 2020	Amfilohije Radović	82	Bishop	Montenegro (Podgorica)
30 October 2020	Elnorita Tugung	80	Politician	Philippines (Sorsogon)
30 October 2020	Yusuf Hussain	73	Actor	India
31 October 2020	R. Doraikkannu	72	Politician	India (Chennai)
31 October 2020	Arturo Lona Reyes	94	Bishop	Mexico (Lagunas)
31 October 2020	Barbara Ann Rowan	82	Attorney	United States (Arlington County)
1 November 2020	Hryhoriy Arshynov	59	Civil engineer and activist	Ukraine
1 November 2020	Julio Bécquer	88	Baseball player	United States (Hopkins)
1 November 2020	Burhan Kuzu	65	Politician	Turkey (Istanbul)
1 November 2020	Nikolay Maksyuta	73	Politician	Russia (Moscow)
1 November 2020	Mario Pereyra	77	Radio host	Argentina (Córdoba)
1 November 2020	Anwar Ul Alam Shaheed	73	Diplomat	Bangladesh (Dhaka)
2 November 2020	Roy Edwards	66	Politician	United States (Casper)
2 November 2020	Bhagirathi Majhi	66	Politician	India (Baripada)
2 November 2020	Oscar W. McConkie Jr.	94	Politician	United States (Salt Lake City)
2 November 2020	Satish Prasad Singh	84	Politician	India (Delhi)
2 November 2020	Léo de Almeida Neves	88	Politician	Brazil (São Paulo)
3 November 2020	Irvin Baxter Jr.	75	Preacher	United States (Plano)
3 November 2020	Dharshibhai Khanpura	80	Politician	India (Ahmedabad)
3 November 2020	Václav Zelený	84	Botanist	Czech Republic
4 November 2020	Lalit Bhati	61	Politician	India (Ajmer)
4 November 2020	Lakhdar Bouregaa	87	Independentist militant	Algeria (El Biar)
4 November 2020	Maurice Faivre	94	Military officer	France
4 November 2020	Sead Gološ	51	Architect	Bosnia and Herzegovina (Sarajevo)
4 November 2020	John Meyer	78	American football player	United States (Chicago)
4 November 2020	Moncef Ouannes	63–64	Sociologist	Tunisia (Tunis)
4 November 2020	Roald Tweet	87	Academic	United States (Peoria)
4 November 2020	Jan Vrba	83	Politician	Czech Republic
4 November 2020	Zbigniew Zysk	70	Politician	Poland (Olsztyn)
5 November 2020	Jean-Michel Boris	87	Artistic director	France (Paris)
5 November 2020	Alan Cairns	80	Pastor, author, and broadcaster	United Kingdom (Ballymoney)
5 November 2020	Reynaert	65	Singer	Belgium (Seraing)
5 November 2020	Jacques Glowinski	84	Pharmacist and biology researcher	France (Paris)
5 November 2020	Géza Szőcs	67	Politician and poet	Hungary (Budapest)
5 November 2020	Jean-Pierre Vincent	78	Theatrical actor and director	France (Mallemort)
5 November 2020	Gordon Van Wylen	100	Physicist	United States (Holland)
6 November 2020	Luis Alberto Ammann	77	Journalist	Argentina (Buenos Aires)
6 November 2020	Andrzej Owczarek	70	Politician	Poland (Łódź)
6 November 2020	Sergey Palagin	52	Military pilot and lieutenant colonel	Russia (Krasnodar)
6 November 2020	Jim Radford	92	Activist and singer	United Kingdom (London)
6 November 2020	Fernando Solanas	84	Politician and filmmaker	France (Neuilly-sur-Seine)
6 November 2020	Caprino Alendy	68	Politician	Suriname
6 November 2020	Stefano D'Orazio	72	Musician	Italy (Rome)
7 November 2020	Vasile Gherasim	70	Politician	Romania (Bucharest)
7 November 2020	Anicetus Bongsu Antonius Sinaga	79	Bishop	Indonesia (Medan)
8 November 2020	Víctor Valencia de los Santos	61	Politician	Mexico (Ciudad Juárez)
8 November 2020	Benedito Roberto	74	Archbishop	Angola (Malanje)
8 November 2020	Miro Steržaj	87	Politician	Slovenia (Murska Sobota)
9 November 2020	Marco Santagata	73	Academic and writer	Italy (Pisa)
9 November 2020	Eleanor Schano	88	Journalist	United States (Pittsburgh)
9 November 2020	Shkëlqim Troplini	54	Wrestler	Albania (Durrës)
9 November 2020	M. Narayanan	64	Politician	India
10 November 2020	Saeb Erekat	65	Politician	Israel (Jerusalem)
10 November 2020	Renzo Gattegna	80	Lawyer	Italy (Rome)
10 November 2020	Luis Ibero	71	Politician	Spain (Pamplona)
10 November 2020	Isidro Pedraza Chávez	61	Politician	Mexico (Pachuca)
10 November 2020	Sven Wollter	86	Actor, writer, and political activist	Sweden (Luleå)
10 November 2020	Carlo Bordini	82	Poet	Italy (Rome)
11 November 2020	Mongameli Bobani	52	Politician	South Africa
11 November 2020	Mark Kosmos	75	American football player	Canada (Ottawa)
12 November 2020	William T. Beaver	87	Medical researcher and educator	United States (Leesburg)
12 November 2020	Kanybek Isakov	51	Politician	Kyrgyzstan (Bishkek)
12 November 2020	Surendra Singh Jeena	50	Politician	India (New Delhi)
12 November 2020	Nelly Kaplan	89	Writer	Switzerland (Geneva)
12 November 2020	Lynn Kellogg	77	Singer and actress	United States (St. Louis)
12 November 2020	Leonid Potapov	85	Politician	Russia (Ulan-Ude)
12 November 2020	Arjun Prajapati	63	Pottery artist	India (Jaipur)
12 November 2020	Jerry Rawlings	73	Politician	Ghana (Accra)
12 November 2020	Waqar Ahmed Seth	59	Judge	Pakistan (Islamabad)
12 November 2020	Alan Glazier	81	Darts player	United Kingdom
13 November 2020	Jam Madad Ali Khan	57	Politician	Pakistan (Karachi)
13 November 2020	Peter Sutcliffe	74	Serial killer	United Kingdom (Durham)
13 November 2020	Andrzej Prawda	69	Football manager	Poland
13 November 2020	Attila Horváth	53	Athlete	Hungary (Szombathely)
13 November 2020	Jim Pace	59	Racing driver	United States (Memphis)
13 November 2020	Henry Slaughter	93	Singer-songwriter and pianist	United States (Nashville)
13 November 2020	Philip Voss	84	Actor	United Kingdom (Watford)
13 November 2020	Mohand Chérif Hannachi	70	Footballer	Algeria (Algiers)
13 November 2020	Tshering Dorje	84	Historian	India (Mandi)
14 November 2020	Frederick B. Chary	81	Historian	United States
14 November 2020	János Gróz	49	Handball coach	Hungary
14 November 2020	Abu Hena	81	Politician	Bangladesh (Dhaka)
14 November 2020	Lindy McDaniel	84	Baseball player	United States (Carrollton)
14 November 2020	Hasan Muratović	80	Politician	Bosnia and Herzegovina (Sarajevo)
14 November 2020	Kay Wiestål	80	Footballer and entrepreneur	Sweden
15 November 2020	Chandrawati	92	Politician	India (Rohtak)
15 November 2020	Soumitra Chatterjee	85	Actor	India (Kolkata)
15 November 2020	Henrique Córdova	81	Politician	Brazil (Lages)
15 November 2020	Anto Kovačević	68	Politician	Croatia (Zagreb)
15 November 2020	Leon Claire Metz	90	Historian	United States (El Paso)
15 November 2020	Ioannis Tassias	62	Bishop	Greece (Thessaloniki)
16 November 2020	Eddie Borysewicz	81	Cycling coach	Poland (Drezdenko)
16 November 2020	Ian Finkel	72	Percussionist	United States (New York City)
16 November 2020	Eric Hall	73	Football and music agent	United Kingdom
16 November 2020	Raul del Mar	79	Politician	Philippines (Manila)
16 November 2020	Joe Núñez	84	Politician	United States (Colorado)
17 November 2020	Camille Bonnet	102	Rugby union player	France (Valence)
17 November 2020	Stanisław Dulias	81	Politician	Poland (Mysłowice)
17 November 2020	Willy Kuijpers	83	Politician	Belgium (Leuven)
17 November 2020	Roman Viktyuk	84	Theater director, actor, and screenwriter	Russia (Moscow)
17 November 2020	Manis Muka Mohd Darah	66	Politician	Malaysia (Kota Kinabalu)
18 November 2020	Alexander Dubyanskiy	79	Scholar	Russia (Moscow)
18 November 2020	Michel Robin	90	Actor	France (Rambouillet)
18 November 2020	Juan Roldán	63	Boxer	Argentina (San Francisco, Córdoba)
18 November 2020	Firsat Sofi	42	Politician	Turkey (Ankara)
18 November 2020	Pim Doesburg	77	Footballer	Netherlands (Berkel en Rodenrijs)
19 November 2020	Sebouh Chouldjian	61	Bishop	Armenia (Yerevan)
19 November 2020	Reşit Karabacak	66	Wrestler	Turkey (Bursa)
19 November 2020	Ramsay G. Najjar	68	Businessman and writer	Lebanon (Beirut)
19 November 2020	Manvel Grigoryan	64	Politician	Armenia (Yerevan)
20 November 2020	Tony Gershlick	69	Cardiologist	United Kingdom (Glenfield)
20 November 2020	Fazlul Haque Montu	71	Union leader	Bangladesh (Dhaka)
20 November 2020	Irinej	90	Bishop	Serbia (Belgrade)
20 November 2020	Murman Omanidze	82	Politician	Russia (Saint Petersburg)
20 November 2020	Rita Sargsyan	58	First Lady of Armenia	Armenia (Yerevan)
20 November 2020	Gbenga Aluko	58	Politician	Nigeria (Abuja)
21 November 2020	Donal Leace	81	Singer	United States (Washington)
21 November 2020	Khalil el-Moumni	79	Imam	Morocco (Oujda)
21 November 2020	Artemije Radosavljević	85	Bishop	Serbia (Valjevo)
21 November 2020	Jožef Smej	98	Bishop	Slovenia (Lenart v Slovenskih Goricah)
22 November 2020	Muharrem Fejzo	87	Film director	Albania
22 November 2020	Mncedisi Filtane		Politician	South Africa
22 November 2020	Edgar García	60	Bullfighter	Colombia (Pereira)
22 November 2020	Honestie Hodges	14	Police reformer	United States (Grand Rapids)
22 November 2020	Elena Hrenova	70	Politician	Moldova (Chișinău)
22 November 2020	George Nock	74	American football player	United States (Snellville)
22 November 2020	Jerrold Post	86	Psychiatrist and author	United States (Bethesda)
22 November 2020	Pedro Ávila Nevárez	83	Politician	Mexico (Durango City)
22 November 2020	Noëlla Rouget	100	Teacher	Switzerland (Geneva)
22 November 2020	Gonzalo Galván Castillo	69	Bishop	Mexico
22 November 2020	Badal Roy	63	Footballer	Bangladesh
22 November 2020	Bashkim Kopliku	77	Politician	Albania
23 November 2020	Dorothy Gill Barnes	93	Artist	United States (Columbus)
23 November 2020	Vinicio Bernardini	94	Politician	Italy (Pisa)
23 November 2020	Admir Džubur	56	Businessman and football administrator	Bosnia and Herzegovina (Sarajevo)
23 November 2020	Marco Virgilio Ferrari	87	Bishop	Italy (Cassano Magnago)
23 November 2020	Tarun Gogoi	84	Politician	India (Guwahati)
23 November 2020	Nikola Spasov	61	Footballer and manager	Bulgaria (Montana)
23 November 2020	Viktor Zimin	58	Politician	Russia (Moscow)
23 November 2020	Tamás Böröndi	65	Actor and theater manager	Hungary (Budapest)
24 November 2020	João Alves Filho	79	Politician	Brazil (Brasília)
24 November 2020	Juan de Dios Castro Lozano	78	Politician	Mexico (Lerdo)
24 November 2020	Khalif Isse Mudan	67	Politician	Turkey (Ankara)
24 November 2020	Yves Vander Cruysen	57	Historian and political activist	Belgium (Waterloo)
24 November 2020	Erik Galimov	84	Geochemist	Russia
24 November 2020	Kambuzia Partovi	65	Film director and screenwriter	Iran (Tehran)
24 November 2020	Fred Sasakamoose	86	Ice hockey player	Canada (Prince Albert)
24 November 2020	Hussein Al-Zuhairi		Politician	Lebanon
24 November 2020	Damián Iguacén Borau	104	Bishop	Spain (Huesca)
25 November 2020	Marc-André Bédard	85	Politician	Canada (Saguenay)
25 November 2020	Marcello Brunelli	81	Neurophysiologist and academic	Italy (Pisa)
25 November 2020	Muhammad Jadam Mangrio	63	Politician	Pakistan (Karachi)
25 November 2020	Salid Mustafa	50	Politician	Kenya
25 November 2020	José Manuel Mireles Valverde	62	Doctor	Mexico (Morelia)
25 November 2020	Ahmed Patel	71	Politician	India (Bharuch)
26 November 2020	Fecó Balázs	69	Singer and composer	Hungary (Budapest)
26 November 2020	George H. Carley	82	Judge	United States (Atlanta)
26 November 2020	Alfonso Milián Sorribas	81	Bishop	Spain (Zaragoza)
26 November 2020	Balfre Vargas Cortez	61	Politician	Mexico (Mexico City)
26 November 2020	Cecilia Fusco	87	Singer	Italy (Latisana)
26 November 2020	Vladimir Ivanov	65	Athlete	Bulgaria (Sofia)
26 November 2020	Sadiq al-Mahdi	84	Politician	United Arab Emirates (Abu Dhabi)
26 November 2020	Hafez Abu Seada	55	Politician	Egypt (Cairo)
26 November 2020	Mridula Sinha	77	Politician	India (Delhi)
26 November 2020	Nur Supriyanto	55	Politician	Indonesia (Bekasi)
26 November 2020	Kamen Tchanev	56	Singer	Bulgaria (Stara Zagora)
26 November 2020	Dadang Wigiarto	53	Politician	Indonesia
26 November 2020	Allan Botschinsky	80	Composer	Denmark
26 November 2020	Benjamín Jiménez Hernández	82	Bishop	Mexico
27 November 2020	Gene Fraise	88	Politician	United States (West Burlington)
27 November 2020	Parviz Poorhosseini	79	Actor	Iran (Tehran)
27 November 2020	Aly Zaker	76	Businessman, writer, actor, and director	Bangladesh (Dhaka)
28 November 2020	Lon Adams	95	Food scientist	United States (Raleigh)
28 November 2020	Bharat Bhalke	60	Politician	India
28 November 2020	Shahadat Hossain Khan	62	Sarod player	Bangladesh (Dhaka)
28 November 2020	Roberto Leitão	83	Martial artist	Brazil (Rio de Janeiro)
28 November 2020	Tyler C. Lockett	87	Judge	United States (Topeka)
28 November 2020	Jean-Louis Servan-Schreiber	83	Journalist	France (Neuilly-sur-Seine)
28 November 2020	Bonifácio Piccinini	91	Archbishop	Brazil (Cuiabá)
29 November 2020	Miša Aleksić	67	Bassist	Serbia (Belgrade)
29 November 2020	Ben Bova	88	Writer	United States (Naples)
29 November 2020	Marco Dino Brogi	88	Bishop	Italy (Florence)
29 November 2020	Vladimir Fortov	74	Scientist	Russia (Moscow)
29 November 2020	Ernesto Galli	75	Footballer and coach	Italy (Vicenza)
29 November 2020	Nelly Sfeir Gonzalez	90	Librarian and bibliographer	United States (Urbana)
29 November 2020	Nedal Abu Tabaq	49	Imam and doctor	Poland (Lublin)
29 November 2020	Ayhan Ulubelen	89	Analytical chemist	Turkey
29 November 2020	Richard C. West	76	Scholar	United States (Madison)
30 November 2020	Irina Antonova	98	Art historian	Russia (Moscow)
30 November 2020	Hella Brock	101	Teacher and musicologist	Germany (Dippoldiswalde)
30 November 2020	Liliane Juchli	87	Nurse and author	Switzerland (Bern)
30 November 2020	Kiran Maheshwari	59	Politician	India (Gurgaon)
30 November 2020	Muhammad Adil Siddiqui	57	Politician	Pakistan (Karachi)
1 December 2020	Hasna Begum	85	Philosopher	Bangladesh (Dhaka)
1 December 2020	Abhay Bharadwaj	66	Politician	India (Chennai)
1 December 2020	Nomula Narsimhaiah	64	Politician	India (Hyderabad)
1 December 2020	Timoteo Ofrasio	72	Jesuit priest and liturgist	Philippines (San Pablo)
1 December 2020	Arnie Robinson	72	Athlete	United States (San Diego)
1 December 2020	Hanna Stadnik	91	Social worker	Poland (Warsaw)
1 December 2020	Sol Tolchinsky	91	Basketball player	Canada (Montreal)
1 December 2020	Jean-Pierre Lola Kisanga	51	Politician	Democratic Republic of the Congo (Kinshasa)
2 December 2020	Valéry Giscard d'Estaing	94	Politician	France (Authon)
2 December 2020	Franco Giraldi	89	Director and screenwriter	Italy (Trieste)
2 December 2020	Alfred Kucharczyk	83	Gymnast	Poland
2 December 2020	Aldo Moser	86	Racing cyclist	Italy (Trento)
2 December 2020	Boris Plotnikov	71	Actor	Russia (Moscow)
2 December 2020	Karim Salman	55	Footballer and coach	Iraq (Baghdad)
3 December 2020	Dadang Hawari	80	Psychiatrist	Indonesia (Jakarta)
3 December 2020	Adil Ismayilov	63	Lawyer, jurist, and investigator	Azerbaijan (Baku)
3 December 2020	Ron Mathewson	76	Bassist	United Kingdom (London)
3 December 2020	Dharampal Gulati	97	Businessman	India (New Delhi)
3 December 2020	Maria Fyfe	82	Politician	United Kingdom (Glasgow)
4 December 2020	Peter DiFronzo	87	Mobster	United States (North Barrington)
4 December 2020	Larry Dixon	78	Politician	United States (Montgomery)
4 December 2020	Bassam Saba	62	Flautist	Lebanon (Beirut)
4 December 2020	Huba Rozsnyai	77	Athlete	Hungary (Budapest)
4 December 2020	Suhaila Siddiq	71	Politician	Afghanistan (Kabul)
4 December 2020	Ferenc Tóth	69	Politician	Hungary (Szekszárd)
4 December 2020	Dineshwar Sharma	66	Civil servant	India
4 December 2020	Alexander Mikhailov	69	Politician	Russia
4 December 2020	Arshad Malik	76	Judge	Pakistan
5 December 2020	Anusuya Prasad Maikhuri	59	Politician	India
5 December 2020	Henryk Kukier	90	Boxer	Poland
5 December 2020	Martin Sandoval	56	Politician	United States (Maywood)
5 December 2020	Suhail Zaheer Lari	84	Author	Pakistan (Karachi)
6 December 2020	Jairo Castillo	31	Baseball player and scout	Dominican Republic
6 December 2020	Muslihan DS	74	Politician	Indonesia (Bengkulu)
6 December 2020	Jacques Puisais	93	Oenologist	France (Saint-Benoît-la-Forêt)
6 December 2020	Ali-Asghar Zarei	63	Politician	Iran (Tehran)
6 December 2020	Dejan Dabović	76	Water polo player	Serbia (Belgrade)
7 December 2020	İrfan Gürpınar	77	Politician	Turkey (Ankara)
7 December 2020	Divya Bhatnagar	34	Actress	India (Mumbai)
7 December 2020	Phyllis Eisenstein	74	Author	United States (Chicago)
7 December 2020	Walter Hooper	89	Literary editor	United Kingdom (Oxford)
7 December 2020	Dawn Lindberg	75	Singer, actress, theater producer, and director	South Africa (Plettenberg Bay)
7 December 2020	Pumza Dyantyi	72	Politician	South Africa
7 December 2020	Lidia Menapace	96	Politician	Italy (Bolzano)
7 December 2020	Janusz Sanocki	66	Politician	Poland (Kędzierzyn-Koźle)
7 December 2020	Ildegarda Taffra	86	Skier	Italy (Trieste)
7 December 2020	Tasiman		Politician	Indonesia (Pati)
7 December 2020	Eduardo Galvão	58	Actor	Brazil (Rio de Janeiro)
7 December 2020	Akram Ahmed	58	Military officer	Bangladesh (Dhaka)
8 December 2020	Gladys Beckwith	91	Lecturer	United States (Lansing)
8 December 2020	Harold Budd	84	Composer and poet	United States (Arcadia)
8 December 2020	Tony Curcillo	89	American football and Canadian football player	United States (Riverside)
8 December 2020	Aslanbek Fidarov	47	Wrestler	Russia (Vladikavkaz)
8 December 2020	Lay Nam Chang	77	Theoretical physicist	United States (Virginia)
8 December 2020	Wang Yupu	64	Politician	China (Tianjin)
8 December 2020	Yevgeny Shaposhnikov	78	Politician	Russia (Moscow)
8 December 2020	Kurt Stettler	88	Footballer	Switzerland (Zurich)
8 December 2020	Sudjati	66	Politician	Indonesia (Tanjung Selor)
8 December 2020	Siraj Kassam Teli	67	Businessman	United Arab Emirates (Dubai)
9 December 2020	Malkan Amin	72	Politician	Indonesia (Makassar)
9 December 2020	Osvaldo Cochrane Filho	87	Water polo player	Brazil (Rio de Janeiro)
9 December 2020	Manglesh Dabral	72	Poet	India (New Delhi)
9 December 2020	Gordon Forbes	86	Tennis player	South Africa (Plettenberg Bay)
9 December 2020	Dick Hinch	71	Politician	United States (Merrimack)
9 December 2020	Vyacheslav Kebich	84	Politician	Belarus (Minsk)
9 December 2020	Marc Meneau	77	Chef	France (Auxerre)
9 December 2020	Chowdhury Kamal Ibne Yusuf	80	Politician	Bangladesh (Dhaka)
9 December 2020	Sebastian Radu	49	Politician	Romania
10 December 2020	Maroof Afzal		Politician	Pakistan (Rawalpindi)
10 December 2020	Dudu Duswara	69	Judge	Indonesia (Bandung)
10 December 2020	Severiano Mário Porto	90	Architect	Brazil (Niterói)
10 December 2020	Rita Martinez	65	Chicana activist	United States (Pueblo)
10 December 2020	Ram Lal Rahi	86	Politician	India (Sitapur)
10 December 2020	Carol Sutton	76	Actress	United States (New Orleans)
10 December 2020	Hasu Yajnik	82	Writer	India (Ahmedabad)
10 December 2020	Rahnaward Zaryab	76	Novelist	Afghanistan (Kabul)
10 December 2020	José Mario Ruiz Navas	90	Archbishop	Ecuador
11 December 2020	Farid Abraão David	76	Politician	Brazil (Rio de Janeiro)
11 December 2020	Đurđa Ivezić	84	Actress	Croatia (Zagreb)
11 December 2020	Kim Ki-duk	59	Film director	Latvia (Riga)
11 December 2020	Joseph Nyagah	72	Politician	Kenya (Nairobi)
11 December 2020	Lev Shcheglov	74	Physician	Russia (Saint Petersburg)
11 December 2020	Irena Veisaitė	92	Theater scholar and activist	Lithuania (Vilnius)
11 December 2020	Boniface Kabaka	54	Politician	Kenya (Nairobi)
11 December 2020	Sam Nda-Isaiah	58	Journalist	Nigeria (Abuja)
12 December 2020	Damir Kukuruzović	45	Guitarist	Croatia (Zagreb)
12 December 2020	Charley Pride	86	Singer and baseball player	United States (Dallas)
12 December 2020	Ferruccio Pisoni	84	Politician	Italy
12 December 2020	Fikre Selassie Wogderess	75	Politician	Ethiopia
13 December 2020	Otto Barić	87	Footballer and manager	Croatia (Zagreb)
13 December 2020	Carlos Eduardo Cadoca	80	Politician	Brazil (Recife)
13 December 2020	Ambrose Mandvulo Dlamini	52	Politician	South Africa (Johannesburg)
13 December 2020	Yevgeny Khoroshevtsev	77	Actor	Russia (Moscow)
13 December 2020	Pierre Lacroix	72	Businessman	United States (Las Vegas)
13 December 2020	Jaroslav Mostecký	57	Science fiction writer	Czech Republic
13 December 2020	Rose Ochi	81	Attorney and civil rights activist	United States (Los Angeles)
13 December 2020	Sal Rocca	74	Politician	United States (Troy)
14 December 2020	Elbrus Abbasov	69–70	Footballer	Azerbaijan (Baku)
14 December 2020	Herman Asaribab	56	Military officer	Indonesia (Jakarta)
14 December 2020	Richard Laird	81	Politician	United States (Carrollton)
14 December 2020	Piotr Machalica	65	Actor	Poland (Warsaw)
14 December 2020	Janos Mohoss	84	Fencer	Hungary (Budapest)
14 December 2020	Jack Page	70	Politician	United States (Gadsden)
14 December 2020	Paulo César dos Santos	68	Singer and percussionist	Brazil (Rio de Janeiro)
14 December 2020	José María de la Torre Martín	68	Bishop	Mexico (Aguascalientes City)
14 December 2020	Marcelo Veiga	56	Footballer and manager	Brazil (Bragança Paulista)
15 December 2020	Anthony Casso	78	Mobster	United States (Tucson)
15 December 2020	Orlando Duarte	88	Sports journalist and commentator	Brazil (São Paulo)
15 December 2020	Donald Fowler	85	Political operative	United States (Columbia)
15 December 2020	Paul Nihill	81	Race walker	United Kingdom (Gillingham)
15 December 2020	Zoltan Sabo	48	Footballer	Serbia (Sremska Kamenica)
15 December 2020	Noureddine Saïl	73	Film critic and writer	Morocco (Casablanca)
15 December 2020	D. Vijayamohan	65	Journalist, editor, and writer	India (New Delhi)
16 December 2020	Flavio Cotti	81	Politician	Switzerland (Locarno)
16 December 2020	Steve Ingle	74	Footballer	South Africa
16 December 2020	Yaakov Agmon	91	Theater Producer	Israel (Ramat Gan)
16 December 2020	Leticia Lee	56	Activist	Hong Kong
16 December 2020	Carl Mann	78	Rockabilly singer	United States (Jackson)
16 December 2020	Renê Weber	59	Footballer and manager	Brazil (Rio de Janeiro)
16 December 2020	Tesfaye Gessesse	83	Actor	Ethiopia (Addis Ababa)
17 December 2020	Donato Bilancia	69	Serial killer	Italy (Padua)
17 December 2020	Pierre Buyoya	71	Politician	France (Bonneuil-en-France)
17 December 2020	Kim Chernin	80	Feminist writer	United States (Point Reyes Station)
17 December 2020	Maciej Grubski	52	Politician	Poland (Łódź)
17 December 2020	Arnold D. Gruys	92	Politician	United States (St. Cloud)
17 December 2020	Valentin Kasabov	62	Politician	Bulgaria (Sofia)
17 December 2020	Hennadiy Kernes	61	Politician	Germany (Berlin)
17 December 2020	Tuncay Mataracı	85	Politician	Turkey (Istanbul)
17 December 2020	Benny Napoleon	65	Attorney, law enforcement officer, and politician	United States (Detroit)
17 December 2020	Christina Rodrigues	57	Actress	Brazil (Rio de Janeiro)
17 December 2020	Giovanni Sacco	77	Footballer	Italy (Asti)
17 December 2020	Satya Deo Singh	75	Politician	India (Gurgaon)
17 December 2020	Bolivia Suárez	63	Politician	Venezuela
18 December 2020	Bill Bullard Jr.	77	Politician	United States (Commerce Township)
18 December 2020	Joan Dougherty	93	Politician	Canada (Westmount)
18 December 2020	Eddie Lee Jackson	71	Politician	United States (East St. Louis)
18 December 2020	Aminul Islam Mintu	81	Film editor	Bangladesh (Dhaka)
18 December 2020	Peter M. Neumann	79	Mathematician	United Kingdom (Oxford)
18 December 2020	Kim Lee	56	Drag queen	Poland (Warsaw)
18 December 2020	John Obiero Nyagarama	74	Politician	Kenya (Nairobi)
18 December 2020	Jerry Relph	76	Politician	United States (St. Cloud)
18 December 2020	Robina Sentongo		Politician	Uganda
18 December 2020	Valentin Shurchanov	73	Politician	Russia (Moscow)
19 December 2020	Peter Boddington	78	Boxer	United Kingdom (Coventry)
19 December 2020	Mile Bogović	81	Bishop	Croatia (Rijeka)
19 December 2020	Kirunda Kivejinja	85	Politician	Uganda (Kampala)
19 December 2020	Marjan Lazovski	58	Basketball player and coach	North Macedonia (Skopje)
19 December 2020	Leo Panitch	75	Political philosopher	Canada (Toronto)
19 December 2020	Maria Piątkowska	89	Sprinter, hurdler, and long jumper	Poland (Warsaw)
19 December 2020	Elaine Stack	89	Judge	United States (Manhasset)
19 December 2020	Themie Thomai	75	Politician	Albania (Tirana)
19 December 2020	Bram van der Vlugt	86	Actor	Netherlands (Zegveld)
20 December 2020	Samsuddin Ahmed	75	Politician	Bangladesh (Dhaka)
20 December 2020	Monzur-I-Mowla	80	Poet	Bangladesh (Dhaka)
20 December 2020	Nicette Bruno	87	Actress	Brazil (Rio de Janeiro)
20 December 2020	Delfino López Aparicio	60	Politician	Mexico
20 December 2020	Susan Moore	52	Physician	United States (Carmel)
20 December 2020	Julius Schachter	84	Microbiologist	United States (San Francisco)
20 December 2020	Florencio Olvera Ochoa	87	Bishop	Mexico
21 December 2020	Mark Appelbaum	79	Psychologist	United States (San Diego)
21 December 2020	Ikenwoli Godfrey Emiko	65	King of Warri	Nigeria
21 December 2020	Gilberto Ensástiga	57	Politician	Mexico
21 December 2020	K. T. Oslin	78	Singer-songwriter	United States (Nashville)
21 December 2020	Kalsoom Perveen	75	Politician	Pakistan (Islamabad)
21 December 2020	Motilal Vora	92	Politician	India (New Delhi)
22 December 2020	Wojciech Borowik	64	Politician	Poland
22 December 2020	Edmund M. Clarke	75	Computer scientist	United States (Pittsburgh)
22 December 2020	Leo Goodman	92	Statistician	United States (Berkeley)
22 December 2020	Bonnie Ladwig	81	Politician	United States (Lake Placid)
22 December 2020	Ron Lurie	79	Politician and businessman	United States (Las Vegas)
22 December 2020	Muhammad Mustafa Mero	79	Politician	Syria (Al-Tall)
22 December 2020	Rubén Tierrablanca Gonzalez	68	Bishop	Turkey (Istanbul)
22 December 2020	Paul Loridant	72	Politician	France (Villejuif)
23 December 2020	Irani Barbosa	70	Politician	Brazil (Belo Horizonte)
23 December 2020	Issaka Assane Karanta	75	Politician	Niger (Niamey)
23 December 2020	Loyiso Mpumlwana		Politician	South Africa
23 December 2020	Mićo Mićić	64	Politician	Bosnia and Herzegovina (Banja Luka)
23 December 2020	Sugathakumari	86	Poet and activist	India (Thiruvananthapuram)
23 December 2020	Madan Lal Sharma	68	Politician	India
24 December 2020	Benedicto Bravo	58	Footballer and coach	Mexico (León)
24 December 2020	M. A. Hashem	77	Politician and businessman	Bangladesh (Dhaka)
24 December 2020	AKM Jahangir Hossain	66	Politician	Bangladesh (Dhaka)
24 December 2020	B. J. Marsh	80	Politician	United States (Springfield)
24 December 2020	Vincent Mhlanga		Politician	Eswatini
24 December 2020	Adramé Ndiaye	62	Basketball player	France (Lyon)
24 December 2020	Armando Romero	60	Footballer	Mexico
24 December 2020	Pir Noor Muhammad Shah Jeelani	69	Politician	Pakistan (Karachi)
24 December 2020	Guy N. Smith	81	Author	United Kingdom
24 December 2020	Idongesit Nkanga	69	Politician and military officer	Nigeria
24 December 2020	Mouloud Achour	76	Writer	Algeria
24 December 2020	Geoff Stephens	86	Record producer	United Kingdom
24 December 2020	William Magee	81	Politician	United States
25 December 2020	Milka Babović	92	Athlete and journalist	Croatia (Zagreb)
25 December 2020	Soumaïla Cissé	71	Politician	France (Neuilly-sur-Seine)
25 December 2020	Djalma Bastos de Morais	83	Politician	Brazil (Rio de Janeiro)
25 December 2020	Reginald Foster	81	Priest and Latin scholar	United States (Milwaukee)
25 December 2020	Robin Jackman	75	Cricketer	South Africa (Cape Town)
25 December 2020	Carlos Levy	78	Poet	Argentina (Mendoza)
25 December 2020	Shamsur Rahman Faruqi	85	Poet and literary critic	India (Allahabad)
25 December 2020	Arne Skotte	70	Footballer	Sweden
26 December 2020	Bronisława Kowalska	65	Politician	Poland (Kielce)
26 December 2020	Theodore Lumpkin	100	Military officer, social worker, and businessman	United States (Los Angeles)
26 December 2020	Aubrey Mokoape	76	Anti-apartheid activist	South Africa (Durban)
26 December 2020	Nomvuzo Shabalala	60	Politician	South Africa
26 December 2020	Vic Stelly	79	Politician	United States (Lake Charles)
26 December 2020	Abdul Kader	69	Actor	Bangladesh (Dhaka)
27 December 2020	Telar Ring Deng	62	Politician	South Sudan (Juba)
27 December 2020	Alberto Amador Leal	69	Politician	Mexico
27 December 2020	Florentino Domínguez Ordóñez	58	Politician	Mexico
27 December 2020	Yuichiro Hata	53	Politician	Japan (Tokyo)
27 December 2020	Mohamed El Ouafa	72	Politician	Morocco (Rabat)
27 December 2020	Saidu Kumo	61	Politician	Nigeria
27 December 2020	Mieczysław Morański	60	Actor and voice actor	Poland
27 December 2020	Gunga Mwinga		Politician	Kenya
27 December 2020	Osvaldo Rivera Cianchini	80	Judge	Puerto Rico (San Juan)
27 December 2020	Sunil Kothari	87	Dancer	India
27 December 2020	Ladislav Mrkvička	81	Actor	Czech Republic (Prague)
27 December 2020	Antonio Velasco Piña	85	Writer	Mexico (Mexico City)
28 December 2020	John R. Bentson	83	Neuroradiologist	United States (Los Angeles)
28 December 2020	Romell Broom	64	Convicted murderer	United States (Columbus)
28 December 2020	Othón Cuevas Córdova	55	Politician	Mexico
28 December 2020	Luis Enrique Mercado	68	Politician	Mexico (Mexico City)
28 December 2020	Fou Ts'ong	86	Pianist	United Kingdom (London)
28 December 2020	Armando Manzanero	85	Singer-songwriter, actor, and music producer	Mexico (Mexico City)
28 December 2020	Nolan Mettetal	75	Politician	United States (Oxford)
28 December 2020	Arianna W. Rosenbluth	93	Physicist	United States (Pasadena)
29 December 2020	Luke Letlow	41	Politician	United States (Shreveport)
29 December 2020	Hugh X. Lewis	90	Country singer	United States (Nashville)
29 December 2020	Miguel Ángel Gutiérrez Machado	60	Politician	Mexico (Mérida)
29 December 2020	Michael Julien	93	Songwriter	United Kingdom
29 December 2020	Nikhil Nandy	88	Footballer	India (Nagerbazar)
29 December 2020	Corrado Olmi	94	Actor	Italy (Rome)
29 December 2020	Daniel S. Paletko	70	Politician	United States (Dearborn Heights)
29 December 2020	Serafim Papakostas	61	Bishop	Greece (Thessaloniki)
29 December 2020	Luigi Snozzi	88	Architect	Switzerland (Minusio)
29 December 2020	Simo Mfayela		Politician	South Africa
29 December 2020	Sofia Zhukova	80–81	Convicted murderer	Russia (Khabarovsk)
30 December 2020	Aldo Andretti	80	Racing driver	United States (Indianapolis)
30 December 2020	Lois Sasson	80	Jewelry designer and gay rights activist	United States (New York City)
30 December 2020	Gennady Strakhov	76	Freestyle wrestler	Russia (Moscow)
30 December 2020	Dawn Wells	82	Actress	United States (Los Angeles)
31 December 2020	Paul Etiang	82	Politician	Uganda (Kampala)
31 December 2020	Robert Hossein	93	Film actor, director, and writer	France (Essey-lès-Nancy)
31 December 2020	Muladi	77	Politician	Indonesia (Jakarta)
31 December 2020	Irani	44	Footballer	Brazil (Recife)
1 January 2021	Abdul Hakim Al-Taher	71	Director and actor	Sudan
1 January 2021	Ben Chafin	60	Politician	United States (Richmond)
1 January 2021	Zoran Džorlev	53	Violinist	North Macedonia (Skopje)
1 January 2021	Carlos Escudé	72	Political scientist and author	Argentina (Buenos Aires)
1 January 2021	Abderrahim Lahjouji	79	Businessman and politician	Morocco
1 January 2021	Muspandi	45	Politician	Indonesia (Samarinda)
1 January 2021	Jean Panisse	92	Actor	France (Marseille)
1 January 2021	Paatje Phefferkorn	98	Martial artist	Netherlands (Bussum)
1 January 2021	Toabur Rahim	70	Politician	United Kingdom (London)
1 January 2021	George Whitmore	89	Mountaineer and conservationist	United States (Fresno)
2 January 2021	Tasso Adamopoulos	76	Violist	France (Paris)
2 January 2021	Cléber Eduardo Arado	48	Footballer	Brazil (Curitiba)
2 January 2021	Bahrum Daido	56	Politician	Indonesia (Jakarta)
2 January 2021	Oleg Danilov	71	Playwright and screenwriter	Belarus (Minsk)
2 January 2021	Vladimir Korenev	80	Actor and teacher	Russia (Moscow)
2 January 2021	Aylin Özmenek	78	Animator	Turkey (Ankara)
2 January 2021	Marek Pivovar	56	Writer and theater director	Czech Republic (Ostrava)
2 January 2021	Subiakto Tjakrawerdaya	76	Politician	Indonesia (Jakarta)
2 January 2021	Mike Reese	42	Politician	United States (Greensburg)
2 January 2021	Johannes Wallmann	90	Theologian	Germany (Berlin)
3 January 2021	Oyewusi Ibidapo-Obe	71	Professor	Nigeria (Lagos)
3 January 2021	Shani Mahadevappa	88	Actor	India (Bengaluru)
3 January 2021	Anil Panachooran	51	Lyricist and poet	India (Thiruvananthapuram)
3 January 2021	Donald Perry Polsky	92	Architect	United States (Berkeley)
3 January 2021	Ali Taher	59	Politician	Indonesia (Jakarta)
3 January 2021	Ricardo Akinobu Yamauti	71	Politician	Brazil (Praia Grande)
4 January 2021	Elias Rahbani	82	Composer	Lebanon (Beirut)
4 January 2021	Bernard P. Randolph	87	Military general	United States (San Antonio)
4 January 2021	Barbara Shelley	88	Actress	United Kingdom (London)
4 January 2021	Bambang Suryadi	52	Politician	Indonesia (Jakarta)
5 January 2021	Bonifácio José Tamm de Andrada	90	Politician	Brazil (Belo Horizonte)
5 January 2021	Mluleki George	72	Politician	South Africa (East London)
5 January 2021	John Richardson	86	Actor	United Kingdom
5 January 2021	Thelma Shoher Baker	96	Educator and anthropologist	United States (Chapel Hill)
5 January 2021	Jim Sperry	90	Politician	United States (Aberdeen)
5 January 2021	Vladimir Gerdt	73	Mathematician	Russia (Dubna)
5 January 2021	Moncer Rouissi	80	Politician	Tunisia (Tunis)
6 January 2021	Kenneth Z. Altshuler	91	Psychiatrist	United States (Dallas)
6 January 2021	Mihai Cotorobai	69	Politician	Moldova
6 January 2021	James Cross	99	Diplomat	United Kingdom (Seaford)
6 January 2021	Edward Gnat	80	Politician	Poland (Łódź)
6 January 2021	Danilo Lim	65	Civil servant	Philippines (Manila)
6 January 2021	Victor Thulare III	40	King of the Pedi people	South Africa (Johannesburg)
6 January 2021	Mircea Bolba	59	Footballer	Romania (Satu Mare)
6 January 2021	Burt Wilson	87	Philosopher, writer, and jazz musician	United States (New Berlin)
7 January 2021	Leonid Bujor	65	Politician	Moldova (Chișinău)
7 January 2021	Wilberforce Kisamba Mugerwa	75	Politician	Uganda (Kampala)
7 January 2021	Genival Lacerda	89	Singer	Brazil (Recife)
7 January 2021	Munira Yamin Satti	65	Politician	Pakistan (Rawalpindi)
7 January 2021	Reynaldo Umali	63	Politician	Philippines (Taguig)
8 January 2021	Cástor Oswaldo Azuaje Pérez	69	Bishop	Venezuela (Valera)
8 January 2021	Steve Carver	75	Film director, producer, and photographer	United States (Los Angeles)
8 January 2021	Marissa Garrido	94	Playwright and writer	Mexico (Mexico City)
8 January 2021	Steve Lightle	61	Comic book artist	United States (Kansas City)
8 January 2021	Jay W. McGee	70	Rapper	United States (Flint)
8 January 2021	Iancu Țucărman	98	Agricultural engineer and holocaust survivor	Romania (Bucharest)
8 January 2021	Katharine Whitehorn	92	Journalist	United Kingdom (London)
8 January 2021	Folabi Olumide	84	Academic	Nigeria
9 January 2021	František Filip	90	Film and television director	Czech Republic (Prague)
9 January 2021	John Lutz	81	Writer	United States (Chesterfield)
9 January 2021	Johnson Mlambo	80	Political activist	South Africa
9 January 2021	Anatolii Mokrousov	77	Politician	Ukraine
9 January 2021	George Robertson	93	Ice hockey player	Canada (Winnipeg)
9 January 2021	Fabrizio Soccorsi	78	Doctor	Italy (Rome)
10 January 2021	Hubert Auriol	68	Rally driver	France (Garches)
10 January 2021	Aminu Isa Kontagora	64	Politician	Nigeria
10 January 2021	Geraldo Antônio Miotto	65	Military officer	Brazil (Porto Alegre)
10 January 2021	Nancy Walker Bush Ellis	94	Philanthropist and political campaigner	United States (Concord)
10 January 2021	Adam Dyczkowski	88	Bishop and philosopher	Poland (Zielona Góra)
10 January 2021	Bruno Ghedina	77	Ice hockey player	Italy (Belluno)
10 January 2021	Dee Rowe	91	Basketball coach	United States (Storrs)
10 January 2021	Antonio Sabàto Sr.	77	Actor	United States (Hemet)
10 January 2021	David Stypka	41	Singer-songwriter and guitarist	Czech Republic
10 January 2021	Thorleif Torstensson	71	Singer	Sweden (Halmstad)
11 January 2021	Massoud Achkar	64	Politician	Lebanon (Beirut)
11 January 2021	Eve Branson	96	Philanthropist and child welfare advocate	United Kingdom
11 January 2021	Étienne Draber	81	Actor	France (Paris)
11 January 2021	Fabio Enzo	74	Footballer	Italy (San Donà di Piave)
11 January 2021	Paul Kölliker	88	Rower	Switzerland (Adligenswil)
11 January 2021	Francis Perekamoya	63	Economist	Malawi
11 January 2021	Luis Adriano Piedrahíta Sandoval	74	Bishop	Colombia (Bogotá)
11 January 2021	Oscar Rizzato	91	Bishop	Italy (Padua)
11 January 2021	Ganesh Shankar Vidyarthi	96	Politician	India (Patna)
11 January 2021	Howard Teten	88	FBI agent	United States
11 January 2021	Mario Masuku	70	Politician	Eswatini
11 January 2021	Lindiwe Ndlovu	44	Actress	South Africa (Soweto)
12 January 2021	Lingson Belekanyama		Politician	Malawi
12 January 2021	Bruce Bennett	77	Canadian football player	United States (Ocala)
12 January 2021	Florentin Crihălmeanu	61	Bishop	Romania (Cluj-Napoca)
12 January 2021	Tim Lester	52	American football player	United States (Milton)
12 January 2021	Fred Levin	83	Lawyer	United States (Pensacola)
12 January 2021	Shingoose	74	Singer	Canada (Winnipeg)
12 January 2021	João Henrique de Souza	78	Politician	Brazil (São Paulo)
12 January 2021	Sidik Mia	55	Politician	Malawi
12 January 2021	Philaret	85	Bishop	Belarus (Minsk)
12 January 2021	Bridget Rowe	70	Journalist and editor	United Kingdom (Farnborough)
12 January 2021	Frank Arok	88	Footballer and coach	Serbia (Subotica)
13 January 2021	Mario Cecchini	87	Bishop	Italy (Senigallia)
13 January 2021	Gerry Cottle	75	Circus owner and presenter	United Kingdom (Bath)
13 January 2021	Moses Hamungole	53	Bishop	Zambia (Lusaka)
13 January 2021	Devarapalli Prakash Rao	62	Social worker	India (Cuttack)
13 January 2021	Joël Robert	77	Motocross racer	Belgium (Gilly)
13 January 2021	Eusébio Scheid	88	Cardinal	Brazil (São José dos Campos)
13 January 2021	Philip Tartaglia	70	Archbishop	United Kingdom (Glasgow)
13 January 2021	Maguito Vilela	71	Politician	Brazil (São Paulo)
13 January 2021	Ndubuisi Kanu	77	Politician	Nigeria
13 January 2021	Safwat El-Sherif	87	Politician	Egypt (Cairo)
14 January 2021	Sheikh Ali Jaber	44	Preacher	Indonesia (Jakarta)
14 January 2021	Carlos Armando Biebrich	81	Politician	Mexico (Hermosillo)
14 January 2021	Boris Grachevsky	71	Film director, screenwriter, and actor	Russia (Moscow)
14 January 2021	John LaRose	69	Baseball player	United States (Cumberland)
14 January 2021	Vincent Logan	79	Bishop	United Kingdom (Monifieth)
14 January 2021	Dale Rogers Marshall	83	Academic administrator	United States (Berkeley)
14 January 2021	Elijah Moshinsky	75	Opera director	United Kingdom (London)
14 January 2021	Leonidas Pelekanakis	58	Sailor	Greece
14 January 2021	Larry Willoughby	70	Singer-songwriter and music executive	United States (Sherman)
14 January 2021	Dinesh Chandra Yadav		Politician	Nepal (Kathmandu)
14 January 2021	Amzad Hossain Sarker	73	Politician	Bangladesh (Dhaka)
15 January 2021	Geoff Barnett	74	Footballer	United States (Fort Myers)
15 January 2021	Gildardo García	66	Chess player	Colombia (Medellín)
15 January 2021	Tiit Lilleorg	79	Actor	Estonia (Tartu)
15 January 2021	Lệ Thu	77	Singer	United States (Fountain Valley)
15 January 2021	B. S. Gnanadesikan	71	Politician	India (Chennai)
15 January 2021	Ellen Gwaradzimba	61	Politician	Zimbabwe (Harare)
15 January 2021	Anatoly Vishnevsky	85	Economist	Russia (Moscow)
15 January 2021	Abubakar Mohammed		Politician	Nigeria
15 January 2021	John Oyioka		Politician	Kenya
16 January 2021	Salleh Abas	91	Judge	Malaysia (Kuala Terengganu)
16 January 2021	Mahaveer Bhagora	73	Politician	India
16 January 2021	Jerry Brandt	82	Club owner and manager	United States (Miami Beach)
16 January 2021	Little Walter DeVenne	73	Radio host	United States (Brooksville)
16 January 2021	Juan Carlos Copes	89	Tango dancer and choreographer	Argentina (Buenos Aires)
16 January 2021	György Handel	61	Footballer	Hungary
16 January 2021	Bheki Ntuli	63	Politician	South Africa
16 January 2021	Farida Pasha	68	Actress	Indonesia (Jakarta)
16 January 2021	Phil Spector	81	Record producer, singer-songwriter and convicted murderer	United States (French Camp)
16 January 2021	Paul Varelans	51	Mixed martial arts fighter and wrestler	United States (Atlanta)
16 January 2021	Meghrig Parikian	53	Bishop	Lebanon (Beirut)
17 January 2021	Nikolay Antoshkin	78	Politician and military officer	Russia (Moscow)
17 January 2021	Luis María Cassoni	82	Politician	Argentina (Posadas)
17 January 2021	Robert Cheezic	82	Martial Artist	United States (Wolcott)
17 January 2021	Víctor Crisólogo	68	Politician	Peru
17 January 2021	Abel Gabuza	65	Bishop	South Africa (Durban)
17 January 2021	Gerald Locklin	79	Poet and lecturer	United States (Irvine)
17 January 2021	József Sas	82	Actor, comedian, and theater director	Hungary (Budapest)
17 January 2021	Marius Swart	79	Politician	South Africa (George)
18 January 2021	Carlos Burga	68	Boxer	Peru
18 January 2021	Volodymyr Cherniak	79	Politician	Ukraine
18 January 2021	Andy Gray	61	Actor	United Kingdom
18 January 2021	Nombulelo Hermans	51	Politician	South Africa (Johannesburg)
18 January 2021	Tony Ingle	68	Basketball coach	United States (Provo)
18 January 2021	Winfield Parker	78	Soul and gospel singer-songwriter	United States (Columbia)
18 January 2021	Francisco Daniel Rivera Sánchez	65	Bishop	Mexico (Mexico City)
18 January 2021	Gatot Sudjito	60	Politician	Indonesia (Jakarta)
18 January 2021	K. V. Vijayadas	61	Politician	India (Thrissur)
18 January 2021	Joshua Kyeremeh		Politician	Ghana (Kwabenya)
19 January 2021	Nathaniel Burkett	74	Serial killer	United States (Carson City)
19 January 2021	William Fey	78	Bishop	United States (Pittsburgh)
19 January 2021	Danial Jahić	41	Athlete	Serbia (Ćelije)
19 January 2021	Lâm Quang Thi	88	Military officer	United States (Fremont)
19 January 2021	Stephen Lungu	78	Evangelist	Malawi
19 January 2021	Gustavo Peña	78	Footballer and manager	Mexico (Mexico City)
19 January 2021	Carlos Tapia García	79	Politician	Peru (Lima)
19 January 2021	Ellinah Wamukoya	69	Bishop	Eswatini
20 January 2021	Raisuddin Ahmed	82	Cricketer and administrator	Bangladesh (Dhaka)
20 January 2021	John Baptist Kaggwa	77	Bishop	Uganda (Kampala)
20 January 2021	Sibusiso Moyo	60	Politician	Zimbabwe (Harare)
20 January 2021	Unnikrishnan Namboothiri	97	Actor	India (Kannur)
20 January 2021	Gajendra Singh Shaktawat	47	Politician	India (Delhi)
20 January 2021	Harold Widom	88	Mathematician	United States (Santa Cruz)
20 January 2021	Ian Wilson	81	Cinematographer	United Kingdom (London)
21 January 2021	Calixto Avena	77	Footballer	Colombia (Santa Cruz de Lorica)
21 January 2021	Anthony Mwamba	60	Boxer	Zambia (Lusaka)
21 January 2021	Keith Nichols	75	Jazz pianist	United Kingdom (London)
21 January 2021	Rémy Julienne	90	Rallycross driver, stuntman, and actor	France (Amilly)
21 January 2021	Jackson Mthembu	62	Politician	South Africa (Johannesburg)
22 January 2021	Aeneas Chigwedere	81	Politician	Zimbabwe
22 January 2021	Joel Matiza	60	Politician	Zimbabwe (Harare)
22 January 2021	Meherzia Labidi Maïza	57	Politician	France (Paris)
22 January 2021	James Purify	76	Singer	United States (Pensacola)
22 January 2021	Marius van Heerden	46	Athlete	South Africa (Cape Town)
22 January 2021	Paradzai Zimondi	73	Military officer	Zimbabwe (Harare)
22 January 2021	Feliks Gromov	83	Military officer	Russia
23 January 2021	Carlos Antunes	82	Revolutionary	Portugal (Lisbon)
23 January 2021	Martha Madrigal	91	Poet	Mexico
23 January 2021	Omar Pirrera	88	Poet, writer, and essayist	Italy (Vallo della Lucania)
23 January 2021	Anita R. Schiller	94	Librarian	United States (San Diego)
23 January 2021	Roy Torrens	72	Cricketer and manager	United Kingdom
24 January 2021	Sonny Fox	95	Television host	United States (Encino)
24 January 2021	Abdullahi Ibrahim	82	Politician	Nigeria
24 January 2021	Franciszek Kokot	91	Nephrologist	Poland (Chorzów)
24 January 2021	Sigvard Marjasin	91	Politician	Sweden (Örebro)
24 January 2021	Mike Omoighe	62	Artist and educator	Nigeria
24 January 2021	Marcel Uderzo	87	Comic book artist	France (Évreux)
24 January 2021	Jóhannes Eðvaldsson	70	Footballer	United Kingdom (Glasgow)
25 January 2021	Abla al-Kahlawi	72	Religious leader and scholar	Egypt
25 January 2021	David Bright	64	Football manager	Botswana (Gaborone)
25 January 2021	David Katzenstein	69	Virologist	Zimbabwe (Harare)
25 January 2021	Avelino Méndez Rangel	62	Politician	Mexico (Mexico City)
25 January 2021	Gregory Teu	70	Politician	Tanzania (Arusha)
26 January 2021	Georgi Ananiev	70	Politician	Bulgaria
26 January 2021	Stephen Carter	77	Politician	United States (Baton Rouge)
26 January 2021	James Gita Hakim	66	Cardiologist	Zimbabwe (Harare)
26 January 2021	Ron Johnson	64	Baseball player and manager	United States (Murfreesboro)
26 January 2021	Lars Norén	76	Playwright, novelist, and poet	Sweden (Stockholm)
26 January 2021	Sekou Smith	48	Sportswriter and journalist	United States (Marietta)
26 January 2021	Carlos Holmes Trujillo	69	Politician	Colombia (Bogotá)
27 January 2021	Blas Camacho	81	Politician	Spain (Madrid)
27 January 2021	Ansif Ashraf	37	Magazine editor	United Arab Emirates (Sharjah)
27 January 2021	Goddess Bunny	61	Drag queen and actress	United States (Los Angeles)
27 January 2021	José Cruz	68	Footballer	Honduras (San Pedro Sula)
27 January 2021	Cloris Leachman	94	Actress	United States (Encinitas)
27 January 2021	Corky Lee	73	Photojournalist	United States (Queens)
27 January 2021	Mehrdad Minavand	45	Footballer and manager	Iran (Tehran)
27 January 2021	Carmen Vázquez	72	Activist and writer	United States (New York City)
28 January 2021	Chedly Ayari	87	Politician	Tunisia
28 January 2021	Yvon Douis	85	Footballer	France (Nice)
28 January 2021	Guillermo Galeote	79	Politician	Spain (Madrid)
28 January 2021	Ryszard Kotys	88	Actor	Poland (Poznań)
28 January 2021	Annette Kullenberg	82	Journalist and author	Portugal (Cascais)
28 January 2021	Vasily Lanovoy	87	Actor	Russia (Moscow)
28 January 2021	Juan del Río Martín	73	Archbishop	Spain (Madrid)
28 January 2021	Kenneth Mthiyane	76	Judge	South Africa
28 January 2021	Walter Plywaski	91	Holocaust survivor	United States (Boulder)
28 January 2021	Bachir Skiredj	80	Actor	United States (Orlando)
28 January 2021	Lewis Wolpert	91	Developmental biologist	United Kingdom
28 January 2021	M. C. Managuli	85	Politician	India
29 January 2021	Calane da Silva	75	Writer	Mozambique (Maputo)
29 January 2021	Richard L. Feigen	90	Gallery owner	United States (Mount Kisco)
29 January 2021	José Júlio	84	Bullfighter	Portugal (Vila Franca de Xira)
29 January 2021	Rafael Navarro-Gonzalez	61	Astrobiologist	Mexico
29 January 2021	Percy Tucker	92	Author and ticket selling agent	South Africa (Cape Town)
30 January 2021	Abbas Khan	66	Squash player	United Kingdom (London)
30 January 2021	Wilhelm Knabe	97	Politician and ecologist	Germany (Mülheim)
30 January 2021	Marc Wilmore	57	Comedian and screenwriter	United States (Pomona)
31 January 2021	Zoila Águila Almeida	82	Revolutionary combatant	United States (Hialeah)
31 January 2021	Douglas Bravo	88	Guerrilla fighter	Venezuela (Coro)
31 January 2021	John Gibbons	95	Footballer	United Kingdom
31 January 2021	Noor Alam Chowdhury	77	Politician and judge	India (Kolkata)
31 January 2021	Nate Hawkins	70	American football player	United States (Houston)
31 January 2021	Tozama Mantashe	60	Politician	South Africa
31 January 2021	Wambali Mkandawire	68	Jazz guitarist and singer	Malawi (Lilongwe)
31 January 2021	Michel Murr	88	Politician	Lebanon
31 January 2021	Elizabeth Muyovwe	64	Jurist	Zambia (Lusaka)
31 January 2021	Ray Rayburn	72	Audio engineer	United States (Arlington)
31 January 2021	Yitzchok Scheiner	98	Rabbi	Israel (Jerusalem)
31 January 2021	John M. Squire	75	Biophysicist	United Kingdom (Salisbury)
31 January 2021	Meshulam Dovid Soloveitchik	99	Rabbi	Israel (Jerusalem)
31 January 2021	Ladislav Štaidl	75	Composer	Czech Republic (Prague)
31 January 2021	Miroslav Tuđman	74	Politician	Croatia (Zagreb)
31 January 2021	Abraham J. Twerski	90	Rabbi and psychiatrist	Israel (Jerusalem)
31 January 2021	S. Singaravadivel	87	Politician	India
31 January 2021	Bridget Ntshangase		Politician	South Africa
1 February 2021	Soraya Abdullah	42	Actress	Indonesia
1 February 2021	Emil J. Freireich	93	Oncologist	United States (Houston)
1 February 2021	Jean-Pierre Jossua	90	Writer and theologian	France (Verneuil-sur-Avre)
1 February 2021	Chuck Kaye	80	Music industry executive	United States (Santa Barbara)
1 February 2021	Viktor Koval	73	Writer, actor, and artist	Russia (Moscow)
1 February 2021	Abd al-Sattar Qasim	72	Political analyst and writer	State of Palestine (Nablus)
1 February 2021	Temur Tsiklauri	75	Singer and actor	Georgia (Gori)
1 February 2021	Cynthia Turner	88	Pianist	Malta (Msida)
1 February 2021	Kwasi Sainti Baffoe-Bonnie	71	Politician	Ghana
1 February 2021	Jean-Marie Touratier	78	Writer	France (Paris)
1 February 2021	Gilbert Tshiongo Tshibinkubula wa Ntumba	86	Politician	Democratic Republic of the Congo (Kinshasa)
2 February 2021	Naim Attallah	89	Businessman	United Kingdom
2 February 2021	Cecília Guimarães	93	Actress	Portugal (Lisbon)
2 February 2021	Albert Hale	70	Politician	United States (Mesa)
2 February 2021	Pastor Heydra	78	Politician and journalist	Venezuela
2 February 2021	Grant Jackson	78	Baseball player and coach	United States (North Strabane Township)
2 February 2021	Fausta Morganti	76	Politician	San Marino (City of San Marino)
2 February 2021	David Seyfort Ruegg	89	Buddhologist	United Kingdom (London)
2 February 2021	Jean-François Voguet	71	Politician	France (Saint-Mandé)
2 February 2021	Mitrofan Cioban	79	Mathematician	Moldova (Chișinău)
2 February 2021	John Henry Osmeña	86	Politician	Philippines (Cebu City)
3 February 2021	Ali Ansarian	43	Footballer and actor	Iran (Tehran)
3 February 2021	Benito Boldi	86	Footballer	Italy (Biella)
3 February 2021	Henry Tarvainen	76	Actor	Canada (Toronto)
3 February 2021	Anne Feeney	69	Singer-songwriter and activist	United States (Pittsburgh)
3 February 2021	Alijan Ibragimov	67	Businessman	Belgium (Brussels)
3 February 2021	Adelaide João	99	Actress	Portugal (Lisbon)
3 February 2021	Ismail Kijo	68	Politician	Malaysia (Sungai Buloh)
3 February 2021	Abdoul Aziz Mbaye	66	Politician	Senegal (Dakar)
3 February 2021	Robb Webb	82	Voice artist	United States (New York City)
3 February 2021	Abdelkader Jerbi	84	Film director	Tunisia
4 February 2021	Hy Cohen	90	Baseball player	United States (Rancho Mirage)
4 February 2021	Neville Fernando	89	Politician and doctor	Sri Lanka (Angoda)
4 February 2021	Mathoor Govindan Kutty	80	Dancer	India (Kottayam)
4 February 2021	Jaime Murrell	71	Composer	United States (Miami)
4 February 2021	Zwelifile Christopher Ntuli	67	Politician	South Africa
4 February 2021	David Shepard	73	Politician	United States
4 February 2021	Cesare Leonardi	85	Architect	Italy (Modena)
4 February 2021	Vlastimil Zábranský	84	Visual Artist	Czech Republic (Brno)
5 February 2021	Joseph Benz	76	Bobsledder	Switzerland (Zurich)
5 February 2021	Julio Canani	82	Racehorse breeder and trainer	United States (Pasadena)
5 February 2021	James Bond Kamwambi	53	Politician	Malawi (Chitipa)
5 February 2021	Stephen Bouquet	55	Serial Cat Killer	United Kingdom (Gillingham)
5 February 2021	Butch Reed	66	Wrestler	United States (Warrensburg)
5 February 2021	Hershel Shanks	90	Author and editor	United States (Washington)
5 February 2021	Laurent Dona Fologo	81	Politician	Ivory Coast (Abidjan)
5 February 2021	Francisco Avilán	73	Politician	Mexico
6 February 2021	Zezinho Corrêa	69	Singer	Brazil (Manaus)
6 February 2021	Abdelkhalek Louzani	75	Footballer and coach	Morocco (Essaouira)
6 February 2021	Osvaldo Mércuri	76	Politician	Argentina (San Isidro)
6 February 2021	Claudette White	49	Judge	United States (Yuma)
6 February 2021	Kou Yang	66–67	Scholar	United States (Modesto)
7 February 2021	Luis Feito	91	Painter	Spain (Madrid)
7 February 2021	J. Hillis Miller	92	Literary critic and scholar	United States (Sedgwick)
7 February 2021	José Ramón Ónega	81	Politician, journalist, and writer	Spain (Madrid)
7 February 2021	Isael Villa Villa	65	Politician	Mexico
7 February 2021	Ricardo Silva Elizondo	67	Singer and actor	Mexico (Mexico City)
7 February 2021	Moufida Tlatli	73	Politician and film director	Tunisia (Tunis)
7 February 2021	Ron Wright	67	Politician	United States (Dallas)
8 February 2021	Roza Akkuchukova	70	Singer	Russia (Ufa)
8 February 2021	Claude Crabb	80	American football player	United States (Palm Desert)
8 February 2021	Dave Egerton	59	Rugby union player	United Kingdom (Bristol)
8 February 2021	Adam Kopczyński	72	Ice hockey player	Poland (Zgierz)
8 February 2021	José Maranhão	87	Politician	Brazil (São Paulo)
8 February 2021	Jean Obeid	81	Politician and journalist	Lebanon (Beirut)
8 February 2021	Beatriz Yamamoto Cázarez	63	Politician	Mexico (León)
9 February 2021	Peter C. Clapman	84	Investment chief executive	United States (Bethesda)
9 February 2021	Valeria Gagealov	89	Actress	Romania (Bucharest)
9 February 2021	Franco Marini	87	Politician	Italy (Rome)
9 February 2021	Prince McJunkins	60	Canadian football player	United States (Tulsa)
9 February 2021	Yisa Sofoluwe	53	Footballer	Nigeria (Lagos)
9 February 2021	Ivan Izquierdo	83	Scientist	Brazil (Porto Alegre)
10 February 2021	Zainul Haque Sikder	90	Businessman	United Arab Emirates (Dubai)
10 February 2021	Luc Versteylen	93	Priest	Belgium (Wommelgem)
10 February 2021	Taavo Virkhaus	86	Conductor and composer	United States (Huntsville)
10 February 2021	Mack Walker	91	Historian	United States
11 February 2021	Marcelino da Mata	80	Military officer	Portugal (Lisbon)
11 February 2021	Javier Neves	67	Politician	Peru (Lima)
11 February 2021	Teresa Burga	86	Artist	Peru (Lima)
12 February 2021	Antonio Giménez-Rico	82	Film director and screenwriter	Spain (Madrid)
12 February 2021	Zdeněk Hoření	91	Politician	Czech Republic (Prague)
12 February 2021	Tohami Khaled	75	Military officer	Egypt (Cairo)
12 February 2021	Maurizio Mattei	78	Football referee	Italy (Civitanova Marche)
12 February 2021	Frederick K. C. Price	89	Evangelist	United States (Torrance)
13 February 2021	Olle Nygren	91	Speedway rider	United Kingdom (Ipswich)
13 February 2021	Franz Jalics	93	Jesuit priest and theologian	Hungary (Budapest)
13 February 2021	Sinyo Harry Sarundajang	76	Politician	Indonesia (Jakarta)
13 February 2021	Dave Nalle	61	Political writer, game author, and font designer	United States
13 February 2021	Alberto Oliart	92	Politician	Spain (Madrid)
13 February 2021	Enrique Rodríguez Galindo	82	Military officer and convicted terrorist	Spain (Zaragoza)
13 February 2021	Kadir Topbaş	76	Politician	Turkey (Istanbul)
13 February 2021	Ansley Truitt	70	Basketball player	United States
13 February 2021	Max Vernon	85	Police officer	United Kingdom
13 February 2021	Alan Woan	90	Footballer	United Kingdom
14 February 2021	Berta Berkovich Kohút	99	Holocaust survivor	United States (San Rafael)
14 February 2021	W. J. M. Lokubandara	79	Politician	Sri Lanka (Angoda)
14 February 2021	Ion Mihai Pacepa	92	Intelligence officer and defector	United States (New Jersey)
15 February 2021	Alberto Canapino	57	Racing car engineer	Argentina (Buenos Aires)
15 February 2021	Lucien Gourong	77	Writer, singer, and storyteller	France (Lorient)
15 February 2021	Lucía Guilmáin	83	Actress	Mexico (Mexico City)
15 February 2021	Andréa Guiot	93	Operatic soprano	France (Nîmes)
15 February 2021	Derek Khan	63	Fashion stylist	United Arab Emirates (Dubai)
15 February 2021	Raymond Lévesque	92	Singer-songwriter, poet, and actor	Canada (Montreal)
15 February 2021	Leopoldo Luque	71	Footballer	Argentina (Mendoza)
15 February 2021	Eva Maria Pracht	83	Equestrian	Canada (Toronto)
15 February 2021	Jalaluddin Rakhmat	71	Politician	Indonesia (Bandung)
15 February 2021	István Turu	58	Boxer	Hungary
16 February 2021	Claudio Sorrentino	75	Voice actor and dubbing director	Italy (Rome)
16 February 2021	Yusriansyah Syarkawi	70	Politician	Indonesia (Samarinda)
17 February 2021	Seif Sharif Hamad	77	Politician	Tanzania (Dar es Salaam)
17 February 2021	Christopher Lee	79	Writer and historian	United Kingdom
17 February 2021	Andrea Lo Vecchio	78	Composer, songwriter, and record producer	Italy (Rome)
17 February 2021	Christine McHorse	72	Artist	United States (Santa Fe)
17 February 2021	Joseph Pastor Neelankavil	90	Bishop	India
17 February 2021	Sanjaya Rajaram	77–78	Scientist	Mexico (Ciudad Obregón)
18 February 2021	Amīr Aṣlān Afshār	101	Diplomat	France (Nice)
18 February 2021	Sergo Karapetyan	72	Politician	Armenia (Yerevan)
18 February 2021	Guido Stagnaro	96	Film director and screenwriter	Italy (Milan)
18 February 2021	Abdullahi Dikko	60	Politician	Nigeria (Abuja)
19 February 2021	Đorđe Balašević	67	Singer-songwriter	Serbia (Novi Sad)
19 February 2021	Jerold Ottley	86	Music director	United States (Salt Lake City)
20 February 2021	Mauro Bellugi	71	Footballer	Italy (Milan)
20 February 2021	Koyya Hassan Manik	67	Actor and producer	Maldives (Malé)
20 February 2021	I Gede Ardhika	76	Politician	Indonesia
21 February 2021	Radamés Salazar	46	Politician	Mexico (Mexico City)
21 February 2021	Judy Irola	77	Cinematographer and producer	United States (Los Angeles)
21 February 2021	Mireya Arboleda	92	Pianist	Colombia
22 February 2021	Raymond Cauchetier	101	Photographer	France (Paris)
22 February 2021	Hipólito Chaiña	67	Politician and doctor	Peru (Arequipa)
22 February 2021	Anis al-Naqqash	70	Political activist and guerrilla fighter	Syria (Damascus)
22 February 2021	Benno Ndulu	71	Banker	Tanzania
22 February 2021	Daviz Simango	57	Politician	South Africa
22 February 2021	Consuelo Rodríguez Píriz	60	Politician	Spain (Badajoz)
23 February 2021	Fausto Gresini	60	Motorcycle racer and team manager	Italy (Bologna)
23 February 2021	Herbin Hoyos	53	Journalist and broadcaster	Colombia (Bogotá)
23 February 2021	Peter Harris	88	Director	United Kingdom (Ferndown)
23 February 2021	Bheem Prasad Sonkar	64	Politician	India (Azamgarh)
24 February 2021	Sylvia Murphy	89	Singer	Canada (Mississauga)
24 February 2021	Sardool Sikander	60	Folk singer	India (Chandigarh)
24 February 2021	Khondkar Ibrahim Khaled	80	Economist	Bangladesh (Dhaka)
24 February 2021	Ayong Maliksi	82	Politician	Philippines (Imus)
25 February 2021	Mashari Al-Ballam	49	Actor	Kuwait
25 February 2021	Klaus Emmerich	92	Journalist	Austria (Vienna)
25 February 2021	Bob Pixel	44	Photographer and graphic designer	Ghana
25 February 2021	Juan Francisco Sarasti Jaramillo	82	Bishop	Colombia (Cali)
25 February 2021	Bahjat Suleiman	72	Diplomat and military officer	Syria (Damascus)
25 February 2021	Arkady Davidowitz	90	Writer	Russia
25 February 2021	Vladimir Zuykov	86	Animator	Russia (Moscow)
26 February 2021	Yves Ramousse	93	Bishop	France (Montauban)
26 February 2021	David Manyok Barac Atem	62	Military officer	South Sudan (Juba)
26 February 2021	Tarek El-Bishry	87	Judge	Egypt (Cairo)
26 February 2021	Bill C. Davis	69	Playwright and actor	United States (Torrington)
26 February 2021	José Guccione	69	Politician	Argentina (Posadas)
26 February 2021	Àngel Pla	91	Woodcarver	Andorra (Andorra la Vella)
26 February 2021	György Snell	71	Bishop	Hungary (Budapest)
26 February 2021	Gabriel Zavala	76	Mariachi musician	United States (Anaheim)
27 February 2021	Mike Bradner	83	Politician	United States (Anchorage)
27 February 2021	Rachel Cathoud	74	Actress	Switzerland (Geneva)
27 February 2021	José Manuel Cortizas	58	Sports journalist and voice actor	Spain (Barakaldo)
27 February 2021	Dante Crippa	83	Footballer	Italy (Brescia)
27 February 2021	Marta Martin Carrera-Ruiz	80	Television personality	Cuba
27 February 2021	Mariano Valdés Chávarri	74	Cardiologist	Spain (El Palmar)
27 February 2021	Erica Watson	48	Actress	Jamaica (Montego Bay)
27 February 2021	Pascal Monkam	90	Businessman	South Africa
28 February 2021	Sabah Abdul-Jalil	69	Footballer and coach	Iraq (Baghdad)
28 February 2021	Aqel Biltaji	80	Politician	Jordan
28 February 2021	Tom Green	72	Mormon fundamentalist	United States (Salt Lake City)
28 February 2021	Anna Majani	85	Entrepreneur	Italy (Bologna)
28 February 2021	Jorge Oñate	71	Singer	Colombia (Medellín)
28 February 2021	Yousuf Shaaban	89	Actor	Egypt (Giza)
1 March 2021	Frederico Campos	93	Politician	Brazil (Cuiabá)
1 March 2021	Víctor Espinoza Peña	73	Politician	Peru
1 March 2021	Emmanuel Félémou	60	Bishop	Guinea (Conakry)
1 March 2021	Jorge Marticorena Cuba	64	Politician	Peru (Lima)
1 March 2021	Milenko Savović	60	Basketball player	Serbia (Belgrade)
1 March 2021	Mikhail Studenetsky	86	Basketball player	Russia
1 March 2021	Agim Krajka	83	Composer	Albania (Tirana)
2 March 2021	Nandkumar Singh Chauhan	68	Politician	India (Thane)
3 March 2021	Diego Gómez	84	Journalist, actor, and broadcaster	Spain (Málaga)
3 March 2021	Jerzy Limon	70	Theater director	Poland (Gdańsk)
3 March 2021	Ruy Scarpino	59	Football manager	Brazil (Manaus)
3 March 2021	Maria José Valério	87	Singer	Portugal (Lisbon)
3 March 2021	Edward Sandoval	74	Politician	United States (Albuquerque)
4 March 2021	Kamal Amer	78	Politician	Egypt (Cairo)
4 March 2021	Karima Brown	54	Radio broadcaster and journalist	South Africa (Johannesburg)
4 March 2021	Jim Crockett Jr.	76	Wrestling promoter	United States (Charlotte)
4 March 2021	Atanasije Jevtić	83	Bishop	Bosnia and Herzegovina (Trebinje)
4 March 2021	František Lízna	79	Jesuit priest	Czech Republic (Olomouc)
5 March 2021	Stig Malm	79	Trade unionist	Sweden (Stockholm)
5 March 2021	José Carlos da Silva Júnior	94	Politician	Brazil (São Paulo)
5 March 2021	Mo Pinel	78	Mechanical engineer	United States (Baton Rouge)
5 March 2021	Carlo Tognoli	82	Politician	Italy (Milan)
6 March 2021	Abdul Ghani Gilong	88	Politician	Malaysia (Kota Kinabalu)
6 March 2021	Sawsan Rabie	58	Actress	Egypt (Giza)
7 March 2021	Sanja Ilić	69	Composer	Serbia (Belgrade)
7 March 2021	Mirko Pavinato	86	Footballer	Italy (Bologna)
7 March 2021	Nikolay Smorchkov	90	Actor	Russia (Moscow)
8 March 2021	Kuryana Azis	69	Politician	Indonesia (Palembang)
8 March 2021	Adrian Bărar	61	Guitarist and composer	Romania (Timișoara)
8 March 2021	Djibril Tamsir Niane	89	Writer and historian	Senegal (Dakar)
8 March 2021	Rafael Palmero Ramos	84	Bishop	Spain (Alicante)
8 March 2021	Anshuman Singh	85	Politician	India
9 March 2021	Adnan Abdallat	78	Neurologist	Jordan
9 March 2021	Adhemar Santillo	81	Politician	Brazil (Anápolis)
9 March 2021	Jiří Ventruba	71	Politician and neurosurgeon	Czech Republic (Prague)
9 March 2021	Hilman Hariwijaya	57	Writer	Indonesia (Jakarta)
10 March 2021	Henri-Thomas Lokondo	65	Politician	South Africa (Johannesburg)
10 March 2021	Lyudmila Lyadova	95	Composer and singer	Russia (Moscow)
10 March 2021	Ali Mahdi Muhammad	82	Politician	Kenya (Nairobi)
10 March 2021	Veaceslav Țurcan	55	Lawyer	Moldova (Chișinău)
10 March 2021	Tomás Vidiella	83	Film director, actor, and cultural manager	Chile (Santiago)
10 March 2021	Jan Vodňanský	79	Writer	Czech Republic
11 March 2021	Mauro Aparecido dos Santos	66	Bishop	Brazil (Cascavel)
11 March 2021	Mahmud Us Samad Chowdhury	66	Politician	Bangladesh (Dhaka)
11 March 2021	Petar Fajfrić	79	Handball player and coach	Serbia (Šabac)
11 March 2021	Florentín Giménez	95	Pianist and composer	Paraguay (Asunción)
12 March 2021	Andrés Abt	47	Politician	Uruguay (Montevideo)
12 March 2021	Fatima Aziz	47	Politician	Switzerland
12 March 2021	Nicolae Dabija	72	Politician, writer, and historian	Moldova (Chișinău)
12 March 2021	Uruguay Graffigna	73	Footballer	Chile (Quillota)
12 March 2021	Goodwill Zwelithini	72	King of the Zulus	South Africa (Durban)
13 March 2021	Raoul Casadei	83	Musician and composer	Italy (Cesena)
13 March 2021	Silvio Favero	54	Politician and lawyer	Brazil (Cuiabá)
13 March 2021	Giovanni Gastel	65	Photographer	Italy (Milan)
13 March 2021	Obren Joksimović	68	Politician	Serbia (Belgrade)
13 March 2021	Roger Maes	77	Volleyball player	Belgium (Ghent)
13 March 2021	Kiyoko Ono	85	Politician and gymnast	Japan (Tokyo)
14 March 2021	Aurora Cornu	89	Writer, actress, film director, and translator	France (Paris)
14 March 2021	Thione Seck	66	Singer	Senegal (Dakar)
14 March 2021	Francesco Trabucco	76	Architect	Italy (Milan)
15 March 2021	Jim Dornan	73	Gynecologist	United Kingdom
15 March 2021	Dragoljub Đuričić	68	Drummer	Serbia (Belgrade)
15 March 2021	Ahmed Mumin Warfa		Scientist	Somalia (Mogadishu)
16 March 2021	Líviusz Gyulai	83	Graphic artist	Hungary (Budapest)
16 March 2021	Amaranth Ehrenhalt	93	Painter, sculptor, and writer	United States (New York City)
16 March 2021	Mauro Favilla	87	Politician	Italy (Lucca)
16 March 2021	David Dias Pimentel	79	Bishop	Brazil (São João da Boa Vista)
16 March 2021	Euclides Scalco	88	Politician and pharmacist	Brazil (Curitiba)
16 March 2021	Turi Simeti	91	Painter	Italy (Milan)
17 March 2021	Helenês Cândido	86	Politician	Brazil (Caldas Novas)
17 March 2021	Anton Gămurari	70	Military officer	Moldova (Chișinău)
17 March 2021	Dilipkumar Gandhi	69	Politician	India (Delhi)
17 March 2021	Antón García Abril	87	Composer	Spain (Madrid)
17 March 2021	Ulisses dos Santos	91	Athlete	Brazil (Macapá)
17 March 2021	John Magufuli	61	Politician	Tanzania (Dar es Salaam)
18 March 2021	Shaker Abdul Hamid	68	Politician	Egypt (Giza)
18 March 2021	Herzem Gusmão Pereira	72	Politician	Brazil (São Paulo)
18 March 2021	Major Olímpio	58	Politician	Brazil (São Paulo)
18 March 2021	Jerzy Prokopiuk	89	Philosopher	Poland
18 March 2021	Skariah Thomas	77	Politician	India (Kochi)
19 March 2021	Luis Armando Bambarén Gastelumendi	93	Bishop	Peru (Lima)
19 March 2021	Cristián Cuturrufo	48	Trumpeter	Chile (Santiago)
19 March 2021	Aurelio Desdentado	76	Judge	Spain (Madrid)
19 March 2021	Irmão Lázaro	54	Politician and singer	Brazil (Feira de Santana)
19 March 2021	Adel Nassief	58	Painter	Egypt
20 March 2021	Buddy Deppenschmidt	85	Jazz drummer	United States (Doylestown)
20 March 2021	Milan Hurtala	74	Rower	Slovakia (Bratislava)
20 March 2021	Rito Jiménez	70	Politician	Venezuela
20 March 2021	Vladimir Kirsanov	73	Choreographer and dancer	Russia (Moscow)
20 March 2021	Richard Mendani	53	Politician	Papua New Guinea (Port Moresby)
20 March 2021	Yevgeny Nesterenko	83	Singer	Austria (Vienna)
21 March 2021	Jeff Grayshon	72	Rugby player	United Kingdom
21 March 2021	Honoré Ngbanda	74	Politician	Morocco
22 March 2021	Henrique do Rego Almeida	84	Politician	Brazil (Curitiba)
22 March 2021	Joseph Daaboul	62	Poet and proofreader	Lebanon
22 March 2021	Lorna Irungu	51	Television presenter and executive	Kenya (Nairobi)
22 March 2021	Tatyana Lolova	87	Actress	Bulgaria (Sofia)
22 March 2021	Guy Brice Parfait Kolélas	61	Politician	France (Bonneuil-en-France)
22 March 2021	Susana Canales	87	Actress	Spain (Madrid)
23 March 2021	Alberto Ciurana	60	Television producer	Mexico (Mexico City)
23 March 2021	Granville Waiters	60	Basketball player	United States (Columbus)
23 March 2021	Hakob Hakobyan	58	Politician	Armenia
24 March 2021	Alex Andjelic	80	Ice hockey player and coach	Serbia (Belgrade)
24 March 2021	Haroldo Lima	81	Politician	Brazil (Salvador)
24 March 2021	Hanna Lypkivska	53	Theatrologist	Ukraine (Kyiv)
24 March 2021	Vlasta Velisavljević	94	Actor	Serbia (Belgrade)
25 March 2021	Luran Ahmeti	47	Actor	North Macedonia (Skopje)
25 March 2021	Manuel Dammert	72	Politician and sociologist	Peru (Lima)
25 March 2021	Randy Tate	68	Baseball player	United States (Muscle Shoals)
25 March 2021	Jan Waszkiewicz	77	Politician	Poland (Wrocław)
25 March 2021	Alberto Sonsol	63	Journalist	Uruguay (Montevideo)
25 March 2021	Syarwan Hamid	77	Politician	Indonesia (Cimahi)
26 March 2021	Cornelia Catangă	63	Singer	Romania (Bucharest)
26 March 2021	Želimir Altarac Čičak	73	Music promoter	Bosnia and Herzegovina (Sarajevo)
27 March 2021	Zafir Hadžimanov	77	Singer and actor	Serbia (Belgrade)
27 March 2021	Paulo Stein	73	Journalist	Brazil (Rio de Janeiro)
27 March 2021	Mahbubar Rahman	81	Politician	Bangladesh (Dhaka)
27 March 2021	Antonio Sanchez	74	Politician	Philippines
28 March 2021	Juventino Kestering	74	Bishop	Brazil (Rondonópolis)
28 March 2021	Halyna Hai	64	Poet	Ukraine (Bila Tserkva)
28 March 2021	Constantin Simirad	79	Politician	Romania (Iași)
29 March 2021	Bashkim Fino	58	Politician	Albania (Tirana)
29 March 2021	Theodore Lambrinos	85	Opera singer	United States (Brooklyn)
29 March 2021	Robert Opron	89	Automotive designer	France (Antony)
29 March 2021	Joseph Nekl	68	Politician	Czech Republic
30 March 2021	Maria Bofill	83–84	Potter	Spain (Barcelona)
30 March 2021	Claire dela Fuente	62	Singer	Philippines (Las Piñas)
30 March 2021	Maurizio Moretti	76	Footballer	Italy (Friuli)
30 March 2021	Virendra Singh	64	Politician	India (Bareilly)
31 March 2021	Anzor Erkomaishvili	80	Politician and singer	Georgia (Tbilisi)
31 March 2021	Ivan Klajn	84	Linguist	Serbia (Belgrade)
31 March 2021	Ivair Nogueira do Pinho	69	Politician	Brazil (Belo Horizonte)
31 March 2021	Carlos Pedro Zilli	66	Bishop	Guinea-Bissau (Prabis)
31 March 2021	Kamal Ganzouri	88	Politician	Egypt (Cairo)
1 April 2021	Giorgio Gatti	72	Singer	Italy (Rome)
1 April 2021	Nemam Ghafouri	52	Physician, activist, and humanitarian	Sweden (Stockholm)
1 April 2021	Angelo Perugini	65	Politician	Brazil (São Paulo)
1 April 2021	Hanna Arsenych-Baran	50	Writer	Ukraine (Chernihiv)
1 April 2021	Piet Junius	79	Politician	Namibia (Windhoek)
1 April 2021	Jorge Chiarella Krüger	77	Actor	Peru (Lima)
2 April 2021	H. Balasubramaniam	88	Translator	India
2 April 2021	Celestino Bonifacio Bacalé	64	Politician	Cameroon (Douala)
2 April 2021	Mykhailo Kushnerenko	82	Politician	Ukraine (Kherson)
2 April 2021	Gabi Luncă	82	Singer	Romania (Bucharest)
2 April 2021	Mohammed Oreibi Al-Khalifa	51	Judge	Iraq (Baghdad)
2 April 2021	Nelu Ploieșteanu	70	Singer	Romania (Bucharest)
2 April 2021	Jean Luc Rosat	67	Volleyball player	Brazil (Rio de Janeiro)
3 April 2021	José Adauto Bezerra	94	Politician	Brazil (Fortaleza)
3 April 2021	Elidio Espinoza	65	Politician	Peru (La Esperanza)
3 April 2021	Yinka Odumakin	54	Human rights activist and politician	Nigeria (Lagos)
3 April 2021	Agnaldo Timóteo	84	Politician and singer	Brazil (Rio de Janeiro)
3 April 2021	Yevgeniy Zagorulko	78	High jump coach	Russia
3 April 2021	Wali Rahmani	79	Scholar	India (Patna)
4 April 2021	Francisco Haghenbeck	56	Writer and comics screenwriter	Mexico (Tehuacán)
4 April 2021	António Almeida Henriques	59	Politician	Portugal (Viseu)
4 April 2021	Victoria Kovalchuk	67	Illustrator, writer, and designer	Ukraine (Lviv)
4 April 2021	Frank Mdlalose	89	Politician	South Africa
4 April 2021	Bhagwati Singh	88	Politician	India (Bakshi Ka Talab)
4 April 2021	Traffic Ramaswamy	87	Politician	India (Chennai)
4 April 2021	Homero Cavalheiro	73	Footballer	Brazil (Porto Alegre)
5 April 2021	Robert de Almendra Freitas	73	Politician	Brazil (Teresina)
5 April 2021	Vladimir Gendlin	84	Television journalist and sports commentator	Russia (Moscow)
5 April 2021	Krzysztof Krawczyk	74	Singer, guitarist, and composer	Poland (Łódź)
5 April 2021	Izz al-Din Manasirah	74	Poet, critic, and academic	Jordan (Amman)
5 April 2021	Malcolm Kela Smith	77	Politician	Australia (Redcliffe)
5 April 2021	Henry Stephen	79	Singer	Venezuela (Caracas)
5 April 2021	Qabdesh Zhumadilov	84	Writer	Kazakhstan
6 April 2021	Rodolfo da Ponte	82	Fencer	Paraguay (Asunción)
6 April 2021	Hans Kristian Gaarder	60	Conspiracy theorist	Norway (Gran)
6 April 2021	Umbu Landu Paranggi	77	Artist and poet	Indonesia (Sanur)
6 April 2021	Lefteris Mytilineos	74	Singer	Greece (Corinth)
6 April 2021	Jan Purwinski	86	Bishop	Ukraine (Zhytomyr)
6 April 2021	Nestor Torre Jr.	78	Screenwriter, director, and journalist	Philippines (Manila)
6 April 2021	Predrag Živković Tozovac	85	Folk musician and actor	Serbia (Belgrade)
6 April 2021	Fatima Zakaria	85	Journalist	India (Aurangabad)
7 April 2021	Alfredo Bosi	84	Historian	Brazil (São Paulo)
7 April 2021	Indra Mohan Rajbongshi	75	Singer	Bangladesh (Dhaka)
8 April 2021	Diána Igaly	56	Sport shooter	Hungary (Budapest)
8 April 2021	Roseli Machado	52	Athlete	Brazil (Curitiba)
8 April 2021	Mahyuddin N. S.	73	Politician and academic	Indonesia (Palembang)
8 April 2021	Alan Pastrana	76	American football player	United States (Annapolis)
8 April 2021	César Ramón Ortega Herrera	83	Bishop	Venezuela
8 April 2021	Shakeel Ahmed Samdani	59	Scholar	India
9 April 2021	Raosaheb Antapurkar	62	Politician	India
9 April 2021	Shyama Charan Gupta	76	Politician	India (Delhi)
9 April 2021	Rudolf Furmanov	82	Actor	Russia (Saint Petersburg)
9 April 2021	Abdul Hamid Sebba	86	Politician	Brazil (Goiânia)
9 April 2021	Helímenas de Jesús Rojo Paredes	95	Archbishop	Venezuela
10 April 2021	István Bérczi	75	Gymnast	Hungary
10 April 2021	Rossana Di Bello	64	Politician	Italy (Taranto)
10 April 2021	Satish Kaul	74	Actor	India (Ludhiana)
10 April 2021	Ivan Yefimovich Zhukov	86	Military officer	Russia (Vladimir)
10 April 2021	Marcio Veloz Maggiolo	84	Writer, archaeologist, and anthropologist	Dominican Republic (Santo Domingo)
10 April 2021	Sindisiwe van Zyl	45	Physician and HIV activist	South Africa (Johannesburg)
10 April 2021	Varghese Paul	77	Writer	India (Vadodara)
10 April 2021	Hassan Shahriar	74	Journalist	Bangladesh
11 April 2021	Nelson Bornier	71	Politician	Brazil (Rio de Janeiro)
11 April 2021	Pedro Ivo Ferreira Caminhas	68	Politician	Brazil (Betim)
11 April 2021	Tulio Manuel Chirivella Varela	88	Bishop	United States (Miami)
11 April 2021	Massimo Cuttitta	54	Rugby union player and manager	Italy (Albano Laziale)
11 April 2021	Mita Haque	58	Singer	Bangladesh (Dhaka)
11 April 2021	Füzuli Javadov	70	Footballer	Azerbaijan (Baku)
11 April 2021	Justo Jorge Padrón	77	Poet, essayist, and translator	Spain (Madrid)
11 April 2021	Zoran Simjanović	74	Composer and musician	Serbia (Belgrade)
11 April 2021	Mauro Viale	73	Journalist and television presenter	Argentina (Buenos Aires)
12 April 2021	Dhanare Paskal Janya	49	Politician	India (Mumbai)
12 April 2021	Carles Trullols i Clemente	72	Roller hockey player and coach	Spain (Barcelona)
12 April 2021	Sergei Yashin	60	Ice hockey Player	Russia
12 April 2021	Jalal Yousef	41	Pool Player	Venezuela
13 April 2021	Farid Ahmed	60	Composer and music director	Bangladesh (Dhaka)
13 April 2021	Maqbul Ahmed	81	Politician	Bangladesh (Dhaka)
13 April 2021	Rocco Filippini	77	Cellist	Switzerland (Lugano)
13 April 2021	Paul Oquist	78	Politician and presidential advisor	Nicaragua (Managua)
13 April 2021	Irondi Pugliesi	73	Politician	Brazil (Arapongas)
13 April 2021	Ruth Roberta de Souza	52	Basketball player	Brazil (Três Lagoas)
13 April 2021	José Carlos Schiavinato	66	Politician and engineer	Brazil (Brasília)
13 April 2021	Walter Spitzer	93	Artist and Holocaust survivor	France (Paris)
13 April 2021	Patricio Hacbang Alo	82	Bishop	Philippines
14 April 2021	Eduardo Enríquez Maya	72	Politician	Colombia (Bogotá)
14 April 2021	Abdul Matin Khasru	71	Politician	Bangladesh (Dhaka)
14 April 2021	Shamsuzzaman Khan	80	Folklorist	Bangladesh (Dhaka)
14 April 2021	Marcelo Angiolo Melani	82	Bishop	Peru (Pucallpa)
14 April 2021	Yıldırım Akbulut	85	Politician	Turkey (Ankara)
15 April 2021	Moshe Ber Beck	86	Rabbi and anti-Zionist campaigner	United States (Monsey)
15 April 2021	Dário de Castro	72	Voice actor	Brazil (Rio de Janeiro)
15 April 2021	Azmeera Chandulal	66	Politician	India (Hyderabad)
15 April 2021	Clotilda Douglas-Yakimchuk	89	Nurse	Canada (Halifax)
15 April 2021	Mao Ayuth	76	Film director	Cambodia (Phnom Penh)
15 April 2021	Luisa Revilla	49	Politician	Peru (Trujillo)
15 April 2021	Adelino Sitoy	85	Lawyer	Philippines (Cebu City)
15 April 2021	Dimitrios Talaganis	76	Architect, artist, and poet	Greece (Athens)
15 April 2021	Đorđe Marjanović	89	Singer	Serbia (Belgrade)
16 April 2021	Hussain Ahmed	89	Footballer	India (Bengaluru)
16 April 2021	Nader Dastneshan	61	Footballer and coach	Iran (Qaem Shahr)
16 April 2021	Ludmila Guzun	59	Politician	Moldova
16 April 2021	Ranjit Sinha	68	Police officer	India
17 April 2021	Luiz Humberto Carneiro	68	Politician	Brazil (Uberlândia)
17 April 2021	Josep Mussons	95	Businessman	Spain (Barcelona)
17 April 2021	Kabori	70	Politician and actress	Bangladesh (Dhaka)
17 April 2021	Narendra Kohli	81	Novelist and academic	India (Delhi)
17 April 2021	Erol Demiröz	81	Actor	Turkey (Ankara)
17 April 2021	Sabino Vengco	79	Priest	Philippines (Manila)
17 April 2021	Skënder Temali	75	Writer	Albania
18 April 2021	Michael Bedford-Jones	79	Bishop	Canada (Oshawa)
18 April 2021	Achyut Madhav Gokhale	75	Civil servant	India (Pune)
18 April 2021	S. M. Mohsin	73	Actor	Bangladesh (Dhaka)
18 April 2021	Paul Oscher	74	Singer	United States (Austin)
18 April 2021	Necdet Üruğ	100	Military officer	Turkey (Istanbul)
18 April 2021	Bachi Singh Rawat	71	Politician	India (Rishikesh)
18 April 2021	A. Pappa Sundaram	89	Politician	India
18 April 2021	Ludovico Badoy	69	Politician	Philippines (Caloocan)
18 April 2021	Anupama Puchimanda	41	Field hockey player	India
19 April 2021	Pedro Bastidas	45	Politician	Venezuela
19 April 2021	Mewalal Chaudhary	68	Politician	India (Patna)
19 April 2021	Eduardo de Lázzari	76	Judge	Argentina (La Plata)
19 April 2021	Nasir Durrani	64	Police officer	Pakistan (Lahore)
19 April 2021	Michel Kilo	80	Writer and human rights activist	France (Paris)
19 April 2021	Jagdish Singh Rana	66	Politician	India (Saharanpur)
19 April 2021	Gopal Krishna Saxena	70	Politician	India
19 April 2021	Viktor Shuvalov	97	Ice hockey player and footballer	Russia (Moscow)
20 April 2021	Shyam Bihari Misra	82	Politician	India (Delhi)
20 April 2021	Kishore Nandlaskar	81	Actor	India (Thane)
20 April 2021	M. Narasimham	93	Banker	India (Hyderabad)
20 April 2021	José Joaquín Puig de la Bellacasa	89	Politician and diplomat	Spain (Madrid)
20 April 2021	Emilia Monjowa Lifaka	62	Politician	Cameroon
21 April 2021	Naïma Ababsa	51	Singer	Algeria (Algiers)
21 April 2021	Bhitali Das	51	Singer	India (Guwahati)
21 April 2021	Marc Ferro	96	Historian	France (Saint-Germain-en-Laye)
21 April 2021	Shankha Ghosh	89	Poet and critic	India (Kolkata)
21 April 2021	Wahiduddin Khan	96	Scholar	India (New Delhi)
21 April 2021	Johny Lal		Cinematographer	India (Mumbai)
21 April 2021	Lea Dali Lion	47	Singer	Estonia (Tallinn)
21 April 2021	Joe Long	88	Bassist	United States (Long Beach Township)
21 April 2021	Segismundo Martínez Álvarez	78	Bishop	Brazil (Campo Grande)
21 April 2021	Erasmo Vásquez		Politician	Dominican Republic (Santiago de los Caballeros)
21 April 2021	Kunja Bojji	95	Politician	India
21 April 2021	Antonio Palang	78	Bishop	Philippines
22 April 2021	Adnan al-Assadi	68–69	Politician	Iraq (Baghdad)
22 April 2021	Alípio Freire	75	Writer and journalist	Brazil (São Paulo)
22 April 2021	Selma Gürbüz	60–61	Sculptor and painter	Turkey (Istanbul)
22 April 2021	Dennis Johnson	81	Sprinter	Jamaica
22 April 2021	Jacqueline Mofokeng	61	Politician	South Africa (Irene)
22 April 2021	Shravan Rathod	66	Singer	India (Mumbai)
22 April 2021	Ashok Kumar Walia	72	Politician	India (New Delhi)
22 April 2021	Ramesh Diwkar	56	Politician	India
22 April 2021	Edmundo Galdino	63	Politician	Brazil (Araguaína)
23 April 2021	Lalit Behl	71	Actor, film director, producer, and writer	India
23 April 2021	Abderrahmane Benkhalfa	71	Politician	Algeria (Algiers)
23 April 2021	Dukha Bhagat	67	Politician	India
23 April 2021	Levy Fidelix	69	Politician	Brazil (São Paulo)
23 April 2021	Suresh Srivastava	76	Politician	India (Lucknow)
23 April 2021	Victor Wood	75	Singer and actor	Philippines (Quezon City)
24 April 2021	La Camboria	90	Dancer	Spain
24 April 2021	Habib ur Rahman	73	Politician	Pakistan
24 April 2021	Alber Elbaz	59	Fashion designer	France (Paris)
24 April 2021	Ziaur Rahman Khan	75	Politician	Bangladesh (Dhaka)
24 April 2021	A. M. M. Safiullah	73	Academic	Bangladesh (Dhaka)
24 April 2021	Miloš Šobajić	75	Painter and sculptor	Serbia (Belgrade)
24 April 2021	Onkar Nath Srivastava	78	Physicist	India (Varanasi)
24 April 2021	Hugo Stuven Cangas	80	Television director and producer	Spain (Madrid)
24 April 2021	Riitta Vainionpää	68	Textile artist	Sweden (Stockholm)
24 April 2021	Bob Fass	87	Radio personality	United States (Monroe)
24 April 2021	Silvio Lega	76	Politician	Italy (Siena)
25 April 2021	Pablo José Cámbar	78	Academic, researcher, and physician	Honduras (Tegucigalpa)
25 April 2021	Óscar Castro Ramírez	73	Actor and playwright	France (Paris)
25 April 2021	Hamid Jasemian	84	Footballer	Iran (Tehran)
25 April 2021	Toshiro Kandagawa	81	Chef	Japan (Osaka)
25 April 2021	Mohan Shantanagoudar	62	Judge	India (Gurgaon)
25 April 2021	Mishra Rajan Mishra	70	Singer	India (New Delhi)
26 April 2021	Manzoor Ahtesham	73	Writer	India (Bhopal)
26 April 2021	Ramu	53	Film producer	India (Bangalore)
26 April 2021	Rao Dharampal	79	Politician	India
26 April 2021	Arvind Kumar	91	Journalist	India (New Delhi)
26 April 2021	Sugrib Singh	57	Politician	India (Bhubaneswar)
27 April 2021	Jan Stefan Gałecki	88	Bishop	Poland (Szczecin)
27 April 2021	Kakhi Kavsadze	85	Actor	Georgia (Tbilisi)
27 April 2021	Toto Natividad	63	Film director	Philippines (San Fernando)
27 April 2021	Karuna Shukla	70	Politician	India (Raipur)
27 April 2021	Thamira	53	Film director	India (Chennai)
27 April 2021	Isaac Mogase	87	Politician	South Africa
27 April 2021	P. Selvie Das	89	Politician	India
27 April 2021	Sidnal Shanmukhappa Basappa	85	Politician	India
28 April 2021	Celso Dayrit	69	Fencer and sports executive	Philippines
28 April 2021	Anish Deb	69	Writer	India (Kolkata)
28 April 2021	Miguel Ángel Furones	71	Publicist and writer	Spain (Madrid)
28 April 2021	Eknath Gaikwad	81	Politician	India
28 April 2021	Kesar Singh	64	Politician	India (Noida)
28 April 2021	Federico Salas	70	Politician	Peru (Huancavelica)
28 April 2021	Gouri Sankar Dutta	70	Politician	India
28 April 2021	Balihari		Politician	India
29 April 2021	Riyaz Ahmad	62	Politician	India
29 April 2021	Amris	63	Politician and military officer	Indonesia (Pekanbaru)
29 April 2021	José Francisco Gallardo Rodríguez	75	Military officer	Mexico
29 April 2021	Rajendrasingh Baghel	75	Politician	India (Indore)
29 April 2021	Kunwar Bechain	78	Poet	India (Noida)
29 April 2021	Allan Cosio	79	Painter and sculptor	Philippines (Pampanga)
29 April 2021	Johnny Crawford	74	Actor, singer, and musician	United States (Los Angeles)
29 April 2021	Laxman Giluwa	56	Politician	India (Jamshedpur)
30 April 2021	K. V. Anand	54	Cinematographer and film director	India (Chennai)
30 April 2021	Kom Chuanchuen	63	Actor and comedian	Thailand
30 April 2021	Khelan Ram Jangde	74	Politician	India
30 April 2021	Jagdish Lad	34	Bodybuilder	India (Vadodara)
30 April 2021	Rohit Sardana	41	News anchor and editor	India (Noida)
30 April 2021	Soli Sorabjee	91	Lawyer	India (Delhi)
30 April 2021	Sanjay Kumar Seth	63	Judge	India
30 April 2021	Chandro Tomar	89	Sharp shooter	India (Meerut)
30 April 2021	Jevgeni Tomberg	72	Politician	Estonia (Tallinn)
30 April 2021	Abul Hasnat Khan	78	Politician	India
30 April 2021	Pio Vittorio Vigo	86	Bishop	Italy (Verona)
1 May 2021	Debu Chaudhuri	85	Sitarist and writer	India (Delhi)
1 May 2021	José Daniel Falla Robles	64	Bishop	Colombia (Soacha)
1 May 2021	Jean Fontaine	84	Theologian and writer	Tunisia (Tunis)
1 May 2021	Bikramjeet Kanwarpal	52	Actor	India (Mumbai)
1 May 2021	Ghulam Mohammed Khan	74	Equestrian	India (Pune)
1 May 2021	Ricardo Alberto Ramírez	48	Footballer	Argentina
1 May 2021	Mikhail Plotkin	77	Music producer and administrator	Russia (Moscow)
1 May 2021	Kishan Rungta	88	Cricketer and administrator	India (Jaipur)
1 May 2021	Mohammad Shahabuddin	53	Politician and convicted kidnapper	India (Delhi)
1 May 2021	Henry Ventura	56	Politician	Venezuela (Caracas)
1 May 2021	Rafael Roncagliolo	76	Politician	Peru (Lima)
1 May 2021	Stuart Woolf	85	Historian	United Kingdom
2 May 2021	S. G. Neginhal	92	Forester	India (Bangalore)
2 May 2021	Damodar Barku Shingada	66	Politician	India
3 May 2021	Rafael Albrecht	79	Footballer	Argentina (Buenos Aires)
3 May 2021	Vinod Kumar Bansal	71	Educationist	India (Kota)
3 May 2021	María Colombo de Acevedo	64	Politician	Argentina (San Fernando del Valle de Catamarca)
3 May 2021	Sabbam Hari	68	Politician	India (Visakhapatnam)
3 May 2021	Hamid Rashid Ma`ala		Politician	Iraq
3 May 2021	Burhanettin Uysal	53	Politician	Turkey (Ankara)
3 May 2021	Béchir Ben Yahmed	93	Journalist	France (Paris)
3 May 2021	Ram Charitra Nishad	57	Politician	India (Noida)
3 May 2021	R. Balakrishna Pillai	86	Politician	India (Kottarakkara)
4 May 2021	Antony Anandarayar	75	Bishop	India (Chennai)
4 May 2021	Omar Hugo Gómez	65	Footballer	Argentina (Florencio Varela)
4 May 2021	Paulo Gustavo	42	Actor and comedian	Brazil (Rio de Janeiro)
4 May 2021	Abhilasha Patil	47	Actress	India (Mumbai)
4 May 2021	Willian Santiago	30	Illustrator, graphic designer, and educator	Brazil (Londrina)
4 May 2021	Subhadra Sen Gupta	68–69	Writer	India
4 May 2021	T. S. Shanbhag	84	Bookseller	India (Bangalore)
4 May 2021	Jorawar Ram	78	Politician	India
5 May 2021	Renuka Sharma	81	Film director	India (Bangalore)
5 May 2021	Ashraf Sehrai	77	Politician	India (Jammu)
5 May 2021	K. V. Thikkurissi	88	Writer and poet	India (Thiruvananthapuram)
5 May 2021	Vivek Yadav	36	Cricketer	India
5 May 2021	Thangjam Nandakishor Singh	64	Politician	India
6 May 2021	G. Anand	67	Singer	India
6 May 2021	Dal Bahadur Kori	64	Politician	India
6 May 2021	Paul Aulagnier	77	Priest	France (Périgueux)
6 May 2021	Basil Bhuriya	65	Bishop	India (Indore)
6 May 2021	Prateek Chaudhuri	49	Sitarist	India (Delhi)
6 May 2021	Daniele Cioni	62	Shooter	Italy (Campi Bisenzio)
6 May 2021	Comagan	48	Singer, composer, and actor	India
6 May 2021	Carlos Timoteo Griguol	84	Footballer and manager	Argentina (Buenos Aires)
6 May 2021	Shamim Hanafi	82	Dramatist and literary critic	India (New Delhi)
6 May 2021	Vanya Kostova	64	Singer	Bulgaria (Sofia)
6 May 2021	Bhaskar Maiya	70	Author, scholar, and translator	India (Udupi)
6 May 2021	G. Muniratnam	85	Social worker	India
6 May 2021	Pandu	74	Actor and comedian	India (Chennai)
6 May 2021	Sumbul Shahid	66–67	Actress	Pakistan (Lahore)
6 May 2021	Ajit Singh	82	Politician	India (Gurgaon)
6 May 2021	Matang Sinh	58	Politician	India
7 May 2021	Ananda Gopal Bandopadhyay	79	Tabla player	India (Kolkata)
7 May 2021	M. Y. Eqbal	70	Judge	India (Gurgaon)
7 May 2021	Vinod Kumar Singh	57	Politician	India
7 May 2021	Ram Sajan Pandey	64	Politician	India (Rohtak)
7 May 2021	Gamal Salama	75	Songwriter and melodist	Egypt (Giza)
7 May 2021	Kalthoon Thilak	78	Actor	India (Chennai)
7 May 2021	Aisha Alhassan	61	Politician	Egypt (Cairo)
7 May 2021	Arif Guliyev	70	Actor	Azerbaijan (Baku)
8 May 2021	Tanveer Akhtar		Politician	India
8 May 2021	Theodore Katsanevas	74	Politician	Greece (Athens)
8 May 2021	Maharaj Krishan Kaushik	66	Field hockey player	India (New Delhi)
8 May 2021	Ravinder Pal Singh	60	Field hockey player	India (Lucknow)
9 May 2021	Miguel Lifschitz	65	Politician	Argentina (Rosario)
9 May 2021	Raghunath Mohapatra	78	Politician	India (Bhubaneswar)
9 May 2021	Nandivada Rathnasree	57	Astrophysicist	India
9 May 2021	K. B. Shanappa	82	Politician	India (Gulbarga)
9 May 2021	Meraj Uddin Mollah	75	Politician	Bangladesh (Dhaka)
9 May 2021	Bhavsinh Rathod	68	Politician	India (Ahmedabad)
10 May 2021	Sami Hasan Al Nash	64	Football manager	Yemen (Aden)
10 May 2021	Salem Chandrasekharan		Film producer	India
10 May 2021	Marc Daniëls	61	Comic book artist	Belgium (Jette)
10 May 2021	Cristopher Mansilla	30	Track and road cyclist	Chile (Puerto Natales)
10 May 2021	Rasa Singh Rawat	79	Politician	India (Ajmer)
10 May 2021	Joker Thulasi	71	Actor and comedian	India (Chennai)
10 May 2021	Fortunato Franco	64	Footballer	India
10 May 2021	Dennis Joseph	63	Film director	India (Ettumanoor)
11 May 2021	Madampu Kunjukuttan	79	Screenwriter and actor	India (Thrissur)
11 May 2021	Rashid Meer	70	Poet and editor	India (Vadodara)
11 May 2021	Vladislav Yegin	32	Ice hockey player	Russia
11 May 2021	Zemi Yenus	60	Autism advocate	Ethiopia
12 May 2021	Homen Borgohain	88	Journalist and novelist	India (Guwahati)
12 May 2021	Venugopal Chandrasekhar	63	Table tennis player	India (Chennai)
12 May 2021	Nick Downie	74	Journalist and soldier	South Africa
12 May 2021	Rajeev Karwal	58	Businessman	India
12 May 2021	Maran	48	Actor and singer	India (Chengalpattu)
12 May 2021	Higinio Vélez	73	Baseball manager	Cuba (Havana)
13 May 2021	Indu Jain	84	Publishing executive	India (New Delhi)
14 May 2021	R. L. Bhatia	100	Politician	India (Amritsar)
14 May 2021	Matheus Shikongo	70	Politician	Namibia
14 May 2021	Kanaka Murthy	78	Sculptor	India (Bengaluru)
14 May 2021	Bharat Dave	72	Film director	India (Ahmedabad)
14 May 2021	Jarnail Singh	47–48	Politician and journalist	India (Delhi)
15 May 2021	Charlie Jackson	85	American football player	United States (Paris)
15 May 2021	Sunil Jain	58	Journalist	India (New Delhi)
16 May 2021	Nadia Al-Iraqia	57	Actress	Egypt (Cairo)
16 May 2021	Anjan Bandyopadhyay	55	Television journalist	India (Kolkata)
16 May 2021	Rajendrasinh Jadeja	65	Cricketer and umpire	India (Rajkot)
16 May 2021	Chetan Karki	72	Film director	Nepal
16 May 2021	Al Taib Mustafa	76	Journalist and politician	Sudan (Khartoum)
16 May 2021	Rajeev Satav	46	Politician	India (Pune)
16 May 2021	Vijay Singh Yadav	67–68	Politician	India (Kankarbagh)
17 May 2021	K. K. Aggarwal	62	Physician and cardiologist	India (Delhi)
17 May 2021	Amarendra Mohanty	63	Composer and singer	India (Bhubaneswar)
17 May 2021	Héctor Silva	75	Rugby union player and coach	Argentina (La Plata)
17 May 2021	K. Thurairetnasingam	80	Politician	Sri Lanka (Kantale)
17 May 2021	Nitish Veera	45	Actor	India
17 May 2021	Vivek Raj Wangkhem	47	Politician	India
18 May 2021	Chaman Lal Gupta	87	Politician	India (Jammu)
18 May 2021	Vijay Kumar Kashyap	56	Politician	India (Gurgaon)
18 May 2021	Shivraj Singh Lodhi	78	Politician	India
18 May 2021	Yolanda Tortolero	57	Politician	Venezuela (San Felipe)
19 May 2021	Pablo Calucho	41	Journalist	Bolivia (Santa Cruz de la Sierra)
19 May 2021	David Anthony Kraft	68	Comic book writer	United States (Gainesville)
19 May 2021	Prasanta Mohapatra	47	Cricketer	India (Bhubaneswar)
19 May 2021	Jagannath Pahadia	89	Politician	India (Gurgaon)
19 May 2021	Tshoganetso Tongwane	65	Politician	South Africa
19 May 2021	Tatyana Protsenko	53	Actress	Russia (Moscow)
19 May 2021	Hyon Chol-hae	87	Politician	North Korea (Pyongyang)
20 May 2021	Samir Ghanem	84	Actor, singer, and comedian	Egypt (Giza)
20 May 2021	Irom Maipak	53	Cinematographer	India
20 May 2021	Sándor Puhl	65	Football referee	Hungary (Budapest)
20 May 2021	U. Visweswar Rao	74	Film director and screenwriter	India
20 May 2021	Tarannum Riyaz	60	Writer	India
20 May 2021	Rizuan Abdul Hamid		Politician	Malaysia (Kuala Lumpur)
21 May 2021	Sunderlal Bahuguna	94	Environmentalist	India (Rishikesh)
21 May 2021	Ajoy Dey	69	Politician	India (Kolkata)
21 May 2021	Richard R. Lavigne	80	Priest	United States (Greenfield)
21 May 2021	Rajkumar Keswani	70	Journalist	India (Bhopal)
21 May 2021	Rana Kharkongor	69	Singer	India
21 May 2021	Usman Mansoorpuri	76	Islamic scholar	India
21 May 2021	Dinesh Mohan	75	Engineer	India (New Delhi)
21 May 2021	Klemen Tinal	50	Politician	Indonesia (Jakarta)
21 May 2021	Babagouda Patil	76	Politician	India
22 May 2021	Syamsuddin Mahmud	86	Politician and economist	Indonesia (Banda Aceh)
22 May 2021	Cornelia Oberlander	99	Landscape architect	Canada (Vancouver)
22 May 2021	Y. C. Simhadri	80	Academic	India
23 May 2021	Srikumar Banerjee	75	Engineer	India
23 May 2021	Luiz Gonzaga Paes Landim	79	Politician	Brazil (Teresina)
23 May 2021	Shanti Pahadia	86	Politician	India
23 May 2021	Nina Shatskaya	81	Actress	Russia (Moscow)
24 May 2021	Cabo Almi	58	Politician	Brazil (Campo Grande)
24 May 2021	Najeeb Qahtan al-Shaabi	67–68	Politician	Yemen (Aden)
24 May 2021	John Davis	66	Singer	Germany (Nuremberg)
24 May 2021	Banira Giri	75	Poet	Nepal (Kathmandu)
24 May 2021	Jeetmal Khant	58	Politician	India (Udaipur)
24 May 2021	Aditya Shastri	57	Academic	India
25 May 2021	José Melitón Chávez	63	Bishop	Argentina (San Miguel de Tucumán)
25 May 2021	Ben Kruger	64	Actor and author	South Africa (Pretoria)
25 May 2021	Jai Srinivas		Singer	India (Hyderabad)
26 May 2021	Abdul Wahab Al-Dailami	82–83	Politician	Turkey (Istanbul)
26 May 2021	Arturo de Jesús Correa Toro	80	Bishop	Colombia (Pasto)
26 May 2021	Majendra Narzary	68	Politician	India (Guwahati)
26 May 2021	H. S. Doreswamy	103	Journalist	India (Bangalore)
27 May 2021	Shantiraj Khosla	54	Composer and singer	India (Cuttack)
27 May 2021	Mohan Raj Malla		Politician	Nepal
27 May 2021	Nelson Sargento	96	Composer and singer	Brazil (Rio de Janeiro)
27 May 2021	V. A. Dilshad	54	Cinematographer	India (Mumbai)
27 May 2021	Lorina Kamburova	29	Actress	Russia (Moscow)
27 May 2021	Jaime Lerner	83	Politician	Brazil (Curitiba)
27 May 2021	K. C. Yadav	84	Historian	India
28 May 2021	Resurreccion Acop	73	Politician and doctor	Philippines (San Juan)
28 May 2021	Barbara Ossenkopp	77–78	Dancer, actress and animal rights activist	Indonesia (Jakarta)
28 May 2021	Pragmulji III	85	Maharaja of Kutch	India (Bhuj)
29 May 2021	Munirathna Anandakrishnan	92	Civil engineer	India (Chennai)
29 May 2021	Leho Ram Boro	63	Politician	India (Guwahati)
29 May 2021	Venkat Subha		Actor, writer, and producer	India (Chennai)
30 May 2021	Harussani Zakaria	82	Islamic scholar	Malaysia (Ipoh)
30 May 2021	Baddegama Samitha Thero	68	Politician and monk	Sri Lanka (Matara)
30 May 2021	Mythili Sivaraman	81	Women's rights activist	India (Chennai)
30 May 2021	Gloria Álvez Mariño	78	LGBT rights activist	Uruguay (Montevideo)
30 May 2021	Sithole Mshudulu	71	Politician	South Africa
31 May 2021	Laxmikant Sharma	60	Politician	India (Bhopal)
31 May 2021	Hemendra Singh Banera	75	Politician	India (Jaipur)
1 June 2021	Silvio Francesconi	68	Footballer and manager	Italy (Massa)
1 June 2021	Hsing Yin Shean	62	Politician	Malaysia (Kota Kinabalu)
1 June 2021	Ujwal Thapa	44	Entrepreneur and political activist	Nepal (Lalitpur)
1 June 2021	Faizul Waheed	56	Scholar	India (Jammu)
1 June 2021	Mac Mathunjwa	72	Actor	South Africa (Tsakane)
2 June 2021	Linah Mohohlo	69	Banker	Botswana (Gaborone)
2 June 2021	G. Ramachandran	73	Film producer and actor	India (Chennai)
2 June 2021	Bijayshree Routray	67	Politician	India (Bhubaneswar)
2 June 2021	Yamazaki Tsutomu	74	Politician	Japan (Aomori)
3 June 2021	Lakshmi Nandan Bora	88	Writer	India (Guwahati)
4 June 2021	Roberto Depietri	55	Footballer	Argentina (Bahía Blanca)
4 June 2021	Loris Dominissini	59	Footballer and manager	Italy (San Vito al Tagliamento)
4 June 2021	Vadim Kapranov	81	Basketball player	Russia (Moscow)
4 June 2021	Antoninho	82	Footballer	Brazil (Ribeirão Preto)
5 June 2021	Bikram Keshari Barma	81	Politician	India (Bhubaneswar)
5 June 2021	Narinder Bragta	68	Politician	India (Chandigarh)
5 June 2021	Atal Bihari Panda	92	Actor	India
6 June 2021	Michel Host	83	Writer	France (Paris)
7 June 2021	Ali Akbar Mohtashamipur	73	Politician	Iran (Tehran)
7 June 2021	Dheeraj Verma	53	Comic book artist	India (Delhi)
8 June 2021	Sylvain Ducange	58	Bishop	Haiti (Mirebalais)
8 June 2021	Kamla Verma	93	Politician	India (Jagadhri)
9 June 2021	Abdul Latif Ibrahimi	62	Politician	Afghanistan (Kabul)
9 June 2021	Rabi Banerjee	70	Cricketer	India (Kolkata)
10 June 2021	Alexander	68	Archbishop	Azerbaijan (Baku)
10 June 2021	Fazlullah Mujadedi	63–64	Politician	Afghanistan
10 June 2021	Douglas Cagas	77	Politician and convicted murderer	Philippines (Digos)
10 June 2021	Willem Konjore	75	Politician	Namibia (Windhoek)
10 June 2021	Larisa Shoygu	68	Politician	Russia (Moscow)
10 June 2021	Dingko Singh	42	Boxer	India
11 June 2021	Taha Karaan	52	Islamic scholar	South Africa (Cape Town)
11 June 2021	Ashok Panagariya	71	Neurologist and medical researcher	India (Jaipur)
11 June 2021	Siddalingaiah	67	Poet and politician	India (Bangalore)
11 June 2021	Ivo Baldi Gaburri	74	Bishop	Peru (Huaraz)
11 June 2021	Surat Mathur	90	Runner	India (Delhi)
12 June 2021	Marco Maciel	80	Politician	Brazil (Brasília)
12 June 2021	Jesús Martín-Barbero	83	Scientist	Colombia (Cali)
12 June 2021	Igor Zhelezovski	57	Skater	Belarus (Minsk)
13 June 2021	Hryhorii Chapkis	91	Dancer and choreographer	Ukraine (Kyiv)
13 June 2021	Nirmal Saini	82	Volleyball player	India (Mohali)
13 June 2021	Indira Hridayesh	80	Politician	India (Delhi)
13 June 2021	Dan Montsitsi	69	Politician	South Africa
14 June 2021	Mburumba Kerina	89	Politician	Namibia (Windhoek)
15 June 2021	Paul Alois Lakra	65	Bishop	India (Ranchi)
15 June 2021	Benon Magezi	60	Bishop	Uganda (Kampala)
15 June 2021	James Jim Skosana	59	Politician	South Africa
15 June 2021	Ari Magalhães	81	Politician	Brazil (São Paulo)
15 June 2021	Bhekiziziwe Peterson	60	Writer	South Africa
16 June 2021	Jabu Mabuza	63	Businessman	South Africa
16 June 2021	John Osmers	86	Bishop	Zambia (Lusaka)
16 June 2021	Joel Otim	49	Athlete	Uganda (Kampala)
16 June 2021	Chou Ching-chun	77	Social activist	Taiwan (Taipei)
16 June 2021	A. Santha Kumar	52	Screenwriter	India
17 June 2021	Shaman Mithru	43	Cinematographer and actor	India (Chennai)
17 June 2021	John Mutwa	60	Military officer	Namibia (Katima Mulilo)
18 June 2021	Rodrigo Munilla	44	Journalist	Argentina (Buenos Aires)
18 June 2021	S. Ramesan Nair	73	Poet and lyricist	India (Ernakulam)
18 June 2021	Vekuii Rukoro	66	Tribal leader and politician	Namibia (Windhoek)
18 June 2021	Milkha Singh	91	Athlete	India (Chandigarh)
19 June 2021	Jayanta Naskar	73	Politician	India (Kolkata)
19 June 2021	Tapu Mishra	36	Singer	India (Bhubaneswar)
19 June 2021	Guruprasad Mohapatra	59	Civil servant	India
19 June 2021	Armin Franulic	77	Rally driver	Bolivia
19 June 2021	Roger Mpanano	58	Politician	Democratic Republic of the Congo (Kinshasa)
20 June 2021	Alex Hesegem	63	Politician	Indonesia (Jayapura)
20 June 2021	Anatoly Lysenko	84	Film director	Russia (Moscow)
20 June 2021	Waldir Lucas Pereira	39	Footballer	Brazil (Campinas)
21 June 2021	Oleg Burlakov	71	Businessman and inventor	Russia (Moscow)
21 June 2021	Haribhushan		Politician and guerrilla	India
21 June 2021	Reshma	42	Actress	India
21 June 2021	Hatiro Shimomoto	85	Politician	Brazil (São Paulo)
22 June 2021	Horacio González	77	Academic and essayist	Argentina (Buenos Aires)
22 June 2021	Poovachal Khader	72	Lyricist	India (Thiruvananthapuram)
23 June 2021	Melissa Coates	52	Professional wrestler and model	United States (Las Vegas)
23 June 2021	Ramón Romero Roa	55	Politician	Paraguay (Asunción)
23 June 2021	Yuriy Sevenard	85	Politician	Russia (Moscow)
23 June 2021	René Sylvestre	58	Judge	Haiti (Mirebalais)
23 June 2021	Daniel Vélez	47	Footballer	Colombia (Medellín)
23 June 2021	Ngarikutuke Tjiriange	77	Politician	Namibia
24 June 2021	Brian Baker	47	Politician	United States (Kansas City)
24 June 2021	Hind Shalabi	69	Academic	Tunisia
25 June 2021	Marcos Ferrufino	58	Footballer	Bolivia (Oruro)
25 June 2021	Ahmed Bilal Shah	67	Doctor and television personality	Zimbabwe (Harare)
25 June 2021	Luis Cáceres Velásquez	90	Politician	Peru (Arequipa)
26 June 2021	John Mario Ramírez	50	Footballer	Colombia (Tunja)
28 June 2021	Sergio Víctor Palma	65	Boxer	Argentina (Mar del Plata)
29 June 2021	Dalenda Abdou	92	Actress	Tunisia (Tunis)
29 June 2021	Goolam Rajah	74	Cricket manager and pharmacist	South Africa (Johannesburg)
29 June 2021	Carlos Vilar	91	Sailor	Argentina (Buenos Aires)
29 June 2021	César Virguetti	66	Politician	Bolivia (Cochabamba)
29 June 2021	John Baptist Mukasa	54	Doctor	Uganda
30 June 2021	Richard Dolley	61	Cricketer and hockey administrator	South Africa
30 June 2021	Sharad Tripathi	49	Politician	India (Gurgaon)
1 July 2021	Yury Dokhoian	56	Chess player	Russia (Moscow)
1 July 2021	Noble Banadda	46	Engineer	Uganda (Kampala)
1 July 2021	Steve Kekana	62	Singer	South Africa (Johannesburg)
1 July 2021	Farida Mansurova	69	Doctor	Tajikistan
1 July 2021	Mutodi Neshehe	45	Actor	South Africa (Soweto)
1 July 2021	Sanghamitra Mohanty	68	Computer scientist	India (Bhubaneswar)
2 July 2021	Mohamed Nejib Berriche		Politician	Tunisia
2 July 2021	Kōbō Kenichi	47	Sumo wrestler	Japan (Nagoya)
2 July 2021	Lehlo Ledwaba	49	Boxer	South Africa
2 July 2021	Manteb Soedharsono	72	Puppeteer	Indonesia
2 July 2021	B. M. Senguttuvan	81	Politician	India
2 July 2021	Lucky Richter	57	Footballer	Namibia
3 July 2021	Nikolay Konstantinov	89	Mathematician	Russia (Moscow)
3 July 2021	John Siffy Mirin	42	Politician	Indonesia (Jakarta)
3 July 2021	Roberto Rodríguez	84	Bishop	Argentina (Jesús María)
3 July 2021	Rachmawati Sukarnoputri	70	Politician	Indonesia (Jakarta)
3 July 2021	Nigel Brouwers	44	Cricketer	South Africa (Gqeberha)
4 July 2021	Burhan Abdurahman	64	Politician	Indonesia (Makassar)
4 July 2021	Samuel Ankama	41	Politician	Namibia (Ongwediva)
4 July 2021	Sanford Clark	85	Rockabilly singer	United States (Joplin)
4 July 2021	Abebech Gobena	83	Humanitarian	Ethiopia (Addis Ababa)
4 July 2021	Harmoko	82	Politician	Indonesia (Jakarta)
4 July 2021	Adang Sudrajat	58	Politician	Indonesia (Bandung)
4 July 2021	Fazal-e-Khuda	80	Poet	Bangladesh (Dhaka)
5 July 2021	Aggrey Awori	82	Politician	Uganda (Naalya)
5 July 2021	Vladimir Menshov	81	Actor and film director	Russia (Moscow)
5 July 2021	Stan Swamy	84	Jesuit priest	India (Mumbai)
6 July 2021	Nikolai Reznichenko	69	Military officer	Russia
6 July 2021	Betty Mpeka	67	Doctor	Uganda (Kampala)
7 July 2021	Cameron Mackenzie	60	Politician	South Africa (Fourways)
7 July 2021	Storey Morutoa	82	Politician	South Africa
7 July 2021	Jose Jaime Espina	59	Journalist	Philippines (Bacolod)
8 July 2021	Hossam Mohammed Amin	71	Military officer	United Arab Emirates
8 July 2021	Virbhadra Singh	87	Politician	India (Shimla)
8 July 2021	Rachhpal Singh	78	Politician	India
9 July 2021	Geoff Makhubo	53	Politician	South Africa (Johannesburg)
10 July 2021	Homen D' Wai	50–51	Film director	India
10 July 2021	P. K. Warrier	100	Doctor	India (Kottakkal)
10 July 2021	Abe Nkomo	81	Politician	South Africa (Pretoria)
11 July 2021	Eka Supria Atmaja	48	Politician	Indonesia (Kelapa Dua)
12 July 2021	Ben Ngubane	79	Politician	South Africa
12 July 2021	Paulose II	74	Bishop	India
12 July 2021	Lesego Semenya	39	Chef	South Africa
13 July 2021	Kumutha Rahman	42	Politician	Malaysia (Putrajaya)
13 July 2021	Martha Chanjo Lunji		Politician	Malawi (Lilongwe)
13 July 2021	Alexander Stefanovich	76	Film director	Russia (Moscow)
13 July 2021	Sandra Nyaira		Journalist	Zimbabwe
14 July 2021	Helen Lieros	81	Artist	Zimbabwe
15 July 2021	Kä Mana	67	Philosopher	Democratic Republic of the Congo (Goma)
15 July 2021	Pyotr Mamonov	70	Guitarist	Russia (Moscow)
15 July 2021	Sugiharto	66	Politician	Indonesia (Jakarta)
16 July 2021	Rajib Ghosh	59	Journalist	India (Kolkata)
16 July 2021	Joyce Maluleke	60	Politician	South Africa
16 July 2021	Harry M. Rosenfeld	91	Journalist	United States (Slingerlands)
17 July 2021	Khurram Khan Chowdhury	75	Politician	Bangladesh (Dhaka)
17 July 2021	Graham Vick	67	Opera director	United Kingdom (London)
18 July 2021	Afaz Uddin Ahmed	95	Politician	Bangladesh (Dhaka)
19 July 2021	Emilio Mario Osmeña	82	Politician	Philippines (Cebu City)
19 July 2021	Mohammed Sabila	79	Writer and philosopher	Morocco (Rabat)
19 July 2021	Hans Booys	71	Politician	Namibia
20 July 2021	Theo Jubitana	56	Politician	Suriname (Paramaribo)
20 July 2021	Nyan Win	78	Politician	Myanmar (Yangon)
20 July 2021	Noureddine Saâdi	71	Football manager	Algeria (Algiers)
20 July 2021	San Win	73	Historian	Myanmar
21 July 2021	Lieb Bester	72	Actor and singer	South Africa (Pretoria)
21 July 2021	Aleksandr Aleksandrovich Smirnov	63	Politician	Russia (Kislovodsk)
21 July 2021	Ambrish Kumar		Politician	India
22 July 2021	Vladimir Bogdashin	69	Military officer	Russia (Moscow)
22 July 2021	Boris Chochiev	66	Politician	Russia (Vladikavkaz)
22 July 2021	John Hsane Hgyi	67	Bishop	Myanmar (Pathein)
22 July 2021	Ian Palmer	55	Football manager	South Africa
22 July 2021	Saw Mo Shay	63	Military officer	Myanmar (Yangon)
22 July 2021	Andre Thysse	52	Boxer	South Africa
22 July 2021	Hikmat Singh Verma	65	Politician	Fiji (Suva)
22 July 2021	Christianto Wibisono	76	Businessman	Indonesia (Jakarta)
23 July 2021	Fakir Alamgir	71	Singer	Bangladesh (Dhaka)
23 July 2021	Jimmy Demianus Ijie	53	Politician	Indonesia
23 July 2021	Tito Lupini	65	Rugby coach	South Africa (Johannesburg)
23 July 2021	Lulama Ntshayisa	62	Politician	South Africa
23 July 2021	Wally Gonzalez	71	Guitarist	Philippines (Parañaque)
24 July 2021	Yevgeni Pupkov	45	Ice hockey player	Kazakhstan
24 July 2021	Zedekia Ngavirue	88	Diplomat	Namibia (Windhoek)
24 July 2021	Sam Domoni	52	Rugby union player	Fiji
24 July 2021	Rubén Martínez Puente	80	Military officer	Cuba
25 July 2021	R. Rajamahendran	78	Businessman	Sri Lanka (Colombo)
25 July 2021	Joseph Laban	40	Journalist	Philippines
26 July 2021	René Juárez Cisneros	65	Politician	Mexico (Mexico City)
26 July 2021	Natty Hollmann	83	Philanthropist and humanitarian	Argentina (Bahía Blanca)
26 July 2021	Myoma Myint Kywe	61	Writer	Myanmar
28 July 2021	Porfirio Armando Betancourt	63	Footballer	Honduras (San Pedro Sula)
28 July 2021	Shahram Kashani	47	Singer	Turkey (Istanbul)
28 July 2021	Gacha Plienwithi	95	Actor	Thailand (Uthai Thani)
28 July 2021	Sergo Sutyagin	84	Architect	Uzbekistan (Tashkent)
29 July 2021	Geraldo Francisco dos Santos	59	Footballer	United States (Los Angeles)
29 July 2021	Tomasi Takau	52	Rugby union player	United States (St. George)
29 July 2021	Min Yu Wai	92	Writer	Myanmar
30 July 2021	Jacob Desvarieux	65	Singer and producer	France (Pointe-à-Pitre)
30 July 2021	Shona Ferguson	47	Actor and producer	South Africa (Johannesburg)
30 July 2021	Manuel Morato	87	Politician and television host	Philippines (Quezon City)
30 July 2021	Veno Kauaria	60	Politician	Namibia (Windhoek)
30 July 2021	Martha Sánchez Néstor	47	Human and women's rights activist	Mexico
30 July 2021	Johan van Zyl	63	Businessman	South Africa (Pretoria)
31 July 2021	Alvin Ing	89	Actor and singer	United States (Burbank)
31 July 2021	Jean-Claude Kazembe Musonda	58	Politician	Democratic Republic of the Congo (Lubumbashi)
31 July 2021	Chin Sian Thang	83	Politician	Myanmar
31 July 2021	Jacobus Frederick van Wyk	68	Politician	South Africa (Steinkopf)
1 August 2021	Omar Jazouli	75	Politician	Morocco (Marrakesh)
1 August 2021	Gino Renni	78	Actor	Argentina (Buenos Aires)
3 August 2021	Noel Guzmán Boffil Rojas	66	Painter	Cuba (Santa Clara)
3 August 2021	María Teresa Marú Mejía	62	Politician	Mexico (Mexico City)
3 August 2021	Kazem Mohammadi	47	Futsal player	Iran (Karaj)
3 August 2021	Nader Shariatmadari	61	Politician	Iran
3 August 2021	Gholam Hosein Shiri Aliabad	60	Politician	Iran (Tehran)
3 August 2021	Khin Maung Win	80	Writer	Myanmar
4 August 2021	Zelá Brambillé	27	Novelist	Mexico (Saltillo)
4 August 2021	Dick Farrel	65	Radio broadcaster	United States (West Palm Beach)
4 August 2021	Paul Johnson	50	DJ	United States (Evergreen Park)
4 August 2021	J. R. Richard	71	Baseball player	United States (Houston)
4 August 2021	Moisés Torres	71–72	Politician	Bolivia (Sucre)
5 August 2021	Yevhen Marchuk	80	Politician	Ukraine (Kyiv)
5 August 2021	Jane Ngwenya	86	Politician	Zimbabwe (Bulawayo)
6 August 2021	Tigor Silaban	68	Doctor	Indonesia (Jayapura)
7 August 2021	Dalal Abdel Aziz	61	Actress	Egypt (Mohandiseen)
7 August 2021	Robert Martin Gumbura	66	Preacher and convicted rapist	Zimbabwe (Harare)
7 August 2021	Mohammad Hadis Uddin	80	Police officer	Bangladesh (Dhaka)
8 August 2021	Najma Chowdhury	79	Academic	Bangladesh (Dhaka)
8 August 2021	Fernando López de Olmedo		Military officer	Spain (Madrid)
8 August 2021	Michael Goreseb	66	Politician	Namibia (Windhoek)
9 August 2021	Viktor Likhonosov	85	Writer	Russia (Krasnodar)
9 August 2021	Craig Ogletree	53	American football player	United States
9 August 2021	Siti Sarah	36	Singer and actress	Malaysia (Kuala Lumpur)
9 August 2021	Chucky Thompson	53	Music producer	United States (Los Angeles)
9 August 2021	Saranya Sasi	35	Actress	India (Thiruvananthapuram)
9 August 2021	Ary Ribeiro Valadão	102	Politician	Brazil (Goiânia)
10 August 2021	Júlio Chaves	76	Voice actor	Brazil (Rio de Janeiro)
10 August 2021	Samuel Marful-Sau	64	Judge	Ghana
11 August 2021	Rejoice Timire	62	Politician	Zimbabwe (Harare)
12 August 2021	Durdana Butt	76	Actress	Pakistan (Karachi)
12 August 2021	Tarcísio Meira	85	Actor	Brazil (São Paulo)
12 August 2021	Hadiza Shagari	80	First Lady of Nigeria	Nigeria (Abuja)
12 August 2021	João Lyra	90	Politician	Brazil (Maceió)
12 August 2021	Haydée Coloso-Espino	83	Swimmer	Philippines (Iloilo City)
13 August 2021	Alejandro Guzmán Brito	76	Jurist	Chile (Valparaíso)
13 August 2021	Henryk Hoser	78	Bishop	Poland (Warsaw)
13 August 2021	Alia Muhammad Baker	68–69	Librarian	Iraq (Basra)
13 August 2021	Keitumetse Paul	48	Footballer	Botswana
14 August 2021	Ibrahim Kalil Konaté	44	Politician	Guinea (Conakry)
14 August 2021	Boonruen Choonhavan	101	First Lady of Thailand	Thailand (Bangkok)
15 August 2021	Abdur Rahim	68	Military officer	Bangladesh (Dhaka)
15 August 2021	Usmankhan Alimov	71	Imam	Russia (Moscow)
16 August 2021	Simão Sessim	85	Politician	Brazil (Rio de Janeiro)
16 August 2021	Lucille Times	100	Civil rights activist	United States (Montgomery)
16 August 2021	Duda Mendonça	77	Publicist	Brazil (São Paulo)
17 August 2021	Kazenambo Kazenambo	58	Politician	Namibia (Windhoek)
17 August 2021	Ibrahim Mantu	74	Politician	Nigeria
17 August 2021	Basil Mramba	81	Politician	Tanzania
17 August 2021	Saul Soliz	55	Martial artist	United States (Houston)
17 August 2021	Fereshteh Taerpour	68	Film producer	Iran (Tehran)
18 August 2021	Evgeny Sveshnikov	71	Chess player and writer	Russia
18 August 2021	Temur Tugushi	49	Footballer	Georgia (Tbilisi)
19 August 2021	Sonny Chiba	82	Actor and martial artist	Japan (Kimitsu)
20 August 2021	Mark Hamister	69	Businessman	United States (Buffalo)
20 August 2021	Brent Yonts	72	Politician	United States (Owensboro)
21 August 2021	Phil Valentine	61	Radio broadcaster	United States (Nashville)
21 August 2021	Gabriel Kyungu wa Kumwanza	82	Politician	Angola (Luanda)
21 August 2021	Budi Darma	84	Writer	Indonesia (Surabaya)
22 August 2021	Danton Barto	50	American football player	United States
22 August 2021	Eric Wagner	62	Heavy metal singer	United States (Las Vegas)
22 August 2021	Jack Hirschman	87	Poet	United States (San Francisco)
23 August 2021	Brick Bronsky	57	Wrestler and actor	United States (Allentown)
23 August 2021	Mamadouba Toto Camara		Politician	Guinea
23 August 2021	Yusuf Grillo	86	Painter	Nigeria
23 August 2021	Giovanni Pretorius	49	Boxer	South Africa (Alberton)
23 August 2021	Victoria Aguiyi-Ironsi	97	First Lady of Nigeria	Nigeria
24 August 2021	Olabiyi Durojaiye	88	Politician	Nigeria (Lagos)
24 August 2021	Hissène Habré	79	Politician and convicted war criminal	Senegal (Dakar)
24 August 2021	Mangala Samaraweera	65	Politician	Sri Lanka (Colombo)
25 August 2021	Milan Gutović	75	Actor	Serbia (Belgrade)
25 August 2021	Sub]hankar Banerjee	55	Tabla player	India (Kolkata)
25 August 2021	Mario Guilloti	75	Boxer	Argentina (Avellaneda)
26 August 2021	Kenny Malone	83	Percussionist	United States (Nashville)
26 August 2021	Vladimir Shadrin	73	Ice hockey player	Russia (Moscow)
26 August 2021	Marco Hausiku	67	Politician	Namibia
27 August 2021	Rubina Saigol	68	Scholar	Pakistan
28 August 2021	Ahmad Sarji Abdul Hamid	82	Politician	Malaysia (Kuala Lumpur)
28 August 2021	Alioune Badara Cissé	63	Politician	Senegal (Dakar)
28 August 2021	Nasrul Abit	66	Politician	Indonesia (Padang)
28 August 2021	Giraldo González	63	Baseball player	Cuba
28 August 2021	Somsak Jaikaew	62	Politician	Thailand
29 August 2021	Lajim Ukin	66	Politician	Malaysia (Kota Kinabalu)
29 August 2021	Tudor Gunasekara	86	Politician and diplomat	Sri Lanka (Colombo)
29 August 2021	Buddhadeb Guha	85	Lawyer	India (Kolkata)
29 August 2021	Barthélémy Attisso	76	Writer	Togo
29 August 2021	Muhammad Hamza	92	Politician	Pakistan
30 August 2021	Sakaran Dandai	91	Politician	Malaysia (Kota Kinabalu)
30 August 2021	Maggie Mae	61	Singer	United States (Melbourne)
30 August 2021	Messaoud Nedjahi	67	Writer	France (Paris)
30 August 2021	Robert David Steele	69	Intelligence officer and conspiracy theorist	United States (Florida)
31 August 2021	Mahal	46	Actress	Philippines (Tanauan)
31 August 2021	Francisco Monterrosa	52	Artist	Mexico (Juchitán de Zaragoza)
1 September 2021	Adalberto Álvarez	72	Pianist	Cuba (Havana)
1 September 2021	Carol Fran	87	Singer, pianist, and songwriter	United States (Lafayette)
1 September 2021	Jim Fuller	76	American football player and coach	United States (Keller)
1 September 2021	Doug Green	66	Politician	United States (Ohio)
1 September 2021	Dan Swecker	74	Politician	United States (Rochester)
1 September 2021	Norberto Mario Oyarbide	70	Judge	Argentina (Buenos Aires)
1 September 2021	Hopong Koyinlay	47	Monk	Myanmar
1 September 2021	Chandan Mitra	65	Politician	India (Delhi)
1 September 2021	Anna Cataldi	81	Journalist	Italy
2 September 2021	Efren Arroyo	68	Television journalist	Puerto Rico (San Juan)
2 September 2021	Aydin Ibrahimov	83	Wrestler	Azerbaijan (Baku)
2 September 2021	Gurbanmuhammet Kasymow	68	Politician and diplomat	Turkmenistan (Ashgabat)
2 September 2021	Steve Lawler	56	Wrestler	United States (Florida)
2 September 2021	Hashibur Rahman Swapon	67	Politician	Turkey (Istanbul)
2 September 2021	Josephine Medina	51	Table tennis player	Philippines
3 September 2021	Hassan Firouzabadi	70	Military officer	Iran (Tehran)
3 September 2021	Enrique Molina	77	Actor	Cuba (Havana)
3 September 2021	John Watkins	98	Cricketer	South Africa (Durban)
5 September 2021	Tony Selby	83	Actor	United Kingdom (London)
6 September 2021	Zanele kaMagwaza-Msibi	59	Politician	South Africa (Durban)
6 September 2021	Sunil Perera	68	Singer	Sri Lanka (Colombo)
6 September 2021	Frank Russell	72	Basketball player	United States (Pontiac)
6 September 2021	Anthony Ukpo	74	Politician	Nigeria
7 September 2021	Thanwa Raseetanu	50	Singer	Thailand (Bangkok)
7 September 2021	Ameer Zaman	65	Politician	Pakistan
8 September 2021	Abbas Ansarifard	65	Businessman	Iran
8 September 2021	Juan Guillermo López Soto	74	Bishop	Mexico (Chihuahua City)
8 September 2021	Igor Shklyarevsky	83	Poet	Russia (Moscow)
8 September 2021	Edward Barnes	94	Television producer	United Kingdom (London)
8 September 2021	Amy Hawkins	110	Dancer	United Kingdom (Monmouth)
9 September 2021	Tarcísio Padilha	93	Philosopher	Brazil (Rio de Janeiro)
9 September 2021	Richard McGeagh	77	Swimmer	United States (Nashville)
9 September 2021	Marian Duś	83	Bishop	Poland (Warsaw)
10 September 2021	Charles Konan Banny	78	Politician	France (Neuilly-sur-Seine)
10 September 2021	Syntar Klas Sunn	62	Politician	India
10 September 2021	André Zacharow	82	Politician	Brazil (Curitiba)
12 September 2021	Bernardino Cano Radil	65	Diplomat and politician	Cuba (Havana)
12 September 2021	Bob Enyart	62	Radio host and pastor	United States (Denver)
12 September 2021	Andreas Herczog	74	Politician	Switzerland (Liestal)
13 September 2021	Borisav Jović	92	Politician	Serbia (Belgrade)
13 September 2021	Rizabawa	54	Actor	India (Kochi)
14 September 2021	Dave Jenks	78	Author	United States
15 September 2021	Fernando Mario Chávez Ruvalcaba	89	Bishop	Mexico (Zacatecas City)
16 September 2021	Casimir Oyé-Mba	79	Politician	France (Paris)
19 September 2021	Marina Tucaković	67	Singer	Serbia (Belgrade)
19 September 2021	Obadiah Mailafia	64	Economist	Nigeria (Abuja)
19 September 2021	Dinky Soliman	68	Politician	Philippines (Quezon City)
20 September 2021	Colin Bailey	87	Drummer	United States (Port Hueneme)
21 September 2021	Grey Gowrie, 2nd Earl of Gowrie	81	Peer and politician	United Kingdom (Llanfechain)
22 September 2021	Eric Alfasi	49	Basketball player and coach	Israel (Tel Aviv)
22 September 2021	Abdelkader Bensalah	79	Politician	Algeria (Algiers)
22 September 2021	Colin Jones	85	Photographer	United Kingdom
22 September 2021	Nenad Nenadović	56	Actor and television host	Serbia (Belgrade)
22 September 2021	Eliyantha White	48	Spiritual healer	Sri Lanka (Colombo)
23 September 2021	Jorge Liberato Urosa Savino	79	Cardinal	Venezuela (Caracas)
25 September 2021	Swapan Kumar Chakravorty	67	Author and academic	India (Kolkata)
25 September 2021	Carlos Neder	67	Politician and physician	Brazil (São Paulo)
25 September 2021	Sergei Shuvalov	70	Politician	Russia (Saratov)
25 September 2021	Sheila Bhalla	88	Economist	India
26 September 2021	Siamak Atlasi	85	Actor	Iran (Tehran)
26 September 2021	José Freire Falcão	95	Cardinal	Brazil (Brasília)
26 September 2021	Rewat Sirinukul	85	Politician	Thailand
27 September 2021	Ibrahim Mbombo Njoya	83	Politician and royal	France (Paris)
27 September 2021	B. B. Dutta	83	Politician	India
28 September 2021	Phi Nhung	51	Singer and actress	Vietnam (Ho Chi Minh City)
28 September 2021	Stephen Thega	75	Boxer	Kenya (Nairobi)
29 September 2021	Hayko	48	Singer	Armenia (Yerevan)
29 September 2021	Lee Vernon McNeill	56	Sprinter	United States (Fayetteville)
29 September 2021	Julia Nixon	66	Singer	United States (Raleigh)
30 September 2021	Donna Nalewaja	81	Politician	United States (Fargo)
1 October 2021	Oğuzhan Asiltürk	86	Politician	Turkey (Ankara)
1 October 2021	William Izarra	74	Politician and diplomat	Venezuela (Caracas)
1 October 2021	Andreas Neocleous	82	Lawyer and politician	Cyprus (Nicosia)
2 October 2021	Ziauddin Ahmed Bablu	66	Politician	Bangladesh (Dhaka)
2 October 2021	Anil Basu	74	Politician	India (Kolkata)
3 October 2021	Samantha Epasinghe	54	Actress	Sri Lanka (Horana)
3 October 2021	Marc Pilcher	53	Makeup artist	United Kingdom (London)
4 October 2021	Peter Jenkins	77	Politician	Canada (Vancouver)
5 October 2021	Zoran Stanković	66	Politician	Serbia (Belgrade)
5 October 2021	Abdulazeez Ibrahim	63	Politician	Nigeria
5 October 2021	Fathali Oveisi	75	Actor	Iran (Tehran)
6 October 2021	Oleg Seleznyov	62	Politician	Russia (Krasnodar)
6 October 2021	Yesudasan	83	Cartoonist	India (Kochi)
7 October 2021	Mel Boehland	78	American football coach	United States (Saint Paul)
7 October 2021	Reggie Parks	87	Professional wrestler and engraver	United States (Tucson)
9 October 2021	Chito Gascon	57	Lawyer	Philippines
9 October 2021	Sikandar Hayat Khan	87	Politician	Pakistan (Poonch)
10 October 2021	Abdul Qadeer Khan	85	Nuclear physicist	Pakistan (Islamabad)
10 October 2021	Fandas Safiullin	85	Politician	Russia (Kazan)
11 October 2021	Ockert Potgieter	55	Missionary and film director	South Africa (Mossel Bay)
11 October 2021	Nedumudi Venu	73	Actor	India (Thiruvananthapuram)
12 October 2021	Raúl Baduel	66	Military officer and politician	Venezuela (Caracas)
12 October 2021	Ricarlo Flanagan	41	Actor and comedian	United States (Los Angeles)
12 October 2021	Renton Laidlaw	82	Golf broadcaster and journalist	United Kingdom (Dundee)
13 October 2021	Conrado Miranda	92	Footballer and manager	El Salvador (San Salvador)
14 October 2021	Marko Živić	49	Actor and television host	Serbia (Belgrade)
14 October 2021	Vic Sison	84	Footballer	Philippines
14 October 2021	Ojārs Ēriks Kalniņš	71	Politician	Latvia (Riga)
14 October 2021	Phil Leadbetter	59	Guitarist	United States (Knoxville)
15 October 2021	Georgi Vanyan	58	Activist	Georgia (Tbilisi)
18 October 2021	Colin Powell	84	Politician, diplomat, and military officer	United States (Bethesda)
19 October 2021	Branko Mamula	100	Military officer and politician	Montenegro (Tivat)
20 October 2021	Dave Harper	55	American football player	United States (Templeton)
20 October 2021	Michael Laughlin	82	Film director, producer, and writer	United States (Honolulu)
20 October 2021	Dragan Pantelić	69	Footballer	Serbia (Niš)
21 October 2021	Gurie Georgiu	52	Bishop	Romania (Deva)
21 October 2021	Tigran Karapetyan	76	Politician	Armenia (Yerevan)
22 October 2021	Irshat Fakhritdinov	56	Politician	Russia (Ufa)
22 October 2021	Serhiy Morozov	71	Footballer and manager	Ukraine (Kyiv)
23 October 2021	Valentyna Rakytianska	73	Librarian	Ukraine (Kharkiv)
25 October 2021	Sudi Silalahi	72	Politician	Indonesia (Jakarta)
25 October 2021	Fernando Herrera Mamani	55	Politician	Peru (Lima)
26 October 2021	Guan Dee Koh Hoi	67	Politician	Malaysia (Kuala Lumpur)
26 October 2021	Nawaf Massalha	77	Politician	Israel
26 October 2021	Đuro Perić	91	Politician	Serbia (Batajnica)
27 October 2021	Salem Nanjundaiah Subba Rao	92	Social worker	India (Jaipur)
28 October 2021	Olena Lytovchenko	58	Writer	Ukraine (Kyiv)
28 October 2021	Victor V. Zhenchenko	85	Poet	Ukraine (Kyiv)
29 October 2021	Geraldo Brindeiro	73	Jurist and lawyer	Brazil (Brasília)
29 October 2021	Iran Darroudi	85	Artist	Iran (Tehran)
29 October 2021	Clément Mouamba	77	Politician	France (Paris)
30 October 2021	Igor Kirillov	89	News anchor	Russia (Moscow)
30 October 2021	Holger Obermann	85	Footballer and journalist	Germany (Friedrichsdorf)
31 October 2021	James Jemut Masing	72	Politician	Malaysia (Kuching)
31 October 2021	Luigi Reitani	62	Literary scholar and translator	Germany (Berlin)
2 November 2021	Irene Lalji		Lawyer	Suriname
4 November 2021	Barbara-Rose Collins	82	Politician	United States (Detroit)
4 November 2021	Devwrat Singh	52	Politician	India (Khairagarh)
4 November 2021	Vitalii Malakhov	67	Theatre director	Ukraine (Kyiv)
5 November 2021	Andris Kolbergs	82	Writer	Latvia (Riga)
6 November 2021	Kambiz Derambakhsh	79	Graphic designer	Iran (Tehran)
6 November 2021	Yukhym Zvyahilsky	88	Politician	Ukraine (Kyiv)
7 November 2021	Liudmila Belavenets	81	Chess player	Russia (Moscow)
7 November 2021	Vadim Morozov	67	Politician	Russia (Moscow)
7 November 2021	Sergei Shmatko	55	Politician	Russia (Moscow)
9 November 2021	Iris Rezende	87	Politician	Brazil (São Paulo)
11 November 2021	Aga Mikolaj	50	Operatic singer	Poland (Warsaw)
12 November 2021	Paul Gludovatz	75	Football manager	Austria
12 November 2021	Wasfi Kabha	62	Politician	State of Palestine (Barta'a)
13 November 2021	Dragoș Petre Dumitriu	57	Politician and journalist	Romania
15 November 2021	Osman Öcalan	63	Militant and politician	Iraq (Erbil)
17 November 2021	Abdul Ghafar Atan	65	Politician	Malaysia (Malacca City)
17 November 2021	Leonid Bartenyev	88	Athlete	Russia
17 November 2021	Ken Colvin	82	Footballer	Australia (Echuca)
17 November 2021	Gilbert Dragon	52	Police chief and guerilla commander	Haiti
17 November 2021	R. N. R. Manohar	54	Film director and actor	India (Chennai)
18 November 2021	İmran Kılıç	64	Politician	Turkey (Ankara)
18 November 2021	Dzyanis Kowba	42	Footballer	Russia (Moscow)
18 November 2021	Ardeshir Zahedi	93	Politician	Switzerland (Montreux)
18 November 2021	Liu Huaqiu	82	Politician	China (Beijing)
19 November 2021	Josée Forest-Niesing	56	Politician	Canada (Sudbury)
19 November 2021	Ricky Nelson	62	Baseball player	United States (Phoenix)
20 November 2021	Valery Garkalin	67	Actor	Russia (Moscow)
21 November 2021	Asongo Alalaparu	79	Traditional leader	Suriname (Lelydorp)
21 November 2021	Marietta Chudakova	84	Literary critic	Russia (Moscow)
21 November 2021	Nina Ruslanova	75	Actress	Russia (Moscow)
21 November 2021	Leonid Pilunsky	74	Politician	Crimea (Sevastopol)
21 November 2021	Chandrakant Jadhav	57	Politician	India
21 November 2021	Bert de Leon	74	Television director	Philippines (Taguig)
22 November 2021	Doug Jones	64	Baseball player	United States (Tucson)
23 November 2021	Janet Campbell Hale	75	Writer and academic	United States (Coeur d'Alene)
23 November 2021	Tatyana Chudova	77	Composer	Russia (Moscow)
24 November 2021	Aron Atabek	68	Writer	Kazakhstan (Almaty)
24 November 2021	Mārtiņš Brauns	70	Composer	Latvia (Riga)
25 November 2021	Carol Gould	68	Writer and broadcaster	United Kingdom (London)
25 November 2021	Oleksandr Omelchenko	83	Politician	Ukraine (Kyiv)
26 November 2021	Aleksandr Timoshinin	73	Rower	Russia
26 November 2021	Mohammad Reza Pourshajari	58	Iranian blogger	Turkey (Yalova)
28 November 2021	Alexander Gradsky	72	Rock singer	Russia (Moscow)
28 November 2021	Marcus Lamb	64	Televangelist	United States (Bedford)
28 November 2021	K. Sivasankar	72	Choreographer	India (Hyderabad)
29 November 2021	Robert Farris Thompson	88	Art historian	United States (New Haven)
30 November 2021	Sandor Zicherman	86	Artist	Hungary (Budapest)
1 December 2021	Raimundo Revoredo Ruiz	93	Bishop	Peru (Lima)
2 December 2021	Aldo Giordano	67	Bishop	Belgium (Louvain)
3 December 2021	Güldal Akşit	61	Politician	Turkey (Ankara)
3 December 2021	Wout Holverda	63	Footballer	Netherlands
3 December 2021	Svenne Hedlund	77	Singer	Sweden (Värnamo)
4 December 2021	Sabbaruddin Chik	79	Politician	Malaysia (Kuala Lumpur)
4 December 2021	Vinod Dua	67	Journalist	India (New Delhi)
4 December 2021	Paul Lannoye	82	Politician	Belgium
4 December 2021	Mahmoud Hammoud	57	Footballer and manager	Lebanon (Beirut)
4 December 2021	Dewa Mavhinga	42	Lawyer	South Africa
5 December 2021	Mario Turchetti	77	Historian	Switzerland (Geneva)
6 December 2021	Eugenio Minasso	62	Politician	Italy (Genoa)
7 December 2021	Raja Collure	83	Politician	Sri Lanka
7 December 2021	Joe Hernandez	81	American football player	United States (Bakersfield)
7 December 2021	Nanda Prusty	102	Teacher	India (Bhubaneswar)
8 December 2021	Barry Harris	91	Jazz musician	United States (North Bergen)
8 December 2021	Jan Józwik	69	Speed skater	Poland (Zakopane)
8 December 2021	Mark Pike	57	American football player	United States
9 December 2021	Donald Cozzens	82	Priest, author, and lecturer	United States (Mayfield Heights)
9 December 2021	Shamim Alam Khan	84	Military officer	Pakistan (Rawalpindi)
9 December 2021	Otar Patsatsia	92	Politician	Georgia (Tbilisi)
10 December 2021	Les Emmerson	77	Singer and musician	Canada (Ottawa)
11 December 2021	Mecnur Çolak	54	Footballer	Turkey
13 December 2021	Harbans Kapoor	75	Politician	India (Dehradun)
14 December 2021	Jethro	73	Comedian and singer	United Kingdom (Plymouth)
14 December 2021	Tadeusz Ross	83	Politician	Poland (Warsaw)
14 December 2021	Henry Orenstein	98	Poker player	United States (Livingston)
14 December 2021	Rosita Sokou	98	Journalist	Greece (Athens)
15 December 2021	Frédéric Sinistra	41	Kickboxer	Belgium (Havelange)
16 December 2021	Duma Nkosi	64	Politician	South Africa
17 December 2021	Doug Ericksen	52	Politician	United States (Fort Lauderdale)
18 December 2021	Bernd Grimmer	71	Politician	Germany
19 December 2021	Andrei Malyukov	73	Film director and screenwriter	Russia (Moscow)
19 December 2021	Carlos Marín	53	Singer	United Kingdom (Manchester)
20 December 2021	Umar Zahir	85	Politician	Maldives (Malé)
20 December 2021	Hasan Irlu	61–62	Diplomat	Iran (Tehran)
21 December 2021	Anthony Williams	90	Steelpan musician	Trinidad and Tobago (Port of Spain)
23 December 2021	Bartolomeo Pepe	59	Politician	Italy (Naples)
24 December 2021	Meor Yusof Aziddin	54	Folk singer	Malaysia
24 December 2021	Vladimir Tatosov	95	Actor	Russia (Saint Petersburg)
24 December 2021	Gunaratna Weerakoon	74	Politician	Sri Lanka (Colombo)
25 December 2021	Riaz Uddin Ahmed	76	Journalist	Bangladesh (Dhaka)
25 December 2021	Albert Likhanov	86	Politician and writer	Russia (Moscow)
27 December 2021	Fariz Musa	51	Politician	Malaysia (Kuala Terengganu)
27 December 2021	Defao	62	Singer-songwriter	Cameroon (Douala)
27 December 2021	Victor Socaciu	68	Politician and singer	Romania (Bucharest)
28 December 2021	Grichka Bogdanoff	72	Television presenter	France (Paris)
28 December 2021	Stanislav Huml	66	Politician	Czech Republic
28 December 2021	Nauvdip Kumar Sodhi	78	Judge	India (Chandigarh)
29 December 2021	Simão Almeida	77	Politician	Brazil (João Pessoa)
29 December 2021	Paolo Giordano	59	Guitarist	Italy (Pescara)
29 December 2021	Peter Klatzow	76	Composer	South Africa (Cape Town)
30 December 2021	Karel Loprais	72	Rally raid driver	Czech Republic (Nový Jičín)
31 December 2021	Juraj Filas	66	Composer	Czech Republic (Prague)
2 January 2022	Kenny J	69	Singer	Trinidad and Tobago (Pointe-à-Pierre)
3 January 2022	George Bălan	92	Philosopher	Germany (Freiburg im Breisgau)
3 January 2022	Igor Bogdanoff	72	Television presenter	France (Paris)
3 January 2022	Kamel Lemoui	82	Footballer and manager	France (Paris)
3 January 2022	Jud Logan	62	Athlete	United States (Ashland)
3 January 2022	Ibrahim Hegazi	78	Politician and journalist	Egypt
4 January 2022	Ross Browner	72	American football player	United States (Nashville)
4 January 2022	Tommy Matchick	78	Baseball player	United States (Sylvania)
4 January 2022	Craig Ruddy	53	Artist	Australia (Byron Bay)
6 January 2022	Gloria Piedimonte	66	Actress	Italy (Mantua)
6 January 2022	Samuel K. Tan	88	Historian	Philippines
6 January 2022	Carlo Meliciani	93	Opera singer	Italy (Genoa)
6 January 2022	Cyril George	74	Politician	South Africa
7 January 2022	José Évrard	76	Politician	France
7 January 2022	Anatoly Kvashnin	75	Military officer	Russia (Moscow)
7 January 2022	Aili Venonya	59	Politician	Namibia
8 January 2022	Baktash Abtin	48	Poet and filmmaker	Iran (Tehran)
9 January 2022	Wael el-Ebrashy	58	Journalist	Egypt (Cairo)
9 January 2022	Tahani al-Gebali	71	Judge	Egypt (Cairo)
9 January 2022	R. Dean Taylor	82	Musician and singer	United States (Los Angeles)
10 January 2022	Robert Durst	78	Convicted murderer and real estate heir	United States (Stockton)
10 January 2022	Jan Ciechanowicz	76	Politician	Poland (Płock)
11 January 2022	Anatoly Alyabyev	70	Biathlete	Russia (Saint Petersburg)
11 January 2022	Kay McNamee	91	Swimmer	Canada (Richmond)
11 January 2022	A. G. S. Ram Babu	59	Politician	India (Chennai)
11 January 2022	Don Sutherin	85	American football player	United States (Canton)
12 January 2022	J. Robert Wright	85	Priest	United States (New York City)
13 January 2022	Cholly Naranjo	87	Baseball player	United States (Miami)
13 January 2022	Lambert Amon Tanoh	95	Politician	Ivory Coast
14 January 2022	Ann Arensberg	84	Author	United States (Sharon)
14 January 2022	Ricardo Bofill	82	Architect	Spain (Barcelona)
14 January 2022	Anastasia Voznesenskaya	78	Actress	Russia (Moscow)
14 January 2022	Qi Huaiyuan	92	Politician	China (Beijing)
14 January 2022	J. Alexander	83	Politician	India (Bangalore)
15 January 2022	Quarto Pianesi	81	Ice hockey player	Italy (Milan)
16 January 2022	Ibrahim Ashk	70	Poet	India (Mumbai)
16 January 2022	Alleppey Ranganath	72	Composer	India (Kottayam)
16 January 2022	Jeremy Sivits	42	Convicted torturer and United States Army reservist	United States (Roaring Spring)
16 January 2022	Paul Myners, Baron Myners	73	Peer and politician	United Kingdom (London)
17 January 2022	Bill Jackson	86	Television personality	United States (Paso Robles)
17 January 2022	M. K. Prasad	89	Environmentalist	India (Kochi)
18 January 2022	Hilario Candela	87	Architect	United States (Coral Gables)
18 January 2022	Ron Franklin	79	Sportscaster	United States (Austin)
18 January 2022	Freddie Hughes	78	Singer	United States (Oakland)
18 January 2022	Ankica Lepej	74	Activist	Croatia (Zagreb)
18 January 2022	David L. Paul	82	Banker	United States (New York City)
18 January 2022	Don Pepot	88	Comedian	Philippines (Valenzuela)
18 January 2022	Elio Pietrini	83	Actor	United States (Miami)
18 January 2022	André Leon Talley	73	Journalist	United States (White Plains)
18 January 2022	Badal Roy	82	Tabla player	United States (Wilmington)
19 January 2022	Elmar Fischer	85	Bishop	Austria (Feldkirch)
19 January 2022	Aleksandr Nazarenko	74	Historian	Russia (Moscow)
20 January 2022	José Augusto Curvo	72	Politician	Brazil (Cuiabá)
20 January 2022	Meat Loaf	74	Singer	United States (Nashville)
20 January 2022	Sidney August Anthony Miller Jr.	89	Music industry executive	United States (Arlington County)
20 January 2022	Camillo Milli	92	Actor	Italy (Genoa)
21 January 2022	James Forbes	69	Basketball player	United States (El Paso)
21 January 2022	Arnie Kantrowitz	81	LGBT activist	United States (New York City)
21 January 2022	Dennis Smith	81	Writer	United States (Venice)
21 January 2022	Aftab Ahmed Khan	81	Police officer	India (Mumbai)
22 January 2022	Bill Owens	84	Politician	United States (Boston)
22 January 2022	Katuutire Kaura	80	Politician	Namibia (Windhoek)
22 January 2022	Rasmi Djabrailov	89	Actor	Russia (Moscow)
22 January 2022	Subhash Bhowmick	71	Footballer	India (Kolkata)
22 January 2022	Lavrentije Trifunović	86	Bishop	Serbia (Šabac)
23 January 2022	Barbara Krafftówna	93	Actress	Poland (Konstancin-Jeziorna)
24 January 2022	Olavo de Carvalho	74	Polemicist and journalist	United States (Richmond)
24 January 2022	Szilveszter Csollány	51	Gymnast	Hungary (Budapest)
24 January 2022	Fatma Girik	79	Actress	Turkey (Istanbul)
24 January 2022	Aftab Baloch	68	Cricketer	Pakistan (Karachi)
24 January 2022	Butana Komphela	66	Politician	South Africa (Bloemfontein)
25 January 2022	Svetlana Căpățînă	52	Politician	Moldova (Chișinău)
25 January 2022	Ramón Martínez	73	Politician	Venezuela (Cumaná)
26 January 2022	Bud Brown	94	Politician	United States (Urbana)
26 January 2022	Víctor Paredes Guerra	77	Politician and academic	Peru (Lima)
27 January 2022	Pavlo Kuznietsov	71	Politician	Ukraine (Kyiv)
27 January 2022	Diego Verdaguer	70	Singer-songwriter	United States (Los Angeles)
28 January 2022	Mel Mermelstein	95	Holocaust survivor	United States (Long Beach)
29 January 2022	Suresh Bansal	78	Politician	India (Ghaziabad)
29 January 2022	Hermenegildo Ramírez Sánchez	92	Bishop	Mexico (Querétaro City)
29 January 2022	Simon Lokodo	64	Politician	Switzerland (Geneva)
30 January 2022	Roberto Digón	86	Politician	Argentina (Buenos Aires)
30 January 2022	Viktor Merezhko	84	Screenwriter	Russia (Moscow)
30 January 2022	William Mordeno	74	Sprinter	Philippines (Butuan)
30 January 2022	Philip Paul	96	Studio drummer	United States (Cincinnati)
31 January 2022	James Bidgood	88	Photographer	United States (New York City)
31 January 2022	Onésimo Cepeda Silva	84	Bishop	Mexico (Mexico City)
31 January 2022	C. R. Rajagopalan	64	Writer	India (Thrissur)
1 February 2022	Glenn Wheatley	74	Talent manager	Australia (Melbourne)
1 February 2022	Paolo Graziosi	82	Actor	Italy (Vicenza)
2 February 2022	Gajanan Dharmshi Babar	78	Politician	India (Pune)
3 February 2022	Martin B. Moore	84	Politician	United States (Bethel)
3 February 2022	Francisco Raúl Villalobos Padilla	101	Bishop	Mexico (Saltillo)
4 February 2022	FRM Nazmul Ahasan	66	Judge	Bangladesh (Dhaka)
4 February 2022	Leland Christensen	62	Politician	United States (Idaho Falls)
4 February 2022	Peetam Ram	71	Politician	India (Bareilly)
4 February 2022	Maria Prestes	92	Activist	Brazil (Rio de Janeiro)
5 February 2022	David Fuller	80	Politician	United States (Helena)
5 February 2022	Todd Gitlin	79	Sociologist, political activist, and author	United States (Pittsfield)
6 February 2022	Lata Mangeshkar	92	Playback singer	India (Mumbai)
6 February 2022	Abdelmalek Ali Messaoud	66	Footballer	Algeria (Annaba)
6 February 2022	Hans Neuenfels	80	Theater director	Germany (Berlin)
6 February 2022	Gary DeLaune	88	News reporter and sportscaster	United States (San Antonio)
7 February 2022	Boris Deich	83	Politician	Russia (Moscow)
9 February 2022	Rudy Abbott	81	College baseball coach	United States (Jacksonville)
9 February 2022	Ziad Al-Zaza	66	Politician	State of Palestine (Gaza City)
9 February 2022	Fabio Duque Jaramillo	71	Bishop	Colombia (Medellín)
9 February 2022	Super Muñeco	69	Professional wrestler	Mexico (Mexico City)
10 February 2022	Sugnya Bhatt	80	Judge	India (Ahmedabad)
11 February 2022	Knightowl	55	Rap artist	United States (San Diego)
11 February 2022	Mārtiņš Rītiņš	72	Chef and television presenter	Latvia (Riga)
12 February 2022	Tomás Osvaldo González Morales	86	Bishop	Chile (Punta Arenas)
12 February 2022	Edmur Mesquita	67	Politician	Brazil (São Paulo)
12 February 2022	Zinaida Kiriyenko	88	Actress	Russia (Moscow)
13 February 2022	John Keston	97	Stage actor and runner	United States (Minneapolis)
13 February 2022	Fabio Restrepo	62	Actor	Colombia (Medellín)
14 February 2022	Tony Fuochi	66	Voice actor	Italy (Padua)
14 February 2022	Mickie Henson	59	Professional wrestling referee	United States (Key West)
14 February 2022	Nancy Lord	70	Attorney	United States (Show Low)
14 February 2022	Tom Veitch	80	Comic book writer	United States (Bellows Falls)
14 February 2022	Borislav Ivkov	88	Chess player	Serbia (Belgrade)
15 February 2022	Onur Kumbaracıbaşı	83	Politician	Turkey (Ankara)
15 February 2022	Tamaz Mechiauri	67	Politician	Georgia (Tbilisi)
15 February 2022	Sandhya Mukherjee	90	Singer	India (Kolkata)
15 February 2022	Artur Albarran	69	Journalist	Portugal (Lisbon)
15 February 2022	Bappi Lahiri	69	Singer	India (Mumbai)
15 February 2022	David Chidgey, Baron Chidgey	79	Peer and politician	United Kingdom
16 February 2022	Vasilis Botinos	77	Footballer	France (Nice)
16 February 2022	Cristina Calderón	93	Cultural activist	Chile (Punta Arenas)
16 February 2022	Dorce Gamalama	58	Television presenter	Indonesia (Jakarta)
16 February 2022	Chennaveera Kanavi	93	Poet and writer	India (Dharwad)
16 February 2022	Alpheus Muheua	65	Politician	Namibia (Swakopmund)
17 February 2022	Marc Hamilton	78	Singer	Canada (Saint-Jérôme)
17 February 2022	Giuseppe Ros	79	Boxer	Italy (Vittorio Veneto)
17 February 2022	Américo Martín	84	Politician	Venezuela (Caracas)
17 February 2022	Surajit Sengupta	70	Footballer	India (Kolkata)
17 February 2022	Sudgir Joshi	81	Politician	India (Mumbai)
18 February 2022	Brad Johnson	62	Actor	United States (Fort Worth)
18 February 2022	Boris Nevzorov	72	Actor and film director	Russia (Moscow)
18 February 2022	Witold Paszt	68	Singer	Poland (Zamość)
18 February 2022	Gennadi Yukhtin	89	Actor	Russia (Moscow)
19 February 2022	Sergei Beletzkiy	68	Archaeologist and historian	Russia (Saint Petersburg)
20 February 2022	Quazi Rosy	73	Poet and politician	Bangladesh (Dhaka)
20 February 2022	Oleksandr Sydorenko	61	Swimmer	Ukraine (Mariupol)
21 February 2022	Mekapati Goutham Reddy	50	Film director	India (Hyderabad)
22 February 2022	Geraldo Sarno	83	Film director	Brazil (Rio de Janeiro)
22 February 2022	Agustín Rodríguez Fuentes	71	Politician	Mexico
22 February 2022	Kausar Ahmed Chaudhury	77	Lyricist	Bangladesh (Dhaka)
23 February 2022	José Isidro Guerrero Macías	70	Bishop	Mexico (Mexicali)
23 February 2022	Rehman Malik	70	Politician	Pakistan (Islamabad)
23 February 2022	Joeli Vidiri	48	Rugby union player	United States (Sacramento)
24 February 2022	Eduardo Mirás	92	Bishop	Argentina (Rosario)
24 February 2022	Morley Sewell	88	Veterinarian	United Kingdom (Edinburgh)
25 February 2022	Estanislao de Grandes	74	Diplomat	Spain (Madrid)
25 February 2022	Hemananda Biswal	82	Politician	India (Bhubaneswar)
28 February 2022	Gaetano Giani Luporini	85	Composer	Italy (Barga)
2 March 2022	Israel Beltrán Montes	74	Businessman and politician	Mexico (Chihuahua City)
3 March 2022	Fernando Carlos Maletti	72	Bishop	Argentina (Buenos Aires)
5 March 2022	Roberto Rivas Reyes	67	Politician	Nicaragua (Managua)
6 March 2022	Geraldo Melo	86	Politician	Brazil (Natal)
7 March 2022	Renny Cushing	69	Politician	United States (Hampton)
8 March 2022	Valeriy Petrov	67	Footballer and coach	Ukraine (Simferopol)
8 March 2022	Isao Suzuki	89	Double-bassist	Japan (Kawasaki)
13 March 2022	Christopher Moore	70	Historian	United States (Brooklyn)
14 March 2022	Anil Joshiyara	68	Politician	India (Chennai)
14 March 2022	Francisco Solís Peón	53	Politician	Mexico (Mérida)
14 March 2022	Steve Wilhite	74	Computer scientist	United States (Cincinnati)
15 March 2022	Norpipah Abdol	67	Politician	Malaysia (Putrajaya)
16 March 2022	Dzintars Jaundžeikars	66	Politician	Latvia
19 March 2022	Tom Moody	60s	Visual artist	United States (Goldthwaite)
19 March 2022	B. K. N. Chhibber	86	Politician and military officer	India
19 March 2022	Lyell Cresswell	77	Composer	United Kingdom (Edinburgh)
22 March 2022	Luiz Pinguelli Rosa	80	Scientist	Brazil (Rio de Janeiro)
23 March 2022	Milovan Vitezović	77	Writer	Serbia (Belgrade)
25 March 2022	Ivan Dikunov	80	Sculptor	Russia
6 April 2022	Vladimir Zhirinovsky	75	Politician	Russia (Moscow)
13 April 2022	Jorge Trías	73	Lawyer and politician	Spain (Barcelona)
17 April 2022	DJ Kay Slay	55	Disc jockey and record executive	United States (New York City)
23 April 2022	Tarachand Chheda	71	Politician	India (Bhuj)
25 April 2022	Salvatore Pica	83	Art collector	Italy (Naples)
28 April 2022	Marisol Panotes	76	Politician	Philippines (Camarines Norte)
29 April 2022	Robert Goolrick	73	Writer	United States (Lynchburg)
1 May 2022	Charles Siebert	84	Actor and director	United States (San Francisco)
3 May 2022	Stanislav Shushkevich	87	Politician	Belarus (Minsk)
4 May 2022	Lalli Partinen	80	Ice hockey player	Finland (Lappeenranta)
4 May 2022	Howie Pyro	61	Bassist	United States (Los Angeles)
6 May 2022	Bojjala Gopala Krishna Reddy	73	Politician	India (Hyderabad)
8 May 2022	Arthur Nzeribe	83	Politician	Nigeria (Oguta)
17 May 2022	Vangelis	79	Musician and composer	France (Paris)
22 May 2022	Lee Lawson	80	Actress	United States (New York City)
22 May 2022	Jaakko Syrjä	96	Writer	Finland (Ylöjärvi)
22 May 2022	Fahmi Idris	78	Politician	Indonesia (Jakarta)
22 May 2022	Aimé Ngoy Mukena	68	Politician	Democratic Republic of the Congo (Lubumbashi)
27 May 2022	Angelo Sodano	94	Cardinal	Italy (Rome)
28 May 2022	Bujar Nishani	55	Politician	Germany (Berlin)
31 May 2022	Zaire Rezende	90	Politician	Brazil (Uberlândia)
3 June 2022	José de Abreu	77	Politician	Brazil (São Paulo)
4 June 2022	Dmitry Kovtun	56	Intelligence officer	Russia (Moscow)
18 June 2022	Nelson Proença	71	Politician	Brazil (São Paulo)
27 June 2022	Giles Mutsekwa	73	Politician	Zimbabwe
1 July 2022	Reanna Solomon	40	Weightlifter	Nauru (Denigomodu)
5 July 2022	P. Gopinathan Nair	99	Social worker	India (Neyyattinkara)
5 July 2022	Mohammed Barkindo	63	Politician	Nigeria (Abuja)
8 July 2022	José Eduardo dos Santos	79	Politician	Spain (Barcelona)
12 July 2022	Vicente Fialho	84	Politician	Brazil (Fortaleza)
12 July 2022	Michael Fowler	92	Politician and architect	
13 July 2022	Michael James Jackson	77	Record producer	United States (Los Angeles)
18 July 2022	Bhupinder Singh	82	Singer	India (Mumbai)
23 July 2022	Sid Jacobson	92	Comic book writer	United States (San Mateo)
25 July 2022	Richard Tait	58	Board game designer	United States (Bainbridge Island)
26 July 2022	Eli N. Evans	85	Writer	United States (New York City)
26 July 2022	Sy Johnson	92	Jazz composer	United States (New York City)
28 July 2022	H. Rajesh Prasad	55	Politician	India
29 July 2022	József Kardos	62	Footballer	Hungary
31 July 2022	Fidel V. Ramos	94	Politician	Philippines (Makati)
2 August 2022	Luis Augusto Castro Quiroga	80	Archbishop	Colombia (Chía)
7 August 2022	Bert Fields	93	Lawyer	United States (Malibu)
8 August 2022	Jozef Tomko	98	Cardinal	Italy (Rome)
9 August 2022	Donald Machholz	69	Astronomer	United States (Wikieup)
11 August 2022	Marco Brown	94	Politician	Jamaica
12 August 2022	Andrea Galasso	89	Politician	Italy (Naples)
14 August 2022	Yosiwo George	81	Politician	Micronesia
14 August 2022	James Riordan	72	Politician	United States (Johnston)
14 August 2022	Dmitri Vrubel	62	Artist	Germany (Berlin)
16 August 2022	Narayan	81	Writer	India (Kochi)
20 August 2022	Samar Banerjee	92	Footballer	India (Kolkata)
20 August 2022	Theodore Bugas	98	Politician	United States (Portland)
22 August 2022	Abdul Halim Abdul Rahman	82	Politician	Malaysia (Kota Bharu)
22 August 2022	Manouchehr Esmaeili	83	Actor	Iran (Tehran)
26 August 2022	William A. Jenkins	104	Military officer	United States (Port St. Lucie)
29 August 2022	Vladimir Gusev	90	Politician	Russia (Saratov)
30 August 2022	Liu Shunsong	69	Politician	Taiwan (Taipei)
11 September 2022	Syeda Sajeda Chowdhury	87	Politician	Bangladesh (Dhaka)
11 September 2022	Javier Marías	70	Author	Spain (Madrid)
11 September 2022	Krishnam Raju	82	Actor and politician	India (Hyderabad)
14 September 2022	Rubén Placanica	79	Cyclist	Argentina (Buenos Aires)
18 September 2022	Vincent Di Maio	81	Pathologist	United States (San Antonio)
19 September 2022	Bishnu Sethi	61	Politician	India (Bhubaneswar)
4 October 2022	Kim Dong-gil	94	Politician	South Korea (Seoul)
9 October 2022	Chuck Deardorf	68	Bassist	United States (Seattle)
11 October 2022	Herbert Chabot	91	Judge	United States (Aspen Hill)
12 October 2022	Nikolay Petrunin	46	Politician	Russia (Moscow)
12 October 2022	Jeremy Rogers	85	Boat builder and sailor	United Kingdom
13 October 2022	Doug Brignole	62	Bodybuilder	United States
15 October 2022	Sylvia Laughter	63	Politician	United States (Mesa)
15 October 2022	Cyrus Mann	66	Basketball player	United States (Detroit)
16 October 2022	Alexey Obukhov	85	Diplomat	Russia
18 October 2022	Valery Rubakov	67	Theoretical physicist	Russia (Sarov)
26 October 2022	Julie Powell	46	Writer	United States (Olivebridge)
4 November 2022	Iso Moreira	75	Politician	Brazil (Rio de Janeiro)
5 November 2022	Bill Treacher	92	Actor	United Kingdom (Ipswich)
15 November 2022	Manuel Sanguily	89	Physician and swimmer	United States (Tarrytown)
22 November 2022	John Y. Brown Jr.	88	Politician and businessman	United States (Lexington)
1 December 2022	Gaylord Perry	84	Baseball player	United States (Gaffney)
3 December 2022	Ilya Shtemler	89	Writer	Russia (Saint Petersburg)
6 December 2022	Bart de Vries	57	Actor	Netherlands
7 December 2022	Jan Nowicki	83	Actor	Poland
9 December 2022	Milton Viorst	92	Journalist	United States (Washington)
12 December 2022	Gosaku Ota	74	Manga artist	Japan
16 December 2022	Charlie Gracie	86	Singer	United States (Philadelphia)
20 December 2022	Zhu Zhihong	89	Politician	China (Nanchang)
21 December 2022	Zhang Guocheng	91	Engineer	China (Beijing)
22 December 2022	John Moffat Fugui	61	Politician	China (Beijing)
25 December 2022	Haim Drukman	90	Politician and rabbi	Israel (Jerusalem)
25 December 2022	Jo Sehui	80	Poet	South Korea (Seoul)
25 December 2022	Wang Wenjiao	89	Badminton player	China (Beijing)
25 December 2022	Li Ziliu	90	Politician	China (Guangzhou)
25 December 2022	Wang Zhongqi	90	Engineer	China (Harbin)
26 December 2022	Guan Qiao	87	Politician and engineer	China (Beijing)
27 December 2022	Song Qingwei	93	Military officer and politician	China (Beijing)
28 December 2022	Linda de Suza	74	Singer	France (Gisors)
28 December 2022	Liu Mingzu	86	Politician	China (Weihai)
30 December 2022	Li Jing	92	Military officer and politician	China (Beijing)
30 December 2022	Chu Lanlan	40	Opera Singer	China (Beijing)
30 December 2022	Jian Xianfo	107	Politician	China (Beijing)
31 December 2022	Khandaker Mahbub Hossain	84	Politician and lawyer	Bangladesh (Dhaka)
1 January 2023	Fan Weitang	87	Politician and engineer	China (Beijing)
1 January 2023	Zhu Zushou	77	Diplomat	China (Beijing)
2 January 2023	Hu Fuming	87	Politician and scholar	China
6 January 2023	Lew Hunter	87	Screenwriter and educator	United States (Tucson)
8 January 2023	Wu Tao	82	Diplomat	China (Beijing)
9 January 2023	Keshari Nath Tripathi	82	Politician	India (Prayagraj)
11 January 2023	Ben Masters	75	Actor	United States (Palm Springs)
18 January 2023	David Crosby	81	Singer	United States (Santa Ynez)
20 January 2023	He Haoju	100	Politician	China (Chengdu)
27 January 2023	Alfred Leslie	95	Painter	United States (Brooklyn)
2 February 2023	John Zizioulas	92	Bishop	Greece (Athens)
3 February 2023	Naďa Urbánková	83	Actress and singer	Czech Republic (Prague)
9 February 2023	Yukio Takano	85	Politician	Japan (Tokyo)
12 February 2023	Vadim Abdrashitov	78	Film director	Russia (Moscow)
21 February 2023	Achebe Betty Powell	82	Activist and community leader	United States (Brooklyn)
3 March 2023	David Lindley	78	Singer and composer	United States (Pomona)
5 March 2023	Allan Jay	91	Fencer	United Kingdom
21 March 2023	Oleksandr Kozarenko	59	Composer	Ukraine (Ivano-Frankivsk)
23 March 2023	Israel Zelitch	98	Plant pathologist and ecologist	United States (Haverhill)
26 March 2023	Innocent	75	Politician and actor	India (Kochi)
31 March 2023	Ada Bello	89	LGBTQ rights activist	United States (Philadelphia)
6 April 2023	Kent C. Nelson	85	Businessman	United States (Atlanta)
6 April 2023	Jagarnath Mahto	56	Politician	India (Chennai)
11 April 2023	Zafrullah Chowdhury	81	Public Health Activist	Bangladesh (Dhaka)
16 May 2023	Reiji Oyama	96	Pastor	Japan
28 May 2023	George Cassidy	86	Jazz musician	United Kingdom (Belfast)
11 June 2023	Jesús Ruiz Fernández	74	Politician	Spain (Arcos de la Frontera)
13 August 2023	José Murilo de Carvalho	83	Historian	Brazil (Rio de Janeiro)
24 August 2023	Bray Wyatt	36	Wrestler	United States (Brooksville)
8 September 2023	Dolores Nunes	82	Lawyer and politician	Brazil (Palmas)
2 October 2023	Lefteris Hapsiadis	69	Songwriter	Greece (Alexandroupolis)
20 October 2023	Vera Klement	93	Artist	United States (Evanston)
21 October 2023	Sergio Staino	83	Author	Italy (Rome)
26 October 2023	Guy Camberabero	87	Rugby union player	France (Valence)
7 December 2023	Sang Guowei	82	Politician	China (Beijing)
11 December 2023	Ken Kelsch	76	Cinematographer	United States (Hackettstown, NJ)
12 December 2023	Mario Valdemarin	96	Actor	Italy (Rome)
13 December 2023	Yılmaz Atadeniz	91	Film director	Turkey (Istanbul)
24 December 2023	Vasilis Karras	70	Singer	Greece (Thessaloniki)
28 December 2023	Vijayakanth	71	Actor and politician	India (Chennai)
2 January 2024	Noel Aguirre	63	Politician, economist and academic	Bolivia (La Paz)
2 January 2024	Chris Karrer	76	Guitarist and composer	Germany (Kempten)
3 January 2024	Derek Draper	56	Lobbyist and political adviser	United Kingdom (London)
9 January 2024	Edward Jay Epstein	88	Investigative journalist and professor	United States (New York City)
13 January 2024	Tom Shales	79	Writer and television critic	United States (Alexandria, VA)
29 January 2024	Alice Mackler	92	Artist and painter	United States (Brooklyn)
1 February 2024	Patrick Hanks	83	Lexicographer and linguist	United Kingdom
7 March 2024	Son Myung-soon	95	First Lady of South Korea	South Korea (Seoul)
11 March 2024	Paul Alexander	78	Lawyer and polio survivor, iron lung user since 1952	United States (Dallas)
11 March 2024	David Mixner	77	Political activist and author	United States (New York City)
30 March 2024	Benoît Pelletier	64	Politician	Mexico
10 April 2024	Frank Olson	91	Business executive	United States (Palm Beach)
12 April 2024	Carrie Robbins	81	Costume designer	United States (New York City)
18 April 2024	Lee B. Laskin	87	Judge, politician, and attorney	United States (Evesham Township)
28 April 2024	Zack Norman	83	Actor, comedian, film producer, and art collector	United States (Burbank)
3 May 2024	Kazuo Aichi	86	Politician	Japan (Tokyo)
3 May 2024	Dick Rutan	85	Aviator and military officer	United States (Coeur d'Alene)
25 May 2024	Peter Rosenthal	82	Mathematician and lawyer	Canada (Toronto)
20 June 2024	Haviland Smith	94	CIA station chief	United States (Monroe Township)
9 July 2024	Dan Collins	80	Journalist and author	United States (New York City)
19 July 2024	Aldo Puglisi	89	Actor	Italy (Catania)
1 August 2024	Joe Hand Sr.	87	Businessman and media executive	United States (Philadelphia)
4 August 2024	Anthony Hamilton-Smith, 3rd Baron Colwyn	82	Peer and politician	United Kingdom
30 August 2024	George Berci	103	Surgeon	United States (Los Angeles)
6 September 2024	Sérgio Mendes	83	Musician	United States (Los Angeles)
8 October 2024	Donnie Marshall	92	Ice hockey player	United States (Stuart, FL)
12 December 2024	Amparo Guillén	71	Actress	Colombia (Cali)
3 February 2025	David Edward Byrd	83	Graphic artist	United States (Albuquerque)
15 February 2025	M. Paul Friedberg	93	Landscape architect	United States (New York City)
25 March 2025	J. Bennett Johnston	92	Politician	United States (McLean, VA)
15 June 2025	Thornton Willis	89	Painter	United States (New York City)
30 June 2025	Kenneth Colley	87	Actor	United Kingdom (Ashford)
30 July 2025	T. S. Ellis III	85	Judge	United States (Keswick, VA)
14 September 2025	Tess Johnston	93	Author and foreign service specialist	United States (Washington, D.C.)
8 November 2025	Cacho de la Cruz	88	Television presenter and humorist	Uruguay (Montevideo)
11 November 2025	Ingamay Bylund	78	Equestrian	Sweden (Varberg)
8 February 2026	Jung Jin-woo	88	Film director	South Korea (Seoul)

== See also ==
- Deaths in 2020
- Deaths in 2021
- Deaths in 2022
- Deaths in 2023
- Deaths of anti-vaccine advocates from COVID-19
- List of COVID-19 deaths in North America
- List of COVID-19 deaths in South Africa
