= Deaths in November 2020 =

The following is a list of notable deaths in November 2020.

Entries for each day are listed alphabetically by surname. A typical entry lists information in the following sequence:

- Name, age, country of citizenship at birth, subsequent country of citizenship (if applicable), reason for notability, cause of death (if known), and reference.

== November 2020 ==
=== 1 ===
- Hryhoriy Arshynov, 59, Ukrainian civil engineer and activist, COVID-19.
- Carol Arthur, 85, American actress (Blazing Saddles, The Sunshine Boys, Making It), Alzheimer's disease.
- Julio Bécquer, 88, Cuban-born American baseball player (Washington Senators, Los Angeles Angels, Minnesota Twins), COVID-19.
- Tonny Bruins Slot, 73, Dutch football manager (FC Barcelona, Ajax, Benfica).
- Rachel Caine, 58, American novelist, soft-tissue sarcoma.
- Chang Yi, 68, Taiwanese film director (Jade Love, Kuei-Mei, a Woman), co-founder of Liuli Gongfang.
- Paul Crane, 76, American football player (New York Jets).
- Ali El Kenz, 74, Algerian writer and sociologist.
- John R. Dunne, 90, American jurist and politician, member of the New York Senate (1966–1989).
- B. John Garrick, 90, American nuclear engineer and risk scientist, complications from a fall.
- Tuomas Gerdt, 98, Finnish military officer, last surviving Mannerheim Cross recipient.
- Yalçın Granit, 88, Turkish Olympic basketball player (1952).
- Eddie Hassell, 30, American actor (The Kids Are All Right, Surface, Devious Maids), shot.
- Keith Hitchins, 89, American historian specialized on Romanian history.
- Pedro Iturralde, 91, Spanish saxophonist and composer.
- Phil K, 51, Australian DJ (Lostep), bladder cancer.
- Dan Kohn, 47, American entrepreneur, founder of NetMarket, complications from colon cancer.
- Burhan Kuzu, 65, Turkish politician, MP (2002–2018), COVID-19.
- Nikolay Maksyuta, 73, Russian politician, governor of Volgograd Oblast (1997–2010), COVID-19.
- Don McDermott, 90, American speed skater, Olympic silver medalist (1952).
- Nikki McKibbin, 42, American singer-songwriter and reality show contestant (American Idol), brain aneurysm.
- Des Moore, 88, Australian economist.
- Nicholas Morgan, ?, English shot putter.
- Jorge Núñez Sánchez, 73, Ecuadorian writer and historian, cancer.
- Ronnie Peel, 74, Australian guitarist and singer (Thunderclap Newman, The La De Da's, John Paul Young).
- Mario Pereyra, 77, Argentine radio host and businessman, COVID-19.
- Stafford Poole, 90, American Catholic priest and research historian.
- Enuga Sreenivasulu Reddy, 96, Indian anti-Apartheid activist.
- Lady Elizabeth Shakerley, 79, British socialite.
- Tinín, 74, Spanish matador.
- Billy Tubbs, 85, American basketball coach (Lamar Cardinals, Oklahoma Sooners, TCU Horned Frogs), leukemia.
- Wolfgang Webner, 83, German Olympic volleyball player.

=== 2 ===
- Dietrich Adam, 67, German actor (Mostly Martha, French for Beginners, Storm of Love).
- Robert Sam Anson, 75, American journalist and author.
- Quincy Armstrong, 91, American football player (Hamilton Tiger-Cats, Cleveland Browns, Ottawa Rough Riders).
- Earl Brian, 78, American physician and businessman.
- Dorothy Christ, 95, American baseball player (South Bend Blue Sox).
- Nancy Darsch, 68, American basketball coach, Olympic champion (1984, 1996), complications from Parkinson's disease.
- Léo de Almeida Neves, 88, Brazilian politician, economist and lawyer, deputy (1967–1969, 1983–1987), intestinal problems.
- Rajko Đurić, 73, Serbian writer.
- Roy Edwards, 66, American politician, member of the Wyoming House of Representatives (since 2015), COVID-19.
- David Faulkner, 86, British civil servant and academic.
- Peter Goodwright, 84, English impressionist (Who Do You Do?).
- Chuck Hartman, 85, American baseball coach (Virginia Tech Hokies).
- Ashish Kakkad, 49, Indian film director (Mission Mummy), writer and actor (Kai Po Che!, Vitamin She), heart attack.
- T. N. Krishnan, 92, Indian Carnatic violinist.
- Ahmed Laraki, 89, Moroccan politician, prime minister (1969–1971).
- Euan MacKie, 84, British archaeologist and anthropologist.
- Bhagirathi Majhi, 66, Indian politician, MP (2006–2010), COVID-19.
- Trevor Malloch, 91, New Zealand cricketer (Wellington).
- Oscar W. McConkie Jr., 94, American politician, president of the Utah State Senate (1965–1966), COVID-19.
- Raju Mishra, 72, Indian cinematographer (Aranya Rodan, Nirbachana, Joymoti), screenwriter and film director, cardiac arrest.
- Harry Palmer, 90. Canadian photographer.
- Park Ji-sun, 35, South Korean comedian and actress.
- Gigi Proietti, 80, Italian actor (Febbre da cavallo, Lady Liberty, Brancaleone at the Crusades) and comedian, heart attack.
- Rodolfo Rabanal, 80, Argentine writer and journalist, brain cancer.
- Elsa Raven, 91, American actress (Back to the Future, Amen, Titanic).
- John Sessions, 67, British actor and comedian (Stella Street, Spitting Image, Whose Line Is It Anyway?), heart attack.
- Satish Prasad Singh, 84, Indian politician, MP (1980–1984) and chief minister of Bihar (1968), COVID-19.
- Karl Sitter, 92, Austrian Olympic rower (1948).
- Maria Tsien, 95, American actress.
- Max Ward, 98, Canadian aviator, founder of Wardair.
- Baron Wolman, 83, American photographer (Rolling Stone), complications from amyotrophic lateral sclerosis.

=== 3 ===
- Isaac Alvarez, 90, French actor and mime.
- Anthony Van Dyck, 4, Irish racehorse, euthanised.
- Irvin Baxter Jr., 75, American Pentecostal preacher and televangelist, COVID-19.
- Henry Brind, 93, British diplomat, ambassador to Somalia (1977–1980) and high commissioner to Malawi (1983–1987).
- Gennady Bukharin, 91, Russian sprint canoeist, double World champion (1958).
- Blair Campbell, 74, Australian cricketer (Victoria, Tasmania) and footballer (Richmond).
- Taymi Chappé, 52, Cuban-Spanish Olympic fencer (1996).
- Anne Covell, 70, Canadian Olympic athlete (1968).
- Ron Fogg, 82, English footballer (Weymouth, Bedford Town, Aldershot).
- Claude Giraud, 84, French actor (Angélique, Marquise des Anges, Circle of Love, The Mad Adventures of Rabbi Jacob).
- Maurice Healy, 86, British consumer campaigner.
- William Helburn, 96, American photographer.
- Dharshibhai Khanpura, 80, Indian politician, Gujarat MLA (1990–2007, 2012–2017), COVID-19.
- Matti Laakso, 79, Finnish Olympic wrestler (1960, 1964, 1972).
- Faustas Latėnas, 64, Lithuanian composer (My Little Wife, Wooden Staircase).
- Georges Massicotte, 90, Canadian politician, Quebec MNA (1973–1976).
- Seno Nugroho, 48, Indonesian artist and puppeteer, heart attack.
- Aileen Passloff, 89, American dancer and choreographer, heart failure.
- Jacques Pereira, 65, Portuguese footballer (Braga, Porto, national team), heart failure.
- H. G. Somashekar Rao, 86, Indian actor (27 Mavalli Circle, Mithileya Seetheyaru, Koormavatara), cardiac arrest.
- Grzegorz Szerszenowicz, 75, Polish footballer (Broń Radom, Jagiellonia Białystok, Mazur Ełk).
- Don Talbot, 87, Australian Olympic Hall of Fame swimming coach.

=== 4 ===
- Lalit Bhati, 61, Indian politician, COVID-19.
- Lakhdar Bouregaa, 87, Algerian independentist militant, COVID-19.
- Ronald Donatucci, 72, American politician, member of the Pennsylvania House of Representatives (1977–1980).
- Maurice Faivre, 94, French general and political scientist.
- Theodore Friend, 89, American historian, president of Swarthmore College (1973–1982), cancer.
- Sead Gološ, 51, Bosnian architect, COVID-19.
- Ken Hensley, 75, English singer-songwriter (Uriah Heep, Blackfoot, Toe Fat).
- Bruce Hurley, 86, American politician, member of the Tennessee House of Representatives (1971–1989).
- Faraaz Khan, 50, Indian actor (Fareb, Mehndi, Achanak 37 Saal Baad), neurological disease.
- Benjamin LaGuer, 57, American convicted rapist, liver disease.
- Heinz Lechner, 92, Austrian Olympic fencer.
- Naomi Long Madgett, 97, American poet.
- Sergio Matteucci, 89, Italian voice actor and radio presenter.
- Tom Metzger, 82, American white supremacist, founder of White Aryan Resistance, Parkinson's disease.
- John Meyer, 78, American football player (Houston Oilers) and coach (Green Bay Packers, Boston/New England Patriots), COVID-19.
- Adam David Miller, 98, American poet and memoirist.
- Moncef Ouannes, 63–64, Tunisian sociologist, COVID-19.
- Abdul Rashid, 73, Pakistani field hockey player, Olympic champion (1968).
- Shakey Rodriguez, 67, American basketball coach (FIU Panthers), brain aneurysm.
- Mariano Francisco Saynez Mendoza, 78, Mexican admiral, secretary of the Navy (2006–2012).
- Bob Schmidt, 77, Australian footballer.
- Merle W. Schotanus, 89, American politician.
- Montinee Tangphong, 35, Thai tennis player, lymphoma.
- Matt Tees, 81, Scottish footballer (Grimsby Town, Charlton Athletic, Airdrieonians).
- Roald Tweet, 87, American academic and historian, COVID-19.
- Jean-Pierre Vincent, 78, French theatre actor and director, administrator of the Comédie-Française (1983–1986).
- Jan Vrba, 83, Czech politician, minister of industry (1990–1992), COVID-19.
- Ernest Westfield, 80, American baseball player (Birmingham Black Barons).
- Luis Zapata, 69, Mexican writer.
- Zbigniew Zysk, 70, Polish politician, deputy (1993–1997), COVID-19.

=== 5 ===
- Len Barry, 78, American singer ("1-2-3", "Bristol Stomp"), myelodysplasia.
- Alan Cairns, 80, Northern Irish clergyman and author, COVID-19.
- Vincent Coakley, 65, Irish Gaelic footballer.
- Maggie Crotty, 72, American politician, member of the Illinois Senate (2003–2009).
- François d'Harcourt, 91, French politician, Deputy (1973–1997).
- Jacques Glowinski, 84, French pharmacist, complications from COVID-19.
- David Hawkins, 86, Australian Olympic swimmer.
- Jim Marurai, 73, Cook Island politician, prime minister (2004–2010), minister of foreign affairs (2009) and MP (1994–2017).
- Barbara McAulay, 91, Australian Olympic diver (1956).
- Ouyang Zhongshi, 92, Chinese calligrapher.
- Leonid Osipov, 77, Russian water polo player, Olympic champion (1972).
- Geoffrey Palmer, 93, British actor (As Time Goes By, Butterflies, The Fall and Rise of Reginald Perrin).
- Johnny Paredes, 58, Venezuelan baseball player (Montreal Expos, Detroit Tigers), cancer.
- Robert Peterson, 83, Canadian politician, senator (2005–2012).
- Janine Puget, 93, French-born Argentine psychiatrist and psychoanalyst.
- Jim Ramstad, 74, American politician, member of the Minnesota Senate (1981–1991) and U.S. House of Representatives (1991–2009), Parkinson's disease.
- Reynaert, 65, Belgian singer ("Laissez briller le soleil"), COVID-19.
- Joseph Rishel, 80, American art curator, complications from Parkinson's disease.
- Ossi Runne, 93, Finnish trumpeter, orchestra leader and composer ("Playboy").
- Rex Rector, 69, American politician, member of the Missouri House of Representatives (2001–2007).
- Nissim Sharim, 88, Chilean actor and theater director (Julio comienza en julio, Ufa con el sexo).
- Pierre Simonet, 99, French militant and international civil servant.
- Géza Szőcs, 67, Romanian-Hungarian poet and politician, secretary of state for culture (2010–2012), COVID-19.
- Govardhan Upadhyay, 77, Indian politician, Madhya Pradesh MLA (1985–1990, 2013–2018).
- Gordon Van Wylen, 100, American physicist and academic administrator, president of Hope College (1972–1987), COVID-19.
- Joy Westmore, 88, Australian actress (Prisoner, Neighbours, Blue Heelers).

=== 6 ===
- Caprino Alendy, 68, Surinamese politician, MP (1991–2010).
- Giuseppe Amadei, 101, Italian politician, Deputy (1958–1987).
- Luis Alberto Ammann, 77, Argentine politician, Secretary-General of the Humanist Party (1984–1994, 2001–2003), complications from COVID-19.
- Mick Barry, 77, Australian rugby union player (national team), drowned.
- Jean-Michel Boris, 87, French artistic director, Director General of the Olympia (1979–2001).
- Paul Carey, 41, Irish hurler, traffic collision.
- Patrick Chokala, 72, Tanzanian diplomat, Ambassador to Russia (2002–2004), heart attack.
- Ray Daviault, 86, Canadian baseball player (New York Mets).
- Dovid Feinstein, 91, Belarusian-born American Orthodox rabbi, rosh yeshiva of the Mesivtha Tifereth Jerusalem (since 1986).
- Gene Felton, 84, American racecar driver, emphysema.
- June Foulds, 86, British athlete, Olympic silver (1956) and bronze medalist (1952).
- Jean-Michel Goudard, 80, French public relations executive (BBDO).
- Harry Holman, 62, English footballer (Exeter City, Peterborough United).
- King Von, 26, American rapper, shot.
- Mluleki Ndobe, 46, South African politician, member of the KwaZulu-Natal Legislature (since 2019), suicide by gunshot.
- Jim Neilson, 78, Canadian ice hockey player (New York Rangers).
- Andrzej Owczarek, 70, Polish politician and teacher, mayor of Łask (1990–1998), member of Senate (2005–2015), COVID-19.
- Sergey Palagin, 52, Russian military pilot and lieutenant colonel, complications from COVID-19.
- Jim Radford, 92, English folk singer-songwriter and peace activist, COVID-19.
- Luke Rhinehart, 87, American author (The Dice Man).
- Les Rohr, 74, British-born American baseball player (New York Mets).
- Timur Selçuk, 74, Turkish singer, pianist and composer ("Bana Bana").
- Bernard Sesé, 91, French academic, essayist, poet, and translator.
- Piero Simondo, 92, Italian artist.
- Shelby Smith, 93, American politician.
- Fernando Solanas, 84, Argentine film director (The Hour of the Furnaces, Tangos, the Exile of Gardel, Social Genocide) and politician, Senator (2013–2019), COVID-19.
- Ken Spears, 82, American animator and television producer (Scooby-Doo, Dynomutt, Dog Wonder, Alvin and the Chipmunks), complications from Lewy body dementia.
- Gerald Stone, 87, American-born Australian television producer (60 Minutes) and journalist.
- Constantin Dan Vasiliu, 69, Romanian politician, senator (1992–2004).
- Oliver Winterbottom, 76, British automotive designer.
- Barbara York, 71, Canadian-born American composer.
- Nathan Zach, 89, Israeli poet.
- Mikhail Zhvanetsky, 86, Ukrainian-Russian writer and satirist, People's Artist of Russia (2012).

=== 7 ===
- Adrian Cahill, 49, Irish hurler (Offaly).
- Cándido Camero, 99, Cuban jazz percussionist.
- Chung Laung Liu, 86, Chinese-born Taiwanese computer scientist.
- Cyril Colbeau-Justin, 50, French film producer (Me, Myself and Mum, The Last Deadly Mission), cancer.
- Norm Crosby, 93, American comedian and actor (Eight Crazy Nights).
- Ian Ford, 91, Welsh rugby union player.
- John Fraser, 89, Scottish actor (The Good Companions, The Trials of Oscar Wilde, Repulsion), cancer.
- Vasile Gherasim, 70, Romanian politician, mayor of Sector 1 (2000–2004) and deputy (2008–2012), COVID-19.
- Edwin Gilbert, 91, American swimmer.
- Abdelkader Guerroudj, 92, Algerian political activist.
- Henry Haller, 97, Swiss-American chef, White House Executive Chef (1966–1987).
- Bones Hillman, 62, New Zealand bassist (Midnight Oil, The Swingers, Suburban Reptiles), cancer.
- Fred Hills, 85, American literary editor, complications from prostate cancer.
- Hou Feng, 92, Chinese plant breeding engineer, member of the Chinese Academy of Engineering.
- Pierre Lataillade, 87, French politician, mayor of Arcachon (1985–2001).
- Jeanne Little, 82, Australian entertainer (The Mike Walsh Show, Cuckoo in the Nest, Beauty and the Beast).
- Rina Macrelli, 91, Italian screenwriter and essayist.
- Jean Maissant, 94, French Olympic discus thrower (1952).
- Mike McCormack, 98, American politician, member of the U.S. House of Representatives (1971–1981), Washington House of Representatives (1957–1961) and Senate (1961–1970).
- Jean-Marie Mérigoux, 82, French Roman Catholic priest.
- Sakari Paasonen, 85, Finnish Olympic shooter (1988, 1992).
- Edward J. Perkins, 92, American diplomat, ambassador to the United Nations, South Africa and Liberia.
- Jonathan Sacks, Baron Sacks, 72, British Orthodox rabbi, chief rabbi of the United Synagogue (1991–2013) and member of the House of Lords (since 2013), cancer.
- Moustafa Safouan, 99, Egyptian psychoanalyst.
- Anicetus Bongsu Antonius Sinaga, 79, Indonesian Roman Catholic prelate, archbishop of Medan (2009–2018), COVID-19.
- Willie Smith, 64, American sprinter, Olympic champion (1984).
- Song Jae-ho, 83, South Korean actor (Yeong-ja's Heydays, Memories of Murder, The President's Last Bang).
- Anatoly Mikhailovich Stepin, 80, Russian mathematician.
- Keith Talboys, 88, English cricketer.
- Sir Philip Wroughton, 86, British businessman and public servant, Lord Lieutenant of Berkshire (1995–2008).
- Yang Zhenduo, 94, Chinese martial artist.
- Vera Zima, 67, Croatian actress (Love Letters with Intent, Cashier Wants to Go to the Seaside, Sorry for Kung Fu).

=== 8 ===
- Joseph Altairac, 63, French literary critic and essayist.
- Mohammed Bakar, 75, Malaysian Olympic football player (1972), (Penang FA, national team) and manager, bone marrow failure.
- Oscar Benton, 71, Dutch vocalist ("Bensonhurst Blues").
- Herman Daled, 90, Belgian art collector.
- Horst David, 81, German serial killer.
- Paul Foshee, 88, American politician.
- Clive Griffiths, 91, Australian politician, president (1977–1997) and member (1965–1997) of the Western Australian Legislative Council.
- Raphael Hadane, 97, Ethiopian-Israeli religious leader, kahen of Beta Israel.
- Cliff Joseph, 98, Panama-born American artist.
- Alex Lasarenko, 57, American composer (Disney Channel).
- Sanchaman Limboo, 73, Indian politician, chief minister of Sikkim (1994).
- Howie Meeker, 97, Canadian Hall of Fame ice hockey player (Toronto Maple Leafs), commentator (HNIC) and politician, MP (1951–1953), four-time Stanley Cup champion.
- Marc Metdepenningen, 62, Belgian journalist.
- Stéphane Moulin, 57, French football referee.
- Chuck Mrazovich, 96, American basketball player (Anderson Packers, Indianapolis Olympians).
- Jean-Yves Nau, 68, French physician and scientific journalist.
- Richard Neely, 79, American jurist, justice of the Supreme Court of Appeals of West Virginia (1973–1995), liver cancer.
- Bernard L. Shaw, 90, English chemist.
- Heidar Shonjani, 74, Iranian Olympic swimmer (1964) and water polo player (1976).
- Ataullah Siddiqui, 66, Indian-born British scholar of Islam, cancer.
- Miro Steržaj, 87, Slovene nine-pin bowler, businessman and politician, mayor of Ljutomer (1988–1992).
- Seymour Topping, 98, American journalist (The New York Times), stroke.
- Alex Trebek, 80, Canadian-American game show host (Jeopardy!, High Rollers, Classic Concentration), seven-time Emmy winner, pancreatic cancer.
- Víctor Valencia de los Santos, 61, Mexican politician, deputy (2006–2008), COVID-19.
- Carlos G. Vallés, 95, Spanish-Indian Jesuit priest and author.
- Vanusa, 73, Brazilian singer.
- Andrzej Wawrzyniak, 88, Polish diplomat and art collector.

=== 9 ===
- Don Alley, 75, American football player (Baltimore Colts, Pittsburgh Steelers).
- W. D. Ariyasinghe, 64, Sri Lankan musician.
- Fernando Atzori, 78, Italian boxer, Olympic champion (1964).
- Bruno Barbey, 79, Moroccan-born French photographer.
- Bert Belasco, 38, American actor (Let's Stay Together, Pitch, I'm Dying Up Here).
- Virginia Bonci, 71, Romanian Olympic athlete (1968).
- Pierre Candelo, 86, French Olympic sport shooter.
- Foster Castleman, 89, American baseball player (New York Giants, Baltimore Orioles).
- Vasıf Çetinel, 91–92, Turkish Olympic footballer.
- Daryono, 26, Indonesian footballer (Persija Jakarta, Badak Lampung), dengue fever.
- Charles M. Eastman, 80, American architect.
- Glenn Ezell, 76, American baseball executive (Detroit Tigers) and coach (Texas Rangers, Kansas City Royals).
- Domènec Fita i Molat, 93, Spanish painter and sculptor.
- Charles-Henri Flammarion, 74, French literary editor.
- Tom Heinsohn, 86, American Hall of Fame basketball player, coach, and broadcaster (Boston Celtics), NBA Champion (1957, 1959–1965, 1974, 1976).
- Israel Horovitz, 81, American playwright and screenwriter (Author! Author!, Sunshine, James Dean).
- Harry R. Jackson Jr., 67, American Christian preacher and Pentecostal bishop.
- Thomas J. Jochum, 68, American politician.
- Gordon Joseloff, 75, American journalist (CBS News), myelofibrosis.
- John Kinsela, 70, Australian Olympic wrestler (1968, 1972).
- Robert Layton, 90, English musicologist and music critic.
- Lawrence LeShan, 100, American psychologist, educator and author.
- Lê Dinh, 86, Vietnamese-Canadian songwriter.
- Edward McClain, 80, American politician, member of the Alabama Senate (1995–2009).
- C. Moyinkutty, 77, Indian politician, Kerala MLA (1996–2016), liver disease.
- Dan Pfister, 83, American baseball player (Kansas City Athletics).
- Shannen Rossmiller, 50, American judge and online terrorist-hunter, complications from Graves' disease.
- Marco Santagata, 73, Italian writer and academic, COVID-19.
- Eleanor Schano, 88, American journalist, COVID-19.
- Howard P. Segal, 72, American historian of technology.
- Amadou Toumani Touré, 72, Malian politician, president (1991–1992, 2002–2012).
- Shkëlqim Troplini, 54, Albanian Olympic wrestler (1996), COVID-19.
- William G. T. Tuttle Jr., 84, American general.
- Doug Wragg, 86, English footballer (Rochdale, West Ham United, Mansfield Town).
- Basil Yamey, 101, South African economist.
- Daniel Yonnet, 87, French journalist and literary critic.

=== 10 ===
- Nagima Aitkhozhina, 74, Kazakh biologist.
- Ghasem Amiryavari, 88, Iranian Olympic boxer (1960).
- Hanane Al-Barassi, 46, Libyan anti-corruption and women's rights activist, shot.
- Alec Baillie, American bassist (Choking Victim, Leftöver Crack).
- Carlo Bordini, 82, Italian poet.
- Charles Corver, 84, Dutch football referee.
- Graham Cowdrey, 56, English cricketer (Kent).
- Dino da Costa, 89, Brazilian-born Italian footballer (Botafogo, Roma, Italy national team).
- Jerzy Derkacz, 70, Polish politician, senator (1993–1997).
- DJ Spinbad, 46, American DJ (WHTZ) and record producer.
- Harold Edwards, 84, American mathematician, colon cancer.
- Saeb Erekat, 65, Palestinian politician and diplomat (Oslo Accords), MP (since 1996) and secretary-general of the PLO (since 2015), COVID-19.
- Clayton Fiscus, 84, American politician.
- Renzo Gattegna, 81, Italian lawyer, president of the Union of Italian Jewish Communities (2006–2016), COVID-19.
- Vladimir Găitan, 73, Romanian actor (The Reenactment, Accident, Uncle Marin, the Billionaire), cancer.
- Sen-itiroh Hakomori, 91, Japanese-American biochemist.
- Bob Hantla, 89, American football player (San Francisco 49ers, BC Lions).
- Luis Ibero, 71, Spanish politician, COVID-19.
- Bede Lackner, 92, Hungarian-American priest and monk.
- Igor Moskvin, 91, Russian figure skating coach.
- Ba Ag Moussa, Malian militant and jihadist, shot.
- Günther Pfaff, 81, Austrian canoeist, Olympic bronze medalist (1968).
- Isidro Pedraza Chávez, 61, Mexican politician, senator (2006–2009, 2012–2015), COVID-19.
- Mahadeepak Singh Shakya, 98, Indian politician, MP (1977–1998).
- Juan Sol, 73, Spanish footballer (Valencia, Real Madrid, national team).
- Mila del Sol, 97, Filipino actress (Giliw Ko, Ibong Adarna).
- Rahayu Supanggah, 71, Indonesian composer.
- Russell T. Thane, 94, American politician.
- Carlo Vitrano, 82, Italian Olympic wrestler.
- Tony Waiters, 83, English football player (Blackpool, national team) and manager (Plymouth Argyle).
- Mike Whorf, 88, American radio personality.
- Sven Wollter, 86, Swedish actor (The Sacrifice, The Man on the Roof, A Song for Martin), COVID-19.
- Mahmoud Yavari, 81, Iranian football player (PAS Tehran, national team) and manager (Tractor).

=== 11 ===
- Heinfried Birlenbach, 79, German Olympic shot putter.
- Mongameli Bobani, 52, South African politician, mayor of Nelson Mandela Bay (2018–2019), COVID-19.
- Carlos Campos, 83, Chilean footballer (Universidad de Chile, national team), respiratory failure.
- Shegufta Bakht Chaudhuri, 86, Bangladeshi economist, governor of Bangladesh Bank (1987–1992).
- Francesc-Xavier Ciuraneta Aymí, 80, Spanish Roman Catholic prelate, bishop of Menorca (1991–1999) and Lleida (1999–2007).
- Justin Cronin, 40, American politician, member of the South Dakota House of Representatives (2009–2019).
- Jean Collet, 88, French writer.
- Marian Cooksey, 77, American politician.
- Titus Davis, 27, American football player (Central Michigan Chippewas), renal medullary carcinoma.
- Charles DeJurnett, 68, American football player (San Diego Chargers, Los Angeles Rams), cancer.
- Dai Edwards, 92, Welsh computer engineer.
- Edward Flak, 72, Polish lawyer and German minority politician, mayor of Olesno (1990–1994, 1998–2006), member of the Sejm (1992–1993).
- Juan Gómez-Quiñones, 80, Mexican-born American historian.
- Rosalind Grimshaw, 75, English stained glass artist.
- Dame Margaret Guilfoyle, 94, Northern Irish-born Australian politician, senator (1971–1987), minister for finance (1980–1983) and social security (1975–1980).
- Edmund Jagiełło, 73, Polish physician and politician, member of the Sejm (1989–1991), senator (1991–1993).
- Khalifa bin Salman Al Khalifa, 84, Bahraini royal and politician, prime minister (since 1970).
- Valentin Khromov, 86, Russian poet.
- Mark Kosmos, 75, American football player (Ottawa Rough Riders).
- Mileta Lisica, 54, Serbian-Slovene basketball player (Sloboda Tuzla, Crvena zvezda, Pivovarna Laško).
- Jorge Llopart, 68, Spanish race walker, Olympic silver medallist (1980), heart attack.
- Robert Lue, 56, Jamaican biologist, cancer.
- Anthony Lukeman, 87, American lieutenant general.
- Thembekile Kimi Makwetu, 54, South African accountant, auditor-general (since 2013), lung cancer.
- André Martin, 91, French particle physicist.
- Les Massie, 85, Scottish footballer (Huddersfield Town).
- Giuliana Minuzzo, 88, Italian alpine skier, Olympic bronze medallist (1952, 1960).
- MO3, 28, American rapper, shot.
- Michel Mongeau, 74, Canadian actor (How My Mother Gave Birth to Me During Menopause, Gaz Bar Blues, Shake Hands with the Devil).
- Reg Morelli, 84, American-Canadian ice hockey player (North Dakota Fighting Hawks).
- Abdulkadir Balarabe Musa, 84, Nigerian politician, governor of Kaduna State (1979–1981).
- Netatua Pelesikoti, Tongan environmentalist.
- Heinz Schaub, 92, Swiss Olympic diver.
- Jude Stéfan, 90, French poet.
- Theresa Stewart, 90, English politician, Lord Mayor of Birmingham (2000–2001).
- Mark Stockman, 73, Ukrainian-born American physicist.
- Gonçalo Ribeiro Telles, 98, Portuguese landscape architect and politician, co-founder of the People's Monarchist Party and the Earth Party.
- Faye Urban, 75, Canadian tennis player.
- Marie-Claude Vayssade, 84, French politician, MEP (1979–1994).
- Andrew White, 78, American jazz saxophonist and musicologist.

=== 12 ===
- Asif Basra, 53, Indian actor (Outsourced, One Night with the King, Once Upon a Time in Mumbaai), suicide by hanging.
- Patrick Bassey, 62, Nigerian Olympic weightlifter.
- William T. Beaver, 87, American medical researcher and educator, complications of COVID-19.
- Tommy Butler, 69, Irish hurler.
- Wolfgang Engelmann, 78, German politician, MP (1990–1998).
- Walter J. Gex III, 81, American jurist, judge of the U.S. District Court for Southern Mississippi (since 1986).
- Alan Glazier, 81, English darts player.
- Boris Gurevich, 83, Ukrainian wrestler, Olympic champion (1968).
- Michael Z. Hobson, 83, American comic book publisher (Marvel Comics).
- Kanybek Isakov, 51, Kyrgyz politician and academic, COVID-19.
- Surendra Singh Jeena, 50, Indian politician, Uttarakhand MLA (since 2007), COVID-19.
- Nelly Kaplan, 89, Argentine-born French film director (A Very Curious Girl) and screenwriter, COVID-19.
- Lynn Kellogg, 77, American singer and actress (Hair, Charro!), COVID-19.
- Masatoshi Koshiba, 94, Japanese physicist, Nobel Prize laureate (2002).
- Jacob M. Landau, 96, Israeli political scientist.
- Villem Lüüs, 49, Estonian draughts player and judge.
- Tibor Méray, 96, Hungarian journalist and writer (Catch Me a Spy).
- Jack Michael, 94, American psychologist.
- Marc Monchal, 85, French army general.
- John Outterbridge, 87, American sculptor and activist.
- Piem, 97, French designer.
- Leonid Potapov, 85, Russian politician, president of Buryatia (1994–2007), COVID-19.
- Arjun Prajapati, 63, Indian pottery artist, Padma Shri (2010), COVID-19.
- Dave Quall, 84, American politician, member of the Washington House of Representatives (1993–2011).
- Albert Quixall, 87, English footballer (Sheffield Wednesday, Manchester United, national team).
- Jerry Rawlings, 73, Ghanaian politician, president (1979, 1981–2001), COVID-19.
- C. Richard Robins, 90, American academic.
- Gernot Roll, 81, German cinematographer (The Last Escape, Zero Hour, Beyond Silence) and film director.
- Krasnodar Rora, 75, Croatian football player (Dinamo Zagreb, Yugoslavia national team) and manager (NK Radnik Velika Gorica).
- Paul Schrieber, 54, American baseball umpire, brain hemorrhage.
- Guy-Olivier Segond, 75, Swiss politician, member of the Swiss national council (1987–1990).
- Waqar Ahmed Seth, 59, Pakistani jurist, justice (since 2011) and chief justice (since 2018) of the Peshawar High Court, COVID-19.
- Quentin Smith, 68, American philosopher.
- Aldo Tambellini, 90, Italian-American artist, complications from surgery.
- Sakata Tōjūrō IV, 88, Japanese kabuki actor.
- Howie Winter, 91, American mobster (Winter Hill Gang), heart attack.

=== 13 ===
- Mohammad Ali, 76, Bangladeshi politician, MP (1996–2001).
- Thomas J. Allen, 89, American organizational theorist.
- Vidin Apostolov, 79, Bulgarian footballer (Lokomotiv Sofia, Botev Plovdiv, national team).
- Eliza Jane Ashley, 103, American chef and author.
- Ravi Belagere, 62, Indian journalist (Hai Bangalore, O Manase), heart attack.
- Robert Byron Bird, 96, American chemical engineer.
- Rik Boel, 89, Belgian politician and judge, minister of the interior (1977–1979).
- João Cunha, 81, Brazilian politician, deputy (1975–1991).
- Terry Duerod, 64, American basketball player (Boston Celtics, Detroit Pistons, Dallas Mavericks), NBA champion (1981), leukemia.
- Ollie Hall, 68, Australian actor (Quigley Down Under, Dead End Drive-In, Mad Max Beyond Thunderdome) and rugby union player.
- József Halzl, 86, Hungarian mechanical engineer, co-founder of the Hungarian Democratic Forum and CEO of MVM Group (1991–1994).
- Mohand Chérif Hannachi, 70, Algerian football player (national team) and executive.
- John Hays, 71, British travel agency executive, founder of Hays Travel.
- Noah Hershkowitz, 79, American physicist.
- Paul Hornung, 84, American Hall of Fame football player (Green Bay Packers), Super Bowl champion (1966), Heisman Trophy winner (1956), complications from dementia.
- Attila Horváth, 53, Hungarian Olympic discus thrower (1992, 1996), COVID-19.
- Konrad Hünteler, 73, German flutist.
- Abiola Félix Iroko, 73–74, Beninese historian and university professor.
- Roger Jepsen, 91, American politician, member of the U.S. Senate (1979–1985) and Iowa Senate (1966–1968), Lt. Governor of Iowa (1969–1973).
- Kjartan Jóhannsson, 80, Icelandic diplomat and politician, minister of fisheries (1978–1980) and of commerce (1979–1980).
- Gwyn Jones, 85, Welsh footballer (Wolverhampton Wanderers, Bristol Rovers).
- Jay Kerttula, 92, American politician, member (1961–1963, 1965–1973) and speaker (1969–1971) of the Alaska House of Representatives, member (1973–1995) and president (1981–1985) of the Alaska Senate.
- Jam Madad Ali Khan, 57, Pakistani politician, Sindh MPA (since 2008), COVID-19.
- Akira Kubodera, 43, Japanese actor (Pretty Guardian Sailor Moon, Kamen Rider Blade, Kamen Rider Kiva), suicide.
- Halina Kwiatkowska, 99, Polish actress (Ashes and Diamonds, The Doll, And Along Come Tourists).
- Anastasios Lordos, 70, Cypriot sports shooter.
- Pierre Mercier, 83, Canadian politician.
- Walter C. Miller, 94, American television producer (Grammy Awards).
- Jean Morzadec, 67, French singer-songwriter and media director.
- Alfred Muller, 79, French politician, deputy (1993–1997) and mayor of Schiltigheim (1977–2008).
- Jim Pace, 59, American racing driver, complications from COVID-19.
- Pat Pariseau, 84, American politician, complications from dementia.
- Louis Rostollan, 84, French racing cyclist.
- Andrzej Prawda, 69, Polish football manager (Victoria Sulejówek, Odra Opole), COVID-19.
- Kićo Slabinac, 76, Croatian pop singer ("Tvoj dječak je tužan").
- Henry Slaughter, 93, American gospel pianist, complications from COVID-19.
- Doug Supernaw, 60, American country musician ("I Don't Call Him Daddy", "Reno", "Not Enough Hours in the Night"), lung and bladder cancer.
- Peter Sutcliffe, 74, English serial killer, complications of COVID-19.
- Vladimír Székely, 79, Hungarian electrical engineer.
- Sir John Meurig Thomas, 87, Welsh chemist and academic administrator, Director of the Royal Institution (1986–1991).
- Jan van Toorn, 88, Dutch graphic designer.
- Julio Videla, 76, Chilean radio and television presenter.
- Philip Voss, 84, British actor (Vicious, Doctor Who, Fish), cancer and COVID-19.
- Made Wianta, 70, Indonesian painter.
- Günther Wirth, 87, German footballer.

=== 14 ===
- Jay E. Adams, 91, American religious author, founder of Nouthetic counseling.
- Osmo Ala-Honkola, 81, Finnish Olympic shooter (1968, 1972).
- Robert Brown, 85, American politician.
- Adolfo Bolea, 87, Spanish football player (Sant Andreu, Tenerife, Cádiz) and manager.
- Sydney Chandrasekara, 61, Sri Lankan journalist.
- Frederick B. Chary, 81, American historian, complications from COVID-19.
- Lamin N. Dibba, Gambian politician.
- Gerald Nicholas Dino, 80, American Ruthenian Greek Catholic hierarch, eparch of the Holy Protection of Mary of Phoenix (2008–2016).
- Armen Dzhigarkhanyan, 85, Armenian-Russian actor (The New Adventures of the Elusive Avengers, The Crown of the Russian Empire, The Meeting Place Cannot Be Changed).
- Peter Florjančič, 101, Slovenian inventor.
- Jacques Fornier, 94, French theatrical actor and director.
- Barbara Granlund, 92, American politician.
- Don Heckman, 89, American music critic, music journalist, jazz saxophonist, composer, screenwriter, and clinical psychologist
- Max Gros-Louis, 89, Canadian politician, grand chief of the Huron-Wendat Nation (1964–1984, 1994–2008).
- Greg Growden, 60, Australian sports journalist and author, cancer.
- János Gróz, 49, Hungarian handball and beach handball coach, COVID-19.
- Charlie Hauck, 79, American television producer and writer (The Hogan Family, Maude, Frasier), pancreatic cancer.
- James Haynes, 60, American football player (New Orleans Saints).
- Abu Hena, Bangladeshi politician, MP (1996–2006), COVID-19.
- Maria Kalinowska, 75, Polish filmgoer.
- Lindy McDaniel, 84, American baseball player (St. Louis Cardinals, New York Yankees, Chicago Cubs), COVID-19.
- Hasan Muratović, 80, Bosnian politician, prime minister (1996–1997) and minister of foreign trade (1997–1999), COVID-19.
- Rae Norman, 62, American actress (The Young and the Restless).
- Des O'Connor, 88, English television presenter (The Des O'Connor Show, Des O'Connor Tonight), comedian and singer ("I Pretend"), complications from a fall.
- Peter Pagé, 81, German computer scientist.
- Kailash Sarang, 85, Indian politician, MP.
- Terry A. Simmons, 74, Canadian-American lawyer and environmental activist.
- David Stoddart, Baron Stoddart of Swindon, 94, British politician, MP (1970–1983) and member of the House of Lords (since 1983).
- Isa Stoppi, 79, Italian fashion model.
- William Thomas Jr., 73, American actor (Frank's Place, The Cosby Show).
- António Valverde Martins, 85, Portuguese politician and trade unionist, Deputy (1978).
- Frederick Whatley, 96, English botanist and biochemist.
- Kay Wiestål, 80, Swedish entrepreneur (Victoria Day) and footballer (Djurgårdens IF), COVID-19.

=== 15 ===
- Mahjoubi Aherdane, 99, Moroccan politician.
- Carlos Amadeu, 55, Brazilian football player (Bahia) and manager (Vitória, Al Hilal), heart attack.
- Frank Butler, 92, American businessman, founder of Catalina Yachts.
- Chandrawati, 92, Indian politician, MP (1977–1979), COVID-19.
- Soumitra Chatterjee, 85, Indian actor (The World of Apu, Abhijan, Rupkatha Noy), complications from COVID-19.
- Ray Clemence, 72, English footballer (Liverpool, Tottenham Hotspur, national team), prostate cancer.
- Henrique Córdova, 81, Brazilian politician, governor of Santa Catarina (1982–1983), complications from COVID-19.
- Egidio Cosentino, 93, Italian Olympic field hockey player (1952).
- Drew S. Days III, 79, American lawyer and academic, U.S. Solicitor General (1993–1996).
- Cecil Duckworth, 83, British businessman and charity executive.
- Campbell Forsyth, 86, Scottish footballer (St. Mirren, Kilmarnock).
- Mary Fowkes, 66, American physician and neuropathologist, heart attack.
- Herbert Freeman, 94, American computer scientist.
- Yairus Gwijangge, 51, Indonesian politician, regent of Nduga (since 2011).
- Chris Hurford, 89, Australian politician, minister for immigration (1984–1987) and MP (1969–1987).
- Rudolf Kippenhahn, 94, German astrophysicist.
- Richard Kosolapov, 90, Russian social philosopher and journalist.
- Anto Kovačević, 68, Croatian politician, MP (2000–2003), COVID-19.
- Ivan Kožarić, 99, Croatian artist.
- Leon Claire Metz, 90, American cultural historian, complications from COVID-19.
- Kyle Morrell, 57, American football player (Minnesota Vikings), complications from amyotrophic lateral sclerosis.
- Fred Morrison, 94, American football player (Chicago Bears, Cleveland Browns), complications from a broken hip.
- Victor Popa, 71, Moldovan jurist and politician, deputy (2010–2013) and justice of the Constitutional Court (since 2013).
- Anne Rasa, 80, British-South African ethologist.
- Jacques Rifflet, 91, Belgian writer and political scientist.
- Witold Sadowy, 100, Polish actor (Zakazane piosenki, Bad Luck).
- Mohammad Sozib, 21, Bangladeshi cricketer (Shinepukur), suicide.
- Anthony Stewart, 50, American basketball coach (UT Martin Skyhawks).
- Ioannis Tassias, 62, Greek Orthodox metropolitan, COVID-19.
- Norman Taylor, 55, American-born Australian basketball player (Illawarra Hawks), heart attack.
- Ivan Vandor, 88, Italian composer (The Passenger, Django Kill... If You Live, Shoot!) and musician (Musica Elettronica Viva).
- Raúl Eduardo Vela Chiriboga, 86, Ecuadorian Roman Catholic cardinal, bishop of Azogues (1975–1989), military ordinary of Ecuador (1989–2003) and archbishop of Quito (2003–2010).
- Marvin Zonis, 84, American political economist.

=== 16 ===
- Shawkat Ali, 83, Bangladeshi politician, MP (1979–1986, 1991–2014).
- Lanie Black, 73, American politician, member of the Missouri House of Representatives (1998–2006).
- Dairon Blanco, 28, Cuban footballer (Las Tunas, national team), traffic collision.
- Eddie Borysewicz, 81, Polish-American cycling coach, complications of COVID-19.
- Jim Bradford, 87, American politician.
- David Carter, 92, British industrial designer.
- Raul del Mar, 79, Filipino politician, member (1987–1998, 2001–2010, since 2013) and deputy speaker (2004–2010) of the House of Representatives.
- Ian Finkel, 72, American musician, author and entertainer, complications from COVID-19.
- Rick Fraser, 66, Canadian ice hockey player (Indianapolis Racers), cancer.
- Antonis Georgiadis, 87, Greek football manager (AEK Athens, Olympiacos, national team).
- Henryk Gulbinowicz, 97, Polish Roman Catholic cardinal, archbishop of Wrocław (1976–2004).
- Eric Hall, 73, English football and music agent, COVID-19.
- David Hemblen, 79, English-born Canadian actor (X-Men: The Animated Series, The Sweet Hereafter, Tommy Boy).
- Georg Kandlinger, 71, German Olympic cross-country skier.
- Alfred Laureta, 96, American jurist, judge of the District Court for the Northern Mariana Islands (1978–1988).
- Bhanwarlal Meghwal, 72, Indian politician, Rajasthan MLA (since 2018), brain haemorrhage.
- Tomislav Merčep, 68, Croatian politician, convicted war criminal and paramilitary, founder of the Croatian Popular Party.
- Bill Morgan, 80, Australian-born Canadian journalist and television producer (CBC News).
- Walid Muallem, 79, Syrian diplomat, minister of foreign affairs (since 2006), deputy prime minister (since 2012) and ambassador to the United States (1990–2000).
- Hani Naser, 70, Jordanian-born American musician.
- Sheila Nelson, 84, English string teacher.
- Joe Núñez, 83, American politician, member of the Colorado House of Representatives (1998–2002), complications from COVID-19.
- John Nurser, 91, English priest and theologian.
- Paul Platero, 78, American Navajo linguist.
- Tulsi Ram, 76, Indian politician, Himachal Pradesh MLA (1990–1993, 1998–2003, 2007–2012), kidney disease.
- Eugenia Ratti, 87, Italian operatic soprano.
- William F. Riordan, 79, American lawyer and jurist, justice (1981–1986) and chief justice (1986) of the New Mexico Supreme Court.
- Bruce Swedien, 86, American audio engineer and producer, Grammy winner (1983, 1987, 1990, 1992, 1996).
- Harry van Raaij, 84, Dutch football executive, chairman of PSV Eindhoven (1996–2004).
- Rudolph H. Weingartner, 93, German-born American philosopher.
- Clark Williams, 78, American politician, member of the North Dakota House of Representatives (1983–1987, 2001–2015).
- Art Wolff, 82, American television director (Seinfeld, The Tracey Ullman Show, Grand) and acting coach, heart failure.

=== 17 ===
- Camille Bonnet, 102, French rugby union player (SU Agen Lot-et-Garonne, Sporting Club Graulhetois), COVID-19.
- Angelo Caroli, 83, Italian footballer (Juventus, Catania, Lucchese) and journalist.
- Malcolm CasSelle, 50, American businessman.
- William A. Clemens Jr., 88, American paleontologist.
- Alokeranjan Dasgupta, 87, Indian poet.
- Walt Davis, 89, American basketball player (Philadelphia Warriors, St. Louis Hawks) and high jumper, Olympic champion (1952).
- Pim Doesburg, 77, Dutch footballer (Feyenoord, PSV Eindhoven, Sparta Rotterdam).
- Stanisław Dulias, 81, Polish politician and economist, deputy (2001–2005), COVID-19.
- Robert L. Farmer, 87, American judge and politician.
- Gordon Keith, 81, American record producer.
- Royal Kobayashi, 71, Japanese Olympic boxer.
- Willy Kuijpers, 83, Belgian politician, MP (1971–1984), MEP (1984–1989), senator (1989–1995), mayor of Herent (1995–2012), COVID-19.
- Kay Morley, 100, American actress (Campus Honeymoon, Six-Gun Serenade, Trails End).
- Eitaro Okano, 90, Japanese Olympic sprinter (1952), subarachnoid hemorrhage.
- Napane Pemasiri Thera, 98, Sri Lankan Buddhist clergy, maha nayaka of Rāmañña Nikāya (since 2012).
- Manis Muka Mohd Darah, 66, Malaysian politician, member of Sabah State Legislative Assembly (since 2018).
- John Poole, 87, English footballer (Port Vale, Macclesfield Town).
- Jean-Ernest Ramez, 88, French Olympic fencer (1964, 1968).
- Vincent Reffet, 36, French BASE jumper, wingsuit flyer and jetpack pilot, training accident.
- Anneliese Schuh-Proxauf, 98, Austrian Olympic skier (1948).
- Anjum Singh, 53, Indian artist, cancer.
- Jagmohan Singh, 88, Indian Olympic hurdler (1960), heart attack.
- Paul Sobol, 94, Belgian Holocaust survivor and educator.
- Sheldon Solow, 92, American real estate developer, lymphoma.
- Skip Sweetser, 84, American Olympic rower.
- Roman Viktyuk, 84, Russian theater director, People's Artist of Ukraine (2006) and Russia (2009), complications from COVID-19.
- Audrey Walker, 92, British textile artist.

=== 18 ===
- Göran Andersson, 81, Swedish Olympic sailor (1960).
- Claire Boudreau, 55, Canadian genealogist, historian, and chief herald of Canada (2007–2020), cancer.
- Iwannis Louis Awad, 86, Syrian Syriac Catholic hierarch, apostolic exarch of Venezuela (2003–2011).
- Jim Brandt, 91, American football player (Pittsburgh Steelers, Montreal Alouettes), injuries sustained in a fall.
- Mel Brez, 84, American television writer (The Doctors, As the World Turns, Days of Our Lives), complications from Parkinson's disease.
- George Carter, 74, American basketball player (Detroit Pistons, Virginia Squires, New York Nets).
- Rex Downing, 95, American actor (Wuthering Heights, Mandrake the Magician, Blood and Sand).
- Alexander Dubyanskiy, 79, Russian Tamil scholar, COVID-19.
- Umar Ghalib, 90, Somali politician, prime minister (1991–1993) and minister of foreign affairs (1969–1976).
- Mokhtar Hashim, 78, Malaysian politician, minister of culture (1981–1983) and youth and sports (1981–1983).
- Tony Hooper, 81, English guitarist (Strawbs).
- Arthur Imperatore Sr., 95, American transportation executive and hockey team owner (Colorado Rockies), founder of the NY Waterway.
- Leonard Kamsler, 85, American golf photographer, organ failure.
- Christine Barkhuizen le Roux, 61, South African writer.
- Draga Olteanu Matei, 87, Romanian actress (The Famous Paparazzo, Uncle Marin, the Billionaire, Explosion), gastrointestinal hemorrhage.
- Kirby Morrow, 47, Canadian voice actor (Dragon Ball Z, Inuyasha, Ninjago), complications from substance abuse.
- Adam Musiał, 71, Polish football player (Wisła Kraków, national team) and manager (Stal Stalowa Wola).
- Michel Robin, 90, French actor (Farewell, My Queen, The Triplets of Belleville, Just a Breath Away), COVID-19.
- Marguerite Ray, 89, American actress (The Young and the Restless, Sanford and Son).
- Juan Roldán, 63, Argentine middleweight boxer, COVID-19.
- Esko Silvennoinen, 89, Finnish Olympic field hockey player (1952).
- Mridula Sinha, 77, Indian politician, governor of Goa (2014–2019).
- Firsat Sofi, 42, Iraqi politician, governor of Erbil (since 2019), COVID-19.
- Janusz Turowski, 93, Polish electrical engineer, deputy rector of Łódź University of Technology (1990–1996).
- John Craig Wallace, 92, Northern Irish horticulturalist and writer.
- James Wasserman, 72, American author.

=== 19 ===
- Kim Border, 68, American behavioral economist.
- Michael J. Budds, 73, American musicologist.
- Sebouh Chouldjian, 61, Turkish-born Armenian Apostolic prelate, archbishop of Gougark (since 1996), COVID-19.
- Ted Carpenter, 68, American politician, member of the Arizona House of Representatives (1999–2007).
- Felim Egan, 68, Irish painter.
- Manvel Grigoryan, 64, Armenian military officer and politician, deputy (2012–2018).
- Digamber Hansda, 81, Indian Santhali linguist and tribal rights advocate.
- Hwawei Ko, 68, Taiwanese pedagogue and professor.
- Reşit Karabacak, 66, Turkish Olympic wrestler (1984), COVID-19.
- Charles Levin, 94, American jurist, justice of the Michigan Supreme Court (1973–1996).
- Helen Morgan, 54, Welsh field hockey player, Olympic bronze medallist (1992), cancer.
- Ramsay G. Najjar, 68, Lebanese business executive and writer, complications from COVID-19.
- Dumitru Noroc, 87, Moldovan doctor and politician, deputy (1990–1994).
- Henry Ward Oxendine, 80, American politician.
- Hayford Peirce, 78, American science fiction author, suicide by gunshot.
- Roger J. Phillips, 80, American geophysicist, complications from Parkinson's disease.
- Alcino Pinto, 64, São Toméan politician, president of the National Assembly (2012–2014).
- William C. Pryor, 88, American jurist, judge (1979–2019) and chief judge (1984–1988) of the District of Columbia Court of Appeals.
- André Quilis, 79, French rugby union player (RC Narbonne, national team) and coach.
- Harald Ringstorff, 81, German politician.
- Khadim Hussain Rizvi, 54, Pakistani Islamic preacher, founder of Tehreek-e-Labbaik Pakistan.
- Michal Šafařík, 43, Slovak ice hockey player (HC Slovan Bratislava), traffic collision.
- Jake Scott, 75, American football player (Miami Dolphins, Washington Redskins), Super Bowl champion (1973, 1974), Super Bowl MVP (1973), complications from a fall.
- João Alberto Silveira Freitas, 40, Brazilian painter, asphyxiation.
- Herbert F. Solow, 89, American television producer (Man from Atlantis).
- Stan Trafford, 74, English footballer (Port Vale, Macclesfield Town) and cricketer (Staffordshire).
- Gennady Zdanovich, 82, Russian archaeologist.

=== 20 ===
- Antonio Ambrosetti, 75, Italian mathematician, discoverer of the mountain pass theorem.
- Patricia Beatty, 84, Canadian choreographer and dancer.
- Jorge Horacio Brito, 68, Argentine banker, CEO of Banco Macro (since 1988), helicopter crash.
- Michael Brooks, 85, British music historian and archivist.
- Ronald Bullough, 89, British materials scientist.
- Ernesto Canto, 61, Mexican race walker, Olympic champion (1984).
- Daniel Cordier, 100, French militant, historian, and art dealer.
- Marian Cycoń, 80, Polish politician, deputy (1997–2001, 2011–2015), mayor of Nowy Sącz (1988–1990) and Stary Sącz (1995–1998, 2002–2011).
- Jean Darnel, 96–97, French actor and director.
- Rudy del Rosario, 51, Filipino football player (Kaya, national team) and manager.
- Jacques Déprez, 82, French Olympic hurdler (1960).
- Ajay Desai, 63, Indian wildlife expert, cardiac arrest.
- Sandy Dvore, 86, American graphic designer, bone cancer.
- Mony Elkaïm, 79, Moroccan-Belgian psychiatrist and psychotherapist.
- June Furlong, 90, English model.
- Tony Gershlick, 69, British cardiologist, COVID-19.
- Saverio Imperato, 85, Italian immunologist.
- Irinej, 90, Serbian Orthodox prelate, patriarch of the Church (since 2010), COVID-19.
- Hannu Lahtinen, 60, Finnish Olympic wrestler (1984), complications from amyotrophic lateral sclerosis.
- Jan Morris, 94, Welsh historian (Pax Britannica Trilogy), novelist (Last Letters from Hav) and travel writer.
- Murman Omanidze, 82, Georgian politician, acting prime minister (1991), minister of foreign affairs (1991) and MP (1992–1998), COVID-19.
- Deb Price, 62, American journalist, pioneering lesbian columnist.
- František Reichel, 82, Czech politician, deputy prime minister of Czechoslovakia (1989–1990).
- Jos Rosa, 94, Belgian Olympic rower.
- John Rowland, 79, English footballer (Nottingham Forest, Port Vale, Mansfield Town).
- Albert Salomon, 85, Bulgarian-Israeli accordionist and social activist.
- Rita Sargsyan, 58, Armenian music teacher and socialite, first lady (2008–2018), COVID-19.
- Ken Schinkel, 87, Canadian ice hockey player (New York Rangers, Pittsburgh Penguins).
- Judith Jarvis Thomson, 91, American moral philosopher.
- Takao Yaguchi, 81, Japanese manga artist (Fisherman Sanpei), pancreatic cancer.

=== 21 ===
- Chen Ailian, 80, Chinese dancer, stomach cancer.
- C. K. Bhaskaran, 79, Indian cricketer (Kerala, Madras), cancer.
- Dena Dietrich, 91, American actress (Adam's Rib, Friends and Lovers, The Wild Party).
- Khalil el-Moumni, 79, Moroccan imam, COVID-19.
- Oliver Friggieri, 73, Maltese poet, writer and philosopher.
- Edgar García, 60, Colombian bullfighter, COVID-19.
- Robert Garland, 87, American screenwriter (No Way Out, The Electric Horseman, The Big Blue), complications from dementia.
- Sandy Harbutt, 79, Australian actor, director and writer.
- Léon Herschtritt, 84, French photographer.
- Jery Hewitt, 71, American actor (The Warriors) and stuntman.
- Alvin Holmes, 81, American politician, member of the Alabama House of Representatives (1974–2018).
- Htike Zaw, 53, Burmese politician, shot.
- Jacques Jurquet, 98, French political activist.
- Donal Leace, 81, American singer-songwriter, musician and educator, COVID-19.
- Alan Lidiard, 92, British condensed matter physicist.
- Malcolm Marmorstein, 92, American screenwriter and film director (Pete's Dragon, Love Bites, Dark Shadows).
- Margaret Nosek, 68, American academic and disability rights activist.
- John O'Brien, 75, Irish-American publisher.
- Devi Priya, 71, Indian poet and political satirist.
- Artemije Radosavljević, 85, Serbian Orthodox prelate, eparch of Raška and Prizren (1991–2010), COVID-19.
- Eva Rohmann, 76, German politician, member of the Volkskammer (1981–1990) and chairwoman of the Democratic Women's League of Germany (1989–1990).
- Jožef Smej, 98, Slovenian Roman Catholic prelate, auxiliary bishop of Maribor (1983–2009).
- Jens Sørensen, 79, Danish Olympic racing cyclist (1960).
- Theresa Two Bulls, 71, American Oglala politician.
- Glenn Wilkes, 91, American college basketball coach (Stetson Hatters).
- Ricky Yacobi, 57, Indonesian footballer (PSMS Medan, Arseto Solo, national team), heart attack.
- Chester Yorton, 81, American bodybuilder, heart attack.

=== 22 ===
- Sidi Ould Cheikh Abdallahi, 82, Mauritanian politician, president (2007–2008).
- Carlo Ausino, 82, Italian film director (Double Game, Tony: Another Double Game, Don't Look in the Attic) and cinematographer.
- Stephen Booth, 87, American academic.
- Paul Callan, 81, British journalist (Evening Standard, Daily Mail, Daily Mirror), fall.
- Anwar Aziz Chaudhry, 89, Pakistani Olympic swimmer (1948) and politician, MP (1988–1990).
- Paul Covington, 86, American basketball coach (Jackson State Tigers).
- Doris de Agostini, 62, Swiss Olympic alpine skier (1976, 1980).
- Carlo D'Este, 84, American lieutenant colonel and military historian.
- Billy Evans, 88, American basketball player (Kentucky Wildcats), Olympic champion (1956).
- Muharrem Fejzo, 87, Albanian film director, set designer and sculptor, COVID-19.
- Jimmy Fletcher, 89, English footballer (Dartford).
- Gonzalo Galván Castillo, 69, Mexican Roman Catholic prelate, bishop of Autlán (2004–2015).
- Honestie Hodges, 14, American police reformer, COVID-19.
- Elena Hrenova, 70, Moldovan politician, MP (2014–2019), COVID-19.
- Otto Hutter, 96, Austrian-born British physiologist.
- Helen LaFrance, 101, American artist.
- Hamish MacInnes, 90, Scottish mountaineer.
- Mustafa Nadarević, 77, Bosnian actor (When Father Was Away on Business, The Glembays, Silent Gunpowder) and comedian, lung cancer.
- George Nock, 74, American football player (New York Jets, Washington Redskins), COVID-19.
- Pan He, 95, Chinese sculptor.
- Yuriy Pleshakov, 32, Ukrainian-Russian footballer (Sevastopol, Desna Chernihiv).
- Jerrold Post, 86, American psychiatrist and author, COVID-19.
- Ray Prosser, 93, Welsh rugby union player (Pontypool, British and Irish Lions, Barbarians).
- Pat Quinn, 37, American disability activist, co-creator of the Ice Bucket Challenge, complications from amyotrophic lateral sclerosis.
- Jon Peter Rolie, 74, Norwegian author.
- Noëlla Rouget, 100, French resistance member and teacher.
- Badal Roy, 62, Bangladeshi footballer (Mohammedan, national team), liver cancer.
- Maurice Setters, 83, English football player (West Bromwich Albion, Manchester United) and manager (Doncaster Rovers), complications from Alzheimer's disease.
- Raimo Tuomela, 80, Finnish philosopher.
- Corrie van Gorp, 78, Dutch singer and actress (De Wereld Draait Door).

=== 23 ===
- Imoro Andani, Ghanaian royal, Northern Regional minister.
- Franco Archibugi, 94, Italian scholar.
- Dorothy Gill Barnes, 93, American artist, complications from COVID-19.
- Vinicio Bernardini, 94, Italian politician, COVID-19.
- Bruce Boynton, 83, American civil rights activist (Freedom Riders, Boynton v. Virginia), cancer.
- Tamás Böröndi, 65, Hungarian actor (Szomszédok, Samba), COVID-19.
- Vittorio Catani, 80, Italian science fiction writer.
- Karl Dall, 79, German actor (Freddy in the Wild West, Hotel Clausewitz, Student of the Bedroom) and comedian, stroke.
- Abby Dalton, 88, American actress (Falcon Crest, The Joey Bishop Show, Hennesey).
- Hartmut Derendorf, 67, German-American pharmacist, clinical pharmacologist and professor.
- David Dinkins, 93, American politician, mayor of New York City (1990–1993), borough president of Manhattan (1986–1989) and member of the New York State Assembly (1966).
- Otto Duintjer, 88, Dutch philosopher.
- Admir Džubur, 56, Bosnian public utility executive and football administrator, chairman of Željezničar (since 2019), COVID-19.
- Marco Virgilio Ferrari, 87, Italian Roman Catholic prelate, auxiliary bishop of Milan (1987–2009), COVID-19.
- Konrad Fiałkowski, 80, Polish computer scientist, engineer and science fiction writer.
- Jofran Frejat, 83, Brazilian politician, deputy (1987–2003, 2007–2011), lung cancer.
- Tarun Gogoi, 84, Indian politician, chief minister of Assam (2011–2016), MP (1971–1984, 1991–1996, 1998–2001) and Assam MLA (1996–1998, since 2001), complications from COVID-19.
- Robert Hammerstiel, 87, Austrian painter and engraver.
- Klaus Heinrich, 93, German philosopher of religion.
- Arthur Hervet, 82, French Roman Catholic priest.
- i_o, 30, American disc jockey and music producer, complications from Hashimoto's thyroiditis.
- Haluk Kakış, 88, Turkish Olympic sailor.
- Hal Ketchum, 67, American country singer-songwriter ("Small Town Saturday Night", "Past the Point of Rescue", "Hearts Are Gonna Roll"), complications from dementia.
- Yasumi Kobayashi, 58, Japanese science fiction writer, cancer.
- Edward Lazear, 72, American economist, pancreatic cancer.
- Peter Lichtner-Hoyer, 94, Austrian Olympic equestrian (1956), pentathlete (1960) and colonel.
- Édouard Marquis, 51, French television and radio host.
- Günther Meier, 79, German Olympic boxer.
- Christian Mistral, 56, Canadian novelist, poet and songwriter.
- Nikolai Myshagin, 65, Kazakh ice hockey coach (Metallurg Novokuznetsk, Barys Astana, national team).
- Anele Ngcongca, 33, South African footballer (FC Fortune, Genk, national team), traffic collision.
- John Oldham, 97, American basketball player (Fort Wayne Pistons) and coach (Tennessee Tech Golden Eagles, Western Kentucky Hilltoppers).
- Louise Pajo, 80, New Zealand actress (Doctor Who, The Avengers, Prisoner).
- Günter Rittner, 93, German painter and illustrator.
- David Rogers, 99, English archdeacon.
- Józef Rysula, 81, Polish Olympic cross-country skier (1960, 1964, 1968).
- Sergei Shmonin, 51, Russian football player (Krylia Sovetov) and executive (Yunit Samara).
- Nikola Spasov, 61, Bulgarian football player (Dunav Ruse, Cherno More) and manager (Kaliakra Kavarna), COVID-19.
- Viktor Zimin, 58, Russian politician, chairman of the Government of Khakassia (2009–2018), COVID-19.

=== 24 ===
- João Alves Filho, 79, Brazilian politician and civil engineer, governor of Sergipe (1983–1987, 1991–1995, 2003–2007) and mayor of Aracaju (1975–1979, 2013–2017), COVID-19.
- Ricardo Barreda, 83, Argentine mass murderer, complications from Alzheimer's.
- Rose Marie Battaglia, 91, American Hall of Fame college basketball coach (Bergen Community College, Iona College), lung cancer.
- Fasih Bokhari, 78, Pakistani military officer and civil servant, chief of Naval Staff (1997–1999) and chairman of the National Accountability Bureau (2011–2013).
- David Butler, 92, Australian major general.
- Montserrat Carulla, 90, Spanish actress (Companys, procés a Catalunya, El Cor de la Ciutat, The Orphanage).
- Juan de Dios Castro Lozano, 78, Mexican lawyer and politician, president of the Chamber of Deputies (2003–2004) and MP (1979–1985, 1991–2000, 2003–2006), COVID-19.
- Yves Vander Cruysen, 57, Belgian historian and politician, COVID-19.
- José de Bastos, 91, Portuguese football player (Benfica, Beira-Mar) and manager (Estoril Praia).
- Christophe Dominici, 48, French rugby union player (Toulon, Stade Français, national team), fall.
- Erik Galimov, 84, Russian geochemist.
- Julio César Gandarilla Bermejo, 77, Cuban vice admiral, minister of the interior (since 2017).
- Jim Hanifan, 87, American football coach (St. Louis Cardinals) and player (Toronto Argonauts).
- Yaroslav Horak, 93, Australian illustrator and comics artist.
- Damián Iguacén Borau, 104, Spanish Roman Catholic prelate, bishop of San Cristóbal de La Laguna (1984–1991).
- Mohammad Khadem, 85, Iranian Olympic wrestler (1960).
- Kambuzia Partovi, 65, Iranian film director (Café Transit, Closed Curtain) and screenwriter (The Circle), COVID-19.
- Dorothea G. Petrie, 95, American television producer.
- Alan Ramsey, 82, Australian journalist (The Sydney Morning Herald) and speechwriter, complications from dementia.
- Mike Reed, 75, Australian politician, MLA (1987–2003), deputy chief minister of the Northern Territory (1995–2001).
- Khalif Isse Mudan, 67, Somali politician and Air Force commander, COVID-19.
- Ashiesh Roy, 55, Indian actor (Home Delivery, Raja Natwarlal, Barkhaa), kidney failure.
- Harry Ryan, 63, Irish hurler (Kilkenny).
- Bob Ryder, 64, American professional wrestling journalist.
- Kalbe Sadiq, 81, Indian Islamic scholar, pneumonia and colorectal cancer.
- Fred Sasakamoose, 86, Canadian ice hockey player (Chicago Blackhawks), COVID-19.
- Romey Stuckart, 65, American painter.
- Mamadou Tandja, 82, Nigerien politician, president (1999–2010).
- Arthur Frank Wertheim, 84, American scholar.
- Vasil Yakusha, 62, Belarusian rower, Olympic silver (1980) and bronze medallist (1988).
- Hussein Al-Zuhairi, Iraqi politician, MP, COVID-19.

=== 25 ===
- Charles Bail, 85, American actor (The Stunt Man) and film director (The Gumball Rally, Cleopatra Jones and the Casino of Gold), COVID-19.
- Marc-André Bédard, 85, Canadian lawyer and politician, deputy premier of Quebec (1984–1985) and Quebec MNA (1973–1985), COVID-19.
- Saïd Bouhadja, 82, Algerian politician, president of the People's National Assembly (2017–2018).
- Marcello Brunelli, 81, Italian neurophysiologist and academic, complications from COVID-19.
- Bob DeWeese, 86, American politician, member of the Kentucky House of Representatives (1993–2016).
- Márton Erdős, 76, Hungarian Olympic wrestler.
- Cor Geelhuijzen, 91, Dutch footballer (Ajax).
- Denis Heaslip, 87, Irish hurler.
- Karl Janetschek, 80, Austrian chess player.
- Marion Law, 80, New Zealand netball and tennis player.
- Uriah Adolphus Ashley Maclean, 76, Panamanian Roman Catholic prelate, bishop of Penonomé (1993–2015).
- Diego Maradona, 60, Argentine footballer (Barcelona, Napoli, national team), World Cup winner (1986), heart attack.
- Duris Maxwell, 74, Canadian drummer, heart failure.
- José Manuel Mireles Valverde, 62, Mexican paramilitary leader, COVID-19.
- Ahmad Mukhtar, 74, Pakistani politician, minister of defence (2008–2012) and water and power (2012–2013).
- Colin Newell, 47, British television personality (Storage Hunters, Celebrity Big Brother).
- William L. Nicholson, 94, American Air Force major general.
- Paul Nyman, 91, Finnish Olympic racing cyclist (1952, 1956, 1960).
- Ahmed Patel, 71, Indian politician, MP (1977–1989, since 1993), complications from COVID-19.
- Markus Paul, 54, American football player (Chicago Bears) and coach (New York Giants, Dallas Cowboys), complications from a heart attack.
- Zenon Plech, 67, Polish motorcycle speedway rider.
- Alan Powell, 84, New Zealand-born Australian historian.
- S. James Press, 89, American statistician.
- Jacques Secrétin, 71, French table tennis player, world champion (1977).
- Flor Silvestre, 90, Mexican singer ("Cielo rojo"), actress (The Soldiers of Pancho Villa, Ánimas Trujano) and equestrienne.
- Jaroslav Šmíd, 65, Czech Olympic volleyball player.
- Robert E. Thacker, 102, American test pilot.
- Camilla Wicks, 92, American violinist.
- James Wolfensohn, 86, Australian-American banker and Olympic fencer (1956), president of the World Bank Group (1995–2005).

=== 26 ===
- Fecó Balázs, 69, Hungarian singer and composer, COVID-19.
- Allan Botschinsky, 80, Danish jazz trumpeter.
- George H. Carley, 82, American jurist, justice (1993–2012) and chief justice (2012) of the Supreme Court of Georgia, COVID-19.
- Fritz Cejka, 92, Austrian footballer (ESV Admira Vienna, Kapfenberger SV, national team).
- Athol Kennedy Chase, 84, Australian anthropologist and ethnographer.
- Garry Davidson, 66, Australian footballer (Geelong).
- Cecilia Fusco, 87, Italian operatic soprano, long illness complicated by COVID-19.
- Jamir Garcia, 42, Filipino singer (Slapshock), suicide by hanging.
- Alan I. Green, 77, American psychiatrist.
- Vladimir Ivanov, 65, Bulgarian Olympic sprinter (1980), complications from COVID-19.
- Benjamín Jiménez Hernández, 82, Mexican Roman Catholic prelate, bishop of Culiacán (1993–2011).
- F. C. Kohli, 96, Indian industrialist, founder of Tata Consultancy Services and president of NASSCOM (1995–1996), heart attack.
- Dimitar Largov, 84, Bulgarian footballer (Slavia Sofia, national team).
- Sadiq al-Mahdi, 84, Sudanese politician and religious leader, prime minister (1966–1967, 1986–1989), COVID-19.
- Alfonso Milián Sorribas, 81, Spanish Roman Catholic prelate, bishop of Barbastro-Monzón (2004–2014).
- Tevita Momoedonu, 74, Fijian politician, prime minister (2000, 2001).
- Daria Nicolodi, 70, Italian actress (Deep Red, Shock) and screenwriter (Suspiria).
- Louis Nzala Kianza, 74, Congolese Roman Catholic prelate, bishop of Popokabaka (1996–2020).
- Richard Polenberg, 83, American historian.
- Hafez Abu Seada, 55, Egyptian human rights activist, chairman of the Egyptian Organization for Human Rights (since 2004), COVID-19.
- Nur Supriyanto, 55, Indonesian politician, MP of West Java (2004–2018, since 2019), COVID-19.
- Kamen Tchanev, 56, Bulgarian operatic tenor, COVID-19.
- Daniel Michael Tellep, 89, American businessman.
- Celestino Vercelli, 74, Italian racing cyclist.
- Dadang Wigiarto, 53, Indonesian politician, regent of Situbondo (since 2010), COVID-19.

=== 27 ===
- Kevin Burnham, 63, American sailor, Olympic champion (2004) and silver medalist (1992), pulmonary disease.
- Selva Casal, 93, Uruguayan poet.
- Mohsen Fakhrizadeh, 59, Iranian nuclear scientist, shot.
- Gene Fraise, 88, American politician, member of the Iowa Senate (1986–2013), COVID-19.
- Tony Hsieh, 46, American internet entrepreneur (Zappos), injuries sustained in a house fire.
- Madieng Khary Dieng, 88, Senegalese politician, minister of the interior (1991–1993).
- Jin Zhanpeng, 82, Chinese metallurgist, member of the Chinese Academy of Sciences.
- Keisuke Kumakiri, 86, Japanese photographer, aspiration pneumonia.
- Dainis Liepiņš, 58, Latvian racing cyclist.
- Kamel Madoun, Algerian handball player and coach (NA Hussein Dey, Oman Club, national team).
- Jim McFarland, 73, American football player (St. Louis Cardinals, Miami Dolphins) and politician, member of the Nebraska Legislature (1986–1991), pancreatic cancer.
- Bob Miller, 94, American baseball player (Philadelphia Phillies).
- Lou Nistico, 67, Canadian ice hockey player (Toronto Toros, Colorado Rockies).
- Dieter Popp, 82, German spy.
- Parviz Poorhosseini, 79, Iranian actor (Bashu, the Little Stranger, Saint Mary), COVID-19.
- John B. Roe, 78, American politician, member of the Illinois Senate (1973–1979), myelofibrosis.
- Kenneth C. Smith Sr., 88, American politician, member of the New Hampshire House of Representatives (1974–1982).
- Carlos Alberto Vázquez, 86, Argentine Olympic cyclist.
- Donald Whiston, 90, English footballer (Stoke City, Crewe Alexandra, Rochdale).
- Aly Zaker, 76, Bangladeshi actor (Agami, Nodir Naam Modhumoti, Lalsalu), marketing director and writer, COVID-19.

=== 28 ===
- Lon Adams, 95, American food scientist, creator of the Slim Jim, complications from COVID-19.
- Shams Badran, 91, Egyptian politician, minister of defense (1966–1967).
- Hakam Balawi, 82, Palestinian politician, minister of the interior (2003–2005).
- Clifton Bertrand, 84, Trinidadian Olympic sprinter (1960, 1964).
- Bharat Bhalke, 60, Indian politician, complications from COVID-19.
- Philippe Clair, 90, French film director (Déclic et des claques, Par où t'es rentré ? On t'a pas vu sortir), actor (Girl on the Road) and screenwriter.
- Othella Dallas, 95, American dancer and jazz singer, lung cancer.
- Roger Fite, 82, French rugby union player (Cahors Rugby, CA Brive, national team).
- Andrea Huser, 46, Swiss mountain biker and triathlete, fall.
- Jin Dinghan, 90, Chinese translator.
- Ian Jenkins, 67, British archaeologist and curator.
- Shahadat Hossain Khan, 62, Bangladeshi sarod player, COVID-19.
- Jan Kilian, 66, Polish politician and entrepreneur, member of the Sejm (2015–2019).
- Roberto Leitão, 83, Brazilian martial artist, COVID-19.
- Sara Leland, 79, American ballet dancer and répétiteur, New York City Ballet principal dancer (1972–1983), congestive heart failure.
- Tyler C. Lockett, 87, American jurist, justice of the Kansas Supreme Court (1983–2003), COVID-19.
- Roger Mandle, 79, American art curator and academic administrator, president of the Rhode Island School of Design (1993–2008).
- David Mordaunt, 83, English cricketer (Sussex).
- Basil Moss, 85, British actor (Emergency Ward 10, First Among Equals, David Copperfield).
- Vítor Oliveira, 67, Portuguese football player (Portimonense) and manager (Paços de Ferreira, Gil Vicente), heart attack.
- Bonifácio Piccinini, 91, Brazilian Roman Catholic prelate, archbishop of Cuiabá (1981–2004).
- Maria Piechotka, 100, Polish architect and politician, member of the Sejm (1961–1965).
- David Prowse, 85, English actor (Star Wars, A Clockwork Orange, Jabberwocky) and bodybuilder, complications from COVID-19.
- Peter Radtke, 77, German actor and playwright.
- Juan de Dios Román, 77, Spanish handball coach (Atlético Madrid BM, BM Ciudad Real, national team) and president of the RFEBM (2008–2013), stroke.
- Anneliese Seonbuchner, 91, German Olympic hurdler (1952).
- Jean-Louis Servan-Schreiber, 83, French journalist, COVID-19.
- Pearl Sullivan, 59, Malaysian-Canadian engineer, cancer.
- Jean Tavernier, 92, French politician.
- Wendy Weir, 72, Australian cricketer, cancer.
- Marvin Westmore, 85, American makeup artist (Blade Runner, The Best Little Whorehouse in Texas, Escape from L.A.).

=== 29 ===
- Miša Aleksić, 67, Serbian rock bassist (Riblja Čorba), complications from COVID-19.
- Sahibzada Farooq Ali, 89, Pakistani politician, speaker of the National Assembly (1973–1977).
- José Rafael Barquero Arce, 89, Costa Rican Roman Catholic prelate, auxiliary bishop of Alajuela (1980–2007).
- E. Pope Bassett, 85, American politician.
- Ben Bova, 88, American science fiction writer (Grand Tour), complications from COVID-19 and a stroke.
- Edda Bresciani, 90, Italian Egyptologist.
- Marco Dino Brogi, 88, Italian Roman Catholic prelate, apostolic nuncio to Egypt and delegate to the Arab League (2002–2006), COVID-19.
- Tom Casperson, 61, American politician, member of the Michigan House of Representatives (2003–2008) and Senate (2011–2018), lung cancer.
- Mary R. Dawson, 89, American vertebrate paleontologist and museum curator (Carnegie Museum of Natural History), heart failure.
- Papa Bouba Diop, 42, Senegalese footballer (Fulham, Portsmouth, national team), complications from amyotrophic lateral sclerosis.
- Philip Dulhunty, 96, Australian aviator, aspiration pneumonia.
- Jack Foley, 81, American basketball player (Holy Cross Crusaders, Boston Celtics, New York Knicks).
- Vladimir Fortov, 74, Russian physicist, member of the Russian Academy of Sciences, COVID-19.
- Ernesto Galli, 75, Italian football player and coach (Lanerossi Vicenza), COVID-19.
- Nelly Sfeir Gonzalez, 90, American librarian and bibliographer, complications from COVID-19.
- Sam Herman, 84, British glass artist.
- Siegfried Hug, 84, German Olympic cross-country skier (1960).
- Senga McCrone, 86, Scottish bowler.
- Joe Mooney, 90, American stadium groundskeeper (Boston Red Sox).
- Giorgio Morales, 88, Italian politician, mayor of Florence (1989–1995), pneumonia.
- Peg Murray, 96, American actress (Cabaret), Tony winner (1967).
- April Boy Regino, 59, Filipino musician and actor, chronic kidney disease.
- John Sedgley, 81, English cricketer (Worcestershire).
- Remo Sernagiotto, 65, Italian politician, MEP (2014–2019), heart attack.
- Ali-Asghar Shahbazi, 98, Iranian actor (A Separation), cardiac arrest.
- Suh Se-ok, 91, South Korean painter.
- Nedal Abu Tabaq, 49, Polish-Palestinian imam and doctor, COVID-19.
- Viorel Turcu, 60, Romanian footballer (Argeș Pitești, Steaua București, national team), heart attack.
- Ayhan Ulubelen, 89, Turkish analytical chemist, COVID-19.
- Richard C. West, 76, American librarian and Tolkien scholar, COVID-19.

=== 30 ===
- Miguel Algarín, 79, Puerto Rican writer, co-founder of the Nuyorican Poets Café.
- Sheetal Amte, 39, Indian social worker, suicide.
- Irina Antonova, 98, Russian art historian, complications from COVID-19.
- Herman van Bekkum, 88, Dutch chemist.
- Dee Benson, 72, American jurist, judge (since 1991) and chief judge (1999–2006) of the U.S. District Court for Utah, brain cancer.
- Eddie Benton-Banai, 89, American civil rights activist (American Indian Movement).
- Betty Bobbitt, 81, American-born Australian actress (Prisoner, Crocodile Dundee II, Crocodile Dundee in Los Angeles), stroke.
- Hella Brock, 101, German music educator and musicologist, COVID-19.
- Lisa K. Cummins, 57, American model and dentist, cardiac arrest.
- Vishwa Nath Datta, 94, Indian historian.
- Ross Dykes, 75, New Zealand cricketer (Auckland).
- Lorenzo Fernández, 81, Cuban baseball player (Baltimore Orioles).
- Guido Goldman, 83, American political scientist.
- Bruce Herschensohn, 88, American political commentator.
- Tatsuo Ikeda, 92, Japanese artist, aspiration pneumonia.
- Liliane Juchli, 87, Swiss nurse and author, COVID-19.
- Kiran Maheshwari, 59, Indian politician, MP (2004–2009), COVID-19.
- David Mills, 94, Canadian bass singer and poet.
- José María Palomo, 74, Spanish Olympic bobsledder.
- Branimir Šćepanović, 83, Serbian writer.
- Aleksandr Shatskikh, 46, Kazakh football player (Kainar, national team) and manager.
- Muhammad Adil Siddiqui, 57, Pakistani politician, Sindh MPA (2013–2018), COVID-19.
- Anne Sylvestre, 86, French singer-songwriter.
- Tan Eng Bock, 84, Singaporean Olympic water polo player (1956), stroke.
- Dan W. Urry, 85, American biophysicist and chemist, heart attack.
