= Jan Vrba =

Jan Vrba is the name of:

- Jan Vrba (bobsledder) (born 1982), Czech bobsledder
- Jan Vrba (politician) (1937–2020), Czech politician
