= Sedgley (surname) =

Sedgley is a surname. Notable people with the surname include:

- John Sedgley (1939–2020), English cricketer
- Max Sedgley (fl. 2004), British record producer, drummer, and DJ
- Steve Sedgley (born 1968), English footballer and manager
