= Gwijangge =

Gwijangge is a Nduga surname. Notable people with the surname include:

- Iqbal Gwijangge (born 2006), Indonesian footballer
- Yairus Gwijangge (1968–2020), Indonesian politician
