= Robert Farmer =

Robert or Bob Farmer may refer to:

- Bob Farmer (1947–2026), Australian rules footballer
- Robert Farmer (ice hockey) (born 1991), British ice hockey forward
- Robert Farmer (Paralympian), Australian Paralympic lawn bowler
- Bob Farmer, columnist for the magazine Genii
- Robert Farmer (officer), commandant at Fort de Chartres, see List of commandants of the Illinois Country
- Robert Farmer (American football) (born 1974), NFL player
- Robert L. Farmer (1933–2020), member of the North Carolina House of Representatives
