= Valentin Khromov =

Russian poet (1933–2020)

- Born: Valentin Konstantinovich Khromov; 2 December 1933; Moscow, Russian SFSR
- Died: 11 November 2020 (aged 86)
- Occupation: Poet

Valentin Konstantinovich Khromov (Russian: Валентин Константинович Хромов 2 December 1933 – 11 November 2020) was a Russian poet.

== Biography ==
Born in Moscow on 2 December 1933, Khromov studied alongside the artist Anatoly Zverev. He graduated from the Institute of Foreign Languages. He was one of the first poets of his generation to utilize the palindrome.

In the mid-1950s, Khromov joined the Poets of the Mansard, one of the first circles of poets attempting to overcome censorship by the Soviet Union. He wrote several critical works on poetry, as well as essays on artists and poets.

Valentin Khromov died on 11 November 2020, at the age of 86.
