= Keith Talboys =

English cricketer (1931–2020)

Keith Talboys (19 December 1931 – 7 November 2020) was an English cricketer. He was a right-handed batsman who played for Oxfordshire. He was born in Oxford.

Talboys, who made his debut for the team in the Minor Counties Championship in 1948, at the age of just 16, continued to play for the team in the competition until 1968.

His only List A appearance came in the 1967 Gillette Cup, against Cambridgeshire. He scored a single run.

Talboys died on 7 November 2020, at the age of 88.
