= Ronald Bullough =

British materials scientist (1931–2020)

Ronald Bullough FRS

Ronald Bullough FRS (6 April 1931 – 20 November 2020) was a British materials scientist. He made leading contributions in the field of irradiated solids. He was a former Chief Scientist and Director of Corporate Research at the UK Atomic Energy Authority.
