= Jerzy Derkacz =

Polish politician (1950–2020)

Jerzy Derkacz (1950 – 10 November 2020) was a Polish politician who served as a Senator.
