= António Valverde Martins =

Portuguese politician (1935–2020)

António Valverde Martins (1935 – 14 November 2020) was a Portuguese politician who served as a Deputy.
