= Maria Piechotka =

Polish architect (1920–2020)

Maria Piechotka (12 July 1920 – 28 November 2020) was a Polish architect and politician who served as a member of the Sejm.
