= Nedal Abu Tabaq =

Polish-Palestinian doctor and imam

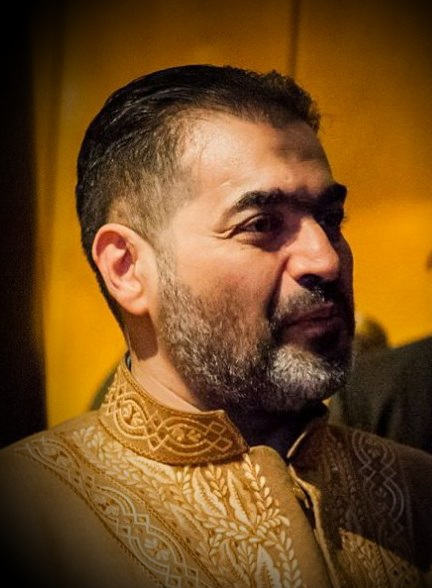
Nedal Abu Tabaq

Nedal Abu Tabaq (14 January 1971 – 29 November 2020) was a Polish-Palestinian doctor and imam, mufti of the Muslim League in Poland and permanent court mediator at the District Court in Lublin.

== Biography ==
Nedal was born in Khafji, Saudi Arabia, into a family of Palestinian refugees, who later moved to Kuwait, where he attended secondary school. In 1988, he went to Poland as part of a scholarship to study at the Medical University of Lublin. He became doctor in 1997. During his studies, he was involved in activities for the integration of the Muslim student community in Lublin, and was the founder of the Muslim Students Association. In 2004, after graduating from theological and legal studies in France obtained the title of specialist in sharia law. He became the imam of the Islamic Cultural Center in Lublin, the mufti and chairman of the Imams Council of the Muslim League of the Republic of Poland, and deputy chairman of the Supreme Council of the Muslim League in Poland. From 2016 he was the chairman of the Muslim Association for Cultural Education. He actively participated in intercultural and inter-religious dialogue, and was responsible for the factual correction of the translation of Sahih al-Bukhari.

He died from COVID-19 in Lublin, Poland, on 29 November 2020, at age 49, during the COVID-19 pandemic in Poland.
