= Joe Núñez =

American politician

José Cleto Nuñez (April 5, 1937 – November 16, 2020) was an American politician from Colorado.

== Career ==
Prior to his election, he served in the United States Air Force for 20 years, rising to the rank of Lieutenant Colonel.

Núñez was elected twice to the Colorado State Legislature, and served as a Republican member of the Colorado House of Representatives for House District 64 from 1998 until 2001, when he resigned.

In 2001, he was appointed by George W. Bush as the Denver Regional Director for the United States Department of Health and Human Services and he served in that role until 2006.

== Personal life ==
He was married to Lily Núñez, who served as the National Committeewoman for the Colorado Republican Party and as the Regional Director for the Small Business Administration from 1991 to 1993 under George H. W. Bush.

Núñez died from COVID-19 on November 16, 2020, just six days after his wife Lily died of the same illness. He was 83 years old.
