= Jacques Jurquet =

French political activist (1922–2020)

- Born: 2 April 1922; Marseille, France
- Died: 21 November 2020 (aged 98); Marseille, France
- Occupation: Political Activist

Jacques Jurquet (2 April 1922 – 21 November 2020) was a French political activist.

== Biography ==
Jurquet was born into a family of leftists. His father, Albert, was a member of the French Section of the Workers' International and welcomed Germans fleeing Nazism between World War I and World War II. Jacques joined the socialist youth in 1936. That same year, he tried to join the International Brigades, which refused him because of his age. During his undergraduate studies, he met Machla Feigenbaum, a young Polish refugee, who he married in 1941.

Employed in the Marseille city government, he joined the French Communist Party (PCF), although his activity was limited due to his two young children. In 1942, he was forced into the Service du travail obligatoire. He escaped the train that was to take him to Germany and joined the French Resistance. In 1944, he joined the French Forces of the Interior and the Francs-Tireurs et Partisans in the Jura Mountains. In November of that year, they mobilized into the Vosges.

After the war, Jurquet became a tax official and performed functions for the PCF in Doubs, Seine-et-Marne, and Marseille. During the Algerian War, under the influence of Baya Jurquet, who he married in 1978, he did not approve of the stance taken by the PCF. He was removed from the federal committee of Bouches-du-Rhône in 1959 and excluded from the party altogether in 1964, due to his favorable view of China and Albania. That year, he made his first trip to China. When L'Humanité nouvelle was launched in 1965, he became editorial secretary. He then advocated for his social Marxist–Leninist circles to form one party, which was done in December 1967 under the name Marxist–Leninist Communist Party of France (PCMLF). The party was disbanded in June 1968 for its involvement in the May 68 protests.

Although his party was disbanded, Jurquet continued to mobilize French Maoists through his continued publication of L'Humanité nouvelle. In 1969, he launched L'Humanité rouge. He continued his links with the Chinese Communist Party and the Party of Labour of Albania. He was a member of the Unified Socialist Party, and in his papers written with the party denied the Cambodian genocide, as he had done with the Gulag and the Laogai.

After the death of Mao Zedong and the break between Chinese and Albanian communists, the underground PCMLF experienced losses in personnel and momentum. In 1985, although Jurquet was opposed to it, the PCMLF was absorbed by the Party for a Communist Alternative.

Jacques Jurquet died in Marseille on 21 November 2020 at the age of 98.

== Publications ==
- Le Printemps révolutionnaire de 1968. Essai d'analyse marxiste-léniniste (1968)
- Positions du mouvement ouvrier français et international sur les questions coloniales et l'Algérie avant la naissance du Parti Communiste Français (1973)
- Arracher la classe ouvrière au révisionnisme (1976)
- 1939–1945 : le génocide colonialiste du Constantinois (1979)
- La Révolution nationale algérienne et le Parti Communiste français
- Mouvements communiste et nationaliste en Algérie (1982)
- Des élections à la lutte armée (1984)
- Années de feu. Algérie 1954–1956 (1997)
- A contre-courant 1963–1986 (2001)
- Femmes algériennes. De la Kahina au code de la famille (2007)
- Les Hurlements de la vie (2008)
- Sur les chemins de la vie (2009)
- Vieillesse cruelle (2010)
