= Edmund Jagiełło =

Polish politician (1946–2020)

Edmund Jagiełło (14 November 1946 – 11 November 2020) was a Polish politician who served as a member of the Sejm, and later as a Senator as a member of the Polish United Workers' Party.
