= Merle W. Schotanus =

American politician

Member of the New Hampshire House of Representatives from the Sullivan 1st district
- In office 1984–1992

Member of the New Hampshire House of Representatives from the Sullivan 3rd district
- In office 1992–1998

Personal details
- Born: February 28, 1931 Libertyville, Illinois, U.S.
- Died: November 4, 2020 (aged 89)
- Party: Republican

Merle W. Schotanus (February 28, 1931 – November 4, 2020) was an American politician. He served as a Republican member for the Sullivan 1st and 3rd district of the New Hampshire House of Representatives.
