= Sergei Shmonin =

Russian footballer (1968–2020)

Personal information
- Full name: Sergei Anatolyevich Shmonin
- Date of birth: 24 November 1968
- Date of death: 23 November 2020 (aged 51)
- Place of death: Samara, Russia
- Height: 1.77 m (5 ft 9 1/2 in)
- Position: Midfielder

Senior career*
Years	Team	Apps	(Gls)
1996	FC Krylia Sovetov Samara	5	(0)
2004	FC Lokomotiv Samara		
2005	FC Yunit Samara (amateur)		

Managerial career
- 2006–2008: FC Yunit Samara (president)
- * Club domestic league appearances and goals

Sergei Anatolyevich Shmonin (Russian: Сергей Анатольевич Шмонин; 24 November 1968 – 23 November 2020) was a Russian football player.
