= Pearl Sullivan =

Malaysian-Canadian engineer (1961–2020)

- Born: 1961; Kuala Lumpur, Malaysia
- Died: November 28, 2020
- Education: Technical University of Nova Scotia University of British Columbia
- Scientific career
- Institutions: Nanyang Technological University University of New Brunswick University of Waterloo

Pearl Sullivan (1961 – November 28, 2020) was a Malaysian Canadian engineer and the former Dean of Engineering at the University of Waterloo, the first woman to hold the position.

== Early life and education ==
Sullivan was born in 1961 Kuala Lumpur, Malaysia and immigrated to Canada in the 1980s. She graduated from the Technical University of Nova Scotia, now part of Dalhousie University, in 1985 with a master's degree in Metallurgical Engineering. Following her time in Halifax, Sullivan completed a PhD in materials engineering at the University of British Columbia in 1990. Her doctoral studies were supervised by Anoush Poursartip.

== Academic career ==
Shortly after completing her studies she accepted a position at Nanyang Technological University, Singapore in 1991. Sullivan returned to Canada in 1994 after taking a position in the Department of Mechanical Engineering at the University of New Brunswick, where she was twice awarded the university's Faculty Merit Award for Excellence. Sullivan joined the University of Waterloo in 2004 as a professor of mechanical engineering. She served as Chair of the Department of Mechanical and Mechatronics Engineering from 2006 until January 2012. In 2012 Sullivan was named the Dean of Engineering, becoming the first woman to hold the position at Waterloo. She held the role until December 2019.

== Legacy ==
Professor Sullivan was a Fellow of the Canadian Academy of Engineering.

In November 2025, after a $20 million donation by the Gloria Baylis Foundation, the University of Waterloo Faculty of Engineering renamed its flagship Engineering building from Engineering 7 (E7) to Pearl Sullivan Engineering (PSE) in her honor, with Waterloo Engineering dean Mary Wells stating "Pearl was a force of nature ... Engineering 7 is thanks to Pearl."

== Death ==
Sullivan died on November 28, 2020, of cancer. At the time of her death she had been dealing with the illness for 12 years.
