= Harry Palmer (photographer) =

Canadian photographer (1930–2020)

- Born: Harry Palmer; October 30, 1930; Calgary, Alberta, Canada
- Died: November 2, 2020 (aged 90); Calgary, Alberta, Canada
- Occupation: Photographer

Harry Edmore Palmer (October 30, 1930 – November 2, 2020) was a Canadian photographer.

== Background ==
Harry Palmer graduated from the University of British Columbia in 1951 and was working as a mechanical engineer when he discovered documentary photography. In 1984 Palmer left the oil and gas industry for photography. He attended workshops, worked with photographers such as Dr. Harry Thomson and Paul Caponigro, and studied paintings to learn composition, colour, and lighting.

Palmer died on November 2, 2020, at the age of 90.

== Works ==
Palmer's photographs have been featured on stamps by Canada Post in 2003 and on Alberta's 2005 Centennial Stamp. Palmer's photographs have also been exhibited in the Canadian Museum of Contemporary Photography in 1992, and are in the collection of the Library and Archives Canada. In 2005, Palmer was nominated for the inaugural Lieutenant Governor of Alberta Arts Awards.

== Bibliography ==
Harry Palmer had three books of his work published:

- Calgary Places & People - 1983
- 125 Portraits - 1992
- The Tallpecs of Alberta & Saskatchewan - 2004
