= João Cunha (politician) =

Brazilian politician (1939–2020)

João Cunha (1939 – 14 November 2020) was a Brazilian politician who served as a Deputy.
