= Jean-Yves Nau =

French physician and scientific journalist (1952–2020)

- Born: 28 May 1952; Indre-et-Loire, France
- Died: 8 November 2020 (aged 68)
- Occupations: Physician; Scientific journalist

Jean-Yves Nau (28 May 1952 – 8 November 2020) was a French physician and scientific journalist.

== Biography ==
Nau began his career as a schoolteacher before studying medicine and journalism. He began working for the newspaper Le Monde in 1980. He worked there for nearly 30 years, occasionally writing in La Revue du Praticien, Revue Médicale Suisse, La Nouvelle République du Centre-Ouest. He moved to the French language version of Slate magazine as a columnist. He chaired the "journalism and public health" program at EHESP. He also ran a blog on journalism and public health.

Jean-Yves Nau died on 8 November 2020, at the age of 68.

== Publications ==
=== Books ===
- Journal de la vache folle (2001)
- Bioéthique, avis de tempêtes : Les nouveaux enjeux de la maîtrise du vivant (2003)
- Les Maladies d'aujourd'hui. De la maladie d'Alzheimer au sida (2003)
- Tout ce que vous ne savez pas sur la chicha (2007)
- Jean Bardet : faim de mots (2008)
- H1 N1, journal d'une pandémie (2009)

=== Articles ===
- "La véritable expérience du Dr James Lind" (2012)
