= Muhammad Adil Siddiqui =

Pakistani politician (1963–2020)

Member of the Provincial Assembly of Sindh
- In office 29 May 2013 – 28 May 2018

Personal details
- Born: 12 May 1963 Karachi, Sindh, Pakistan
- Died: 30 November 2020 (aged 57) Karachi, Sindh, Pakistan
- Party: MQM (2013-2020)

Muhammad Adil Siddiqui (12 May 1963 – 30 November 2020) was a Pakistani politician who had been a Member of the Provincial Assembly of Sindh, from May 2013 to May 2018.

== Early life and education ==
He was born on 12 May 1963, in Karachi.

He has a Bachelor of Arts degree from Karachi University.

== Political career ==
He was elected to the Provincial Assembly of Sindh as a candidate of Mutahida Quami Movement from Constituency PS-100 KARACHI-XII in the 2013 Pakistani general election.

== Death ==
He died from COVID-19 at Karachi Private Hospital on 30 November 2020, during the COVID-19 pandemic in Pakistan.
