= Heinz Schaub =

Swiss diver (1928–2020)

Personal information
- Full name: Heinz Peter Schaub
- Nationality: Swiss
- Born: 22 October 1928 Basel, Switzerland
- Died: 11 November 2020 (aged 92) Basel, Switzerland

Sport
- Sport: Diving

Heinz Schaub (22 October 1928 – 11 November 2020) was a Swiss diver. He competed in two events at the 1952 Summer Olympics.
