= Lisa K. Cummins =

American dentist and fashion model (1963–2020)

Lisa Kristine Cummins (December 13, 1963 – November 30, 2020) was an American dentist and fashion model, whose image appeared on the cover of Cosmopolitan three times.

== Early life and education ==
Cummins was born on December 13, 1963, in Killeen, Texas, to Hanny Bijlaard “Louise” and Peter R. Cummins. Her father was accepted by the Wharton School of the University of Pennsylvania, due to which Cummins, along with her family, moved to Springfield. There she attended a public school. After completing high school, she enrolled in Gettysburg College and then acquired a degree in dental medicine from the University of Pennsylvania. She completed tooth replacement and restoration training at Temple University to become a prosthodontist.

== Career ==
Cummins was 15 years old when Francesco Scavullo, a fashion and celebrity photographer, spotted her in New York while shopping with her parents. She was represented by the Ford Agency during the start of her career as a fashion model. She was featured on the cover of Cosmopolitan thrice and in Francesco Scavullo's book Scavullo Women, in 1982. In addition to working with Scavullo and his partner, Sean Byrnes, Cummins also wore the designs of Haitian-born American fashion designer Fabrice Simon for shoots in the early 1980s, along with several other Cosmopolitan covers with models like Brooke Shields, Paulina Porizkova, and Gia Carangi.

As a prosthodontist, she worked on dental cases for contestants for Miss World, Miss America and Miss Universe pageants. She carried out her solo dental practice in Bala Cynwyd, Pennsylvania.

== Death ==
Cummins died in Camden, New Jersey, on November 30, 2020, in Cooper University Hospital due to cardiac arrest complications.
