= Leonard Kamsler =

American photographer (1935–2020)

- Born: October 18, 1935; Raleigh, North Carolina, U.S.
- Died: November 18, 2020 (aged 85); Bethel, New York, U.S.
- Education: Duke University
- Occupation: Photojournalist
- Spouse: Stephen Lyles

Leonard Kamsler (October 18, 1935 – November 18, 2020) was an American golf photojournalist. He received the Lifetime Achievement Award in Photojournalism from the Professional Golfers' Association of America in 2020.
