= Tony Gershlick =

British cardiologist (1951–2020)

Anthony Gershlick (1951 – 20 November 2020) was a British cardiologist.

He was a professor of interventional cardiology at the University of Leicester until his death from COVID-19 in 2020, at age 69.

== Early life and education ==
Gershlick was born in 1951, in Southend-on-Sea, England. He suffered from dyslexia and described himself as a poor student in his early years, before finding success in medical school at St Mary's Hospital, London. He earned his Bachelors of Science in 1973 in biochemistry, followed by a MBBS in 1976, and the qualifications of MRCP in 1980.

== Career ==
Gershlick worked as an interventional cardiologist at Glenfield Hospital for more than 30 years. He was the UK lead for more than 10 international clinical trials and was an active researcher of cardiovascular procedures.

Gershlick was the first doctor in the UK to insert a drug-eluting stent into a patient, which is now considered the standard of practice. During his career, he served on the councils of the British Cardiovascular Intervention Society, British Cardiovascular Society, and European Society of Cardiology.

In January 2017, he was awarded the British Cardiovascular Intervention Society Lifetime Achievement Career Award. He was elected as a fellow of the Royal College of Physicians in 1994.

== Personal life ==
Amid the COVID-19 pandemic in the United Kingdom, Gershlick died from COVID-19 in the intensive care unit of the hospital he had worked at for most of his career. He was 69 years old.
