= Jean-Marie Mérigoux =

French Roman Catholic priest (1938–2020)

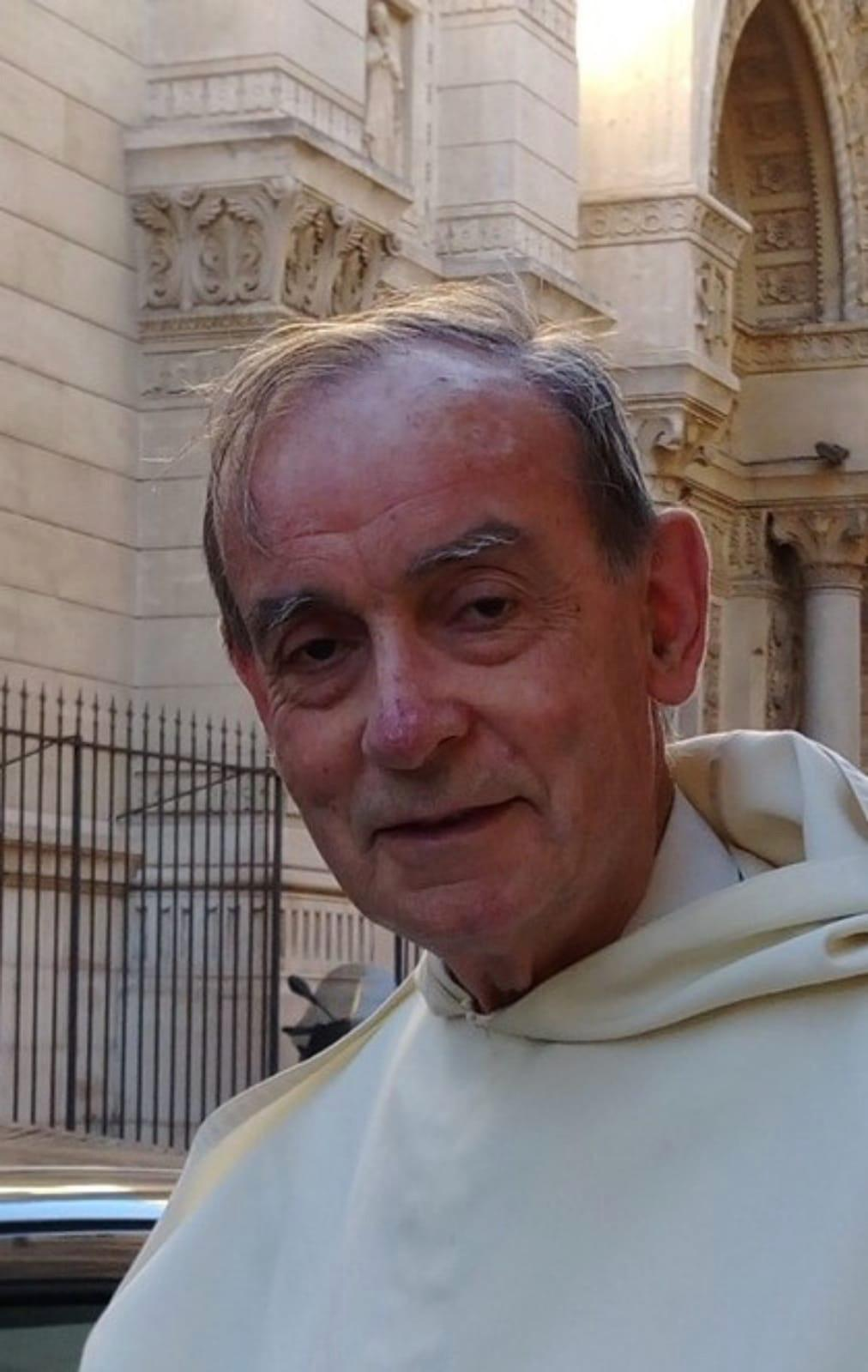
- Born: 27 January 1938; Besançon, France
- Died: 7 November 2020 (aged 82); Marseille, France
- Occupation: Roman Catholic priest

Jean-Marie Mérigoux (27 January 1938 – 7 November 2020) was a French Roman Catholic priest and university professor.

== Biography ==
Born in 1938 in Besançon, where his father was a professor of the sciences. After studying in Marseille, he attended the Catholic University of Toulouse. He was ordained a priest on 4 July 1965 in Rangueil and celebrated his first mass one week later in Foucherans.

Jean-Marie Mérgioux learned Arabic in Algiers and at Saint Joseph University in Beirut. He was then assigned to Iraq, where he stayed from 1969 to 1983. There, he trained young priests of the East Syriac Rite at the Saint-Jean-de-Mossoul seminary. He then joined the Dominican Institute for Oriental Studies in Cairo, where he stayed for 22 years.

Jean-Marie Mérigoux died in Marseille on 7 November 2020 at the age of 82.

== Publications ==
- Père Jean Maurice Fiey, op (1914-1995) (1997)
- Va à Ninive ! : un dialogue avec l’Irak (2000)
- Vers d’autres « Ninive » : Le Caire, Istanbul, Marseille : lettres, 1985-2010 (2010)
- Entretiens sur l’Orient chrétien : « Les deux poumons de l'Église » (2015)

== Collaborative works ==
- Les Dominicains et les mondes musulmans : le P. Libercier (1841-1928), dominicain enseignant et curé de Moscou (2002)
- Jonas ou La volonté de Dieu (2008)
- Le Kurdistan et ses chrétiens (2010)
