= Ernesto Galli =

Italian footballer and coach (1945–2020)

Personal information
- Date of birth: 25 July 1945
- Place of birth: Venice, Italy
- Date of death: 29 November 2020 (aged 75)
- Place of death: Vicenza, Italy
- Position: Goalkeeper

Senior career*
| Years | Team | Apps | (Gls) |
| 1964–1966 | Udinese | | |
| 1966–1967 | S.P.A.L. | | |
| 1967–1974 | Brescia | | |
| 1974–1975 | Cesena | | |
| 1975–1979 | Vicenza | | |
| 1979–1980 | Udinese | | |
| 1980–1981 | Vicenza | | |

Managerial career
- 1987–1989: Vicenza
- * Club domestic league appearances and goals

Ernesto Galli (25 July 1945 – 29 November 2020) was an Italian professional football player and coach.

== Career ==
Born in Venice, Galli played as a goalkeeper for Udinese, S.P.A.L., Brescia, Cesena and Vicenza.

After retiring as a player, he worked as a coach and managed Vicenza between 1987 and 1989.

=== Death ===
He died from COVID-19 on 29 November 2020, aged 75.
