= Charles-Henri Flammarion =

French editor (1946–2020)

- Born: 27 July 1946; Boulogne-Billancourt, France
- Died: 9 November 2020 (aged 74)
- Occupation: Editor

Charles-Henri Flammarion (27 July 1946 – 9 November 2020) was a French editor.

== Biography ==
Charles-Henri was the great-grandson of Ernest Flammarion, who founded the Groupe Flammarion in 1876. He held positions of executive assistant and general manager from 1985 to 2003. He sold the company to RCS MediaGroup in 2000. He also chaired the Cercle de la Librairie from 1994 to 2003.

Flammarion studied at the Faculté de droit et des sciences économiques de Paris, Columbia University, Sciences Po, and the Lycée Jean Pierre Vernant. He served as president and Director General of J'ai lu from 1982 to 2003, Fluide Glacial from 1990 to 2003 and of Casterman from 1999 to 2003. He was a member of the bureau of the Syndicat national de l'édition from 1979 to 1988 and again from 1996 to 2003. He was vice-president of the Cercle de la Librairie from 1994 to 2003.

Charles-Henri Flammarion died on 9 November 2020, at the age of 74.
