= Edgar García (bullfighter) =

Colombian bullfighter (1960–2020)

Edgar García (1 January 1960 – 21 November 2020) more commonly known as El Dandy, was a Colombian bullfighter.

Born in Zarzal, Colombia, he took the alternative on 22 January 1995 in the bullring of Manizales, Colombia being godfather José Antonio Campuzano and witness Tomás Campuzano. He confirmed the alternative on 29 December 2002 in Plaza de Toros México from the hands of Mexican bullfighter Mariano Ramos as godfather and Jorge Mora as his witness.

He also dedicated himself to calling festivals so that marginalized young people could participate alongside him so that they could show their bullfighting arts.

During COVID-19 pandemic in Colombia, he was in his wild cattle ranching in the Colombian city of Cartago when he began to have symptoms of COVID-19, being admitted to the Pereira hospital where he was intubated after testing positive. He died from the disease on 21 November 2020, at the age of 60.
