= Jacques Rifflet =

Belgian political scientist (1929–2020)

- Born: 7 February 1929; Schaerbeek, Belgium
- Died: 15 November 2020 (aged 91); Evere, Belgium
- Occupations: Lawyer; Journalist; Jurist

Jacques Rifflet (7 February 1929 – 15 November 2020) was a Belgian political scientist. He was a professor of law at several Belgian universities and wrote several books on religion.

== Biography ==
Rifflet earned a doctoral degree in law and political science from the Université libre de Bruxelles. He first worked as a lawyer at the Brussels Court of Appeal. He then worked as a journalist and a columnist for RTBF, covering news and international reports.

After his initial careers, he became a professor of law at the Université libre de Bruxelles. He was also a lecturer at the ICHEC Brussels Management School and a professor of law and international politics at the Institut supérieure de traducteurs et interprètes (ISTI) in Brussels, the University of Mons-Hainaut, and La Cambre.

He was known for the depth and comprehensiveness of his courses and writings, and his ability to understand and explain world relations based on historical and cultural factors.

In 2007, at the request of the European Union, he chaired a group of experts responsible for drafting a report on the principles of good media governance in Africa.

Jacques Rifflet died on 15 November 2020 at the age of 91.

== Publications ==
- Les mondes du sacré, éditions Mols : Religions, Laïcité, Esotérisme, des origines à nos jours et leur influence sur la Politique internationale (2009)
- L'islam dans tous ses états (2012)
