= E. Pope Bassett =

American politician

Ellsworth Pope Bassett
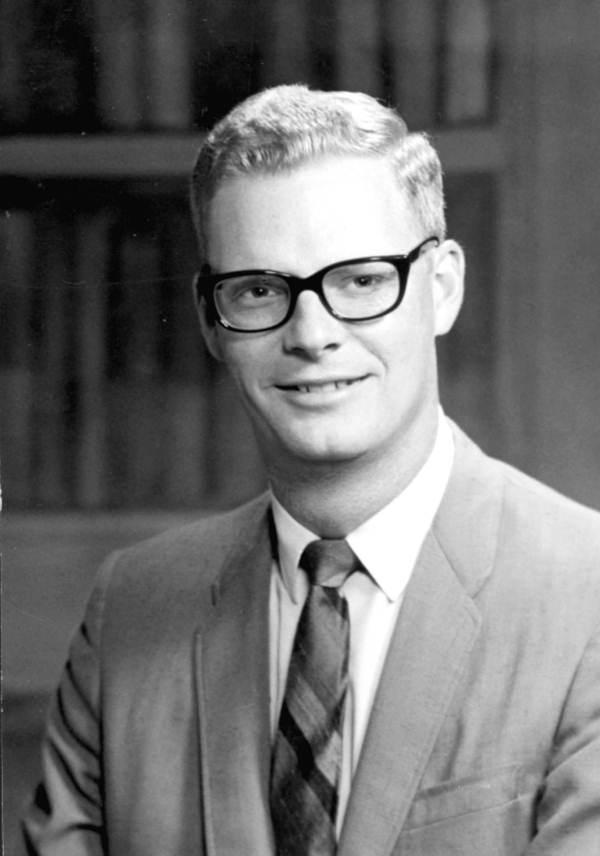
- Bassett in 1967

Member of the Florida House of Representatives from the 44th district
- In office 1967–1970

Personal details
- Born: 7 February 1935 Jacksonville, Florida
- Died: 29 November 2020 (aged 85) Leesburg, Florida
- Party: Republican
- Occupation: Attorney

Ellsworth Pope (Sandy) Bassett (February 7, 1935 – November 29, 2020) was an American politician and attorney in the state of Florida.

== Biography ==
Bassett was born in Jacksonville, Florida, on February 7, 1935. He attended Richmond College and the University of Richmond Law School. He served in the Florida House of Representatives from 1967 to 1970, representing district 44. He was a member of the Republican Party.

Bassett died on November 29, 2020, in Leesburg, Florida, at the age of 85.
