= Bernard Sesé =

French academic, essayist, translator, and poet (1929–2020)

- Born: 27 April 1929; Neuilly-sur-Seine, France
- Died: 6 November 2020 (aged 91); Paris, France
- Occupations: Academic; Essayist; Translator; Poet

Bernard Sesé (27 April 1929 – 6 November 2020) was a French academic, essayist, translator, and poet.

== Biography ==
In 1956, Sesé earned an agrégation in Spanish. From 1958 to 1964, he taught Spanish at Mohammed V University in Rabat. He then taught at the University of Paris 1 Pantheon-Sorbonne and Paris Nanterre University. He founded the Iberian collection at Corti and directed biographies for Éditions Desclée de Brouwer. He became a member of the Royal Spanish Academy and published writings on Teresa of Ávila and Luis de León at Éditions Arfuyen.

Sesé served on the editorial board of Sigila at its inception in 1998. Many of his works consisted of translations from Spanish, such as those of Antonio Machado, Juan Ramón Jiménez, or Pedro Calderón de la Barca. He also translated texts from Portuguese by Fernando Pessoa.

Bernard Sesé died in Paris on 6 November 2020, at the age of 91.

== Distinctions ==
- Knight of the Ordre des Palmes académiques
- Commander of the Order of Isabella the Catholic

== Books ==
- Antonio Machado. El hombre. El poeta. El pensedor (1980)
- Petite vie de Jean de la Croix (1990)
- Petite vie d' Élisabeth de la Trinité (1992)
- Petite vie de Pierre Teilhard de Chardin (1996)
- Petite vie d'Édith Stein (2003)
- Petite vie de Thérèse d'Avila (2004)
- Discipline de l'Arcane (2004)
- Petite vie de Madame Acarie Bienheureuse Marie de l'Incarnation (2005)
- Petite vie de Catherine de Sienne (2005)
- Petite vie de François de Sales (2005)
- Vocabulaire de la langue espagnole classique : XVIe et XVIIe siècles (2005)
- Petite vie de Blaise Pascal (2013)
- Ivre de l'horizon (2013)
- Par inadvertance (2013)
- L'Autre et la nuit (2015)
