= S. James Press =

American statistician (1931–2020)

- Born: Sheldon James Press; February 4, 1931; Brooklyn, New York, U.S.
- Died: November 25, 2020 (aged 89)
- Education: University of Southern California; Stanford University
- Occupation: Statistician

Sheldon James Press (February 4, 1931 – November 25, 2020) was an American statistician.

== Life and career ==
Press was born in Brooklyn, New York. He moved to California in 1951. He attended the University of Southern California, earning his master's degree in mathematics. He also attended Stanford University, earning his PhD degree in statistics in 1964.

Press served as a professor in the department of statistics at the University of California, Riverside until 2005. During his years as a professor, he was named a distinguished professor, and in 1981, he was named a fellow of the American Association for the Advancement of Science.

== Death ==
Press died on November 25, 2020, at the age of 89.
