= Mario Pereyra (radio host) =

Argentine radio host and businessman (1943–2020)

Mario Pedro Pereyra (20 July 1943 – 1 November 2020) was an Argentine radio host and businessman.

== Career ==
Born in San Juan he was an influential radio host both in Córdoba Province and nationwide as well. From 1984 until his death in 2020 he hosted one of the most influential radio shows in the region that also had an impact on the local social politics agenda. He was also one of the founders of Cadena 3 Argentina, taking this name in 1998, which expanded to the whole Argentina.

Pereyra was a staunch anti-Peronist and supported Mauricio Macri for President in 2015 (eventually winning the election) and was controversial in some of his interviews such as interviewing military junta (1976–1982) member Luciano Benjamín Menéndez in the late 1980s. During the COVID-19 pandemic in Argentina, he opposed the national lockdown imposed by President Alberto Fernández and said that Argentina was under a "dictatorship".

== Death ==
Pereyra died from COVID-19 at a cardiological clinic in the city of Córdoba on 1 November 2020, aged 77.
