= Lalit Bhati =

Indian politician (1959–2020)

Lalit Shankar Singh Bhati
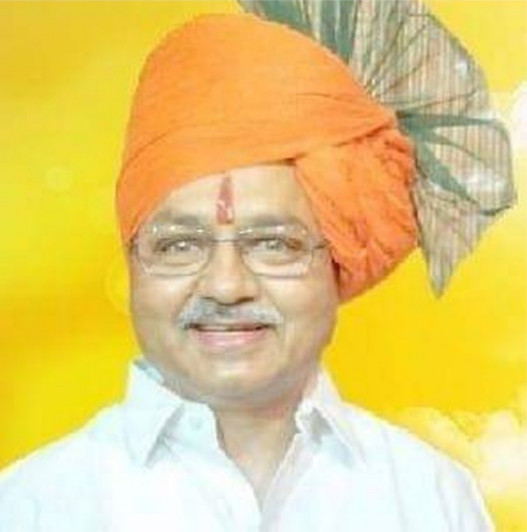
- Lalit Shankar Singh Bhati

Minister of State for Ajmer
- In office 1985–1990
- President: Manmohan Singh
- Constituency: Ajmer South

Member of Legislative Assembly for Ajmer North
- In office 1984–2003

Personal details
- Born: 1959 Ajmer, Rajasthan, India
- Died: 4 November 2020 (aged 60–61) JLN Hospital, Ajmer, Rajasthan, India
- Party: Indian National Congress
- Other political affiliations: Nationalist Congress Party
- Children: 3
- Parent: Shankar Singh Bhati

Lalit Bhati (1959 – 4 November 2020) was an Indian politician who served as a State minister in Rajasthan government and as a senior leader in the Indian National Congress. He was assigned the post of General Secretary in the State Congress Committee and was considered close to Chief Minister Ashok Gehlot.

Mr. Bhati emphasised on Library Legislation and the importance of libraries at grassroot level of the society.

== Early life ==
He was born in Koli family in 1959. His father was Shankar Singh Bhati, a businessperson from Ajmer city in Rajasthan, India.

== Death ==
Lalit Bhati died on 4 November 2020, from causes related to COVID-19. He was admitted to Jawaharlal Nehru Hospital in Ajmer on 3 November after having difficulty breathing and died the following night.
