= Marian Cycoń =

Polish politician (1940–2020)

Marian Cycoń (17 July 1940 – 20 November 2020) was a Polish politician who served as a member of Sejm from 1997 to 2001, and again from 2011 to 2015. Between 1988 and 1990, he was mayor of Nowy Sącz. Cycoń was mayor of Stary Sącz twice, from 1995 to 1998, and 2002 to 2011.
