= Muharrem Fejzo =

Albanian film director (1933–2020)

- Born: 24 May 1933; Kolonjë, Albanian Kingdom
- Died: 22 November 2020 (aged 87)
- Occupation: Film Director
- Awards: People's Artist

Muharrem Fejzo (24 May 1933 – 22 November 2020) was an Albanian film director.

He died from COVID-19 on 22 November 2020, at the age of 87.

== Filmography ==
- Montatorja (1970)
- Kapedani (1972)
- Operacioni "zjarri" (1973)
- Shpërthimi (1974)
- Fije që priten (1976)
- Gunat përmbi tela (1977)
- Pranverë në Gijirokastër (1978)
- Mësonjëtorja (1979)
- Mëngjese të reja (1980)
- Thesari (1981)
- Një emër midis njerëzve (1983)
- Pranverë e hidhur (1985)
- Binarët (1987)
- Muri i gjallë (1989)
