= Ernest Westfield =

American baseball player (1939–2020)

- Pitcher
- Born: November 30, 1939; Cleveland, Tennessee, U.S.
- Died: November 4, 2020 (aged 80); Champaign, Illinois, U.S.
- Threw: Right

Negro league baseball debut
- 1959, for the Birmingham Black Barons

Last appearance
- 1965, for the Birmingham Black Barons

Teams
- Birmingham Black Barons (1959–1965)

Ernest Leon Westfield Sr. (November 30, 1939 – November 4, 2020) was an American right-handed pitcher in Negro league baseball between 1959 and 1965.

A native of Cleveland, Tennessee, Westfield made his Negro leagues debut in 1959 with the Birmingham Black Barons, and played for the club through 1965. At 6' 3" and 160 lbs., he batted and threw right-handed, and was the starting pitcher for the East in the 1960 East-West All-Star Game. Westfield died in Champaign, Illinois, on November 4, 2020, at age 80.
