= Siegfried Hug =

German cross-country skier (1935–2020)

Personal information
- Nationality: German
- Born: 4 December 1935; Titisee-Neustadt, Germany
- Died: 29 November 2020 (aged 84); Hinterzarten, Germany

Sport
- Sport: Cross-country skiing

Siegfried Hug (4 December 1935 – 29 November 2020) was a German cross-country skier. He competed in the men's 30 kilometre event at the 1960 Winter Olympics.
