= Otto Duintjer =

Dutch philosopher (1932–2020)

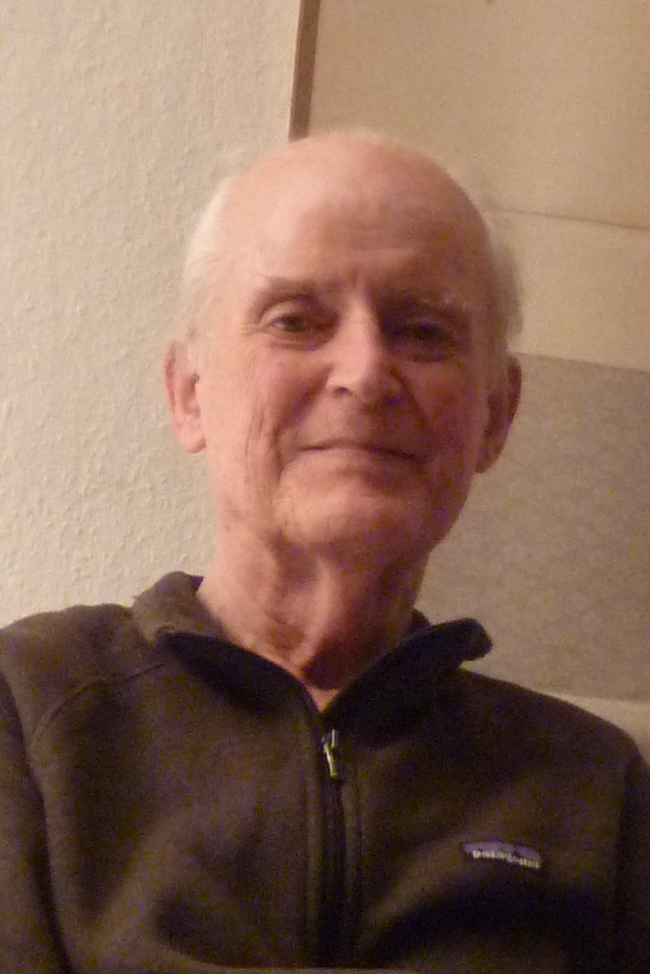
The Dutch philosopher Otto D. Duintjer in 2014

Otto Dirk Duintjer (30 April 1932 – 23 November 2020) was a Dutch philosopher.

== Life ==
He was born in Amsterdam, where he studied theology at the Free University in Amsterdam (VU) and the University of Amsterdam, as well as philosophy at Groningen University. He was an assistant professor at Leiden University from 1960 to 1970, where he obtained his doctorate in philosophy in 1966 (cum laude) with a dissertation entitled The Issue of the Transcendental, Especially in Relation to Heidegger and Kant (in Dutch).

From 1970 to 1987, he was full professor of epistemology and metaphysics at the University of Amsterdam. From 1987 to his retirement in 1997, he held the chair of "Philosophy and Spirituality" at the same university.

In 2004, Duintjer received an honorary doctorate from the Universiteit voor Humanistiek in Utrecht. He was one of the founding members of the Foundation for Philosophy East and West (Stichting Filosofie Oost-West), which organizes philosophy courses for the general audience, and a long-time member of its Program Board. He died in Heemstede, aged 88.

== Bibliography ==
1966, De vraag naar het transcendentale, vooral in verband met Heidegger en Kant. Doctoral dissertation Leiden University, Universitaire Pers Leiden.

1967, 'Moeilijkheden en mogelijkheden bij een verscheidenheid van filosofieën', Wijsgerig Perspectief, 7:5, pp. 255–269.

1970, 'Moderne wetenschap en waardevrijheid', Algemeen Nederlands Tijdschrift voor Wijsbegeerte, 62:1, januari, pp. 22–44. Ook in: T. de Boer en A.J.F. Köbben (red.), Waarden en wetenschap. Bilthoven: Ambo, pp. 20–45.

1977, Rondom regels—wijsgerige gedachten omtrent regelgeleid gedrag. Amsterdam/Meppel: Boom. Derde druk: 1985.

1983, 'Produceren en andere wijzen van mens-zijn. Een onderzoek naar uitgangspunten bij Marx die liggen in het verlengde van de overheersende traditie', Tijdschrift voor Filosofie, 45:3, pp. 421–458.

1984, 'Over natuur, vervreemding en heelwording', in W. Achterberg en W. Zweers (red.), Milieucrisis en filosofie. Amsterdam: Ekologische Uitgeverij, pp. 189–207.

1985, 'Spiritualiteit en de maatschappelijke wedren naar eindeloze expansie', Civis Mundi, 24:4, 162–167.

1986, 'De moderne verstrengeling van wetenschap, techniek en industrie als expansief "Selbstzweck"', in G.M. Huussen en H.E.S. Woldring (red.), Werken met wijsbegeerte: een cultuurprobleem, Delft: Eburon (Filosofische Reeks van de Centrale interfaculteit, Universiteit van Amsterdam, No. 19), pp. 25-36.

1988a, Rondom metafysica. Over 'transcendentie' en de dubbelzinnigheid van metafysica. Amsterdam: Boom

1988b, Hints voor een diagnose. Naar aanleiding van Kant. Baarn: Ambo.

1988c, 'Techniek en werkelijkheid', in A. Dekker (red.), Waarden in onze technische cultuur. Kampen: Kok (Kamper Cahiers, dl. 62), pp. 8–25.

1988d, 'Het belang van nieuwe spiritualiteit in een expansieve maatschappij', in Bruno Nagel (red.), Maken en breken, over produktie en spiritualiteit. Kampen: Kok Agora, pp. 17–43.

2002, Onuitputtelijk is de waarheid. Budel: Damon.

This volume contains revised versions of earlier publications:

- I: Iets over mijn 'zoektocht' (eerder verschenen in: Jan Bor en Ilse Bulhof (red.), Het antwoordloze waarom. Filosoferen tussen Oost en West. Kampen: Agora, 2001, pp. 49–69)
- II: Eros en 'transcendentie' bij Plato (eerder verschenen in: H.P. Kunneman en Th. C.W. Oudemans, Filosoferen aan de grens. Assen: Van Gorcum, 1992, pp. 160–180)
- III: Over het primaat van waarheid (als 'openbaarwordingsgebeuren') (eerder verschenen in: Prana, 23:1, 1997, pp. 82–91; Tijdschrift voor Filosofie, 64:1, 2002)
- IV: Spiritualiteit: een optie voor humanisten? (eerder verschenen in: Rekenschap, 40:2, juni 1993, pp. 69–73; ook in Iteke Weeda (red.), Spiritualiteit en wetenschap. Amsterdam: Anthos, 1996, pp. 270–78)
- V: Herkenning en bedenkingen bij Advaita Vedanta (eerder verschenen in: Douwe Tiemersma (red.), De vraag naar het zelf-zijn. Rotterdam: Asoka, 201, pp. 65–83)
- Appendix: Perestrojka in het Westen? (eerder verschenen in: Trouw, 1 December 1989)

2007, 'De innerlijke weg: hoezo?' in Theo van Leeuwen en Heidi Muijen (red.), De innerlijke weg. Spirituele tradities over verinnerlijking, Kampen: Ten Have, pp. 18–34.
