= Patrick Chokala =

Tanzanian diplomat (1948–2020)

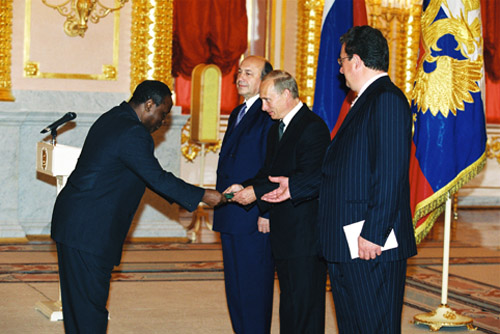
Chokala

Patrick Segeja Chokala (3 March 1948 – 6 November 2020) was an ambassador of the United Republic of Tanzania to the Russian Federation.
