= Kenneth C. Smith Sr. =

American politician

Member of the New Hampshire House of Representatives from the Carroll 3rd district
- In office 1974–1982

Personal details
- Born: Kenneth Charles Smith; July 10, 1932 Moultonborough, New Hampshire, U.S.
- Died: November 27, 2020 (aged 88) Fort Myers, Florida, U.S.
- Party: Republican
- Education: Norwich University

Kenneth Charles Smith (July 10, 1932 – November 27, 2020) was an American politician. A member of the Republican Party, he served in the New Hampshire House of Representatives from 1974 to 1982.

== Life and career ==
Smith was born in Moultonborough, New Hampshire, the son of Charles and Lois Smith. He attended Norwich University on a football scholarship.

Smith served in the New Hampshire House of Representatives from 1974 to 1982. He lost his seat in the House, in 1982, when he ran as a Republican candidate for register of deeds of Carroll County, New Hampshire. He received 1,234 votes, but lost in the Republican primary election to candidate Lillian O. Brookes, who won with 4,318 votes.

== Death ==
Smith died on November 27, 2020, in Fort Myers, Florida, at the age of 88.
