= Mony Elkaïm =

Moroccan-Belgian psychiatrist and psychotherapist (1941–2020)

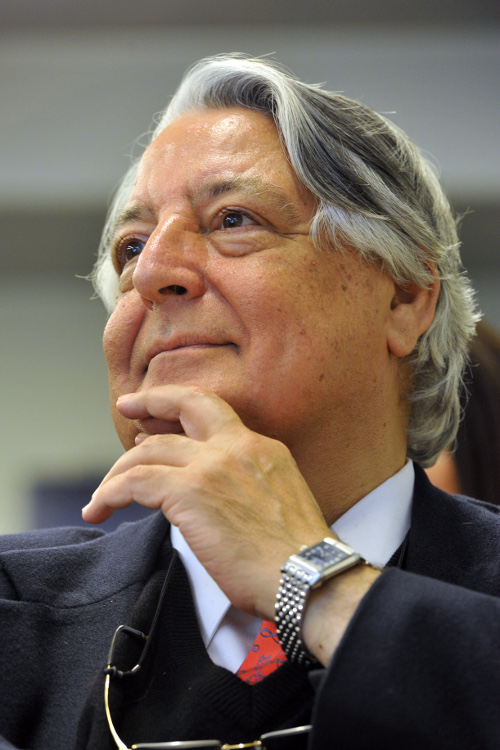
- Elkaïm in 2014
- Born: 7 November 1941; Marrakesh, French Morocco
- Died: 20 November 2020 (aged 79); Brussels, Belgium
- Occupations: Psychiatrist; Psychotherapist

Mony Elkaïm (7 November 1941 – 20 November 2020) was a Moroccan-Belgian psychiatrist and psychotherapist. He was a part of the anti-psychiatry movement in the 1970s.

== Publications ==
- Réseau Alternative à la psychiatrie (1977)
- Formations et pratiques en thérapie familiale (1985)
- Les pratiques de réseaux : santé mentale et contexte social (1987)
- Si tu m’aimes, ne m’aime pas. Approche systémique et psychothérapie (1989)
- La thérapie familiale en changement (1994)
- Panorama des thérapies familiales
- À quel psy se vouer ? Psychanalyses, psychothérapies : les principales approches (2003)
- Comment survivre à sa propre famille ? (2006)
- Comprendre et traiter la souffrance psychique (2007)
- Entre résilience et résonance. À l’écoute des émotions (2009)
- Où es-tu quand je te parle? (2014)
- Vivre en couple. Plaidoyer pour une stratégie du pire (2017)
