= Barbara York =

Canadian-American composer

Barbara York née Spence (23 February 1949 – 6 November 2020) was a Canadian-American composer and pianist. She is noted for her many contributions to chamber and solo repertoire for low brass instruments like tuba, trombone, and euphonium.

== Biography ==
Barbara York was born in Winnipeg to Edith (née Pitblado) and Howard Spence and was the youngest of their three children. She began taking piano lessons when she was around four years old, and then learned cello in middle and high school. She began composing original music as early as age seven. She later claimed, "In first grade, I wrote an essay about what I wanted to be when I grew up: a music teacher... I never wanted to be anything else."

York attended McGill University and graduated with a Bachelor's degree in music when she was twenty years old. After graduating, she worked at the Manitoba Theater School as a teacher, but soon after moved to Toronto. For the next ten or so years, York worked in theater, performing a variety of roles including arranging, directing, and composing. She moved to Kansas City in 1993, and focused on her career as a collaborative pianist while also working as an elementary school music teacher and church/school choir accompanist. She was hired to accompany tubist Michael Fischer at a Pittsburg State University student recital, and was immediately fascinated by the sound of the solo tuba. She learned how to write for tuba based on her time accompanying performers and from consultation orchestration textbooks, and then the rest, according to her, was "pure instinct." York asked Fischer if he would mind if she wrote a piece for him, and her very first work for tuba, Sea Dreams, was the result. This piece later became a required piece for ITEA's 2004 Young Artists competition.

York died at her home in Pittsburg, Kansas in 2020 from pulmonary fibrosis.

=== Awards and Honors ===
Barbara York (at the time Barbara Spence Potter) won the Dora Mavor Moore Award for Outstanding New Score in 1981 for a production entitled Colette. A recording of her work A Butterfly in Time nominated for Children's Album of the Year at the 2006 Juno Awards.

Conversations, York's work for euphonium, saxophone, and piano, won the Euphonium Chamber Division of the International Tuba Euphonium Association Harvey Phillips Award for Composition in 2006. She was the first woman to be awarded the ITEA Lifetime Achievement Award, making her one of three woman who have now earned the honor (alongside Constance Weldon and Mary Ann Craig).

=== Legacy ===
Between 2017 and 2021, York's works comprised 80% of the music by women composers performed by on recitals at ITEA events.

When asked about her perception of her legacy, York stated:

“My greatest idea of success would be that I was still being played, that I would still be, in some way, part of standard repertoire for people. Because in that sense, it means that I would have some legacy. I feel like my music has been useful to people, especially low brass players, in terms of filling in holes in the repertoire, and also useful to people in terms of giving them an expression for things and emotions that they didn’t have an expression for. Other than that, I have no idea if I even have a legacy.”

== List of works ==
=== Chamber music ===
- A Caged Bird for trombone, bass trombone, or euphonium and piano
- Amuses-bouches: 10 duets with recipes from Gerard Gabehart for flute and trumpet
- Arioso Gloria for clarinet, euphonium, or tuba and piano
- Aspects for brass quintet
- Autumn Whimsy for clarinet trio
- Concerto: War Games for bass trombone and piano
- Contrabassoon Sonata: The Sunken Garden
- Conversations for alto saxophone and euphonium
- De Profundis for tuba and piano
- Duo Sonata: "Wisdom of our Fathers" for alto saxophone, piano, and trumpet
- Elegy for an Angel for tuba and piano
- Elements for clarinet quartet
- Every Day an Alleluia for two horns or two tubas and piano
- For Beth my One and Only for tuba and piano
- For the Children for tuba and piano
- Four Paintings by Grant Wood for tuba and piano
- Fragile Dreams for flugelhorn, tuba, and piano
- How Beautiful for tuba and piano
- Lullaby for Twins for tuba and euphonium
- Measuring Time for flute, piano, and violin
- Memories of Things both Lost and Found for horn, euphonium and piano
- Montreal Suite for brass quintet
- Moral Dilemmas for tuba and percussion
- Nautical Myths and Legends for tuba and piano
- Nocturne for trombone quartet
- Nordic Suite for trombone, tuba, and piano
- Nostalgia for trumpet and piano
- Personalities for horn, euphonium, and tuba
- Pilgrimage and Reunion for low brass quartet
- Prayer and Confession to Santa Cecilia for tuba and piano
- Psalm 121 for voice and piano
- Sea Dreams for tuba and piano
- Snapshots for tuba and piano
- Sonata for bassoon and piano
- Sonata for Euphonium and Piano: "Child's Play"
- Sonata for Flute and Piano: "Simple Virtues"
- Sonata for Horn and Piano: "Landscapes"
- Sonata for Saxophone and Piano: "Meditations on Rumi"
- Sonata from trombone (tenor and alto) with piano
- Sonata for Tuba and Piano: Shamanic Journey
- Sonata No. 2: "Making Changes" for saxophone and piano
- Sonata No. 2: Tasting Love for tuba and piano
- Sonata No. 2: "Tidings of Comfort and Joy" for bass clarinet, euphonium, and piano
- Sonata: "Bone Dances" for trombone and piano
- Sonata: "Innocence" for clarinet and piano
- Sonatina for piano: "Favorite Things"
- "Spiral Road" for baritone or mezzo-soprano voice and piano
- Still Waters Running Deep for cello and piano
- Suite: Dancing with Myself for horn or euphonium, tuba, and piano
- Talking to Myself for euphonium and piano
- Tennessee Journey for tuba and piano
- The Lion and the Mouse for trumpet/piccolo trumpet, euphonium, and piano
- The PC Quartet: "Traditional Values" for low brass quartet
- The Slaughter of the Innocents for trombone and piano
- Three Odd Dances for alto saxophone and piano
- Three Romances for Susie for trombone or tuba and piano
- Through the Tunnel for tuba and piano

=== Choral music ===
- A House of Prayer for SATB, baritone voice, cello, horn, and English horn
- Waiting for the Wise Men for SATB and instrumental ensemble

=== Concertos and large ensemble works ===
- Concerto for Euphonium: "Creative States"
- Concerto for Tuba and Orchestra: "War and Rumors of War"
- Directions: Concerto for tuba and wind ensemble
- Encountering Baba Yaga for alto saxophone and wind ensemble
- Fantasy Suite on "Hot Cross Buns" for wind ensemble
- Like an April Day for brass ensemble and percussion
- Peggy's Violin: A Butterfly in Time for narrator, violin, and chamber orchestra
- Prophecies for euphonium or tuba and brass band
- Ripples for brass ensemble and percussion
- River of Stars for wind ensemble
- Shades of Purple for tuba ensemble
- The Dark Chocolate Suite for tuba ensemble

== Discography ==
- Elegy for an Angel appears on Angels and Demons. Tim Buzbee (tuba) and Faith Debow (piano). Troy Records (2012).
- Duo Sonata: "Wisdom of our Fathers" appears on Sax Spectrum 1: New Music for Alto and Soprano Saxophone. Glen Gillis (alto saxophone), Richard Gillis (trumpet), Bonnie Nicholson (piano). MSR Classics (2009).
- Nordic Suite appears on Harambee: Canadian Music for Trombone. Dale Sorensen (trombone), Jonathan Roswell (tuba), Vanessa May-lok Lee (piano). Pinegrove Music (2015).
- Peggy's Violin: A Butterfly in Time. Narrated by Angela Fusco. Children's Group (2007).
- Shamanic Journey appears on Shamanic Journey. Deanna Swoboda (tuba), Gail Novak (piano). Potenza Music (2011).
- Sonata No. 2: "Making Changes" appears on Sax Spectrum 2: New Music for Alto and Soprano Saxophone. Glen Gillis (alto saxophone), Bonnie Nicholson (piano). MSR Classics (2014).
- Still Waters Running Deep appears on Red Dragonfly. Jemmie Robertson (trombone) and Jasmin Arakawa (piano). Mark Records (2021).
- Dancing with Myself (horn version) appears on Anonim. Chris Dickey (tuba), Martin D. King (horn), Yoon-Wha Roh (piano). Centaur (2023).
- The Dark Chocolate Suite and The PC Qurartet appear on Fanfare and Flourish. RSVB Quartet: Gail Roberts, Deanna Swoboda, Lauren Veronie, and Stacy Baker. Potenza Music.
- Three Odd Dances appears on SaxSpectrum 3 – New Music for Alto and Soprano Saxophone. Glen Gillis (alto saxophone), Bonnie Nicholson (piano). MSR Classics (2022).
