= Léo de Almeida Neves =

Brazilian politician (1932–2020)

Léo de Almeida Neves (1932 – 2 November 2020) was a Brazilian politician who served as a member of the Chamber of Deputies from 1966 till 1969 and also from 1982 to 1987.

He later served as a member of the Senate from 1995 to 2003.

Neves died from COVID-19 in São Paulo on 2 November 2020, at the age of 88, during the COVID-19 pandemic in Brazil.
