= Konrad Hünteler =

German flutist (1947–2020)

- Born: 12 March 1947; Mechernich, North Rhine-Westphalia, Germany
- Died: 13 November 2020 (aged 73); Münster, Germany
- Occupation: Flutist

Konrad Hünteler (12 March 1947 – 13 November 2020) was a German flutist who specialized in Baroque music and followed the practice of historically informed performance.

== Biography ==
Hünteler studied the recorder, the transverse flute, and the baroque flute. As a soloist, he performed with the Amsterdam Baroque Orchestra & Choir, the Collegium Aureum, the Cappella Coloniensis, the London Classical Players, and the Orchestra of the Eighteenth Century. He was a professor of the flute at the Musikhochschule Münster from 1979 to 2012. He often performed alongside Anner Bylsma, Bob van Asperen, and Jacques Ogg. He became an honorary member of the German Flute Association in 2001.

Konrad Hünteler died in Münster on 13 November 2020 at the age of 73.

== Discography ==
- Flötenkonzerte (1981)
- Flötenkonzerte 1 & 2 (1987, 1991)
- Flötenquartette (1995, 2002)
- Fantasien
- Werke für Flöte (2013)
