= Edward Flak =

Polish politician (1948–2020)

Edward Flak (13 May 1948 – 11 November 2020) was a Polish politician, lawyer and member of the German minority. He was mayor of Olesno from 1990 to 1994 and 1998 to 2006, as well as a member of the Sejm from 1992 to 1993.
