= Daniel Yonnet =

French literary critic (1933–2020)

- Born: 10 June 1933; Fontenay-le-Comte, France
- Died: 9 November 2020 (aged 87)
- Occupation: Literary Critic

Daniel Yonnet (10 June 1933 – 9 November 2020) was a French literary critic, writer, and journalist. In 1982, he received the Prix Jean-Le-Duc alongside Pierre Schoendoerffer and Jean-François Chauvel for the film A Captain's Honor.

Yonnet was mobilized for the Algerian War, which inspired him to delve into journalism. He worked for Le Télégramme in Brest and Ouest-France. He became departmental director for Finistère with Ouest-France from 1973 to 1984 and director of the editorial staff in Cherbourg-Octeville. He also became a literary critic.

Yonnet was the author of several books on Brittany, including several in collaboration with photographer Michel Thersiquel. He was a member of the honorary committee of the International House of Poets and Writers Saint-Malo.

Daniel Yonnet died on 9 November 2020 at the age of 87.

== Publications ==
- Le Printemps du fossoyeur (1981)
- Ballade pour une femme (1985)
- La Marche des anges ou l'annonce volée (1987)
- Le Diable et l'exorciste (1993)
- Nos années de Breizh (1998)
- Le Finistère des peintres (1999)
- La Bretagne aimée des peintres Quimperlé-Pont-Aven-Concarneau (2001)
- La Bretagne vue du ciel (2006)
