= František Reichel =

Czech politician (1938–2020)

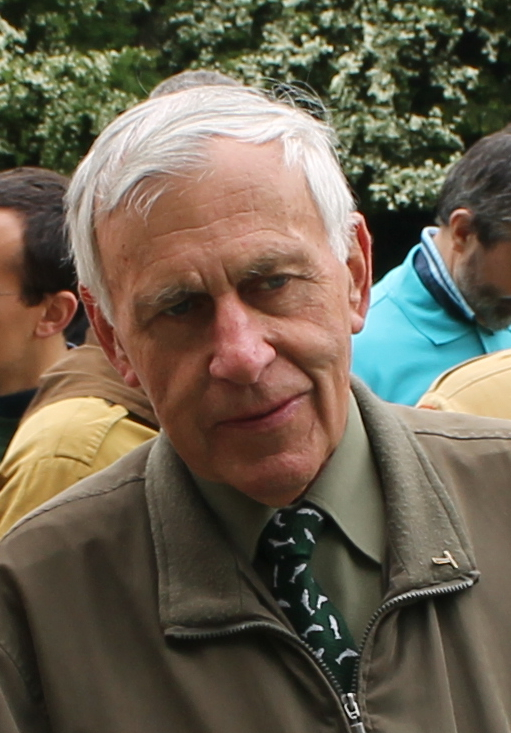
František Reichel (2013)

František Reichel (27 January 1938 – 20 November 2020) was a Czech politician who served as Deputy Prime Minister of Czechoslovakia from 1989 to 1990.
