= Dan W. Urry =

American biophysicist and chemist

Dan Wesley Urry
- Born: September 14, 1935; Salt Lake City, Utah, US
- Died: November 30, 2020 (aged 85)
- Education: University of Utah
- Known for: Research on bioelastic materials and protein-based polymers
- Spouse: Kathleen Lake
- Children: 4
- Awards: Alexander von Humboldt Foundation Prize (1979-1980); Scientist of the Year Award (1988); Albert Nelson Marquis Lifetime Achievement Award (2018)
- Scientific career
- Fields: Biophysics, chemistry
- Workplaces: Institute of Biomedical Research, The American Medical Association; University of Alabama at Birmingham; University of Minnesota-Twin Cities
- Doctoral advisor: Henry Eyring

Dan Wesley Urry (September 14, 1935 – November 30, 2020) was an American biophysicist and chemist known for his work in the field of molecular biophysics, particularly in the study of bioelastic materials and protein-based polymers. Urry published over 490 scientific papers, held 28 US patents, and was a well cited scientist in the 1980s.

== Early life and education ==
Urry earned his BA degree in medical biology in 1960 from the University of Utah, where he graduated with high honors. He continued his studies at the University of Utah, obtaining a PhD in physical chemistry in 1964 under the mentorship of Henry Eyring.

== Academic and research career ==
He began as a fellow at Harvard University and the University of California, Berkeley, before joining the Institute of Biomedical Research of The American Medical Association in 1965. He became a tenured full member in 1969 and concurrently held a position as professorial lecturer at the University of Chicago.

At the University of Alabama at Birmingham he served from 1970 to 1997 as professor of biochemistry and the director of the Laboratory of Molecular Biophysics, with additional appointments in physiology, biophysics, and adjunct professor of physics.

From 1997 to 2008, Urry continued his academic career at the University of Minnesota-Twin Cities, where he was a professor of chemical engineering and materials science, and later Professor of Biophysics.

== Awards and honors ==
- Alexander von Humboldt Foundation Prize (1979–1980)
- Scientist of the Year Award from R&D Magazine (1988)
- Albert Nelson Marquis Lifetime Achievement Award (2018)
- Fellow of the American Institute of Medical and Biological Engineering

== Personal life and legacy ==
Urry was married to Kathleen Lake, with whom he had one child. And was previously married in which he had three boys.
