= Lon Adams =

American food scientist (1925–2020)

Alonzo Theodore Adams II (March 15, 1925 – November 28, 2020) was an American food scientist who was the inventor and creator of the modern day snack brand Slim Jim. He received his undergrad degree from St. Ambrose University in Davenport, Iowa, and his Master's degree from Iowa State University in Ames, Iowa. The New York Times labeled him the "Father" of the Slim Jim in an article written in 1996. Adams worked for Conagra Brands for most of his career. Adams was a World War II veteran, serving in the 82nd Airborne Division, who was in the Battle of the Bulge, in which he survived being shot in the head. He died from COVID-19 at a hospital in Raleigh, North Carolina, on November 28, 2020, at the age of 95.
