= Hussein Al-Zuhairi =

Iraqi politician (died 2020)

- حسين الزهيري

Personal details
- Born: Hussein Jasim Al-Zuhairi Iraq
- Died: 24 November 2020 Lebanon

Hussein Jasim Al-Zuhairi (Note: Arabic: حسين جاسم الزهيري, romanized: Ḥusayn Jāsim al-Zuhayrī) (died 24 November 2020) was an Iraqi politician.

== Life and career ==
Born in Iraq, Al-Zuhairi served in the Council of Representatives of Iraq representing Diyala Governorate. He was also deputy minister of human rights and deputy minister of justice.

He died of COVID-19 complications in Lebanon on 24 November 2020.
