= Yairus Gwijangge =

Indonesian politician (1968–2020)

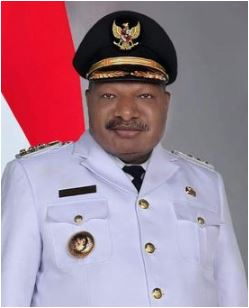

1st Regent of Nduga
- In office 30 September 2011 – 15 November 2020
- Governor: Lukas Enembe
- Preceded by: position established
- Succeeded by: Wentius Nimiangge

Personal details
- Born: 31 December 1968 Nduga, West Irian, Indonesia
- Died: 15 November 2020 (aged 51) Jakarta, Indonesia

Yairus Gwijangge (31 December 1968 – 15 November 2020) was an Indonesian politician who served as Regent of Nduga from 30 September 2011 to his death on 15 November 2020 in two consecutive terms. He was the first regent of Nduga. He died in Jakarta.
