= John Sedgley =

English cricketer (1939–2020)

Personal information
- Full name: John Brian Sedgley
- Born: 17 February 1939; West Bromwich, England
- Died: 29 November 2020 (aged 81)
- Batting: Right-handed

Domestic team information
- Years: Team
- 1959–1961: Worcestershire

Career statistics
Competition	FC
Matches	15
Runs scored	389
Batting average	15.56
100s/50s	0/2
Top score	95
Balls bowled	0
Wickets	0
Bowling average	-
5 wickets in innings	0
10 wickets in match	0
Best bowling	-
Catches/stumpings	7/0
- Source: CricketArchive, 24 April 2021

John Brian Sedgley (17 February 1939 – 29 November 2020) was an English cricketer who played first-class cricket for Worcestershire between 1959 and 1961.

Sedgley's first two first-class games, in 1959, were against Cambridge and Oxford Universities respectively. In 1960 he appeared on 11 occasions, and made his highest score in June when he scored 95 against Derbyshire before being run out. His first-class career was completed in 1961 with two matches in June, in neither of which was he successful.
