= Robert L. Farmer =

American judge and politician

Member of the North Carolina House of Representatives
- In office 1971–???

Personal details
- Born: July 23, 1933 Johnston County, North Carolina, U.S.
- Died: November 17, 2020 (aged 87)
- Party: Democratic
- Spouse: Martha Lassiter (m. 1959)
- Children: 3
- Education: University of North Carolina; University of North Carolina School of Law
- Occupation: Judge

Robert L. Farmer (July 23, 1933 – November 17, 2020) was an American judge and politician. He served as a Democratic member of the North Carolina House of Representatives.

== Life and career ==
Farmer was born in Johnston County, North Carolina. He attended Smithfield High School, the University of North Carolina and the University of North Carolina School of Law. He served in the United States Army.

In 1971, Farmer was elected to the North Carolina House of Representatives. In 1977, he was appointed by Governor Jim Hunt to serve as a judge for the Resident Superior Court, serving until 1999.

Farmer died in November 2020, at the age of 87.
