= Jan Vrba (politician) =

Czech politician (1937–2020)

Jan Vrba (3 June 1937 – 4 November 2020) was a Czech politician who served as Minister of Industry between 1990 and 1992.

He was born in Prague. Vrba died from COVID-19 in November 2020, at age 83, during the COVID-19 pandemic in the Czech Republic.
