= List of Guggenheim Fellowships awarded in 1992 =

One hundred and forty-nine scholars, artists, and scientists received Guggenheim Fellowships in 1992. $3,925,000 was disbursed between the recipients, who were chosen from an applicant pool of 3,162.

== 1992 U.S. and Canadian Fellows ==
Category	Field of Study	Fellow	Institutional association	Research topic	Notes	Ref
Creative Arts	Choreography	Neil Greenberg	SUNY Purchase			
Creative Arts	Drama & Performance Art	Anthony Clarvoe		Playwriting		
Creative Arts	Drama & Performance Art	Janie Geiser	Janie Geiser & Co.	Puppetry		
Creative Arts	Fiction	Gish Jen		Writing		
Creative Arts	Fiction	Brian Kiteley		Writing		
Creative Arts	Fiction	Norman Manea	Bard College	Writing		
Creative Arts	Fiction	Annie Proulx		Writing		
Creative Arts	Fiction	Matthew Stadler		Writing		
Creative Arts	Fiction	Christopher Tilghman	Emerson College	Writing		
Creative Arts	Film	Flip Johnson	Boston Museum School	Animated short film: Water/Shed		
Creative Arts	Film	Lewis Klahr		Filmmaking		
Creative Arts	Film	Nina Menkes	California Institute of the Arts	Filmmaking		
Creative Arts	Film	Pat O'Neill		Filmmaking		
Creative Arts	Film	Jan Oxenberg		Filmmaking		
Creative Arts	Film	Maureen Selwood	California Institute of the Arts	Filmmaking		
Creative Arts	Fine Arts	Walton Ford		Painting		
Creative Arts	Fine Arts	Jill Giegerich	UC Riverside	Artwork; also, shadow plays and other religious rituals in Bali		
Creative Arts	Fine Arts	Guy Goodwin	Cooper Union	Painting		
Creative Arts	Fine Arts	Sharon Horvath		Painting		
Creative Arts	Fine Arts	Suzanne Lacy	California College of the Arts	Performance art		
Creative Arts	Fine Arts	Barry Ledoux		Sculpture		
Creative Arts	Fine Arts	Erik Levine		Sculpture		
Creative Arts	Fine Arts	John Newman	Yale University	Sculpture		
Creative Arts	Fine Arts	Rona Pondick	Parsons School of Design	Sculpture		
Creative Arts	Fine Arts	Mira Schor		Painting		
Creative Arts	Fine Arts	Drew E. Shiflett		Sculpture		
Creative Arts	Fine Arts	Romey Stuckart	Montana State University (visiting)	Painting		
Creative Arts	Fine Arts	Mary Ann Unger		Sculpture: Dark Icons		
Creative Arts	Music Composition	Richard Argosh		Composing		
Creative Arts	Music Composition	Ronald Caltabiano		Composing		
Creative Arts	Music Composition	Sebastian Currier	Juilliard School	Composing		
Creative Arts	Music Composition	John Gibson	Princeton University	Composing		
Creative Arts	Music Composition	James Mobberley	University of Missouri-Kansas City and Kansas City Symphony (in residence)	Composing		
Creative Arts	Music Composition	James Newton	California Institute of the Arts	Jazz compositions		
Creative Arts	Music Composition	Richard Wilson	Vassar College	Comedic opera about Æthelred the Unready		
Creative Arts	Photography	Jerald Frampton		Western culture as depicted in American movies		
Creative Arts	Photography	Jacqueline Hayden	Hampshire College (visiting)	Photographing "elderly people who model nude in classical poses for classes at art schools" to examine the intersection of beauty and aging		
Creative Arts	Photography	Gilles Peress				
Creative Arts	Photography	Curt Richter				
Creative Arts	Photography	David M. Spear				
Creative Arts	Photography	Ryan Weideman		Portraits of taxi drivers		
Creative Arts	Poetry	T. R. Hummer	Middlebury College and New England Review	Writing		
Creative Arts	Poetry	Jane Kenyon		Writing		
Creative Arts	Poetry	Susan Mitchell	Florida Atlantic University	Writing		
Creative Arts	Poetry	Donald Revell	University of Denver	Writing		
Creative Arts	Poetry	Elizabeth Spires	Johns Hopkins University and Goucher College	Writing		
Creative Arts	Poetry	Adam Zagajewski	University of Houston	Writing		
Creative Arts	Video & Audio	Irit Batsry				
Humanities	American Literature	Charles Berger	University of Utah	Wallace Stevens' poetry		
Humanities	American Literature	Jay Parini	Middlebury College	Biography of John Steinbeck		
Humanities	Architecture, Planning, & Design	Jean Paul Bourdier	UC Berkeley	Rural dwellings in Senegal		
Humanities	Architecture, Planning, & Design	Marc Treib	UC Berkeley	Modern landscape architecture in Europe, 1930-1955		
Humanities	Bibliography	Menahem Schmelzer	Jewish Theological Seminary of America	The Hebrew book and the Jewish mind		
Humanities	Biography	James Atlas		Saul Bellow		
Humanities	Biography	Gale E. Christianson	Indiana State University	Edwin Hubble		
Humanities	Biography	Rosemary Sullivan	University of Toronto	Gwendolyn McEwen		
Humanities	British History	David Harris Sacks	Reed College	Monopoly and liberty in early modern England, 1558-1649		
Humanities	British History	Robert C. Stacey	University of Washington	English Jews in the Middle Ages		
Humanities	Classics	H. Alan Shapiro	Stevens Institute of Technology	Athenian hero cults		
Humanities	Economic History	Thomas G. Rawski	University of Pittsburgh	Reform and innovation in Chinese industry		
Humanities	English Literature	Paul Alpers	UC Berkeley	Definition and literary history of pastoral		
Humanities	English Literature	Robert DeMaria Jr.	Vassar College	Samuel Johnson's life of reading		
Humanities	English Literature	Vicki Mahaffey	University of Pennsylvania	Politics of representation		
Humanities	English Literature	Richard C. McCoy	Queens College and Graduate Center CUNY	Succession crisis of 1603		
Humanities	English Literature	Michael North	UCLA	Race, dialect, and the emergence of modernism		
Humanities	English Literature	Wayne A. Rebhorn	University of Texas-Austin	Renaissance discourse of rhetoric		
Humanities	English Literature	Jeffrey C. Robinson	University of Chicago	Sexuality and the poetry of Keats		
Humanities	English Literature	Marlon B. Ross	University of Michigan	Cultural history of romance in Britain, 1760-1900		
Humanities	Film, Video, & Radio Studies	Rey Chow	University of Minnesota	Contemporary Chinese cinema		
Humanities	Fine Arts Research	James S. Ackerman		Origins of classicism		
Humanities	Fine Arts Research	Whitney Davis	Northwestern University	Classicism		
Humanities	Fine Arts Research	Debora L. Silverman	UCLA	Art, craft, and religion in the life and work of Vincent van Gogh		
Humanities	Folklore & Popular Culture	Regina Bendix		Concept of authenticity in folklore studies		
Humanities	French History	Jan Goldstein	University of Chicago	Psychology and selfhood in 19th-century France		
Humanities	French History	E. William Monter	Northwestern University	Persecution in Renaissance France		
Humanities	French Literature	Elaine Marks	University of Wisconsin-Madison	Jewish presence in French writing		
Humanities	General Nonfiction	Robert Grudin	University of Oregon	Nature of free thought		
Humanities	General Nonfiction	Eva Hoffman		"A journey through eastern Europe"		
Humanities	General Nonfiction	Scott R. Sanders	Indiana University	Sense of place		
Humanities	General Nonfiction	Lucy Sante		Idea of nationality		
Humanities	German & East European History	Isabel V. Hull	Cornell University	Sexuality and the state in Germany, 1700-1815		
Humanities	German & Scandinavian Literature	Valerie D. Greenberg	Tulane University	Freud's readings on language		
Humanities	History of Science & Technology	Richard W. Burkhardt Jr.	University of Illinois at Urbana-Champaign	Emergency of ethology as a scientific discipline, 1945-1965		
Humanities	Iberian & Latin American History	Mario T. García	Yale University	Chicanos in Los Angeles, 1965-1975		
Humanities	Iberian & Latin American History	Irene Silverblatt	University of Connecticut	Social history of indigenous Andean ideologies		
Humanities	Intellectual & Cultural History	Bonnie G. Smith	Rutgers University	Gender and the practice of scientific history, 1800-1940		
Humanities	Linguistics	Janet Dean Fodor	Graduate Center CUNY	Phrase structure grammar		
Humanities	Linguistics	John J. McCarthy	University of Massachusetts-Amherst	Relationship between word formation and syllable structure in language		
Humanities	Literary Criticism	Linda Hutcheon	University of Toronto	Theory of irony		
Humanities	Literary Criticism	Teresa de Lauretis	UC Santa Cruz	Fantasy and Female Subjectivity: a Feminist Reevaluation of Freud's Theory of Sexuality		
Humanities	Literary Criticism	Mark Turner	University of Maryland	Research in Del Mar, California		
Humanities	Medieval Literature	Daniel Poirion	Yale University	Allegorical text of desire in medieval French literature		
Humanities	Medieval Literature	Nancy Freeman Regalado	New York University	Paris Pentecost feast of 1313		
Humanities	Music Research	Jeffrey Kallberg	University of Pennsylvania	Historical discourses of gender in instrumental music, 1800-1848		
Humanities	Music Research	James Webster	Cornell University	Analysis of Mozart's operas		
Humanities	Near Eastern Studies	Gregory Jusdanis	Ohio State University	Construction of a modern Greek national culture		
Humanities	Philosophy	David Gauthier	University of Pittsburgh	Rational commitment		
Humanities	Photography Studies	Shelley Rice	New York University	Photography in France and Haussmann's renovation of Paris		
Humanities	Religion	Daniel Boyarin	UC Berkeley	Rabbinic representations of the female body		
Humanities	Religion	Howard Eilberg-Schwartz	Stanford University	Moses, masculinity, and monotheism		
Humanities	Renaissance History	James Hankins	Harvard University	Biography of Leonardo Bruni		
Humanities	Science Writing	Israel Rosenfield	John Jay College of Criminal Justice	Explanation and prediction in the neurosciences		
Humanities	Slavic Literature	Irina Paperno	UC Berkeley	Suicide as a cultural institution in Russia		
Humanities	South Asian Studies	Phillip B. Zarrilli	University of Wisconsin-Madison	Emotional expression in India's kathakali theater		
Humanities	United States History	Thomas A. Green	University of Michigan	American criminal trial jury and concepts of freedom since 1800		
Humanities	United States History	Thomas P. Slaughter	Rutgers University	The Bartrams, nature, and the American Enlightenment		
Humanities	United States History	Susan Strasser	George Washington University	Social history of household trash in the US		
Natural Sciences	Applied Mathematics	Bruce Hajek	University of Illinois at Urbana-Champaign	Stochastic algorithms		
Natural Sciences	Astronomy—Astrophysics	Stuart Bowyer	UC Berkeley	Extreme ultraviolet astronomy		
Natural Sciences	Astronomy—Astrophysics	Robert D. Mathieu	University of Wisconsin-Madison	Evolution of accretion disks in the young binary environment		
Natural Sciences	Chemistry	Héctor D. Abruña	Cornell University	Structural studies of electrochemical interfaces		
Natural Sciences	Chemistry	James B. Callis	University of Washington	Non-invasive spectroscopic monitoring of a bioprocess		
Natural Sciences	Chemistry	R. J. Dwayne Miller	University of Rochester	Basic chemical reaction that allows organisms to detect light		
Natural Sciences	Earth Science	Ian Carmichael	UC Berkeley	Geological connection of the Jalisco Block to the rest of Mexico		
Natural Sciences	Earth Science	Ronald L. Shreve	UCLA	Physics of sand and gravel transport by rivers		
Natural Sciences	Engineering	Arto V. Nurmikko	Brown University	Optical investigations of semiconductor materials		
Natural Sciences	Mathematics	Philip J. Hanlon	University of Michigan	Algebraic combinatorics		
Natural Sciences	Mathematics	Richard B. Melrose	Massachusetts Institute of Technology	Analysis and geometry of manifolds with corners		
Natural Sciences	Mathematics	Ilya Piatetski-Shapiro	Yale University and Tel-Aviv University	Automorphic forms		
Natural Sciences	Medicine & Health	Arthur Kleinman	Harvard University	Social experiences of suffering		
Natural Sciences	Molecular & Cellular Biology	Mina J. Bissell	UC Berkeley	Research in Paris		
Natural Sciences	Molecular & Cellular Biology	William A. Cramer	Purdue University	Crystallization of proteins from biological membranes		
Natural Sciences	Molecular & Cellular Biology	Michael B. Mathews	Cold Spring Harbor Laboratory	Control of transcription by the AIDS virus		
Natural Sciences	Molecular & Cellular Biology	Douglas H. Turner	University of Rochester	Ways to predict the 3D structure of RNA		
Natural Sciences	Neuroscience	Edward A. Kravitz	Harvard University	Analysis of differences in messenger RNA between identified single neurons		
Natural Sciences	Organismic Biology & Ecology	Douglas J. Futuyma	SUNY Stony Brook	Model systems for the study of evolution		
Natural Sciences	Organismic Biology & Ecology	Thomas W. Schoener	UC Davis	Ecology of subtropical islands		
Natural Sciences	Organismic Biology & Ecology	Thomas D. Seeley	Cornell University	Collective intelligence of honey bees		
Natural Sciences	Physics	Sudip Chakravarty	UCLA	Superconductivity of fullerenes		
Natural Sciences	Physics	Robert B. Hallock	University of Massachusetts-Amherst	Low-temperature investigation of quantum fluids		
Natural Sciences	Physics	Eric J. Heller	University of Washington	Semiclassical methods applied to atomic and molecular processes		
Natural Sciences	Physics	Paul F. Slattery	University of Rochester	Research at Fermilab		
Natural Sciences	Physics	John P. Wikswo	Vanderbilt University	Magnetic imaging of biological, superconducting, and structural systems		
Natural Sciences	Plant Sciences	Paul G. Falkowski	Brookhaven National Laboratory	Satellite oceanography		
Natural Sciences	Statistics	Simeon M. Berman	New York University	Stochastic models of immunological variables in HIV infection		
Natural Sciences	Statistics	Luke Tierney	University of Minnesota	Methods of extracting statistical data from problems with many unknowns		
Social Sciences	Anthropology & Cultural Studies	Nancy D. Munn	University of Chicago	The ‘Becoming-Past’ of Places: Spacetime and Memory in Nineteenth-Century, Pre-Civil War New York		
Social Sciences	Anthropology & Cultural Studies	Richard Price	Princeton University	Comparative study of anthropological museum displays	With Sally Price	
Social Sciences	Anthropology & Cultural Studies	Sally Price	Princeton University	Comparative study of anthropological museum displays	With Richard Price	
Social Sciences	Anthropology & Cultural Studies	Renato Rosaldo	Stanford University	Cultural citizenship and educational democracy		
Social Sciences	Education	Carol A. Padden	UC San Diego	Early lives of Deaf children		
Social Sciences	Law	James B. White	University of Michigan	Rhetorical constitution of authority		
Social Sciences	Political Science	Robert O. Keohane	Harvard University	U.S. compliance with international commitments, 1783-1990		
Social Sciences	Political Science	John Zaller	UCLA	The role of information in electoral choice		
Social Sciences	Psychology	Judith F. Dunn	Pennsylvania State University	Longitudinal study on childhood		
Social Sciences	Psychology	Edward E. Smith	University of Michigan	The cognitive neuroscience of categorization and reasoning		
Social Sciences	Sociology	Jane Menken	University of Pennsylvania	Fertility and family structure in Bangladesh		
Social Sciences	Sociology	Charles Moskos	Northwestern University	Race relations in the Army and what lessons can be drawn for civilian society		

== 1992 Latin American and Caribbean Fellows ==
Category	Field of Study	Fellow	Institutional association	Research topic	Notes	Ref
Creative Arts	Drama & Performance Art	Diana Raznovich		Playwriting		
Creative Arts	Fiction	Napoleón Baccino Ponce de León		Writing		
Creative Arts	Fiction	Carmen Boullosa		Writing		
Creative Arts	Fiction	Caryl Phillips	Amherst College (visiting)	Writing		
Creative Arts	Fiction	Teresa Porzecanski		Sephardic folklore and Perfumes de Cartago (published 1994)		
Creative Arts	Film	José Carlos Huayhuaca del Pino	Universidad de Lima and Pontificia Universidad Católica del Perú	Filmmaking		
Creative Arts	Fine Arts	Arturo Duclos		Painting and installations		
Creative Arts	Fine Arts	Flavio Garciandía Oraá		Painting		
Creative Arts	Fine Arts	Nari Ward	Brooklyn College	Sculpture		
Creative Arts	Music Composition	Blas Atehortúa		Composing in residence for Waterways Wind Orchestra		
Creative Arts	Photography	Guillermo Hare				
Creative Arts	Poetry	Néstor Osvaldo Perlongher		Writing	Died in 1992	
Humanities	Architecture, Planning, & Design	Silvia Arango de Jaramillo	Universidad Nacional de Colombia	Contemporary challenges in the aesthetics of modern Latin American architecture		
Humanities	Fine Arts Research	Paulo Herkenhoff		Poetics of the Amazon jungle through art		
Humanities	Iberian & Latin American History	Christiana Borchart de Moreno	Centro Andino de Accion Popular	Gender and economy in Quito, 1780-1830		
Humanities	Iberian & Latin American History	Manuel Burga	Fundación Andina	Andean aristocracy, 1680-1780		
Natural Sciences	Astronomy-Astrophysics	Luiz Alberto Nicolaci da Costa	Observatório Nacional	Large-scale structure and peculiar motions in the universe		
Natural Sciences	Neuroscience	Alberto Arregui	Universidad Peruana Cayetano Heredia	Effects of chronic hypoxia on the brain		
Natural Sciences	Mathematics	Jair Koiller	Universidade Federal do Rio de Janeiro	Singularly perturbed Hamiltonian systems		
Natural Sciences	Medicine & Health	Cecilia Hidalgo	Universidad de Chile and Centro de Estudios Científicos	Regulation of calcium release from the intracellular stores in skeletal muscle		
Natural Sciences	Molecular & Cellular Biology	Julio Collado-Vides	Universidad Nacional Autónoma de México	Linguistic theory of the regulation of gene expression		
Natural Sciences	Organismic Biology & Ecology	Ignacio Barradas	Universidad de Guanajuato	Research at Rockefeller University		
Natural Sciences	Physics	Lorenzo Martinez	Universidad Nacional Autónoma de México	Influence of niobium and vanadium on the mechanical properties of microalloyed steels		
Natural Sciences	Physics	Fidel A. Schaposnik	Universidad Nacional de La Plata	2D and 3D field theories and their applications		
Natural Sciences	Plant Sciences	Eduardo R. Fuentes	Universidad Católica de Chile and Universidad de Chile	Evergreen temperate rainforests of Chile		
Social Sciences	Anthropology & Cultural Studies	Victor M. Toledo	Universidad Nacional Autónoma de México	Ethno-ecological analysis of the peasant appropriation of nature		
Social Sciences	Economics	Hildegart Ahumada	Banco Central de la Republica Argentina	Dynamic econometric analysis of money and inflation in Argentina		
Social Sciences	Political Science	Horacio Spector	Universidad de Buenos Aires	Conceptual, legal, and political analysis of communitarianism and Argentine social thought		

== See also ==
- Guggenheim Fellowship
- List of Guggenheim Fellowships awarded in 1991
- List of Guggenheim Fellowships awarded in 1993
