= Wassaic =

Wassaic may refer to:

- Wassaic, New York
  - Wassaic (Metro-North station), a train station in Wassaic, New York
- USS Wassaic (ID-3230), a United States Navy cargo ship in commission from 1918 to 1919
