= Eve Biddle =

American artist

Eve Biddle (born 1982) is a contemporary American artist and co-founder and co-director of the arts organization The Wassaic Project. With her husband, Joshua Frankel, she creates public art murals including Queens is the Future and print art for exhibition. She is also a member of the board at Working Assumptions, a foundation dedicated to the intersection of art and family, best known for its photographic depictions of pregnant women at work.

== Early life ==
Biddle was born and raised on the Lower East Side of Manhattan, the daughter of noted American sculptor Mary Ann Unger and photographer Geoffrey Biddle. She attended Williams College.

== Work ==
In July 2022, Biddle’s work was included in the exhibition “Mary Ann Unger: To Shape a Moon from Bone” at Williams College Museum of Art. The show was reviewed in Frieze, Artforum and Sculpture Magazine.

She was the subject of a two person show with her mom’s work, the artist Mary Ann Unger, in January 2023 at Davidson Gallery.

With her husband, Joshua Frankel, she has created large-scale murals like Queens is the Future and digital art, including "Thanks," a digital billboard visible from Truck Route 9 in Kearny, New Jersey thanking essential workers for their efforts during the COVID-19 pandemic.

The Wassaic Project, of which Biddle is a co-founder and co-director, has been in operation since 2008 in the hamlet of Wassaic within the town of Amenia, New York. Artforum has described the Wassaic Project as a "surprisingly ambitious exhibition and residency complex."
