= Michael North =

Michael North is the name of:

- Michael North (professor), professor of English at UCLA
- Ted North (1916–1975), American actor (sometimes credited as Michael North)
- Mikey North (born 1986), English actor
- Mike North (born 1950s), TV presenter
