= Tara Cooper =

Canadian artist

Tara Cooper is a Canadian multidisciplinary artist based in Toronto, Ontario. She is currently an assistant professor in the Department of Fine Arts at the University of Waterloo and a member of the Loop artist collective.

Cooper received her BFA, BEd from Queen's University, in 1994 and her MFA with a specialization in print media from Cornell University in 2008. Accomplishments include residencies at Anderson Ranch Art Center (Snowmass, Colorado), The Wassaic Project (Wassiac, New York) and Landfall Trust (Brigus, Newfoundland), as well as arts council grants from Ontario and Canada.

Cooper's art practice combines media from print, photography and animation to installation and book arts. Cooper's work has been reviewed by Canadian Art.

Tara Cooper and Jenn Law are co-editors of the 2016 book Printopolis.

Cooper is the co-director of the documentary Follow the Bones (along with Terry O'Neill), a film that tells the story of Northern Alberta's Philip J. Currie Dinosaur Museum.

== Exhibitions ==
- 2019 In Residence: Selections from Haystack's Open Studio Residency, Haystack Mountain School of Crafts, Deer Isle, Maine
- 2018 The Brain is Wider than the Sky, Kitchener Waterloo Art Gallery
- 2018 Reading the Sky (solo), SNAP Gallery, Edmonton, AB
- 2017 God Love Brigus II (solo), Alberta Printmakers, Calgary, AB
- 2016 À la recherche (in search of practice-based research), Open Studio, Toronto
- 2015 Not So Mini, Alberta Printmakers, Calgary, AB
- 2015 Based on a True Story (Part II), ARPRIM, Montreal, QC.
- 2014 Featured Artist Project: SP Weather Reports (2008–2013), The Center for Book Arts, New York City
- 2011 Weather Girl’s Field Guide to Lightning, (solo) Open Studio, Toronto
