= Samuel Martinez =

Cuban-American anthropologist (born 1959)

Samuel Martines (born 1959) is a Cuban-born American ethnologist, ethnographer, cultural anthropologist, and professor at the University of Connecticut. He has published extensively on the struggle for human rights for Haitian immigrants in the Dominican Republic and their Dominican-born offspring. He has also done research on north–south knowledge exchange in human rights and on the rhetoric and visual culture of activism against women rights.

== Early life and education ==
Born in Cuba in 1959, Martinez and his family emigrated in 1961, living first in Colombia and then the United States.

Martinez earned a BS in biological sciences from Stanford University in 1981. He next attended the Johns Hopkins University, where he studied social and cultural anthropology under the mentorship of Sidney Mintz, Richard Price, and Michel-Rolph Trouillot, obtaining a M.A. in 1984 and a PhD in 1992. Martinez is fluent in Spanish and speaks French and Haitian Kreyol.

== Career ==
Since 1997, Martinez has served as a professor of anthropology and Latin American studies at the University of Connecticut. Since 2017, he has been the director of El Instituto: Institute of Latina/o, Caribbean and Latin American Studies. He has chaired the American Anthropological Association's Committee for Human Rights (2003–2004) and was Program Chair of the AAA's Annual Meeting in 2016. He has served on the board of the American Ethnological Society (2010–2014) and in 2013 organized the AES annual meeting in conjunction with the Society for Visual Anthropology.

In 2016, Martinez received the American Anthropological Association's President's Award for outstanding service to the association.

== Research ==
During his doctoral work, Martinez studied the movement of migrant workers from Haiti to sugar plantations in the Dominican Republic. This was done through conducting field work in both a rural peasant community in Haiti and a sugar plantation in the southeastern portion of the Dominican Republic. Through this field work, Martinez found that the circular migration of Haitians to Dominican sugar plantations was both a response to desperate poverty but also a petty accumulation strategy, involving repeated seasonal migration to the Dominican Republic and investment of their savings in the migrants' home places in rural Haiti. As a result of this fieldwork and his subsequent field research experiences, he has become a central figure in a small multi-disciplinary cluster of researchers who study processes that link the two countries within a single island social, cultural and economic unit. One of his most widely cited publications, "Not a Cockfight", appeared in Latin American Perspectives in 2003. In that paper, Martinez raised questions about the excessive pessimism of the "fatal conflict model" of Haitian-Dominican relations, according to which the two nations were destined to fight forever like roosters caught within a single island cage. Scholars of more recent generations have expanded on this reinterpretation by giving careful attention to evidence that bi-national conflict is not inevitable but rather has been stoked by politicians on both sides of the border seeking easy nationalist talking points.

In a paper published in American Anthropologist in 1996, titled "Indifference within Indignation", Martinez explored the issue of modern slavery years before the widespread emergence of conversations surrounding the topics of captive exploitation, human trafficking, and sweatshops.

At the request of Laurel Fletcher, the head of the Berkeley School of Law International Human Rights Law Clinic, Martinez in 2005 contributed an expert affidavit to the Inter-American Court of Human rights, in support of the plaintiffs, Dilcia Yean and Violeta Bosico, who had been denied birth certificates by civil registry officials in the Dominican Republic. The Court ruled that Yean and Bosico were effectively and unjustly being denied birthright citizenship. The similar case of Juliana Deguis Pierre, a Dominican of Haitian ancestry whose citizenship was revoked in 2008, became a topic of widespread international concern after a Dominican high court ruled, in the Sentencia 168 of 2013, to revoke her citizenship and that of tens of thousands of other Dominicans of foreign ancestry. In the years since 2005, Martinez had tracked the official Dominican backlash against the Inter-American Court's Yean and Bosico verdict. He corrected simplifications in the news coverage and media commentary about the Sentencia 168, giving emphasis to the Sentencia's place within a sequence of bureaucratic and legislative moves. In a paper co-authored with scholar/activist Bridget Wooding and published in 2017 in the Mexican journal Migración y Desarrollo ("El antihaitianismo en la República Dominicana ¿un giro biopolítico? [Anti-Haitianism in the Dominican Republic: A Biopolitical Turn?"]), Martinez and Wooding made the case that the new Dominican anti-Haitianism does not aim to expel Haitians and Haitian descendants en masse but rather seeks to confine them more effectively within the lower tier of the country's politics and economics. This paper and other recent chapters of Martinez's work have thus sought to open new dialogues on the role of technology in bureaucratizing anti-Black and anti-immigrant oppression in the Dominican Republic.

== Publications ==
=== Books ===
- 1995 – Peripheral Migrants: Haitians and Dominican Republic Sugar Plantations. Knoxville: The University of Tennessee Press.
- 2007 – Decency and Excess: Global Aspirations and Material Deprivation on a Caribbean Sugar Plantation. Boulder: Paradigm Publishers.

=== Edited volumes ===
- 2009 – International Migration and Human Rights: The Global Repercussions of U.S. Policy. Berkeley: University of California Press, Global, Area, and International Archive, 11.
- 2016 – Interrogating the Perpetrator: Violation, Culpability, and Human Rights. New York: Routledge (with Cathy Schlund-Vials)
