= A Marvelous Order =

Opera

- Opera by Judd Greenstein
- Librettist: Tracy K. Smith
- Language: English
- Website: www.amarvelousorder.com

External media

Audio
- Discussed on WNYC's On The Media
- Discussed on KCRW's Design & Architecture

Video
- Footage from a workshop presentation, 2016

A Marvelous Order is an opera by Judd Greenstein to a libretto by Tracy K. Smith about New York urban activist Jane Jacobs and urban planner Robert Moses. The work was conceived by three artists—Greenstein, Smith and director Joshua Frankel, who also created animation that is projected throughout the opera.

A Marvelous Order was given a work-in-progress "pre-premiere" in March 2016 at the '62 Center for Theater and Dance at Williams College. An excerpt was presented in June 2017 at the Fulton Center in New York City by the River to River Festival. In 2021, excerpts of A Marvelous Order were presented by Brooklyn Public Library in the plaza in front of the Central Library, outdoors, in concert, with animation projected onto the building’s Art Deco facade.

The completed opera had its world premiere on October 20, 2022 at the Center for the Performing Arts at Penn State, in the culmination of a multi-year partnership which included three creative development residencies.

The premiere of A Marvelous Order received a rave review from the Wall Street Journal.

== History ==
From the opera's earliest stages, the mixture of libretto, music, and visuals defined the project. All three of the opera's creators worked in tandem.

== Plot ==
The opera is set in the 1950s and 1960s and centers around the feud between two historical figures: Robert Moses and Jane Jacobs, and their conflicts over Washington Square Park and the neighborhoods around Moses' proposed Lower Manhattan Expressway. Moses' plans include the demolition of Jacobs' home and the surrounding West Village neighborhood to make way for housing towers. In response, Jacobs leads an activist movement, culminating in a riot—exemplifying the conflicts and heightened human emotions that surround decisions about what to build, what to preserve and what to destroy, which impact towns and cities everywhere. The narrative foregrounds questions about urban development and protest, and the influence these forces have on the lives of people, rendered through music, poetry and animation.

== Cast ==
Character	Singer
Jane Jacobs	Megan Schubert
Robert Moses	Rinde Eckert
	Melisa Bonetti
	Kelvin Chan
	Tomás Cruz
	Blythe Gaissert
	Christopher Herbert
	Tesia Kwarteng
	Kamala Sankaram
[Guest appearances]	Dashon Burton, Eric Dudley, Jeffrey Gavet, Avery Griffin, Jonathan Woody
