= 3230 =

3230 may refer to:

- A.D. 3230, a year in the 4th millennium CE
- 3230 BC, a year in the 4th millennium BCE
- 3230, a number in the 3000 (number) range

== Other uses ==
- 3230 Vampilov, an asteroid in the Asteroid Belt, the 3230th asteroid registered
- Nokia 3230, a cellphone
- ALFA-PROJ Model 3230, a handgun
- Kentucky Route 3230, a state highway
- Texas Farm to Market Road 3230, a state highway

== See also ==
- USS Wassaic (ID-3230), a WWI U.S. Navy freighter
