= Geoffrey Biddle =

American photographer

Geoffrey Biddle (born 1950) is an American photographer best known for his depictions of street scenes on the Lower East Side of Manhattan in the 1970s. His photographs have appeared in publications ranging from The NY Times to Granta, in several books, and on exhibit at the Museum of Modern Art and in the collection of the Walker Art Center. His work is included in the permanent collection at MoMA. He is a member of the board at Working Assumptions, a foundation dedicated to the intersection of art and family, best known for its work guiding assignments on the intersection of work and family in high school photography classes and photographic depictions of pregnant women at work. The photography project, Showing, features some of Geoffrey's photographs.

== Biography ==
Geoffrey Biddle was born in 1950 in New York City. He is a member and descendant of the Biddle family. He attended Phillips Exeter Academy, where he graduated in 1968. He graduated from Harvard University in 1972. Biddle married the late sculptor Mary Ann Unger in 1980 and the pair lived on the Lower East Side of Manhattan, where Geoffrey spent a great deal of time photographing the primarily Puerto Rican residents of the neighborhood. The resulting collection of photographs would become the book Alphabet City, which would later be acquired by the New York Public Library.

Biddle and Unger had a daughter, the contemporary American artist Eve Biddle, in 1982. After Unger's death from cancer in 1998, Biddle relocated to California and remarried the journalist Jane Gottesman, with whom he has three daughters.

== Career ==
=== Permanent collections ===
Biddle's photographs appear in permanent collections at MOMA and the New York Public Library.

=== Books ===
Biddle's photographs of the Lower East Side are collected in the book Alphabet City (1992). His photographs depicting a stretch of Ellsworth, Maine, after 9/11 are compiled in God Bless America (2005), which is on display at the 9/11 Museum. His book Sydney and Flora (2009) is a compendium of overlapped portraits. Rock in a Landslide (2023) chronicles Biddle’s relationship with sculptor Mary Ann Unger, their lives as struggling New York artists, the raising of their daughter, Eve, and Unger’s long battle with breast cancer. Eve and Me (2023) is a series of father/daughter self-portraits as they traverse happy times as well as the challenges of Unger’s illness.

Other work is featured in the MOMA catalogue for Pleasures and Terrors of Domestic Comfort and the book Flesh & Blood: Photographers’ Images of Their Own Families (1996). Biddle and Gottesman collaborated on two works of photojournalism, Game Face: What Does a Female Athlete Look Like? (2001) and the installation/series Showing (2012).

=== Teaching ===
Biddle was the Assistant Chairman of the Photography Department at the Parsons School of Design from 1994 to 2001.
