= Mannahatta =

Mannahatta or Manahatta is the Lenape name for Manhattan. It may also refer to:

- Mannahatta (1860 poem), a poem by Walt Whitman
- Manhatta (1921 film), a short film by Charles Sheeler and Paul Strand inspired by Whitman's poem
- Mannahatta (2013 film), an animated film by Joshua Frankel set to Whitman's poem
- Manahatta (2018 play), a play by Mary Kathryn Nagle
- Mannahatta Project, a project by the Wildlife Conservation Society
