= Sally Price (anthropologist) =

American anthropologist

Sally Price, born Sally Hamlin (16 September 1943) in Boston, is an American anthropologist, best known for her studies of so-called "primitive art" and its place in the imaginaire of Western viewers.

== Career ==
Price attended Walnut Hills High School in Cincinnati and then Harvard College, where she majored in French Literature, graduating in 1965 after spending her junior year at the Sorbonne in Paris. In 1963 she married anthropology graduate student Richard Price and together they began conducting fieldwork during summers – in a fishing village in Martinique (1963), in a village in rural Andalusia, Spain (1964), and among Zinacanteco Indians in Chiapas, Mexico (1965 and 1966) as part of a large Harvard-led project in the area. After a brief trip to Suriname to explore the possibility of conducting long-term field research among the Saramaka Maroons of the interior, the Prices returned for a two-year residence in the village of Dangogo, on the Upper Suriname River. This experience formed the foundation of much of their subsequent contribution to the discipline of anthropology and the field of African American studies.

Returning from Suriname, the Prices spent a year in the Netherlands, working with Dutch scholars of Maroon societies such as anthropologist A. J. F. Köbben. It was only later that Sally Price attended graduate school, receiving her Ph.D in Cultural Anthropology from Johns Hopkins University in 1982. Two subsequent years of research in the Netherlands expanded relations with Dutch colleagues, and in 2000 Price was elected foreign member of the Royal Netherlands Academy of Arts and Sciences.

After a dozen years at Johns Hopkins, followed by two years in Paris for a combination of teaching and research, the Prices returned to the fishing village in Martinique where they had begun their careers, establishing it as a base for a series of visiting appointments (at, for example, the University of Minnesota, Stanford University, Princeton University, and the Universidade Federal da Bahia in Brazil). In 1994, Sally Price took on a one-semester-a-year post as Duane A. and Virginia S. Dittman Professor of Anthropology and American Studies at the College of William and Mary, alternating her time between the college and her base in Martinique.

In 2014 she was decorated by France's Ministry of Culture as "Chevalier des Arts et des Lettres" for her "contribution déterminante au rayonnement de la recherche anthropologique et au développement de la réflexion sur les musées de société."

Her website (www.richandsally.net) offers downloadable copies of many of her books and articles.

== Contributions ==
Price's early work, which focused on the Maroons of Suriname, included Co-Wives and Calabashes, "an analysis of the ways that cultural ideas about the genders influence Saramaka women's art and artistic activity and the complementary contributions that these artistic activities make to their social life," which won the University of Michigan's Alice and Edith Hamilton Prize in Women’s Studies. Later, inspired by her experiences as a guest curator of Maroon art for a UCLA-based traveling exhibition, she began exploring Western constructions of non-Western art. Her Primitive Art in Civilized Places(published in English, Dutch, French, German, Italian, Spanish, Portuguese), and Chinese has sparked much debate, "rattling glass cases throughout the art world", as one critic put it. In her role as a Caribbeanist, she co-edited (with Sidney W. Mintz) Caribbean Contours (dubbed “the best single book available today for courses on Caribbean society and politics”) and together with Richard Price, she has written books on a variety of subjects, from artist Romare Bearden's life in the Caribbean to Maroon arts, folktale traditions, public folklore, the history of anthropology, art forgery, and artifact collecting (this last illustrated by Sally Price with 50 pen-and-ink sketches). Her recent work has been based in two distant parts of France--French Guiana, where she continues her ethnographic studies of Maroon culture, and Paris, where she has written on the politics, both personal and national, involved in the creation of Paris's new museum of African, Asian, Oceanic, and Pre-Columbian art.

== Books ==
- 1980: Afro-American Arts of the Suriname Rain Forest (with Richard Price)
- 1984: Co-Wives and Calabashes
- 1985: Caribbean Contours (edited with Sidney W. Mintz)
- 1988: John Gabriel Stedman's Narrative of a Five Years Expedition Against the Revolted Negroes of Surinam (edited with Richard Price)
- 1989: Primitive Art in Civilized Places
- 1991: Two Evenings in Saramaka (with Richard Price)
- 1992: C’est-à-dire (with Jean Jamin)
- 1992: Equatoria (with Richard Price)
- 1992: Stedman's Surinam: Life in an Eighteenth-Century Slave Society (with Richard Price)
- 1994: On The Mall (with Richard Price)
- 1995: Enigma Variations: A Novel (with Richard Price)
- 1999: Maroon Arts: Cultural Vitality in the African Diaspora (with Richard Price)
- 2003: Les Marrons (with Richard Price)
- 2003: The Root of Roots: Or, How Afro-American Anthropology Got Its Start (with Richard Price)
- 2006: Romare Bearden: The Caribbean Dimension (with Richard Price)
- 2007: Paris Primitive: Jacques Chirac's Museum on the Quai Branly
- 2017: Saamaka Dreaming (with Richard Price)
- 2022: Maroons in Guyane: Past, Present, Future (with Richard Price)
