= Camera Works =

2005 work of studies by Michael North

Camera Works: Photography and the Twentieth-Century Word
- Paperback cover
- Author: Michael North
- Language: English
- Genre: Literary and Cultural Studies
- Publisher: Oxford University Press
- Publication date: 2005
- Publication place: United States
- Media type: Print (Paperback)
- Pages: 255
- ISBN: 978-0-19-533293-3
- OCLC: 191752309

Camera Works: Photography and the Twentieth-Century Word is a work of literary and cultural studies by Michael North, a professor of English at UCLA. It is the winner of the 2006 Modernist Studies Association Book Prize.

In Camera Works: Photography and the Twentieth-Century Word, North examines the relationship between literary modernism and new media technologies in the early twentieth century such as photography, advertising, and film. In doing so, North not only makes the case for "a deep and wide modernist interest... in new media of all kinds," but also provides a new way of reading modernism that locates some of its more formally innovative elements within writing's confrontation with the challenges and complications introduced by new media into "the supposed autonomy of the visual and thus into the supposed autonomy of the aesthetic."

Focusing on technologies of mechanical recording and reproduction, which North asserts did nothing less than to reorganize human perception, the author argues that the codification and stylization of the recorded media, which paradoxically served, for example, to distance and aestheticize the world while simultaneously bringing it closer and making it more familiar, are encoded in modernism's heightened awareness of writing's own literariness, which called attention to its status as mediation and thus "complicated the process of representation" by destabilizing the word.

Conceding that any aesthetic movement as complex as modernism must be the result of numerous influences, North proposes that it was this "complicat[ion of] the process of representation," produced in writing's confrontation with new media technologies that both extended human perception and undermined confidence in perception itself, that gave rise to a modernist fascination with experimentation and formal innovation as a means of repairing or renegotiating this separation, what North calls a "far more radical modernity of means."

== Synopsis ==
The study is divided into three major sections. The introduction gives a brief history of the emergence of mechanically recorded media in the middle to late nineteenth century, advances in these technologies in the early twentieth century, and their formal and historical significance for modern writing of the same period. Focusing on photography, which North shows functions as a kind of "modern writing" itself, the author suggests that "perhaps the common beginning of modernism in literature and the arts is to be found in the recording technologies that brought the whole relationship of word, sound, and image into doubt."

Three chapters on little magazines examine in more detail debates on the artistic status of both photography and early silent film, the representational status of the new media in general, and what North terms the "crisis of sound" beginning in 1927 with the introduction of sound technologies into the silent cinema.

Four chapters on individual American authors with a conclusion apply certain concepts within these debates on the new media to particular works of literature both familiar and relatively obscure in order to, as North states, "pose a significant test for the ideas proposed" in his book.

=== Chapter One ===
In Chapter One, North examines debates in Alfred Stieglitz's Camera Work regarding the early artistic status of photography, the influential role of Stieglitz himself in these debates, and a series of critical connections and inconsistencies represented by the magazine toward the new medium of photography through articles contributed by Roland Rood, Sadakichi Hartmann, and Stieglitz himself, among others. One of the more hotly contested questions debated between the contributors to Camera Work was whether photography was even art or documentary, and whether the photographic image itself should be considered realistic or representational. Reprinting photographs published in the magazine, North discusses Pablo Picasso's photography and its impact on the production of his paintings, most specifically in the case of The Reservoir (1909), and Marcel Duchamp's "readymades," which were considered by the artist to be a form of photography, or "snapshot." Finally, North concludes that Stieglitz and his magazine Camera Work only suggested some of the more fundamental questions regarding the new media and its impact on literature, while other magazines would carry out the full implications of those questions in the coming years.

=== Chapter Two ===
Chapter Two focuses on the avant-garde literary magazine transition, its founding editor Eugene Jolas, and early silent cinema in order to show the relationship between international modernism and the movies. 1927, when this magazine began publication, was also the year that sound was introduced into film technology, which North regards as a crisis for the avant-garde. Hostile to sound from the beginning, in fact, many argued with Antonin Artaud that it violated the artistic unity and autonomy of cinema as a purely visual medium. This "crisis of sound," and the anxiety of contamination it represents, played an important role in the aesthetic project of transition, and so North examines the experimental poetry of Jolas published in the magazine, particularly in terms of its "celebrated Revolution of the Word," along with the "reading machines" of Bob Brown in order to locate points where literature and poetry themselves were attempting to achieve a kind of visuality akin to cinema and photography, suggesting that boundaries between "word, sound, and image," and between the old and new media, were not nearly as definitive as some might have wanted to believe.

=== Chapter Three ===
In Chapter Three, North considers Close Up, the European film magazine published in Switzerland "with the more-or-less constant assistance of H.D." from 1927 to 1933. Noting the "considerable convergence of the literary world and the no longer quite so new medium of the movies" by 1927, North furthers his examination of international modernism's struggle with sound by pursuing the introduction of sound technology into silent cinema as a revealing moment in the history of globalization. Hollywood's attempts to cope with "the foreign problem", or that 9/10 of the world's population in 1927 did not speak English, often by shooting films in five different languages, are contrasted with utopian strategies advanced by the avant-garde that attempted to bring about an international film culture of the future based on global multilingualism or even Esperanto. In Chapter Two, North argued that sound came just as critics were raising silent film to the status of art, and here he shows how these two instances of perceived contamination, sound as intruder into the autonomous visuality of film and sound as divisive force in the international medium of the eye, often inflected or contradicted one another in the pages of the magazine. North concludes by stating: "Close Up registers an awareness in modernism of the strangeness opened up within ordinary experience by the new media, which, instead of establishing a new universal language, had exposed the inherent unfamiliarity of languages long in use."

=== Final Section ===
The third and final section of Camera Works extends North's general theoretical framework while applying it directly to several texts by select modernist American writers, examining ways in which F. Scott Fitzgerald's The Great Gatsby and Tender Is the Night, John Dos Passos's U.S.A. trilogy, W.E.B. Dubois's The Souls of Black Folk, James Weldon Johnson's Autobiography of an Ex-Colored Man, and the novels, essays, and unpublished journalism of Ernest Hemingway negotiated visual elements stylistically and as subject of their narratives and, according to North, how these negotiations register a response to writing's confrontation with the new media, their technologies of mechanical recording and reproduction, and, finally, modernism's own crisis of representation.

From Fitzgerald, spectatorship, and the movies to Johnson, lynchings, and the visual production of race, North argues that writers and artists responded to the new media with "mistrust," apprehension, and even a kind of "covert hatred," while simultaneously being inspired and challenged by them.

== Contexts ==
As the winner of the 2006 Modernist Studies Association Book Prize, Michael North's Camera Works is widely recognized as an important contribution to the emergent field of "new modernist studies." Beginning with its seemingly unwieldy premise, that photography, film, and sound technologies of the early twentieth century exposed paradoxes in, while casting doubt on, the authority of representation, mediation, and even perception in both old and new media, that the new, original, and present, for example, could also be standardized, deferred, and endlessly reproduced, and that it was this "complicat[ion of] the process of representation" that inspired modernist experimentation and formal innovation as a means of repairing or renegotiating this break, Camera Works presents "a general theory of the aesthetics of modernity," one that "take[s] very seriously the significant formal innovations provided by material history itself," through its scrupulously detailed account.

Like North's own earlier Reading 1922: A Return to the Scene of the Modern, which might even be regarded as a companion piece to this study, Camera Works shows not only how fully modernism participated in the wider cultural and technological spheres of its day, but also how this participation actually produced much of what scholars consider "modern" about modernism.
