= Joshua Frankel =

American contemporary artist and director

Joshua Frankel (born 1980) is an American contemporary artist and director who makes work in many different media, including animation, film, opera, drawing, printmaking and public art.

Music is often central to Frankel's work. His animation has been presented synchronized to live musical performances by chamber ensembles and full orchestra by institutions including the Library of Congress, the Brooklyn Academy of Music, the San Diego Symphony, and The River to River Festival, where his animation took over 50 video advertising screens in New York City's Fulton Center transit hub at rush hour. Ann Midgette of the Washington Post called his film Plan Of The City “one of the best matches of visuals to music I’ve seen.”

Joshua Frankel's animated collages use modern techniques to represent history, not depicting precisely what happened during specific events but evoking how they felt. New York City, architecture and urban planning are recurring themes in Frankel's work. His use of collage also connects his work to the visual language of architectural proposals.

Frankel was also one of the Superforecasters described in the 2015 book Superforecasting: The Art and Science of Prediction by Philip E. Tetlock and Dan Gardner about the Good Judgment Project, a research project that studied how accurately civilians can forecast future news events.

== Early life ==
Frankel grew up in the Hell's Kitchen neighborhood of Manhattan. He is a graduate of Stuyvesant High School and Williams College.

== Selected works ==
=== A Marvelous Order (2022) ===
A Marvelous Order is an opera about the battle between Robert Moses and Jane Jacobs over the fate of New York City, conceived by Frankel, composer Judd Greenstein and poet Tracy K. Smith. The opera is framed, implicitly, as a love triangle in which Moses and Jacobs vie for the affections of New York City. In addition to being through-composed musically, A Marvelous Order has animation that runs throughout, created by Frankel. Work-in-progress productions were presented at '62 Center for Theater and Dance at Williams College and the River to River Festival. The completed opera had its world premiere on October 20, 2022 at the Center for the Performing Arts at Penn State, in the culmination of a multi-year partnership including three creative development residencies.

=== Emergent System (2020) ===
Emergent System is an animated film by Frankel synchronized to music by composer Missy Mazzoli and featuring choreography by Faye Driscoll, commissioned by Peak Performances at Montclair State University. The film premiered at Peak Performances in 2020 with music performed live on six grand pianos by Grand Band, a piano sextet. In conjunction with the performances, an exhibition of Frankel's drawings was presented in collaboration with the George Segal Gallery.

=== Mannahatta (2013) ===
Mannahatta is an animated film by Frankel, synchronized to music by composer Judd Greenstein and the poem by Walt Whitman of the same name. It premiered at the BAM NextWave Festival in 2013 with music performed by the NOVUS orchestra, Trinity Wall Street Choir and soloist DM Stith.

=== Plan Of The City (2011) ===
Plan Of The City is a film by Frankel that combines animation with live action footage synchronized to music by composer Judd Greenstein performed by NOW Ensemble, a contemporary chamber ensemble. Greenstein and NOW Ensemble also appear in the film. Plan Of The City has been presented with music performed live by NOW Ensemble by institutions including The Library of Congress, the Brooklyn Academy of Music and the New Museum. The work was awarded the Guldbågen by the Lund Architecture Film Festival. Ann Midgette of the Washington Post called the film “one of the best matches of visuals to music I’ve seen,” while New Yorker critic Alex Ross called the work "Gorgeous."

=== Queens Is The Future (2007) ===
Queens Is The Future is a public mural created by Frankel in collaboration with artist Eve Biddle on a handball court in Jackson Heights, Queens. It originally depicted a subway blasting off into space. In 2015, without consulting the original artists, Sony Pictures altered the mural, inserting Spider-Man into the image, to promote the release of the film The Amazing Spider-Man 2.

== Awards ==
- NEA Art Works — Media Arts
- NEA Art Works — Opera
- Graham Foundation Fellowship
- Sundance Institute's New Frontier Story Lab Fellowship
- Jerome Foundation New York City Film & Video Fellowship
- New York State Council on the Arts

== See also ==
- A Marvelous Order
- Queens Is the Future
- Joshua Frankel on KCRW's Design & Architecture
