= Queens is the Future =

Mural by Eve Biddle and Joshua Frankel in New York City

Coordinates: 40°45′18.6″N 73°53′14.8″W

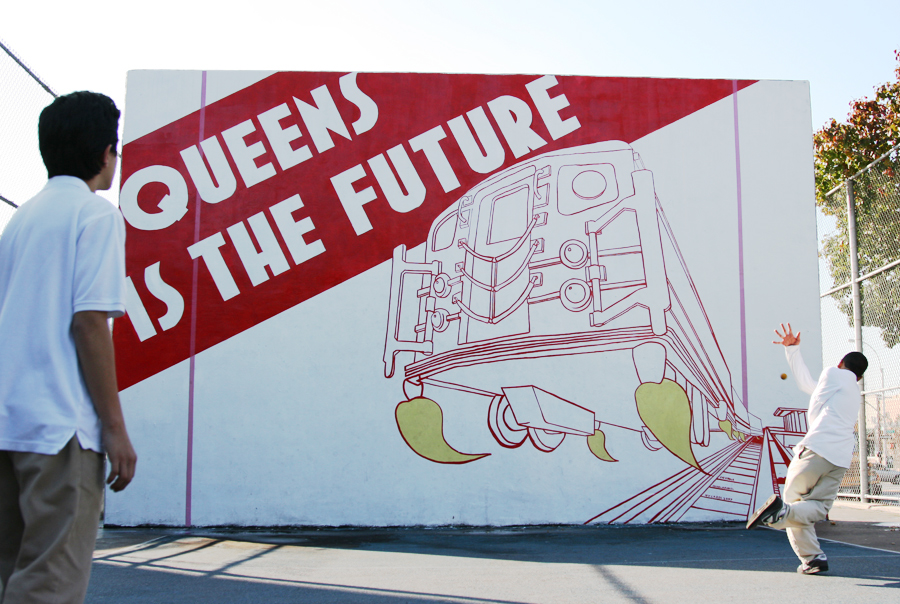
The Queens Is The Future mural in Jackson Heights, Queens, by Eve Biddle and Joshua Frankel. Photo by Joshua Frankel.

Queens is the Future is a mural created in 2007 by married artists Eve Biddle and Joshua Frankel. It is located on a handball court in the schoolyard of I.S. 145, a public middle school in Jackson Heights, Queens. The mural originally depicted a subway car blasting off of its tracks as though powered by rocket fuel, with the words “Queens is the Future” painted in the upper left corner. It quickly became an iconic image of the borough, inspiring the Municipal Art Society to name their walking tour of neighborhood after the work, as well as appearing in Sports Illustrated, Time Out New York, and a short documentary about the rise of Bronx and Queens Rep. Alexandria Ocasio-Cortez.

In January 2015, without consulting the original artists, Sony Pictures altered the mural, inserting Spider-Man into the image, to promote the release of the film The Amazing Spider-Man 2.

The mural was restored in 2022.

In 2026 the mural's text "Queens is the Future" was selected as the new borough slogan, appearing on the “Welcome to Queens” signs at the borough’s borders.

== Inspiration ==
Biddle and Frankel were inspired to create the mural while living in Long Island City, Queens and traveling to Jackson Heights regularly to have lunch with Frankel's mother, a public school teacher there. The elevated 7 train, a subway line, which runs across Roosevelt Avenue and is a distinctive architectural feature of Jackson Heights, was one of the inspirations for the image. Having both grown up in New York City in the 1980s, the artists were influenced by graffiti and other public art they saw as children and young adults including Keith Haring’s iconic Crack is Wack mural, which was also painted on a handball wall.

The phrase “Queens Is The Future” points to Queens’ status as the United States of America's most diverse populous county. Like Queens, America itself is becoming more international, more urban, and less white.

== Queens is the Future details ==
=== Style ===
Queens is the Future incorporates graffiti and comic book graphic style with a minimalist color scheme. The banner reading “Queens is the Future” mimics a style of typography found in early 20th century cruise ship and transportation advertising, which utilized the American Modernist “poster portrait” style typified by artists like Charles DeMuth. The low-angle view of the train also evokes a perspective often found in these ads.

== Desecration ==
In January 2015, without consulting the original artists, Sony Pictures altered the mural, inserting Spider-Man into the image, to promote the release of the film The Amazing Spider-Man 2.

In the altered mural, Spider-Man lifts the subway car off the tracks “rescuing” children who've been inserted into the train's windows, a contrast to the original message of the work. The alterations also included the addition of the geographically inaccurate image of the Statue of Liberty, which is not visible from Jackson Heights. The mural was selected by Sony because the character is from Forest Hills, Queens. NYC Service, a city agency, introduced Sony to I.S. 145. The alterations were executed by artist Ibrahim Wann. Actor Andrew Garfield and other cast members appeared at an unveiling of the altered mural at the school, which was attended by students and other neighborhood residents.

Biddle and Frankel understood the students' excitement around this event, but Frankel expressed his disappointment in the mural's repurposing: “They took a work of public art in the community and turned it into an advertisement for the film, and called it community service.”

The mural fell into disrepair soon after it was altered.

== Restoration ==
In 2021, the mural's original design was printed on t-shirts for the Jackson Heights Mile—a one mile run organized by Queens Distance Runners, a local running club, to benefit families displaced by the 8-alarm 89th Street fire which blazed that spring.

In 2022, building on that momentum, the mural was restored, with support from Angelo Baque, Awake NY, Project Queens, NY State Assemblymember Jessica Gonzalez-Rojas, NY State Senator Jessica Ramos, Queens Borough President Donovan Richards, Jackson Heights Beautification Group, Principal Rodriguez and IS 145, and other members of the Jackson Heights community.

The restoration project included the creation of a new community-sourced mural on the reverse side of the wall led by Jackson Heights-based artist, Erick Teran.

The restoration project began with extensive research into materials and methodology so that the restored mural would be able to withstand sun, rain, snow, graffiti, and impacts from regular handball play. Biddle and Frankel visited handball courts with artwork on them across New York City and spoke with the team that restored Keith Haring’s ‘Crack is Wack’ mural, also on a handball court. The materials ultimately selected for the work include primer designed specifically to integrate with concrete, paints used on the hulls of cruise ships, and sealants used on oil rigs.

== Legacy ==
The original mural inspired the Municipal Art Society to name their walking tour “Queens is the Future.” A photograph of the mural appears prominently in a 2015 print edition issue of Time Out New York celebrating Queens as “New York’s hottest borough.” The work also appears in Seth Fein's 2017 experimental documentary film Between Neighborhoods. It is featured in a 2019 mini-documentary about Rep. Alexandria Ocasio-Cortez, who represents Queens and the Bronx, entitled “Before Alexandria Was Known As AOC, There Was A Movement That Recruited Her To Run.” New York State Senator Jessica Ramos, who represents Jackson Heights, featured a photograph of herself standing in front of the mural prominently on her website. A recent book, All the Queens Houses, by Rafael Herrin-Ferri, included an introductory essay by Joseph Heathcott which was named after the mural and uses it as a jump-off point for its discussion of the borough.

In 2026, Queens Borough President Donovan Richards selected “Queens is the Future” as the new borough slogan, inspired by the mural. The New York City Department of Transportation added the slogan to the nine “Welcome to Queens” road signs installed at the borough’s borders along major highways and bridges. The signs were updated as part of the transition to the administration of Zohran Mamdani, the first Queens resident to become Mayor of New York City. The adoption of the phrase on the borough’s highway signage brought the mural’s message of Queens as a place of diversity and possibility into a broader public context. It also represents a rare instance of text from street art making a sanctioned leap onto official government signage.
