= Whitney Davis =

American art historian

- Born: April 15, 1958 (age 68)
- Education: Harvard College; Harvard University
- Occupations: Art historian, author
- Title: Professor of History and Theory of Ancient and Modern Art
- Awards: NOMIS Distinguished Scientist and Scholar Award (2024)

Academic work
- Discipline: History
- Sub-discipline: Art History
- Institutions: UC Berkeley

Whitney Davis (born April 15, 1958) is an art historian, writer, and theorist. Between 2001 and 2023, he was Professor of History and Theory of Ancient and Modern Art in the Department of History of Art at the University of California, Berkeley, where he, in 2010, assumed the George C. and Helen N. Pardee Chair, a position previously held by T. J. Clark, and, in 2023, became Distinguished Professor Emeritus and Professor in the Graduate School.

As a recipient of the 2024 NOMIS Distinguished Scientist and Scholar Award, Davis is currently directing "Depictured Worlds: The Perceptual Power of Pictures", a multi-year project that probes the impact of picture perception on our experience of the world beyond.

== Career ==
=== Early academic career ===
Whitney Davis attended Harvard College, earning an A.B. degree in 1980, later attending Harvard University to earn an A.M. in 1982 and Ph.D. in 1985. During this time, Davis held a position as a Junior Fellow in the Society of Fellows at Harvard from 1983 to 1986, and wrote a dissertation titled The Canonical Tradition in Ancient Egyptian Art.

=== Early teaching career ===
Prior to holding a teaching position at the University of California, Berkeley, Davis taught at Northwestern University from 1987 to 2001. During this time, Davis served as the director of the Alice Berline Kaplan Center for the Humanities from 1995 to 1998, and as the John Evans Professor of Art History from 1998 to 2001.
