= Romey Stuckart =

American painter (1955–2020)

- Born: August 29, 1955; Sublimity, Oregon, U.S.
- Died: November 24, 2020 (aged 65)
- Education: Gonzaga University; University of Iowa
- Occupation: Painter
- Spouse: Stephen Schultz (m. 1984; died 2020)
- Awards: Guggenheim Fellow (1992)

Romey Stuckart (August 29, 1955 – November 24, 2020) was an American painter. A Guggenheim Fellow, she painted expressionist landscapes of the forests of her resident state Idaho and exhibited at the Boise Art Museum, the Utah Museum of Contemporary Art, and the Northwest Museum of Arts and Culture.

== Biography ==
Rosemary Stuckart was born on August 29, 1955, in Sublimity, Oregon, She was the fifth of the six children of Cecilia Ann (née Smith) and Robert Stuckart, the latter of whom ran a sawmill where all of their children, including Rosemary herself, worked at. After graduating from a Catholic school, she received her BA at Gonzaga University, during which she spent a year studying abroad as part of their Gonzaga-in-Florence program, and both her MA and MFA at the University of Iowa (UI). After working as a visiting teacher at Simpson College (1982) and the Bellagio Center (1984), and as an Adjunct Instructor in Drawing and Painting at UI, she worked there as Adjunct Assistant Professor from 1985 to 1988. She was a Millay Colony for the Arts fellow in 1983, a Virginia Center for the Creative Arts fellow (1984), and Iberê Camargo Foundation fellow (1985).

She worked on landscape paintings, focusing on the forests of Idaho, starting with "the wilderness around the towns of Hope and Sandpoint". Later, she later began painting art "concerned with energy and the natural world". She also painted alongside her husband during their vacations abroad. The Missoula Art Museum described her style as "unconventional" and "abstract expressionist". She said in a 2002 interview with The Spokesman-Review: "My process involves a listening inward, a dance of faith and anxiety coaxing into view this visual reference for what we almost know." In addition to painting, she also did drawing and self-portraits and practiced healing techniques.

In 1992, she exhibited during the 7th Idaho Biennial at the Boise Art Museum. In 2003, she had a solo exhibition titled "Romey Stuckart: Paintings" at Salt Lake Art Center (now the Utah Museum of Contemporary Art). Another solo exhibition of her paintings, "Energy, Change, Movement", was held at the Northwest Museum of Arts and Culture in 2007. In addition to the rest of the Intermountain West and the Pacific Northwest, she also exhibited in New York City and in Germany.

She was awarded a Guggenheim Fellowship in 1992. She was awarded a 1993 National Endowment for the Arts Visual Artists' Fellowship in painting for $20,000, "in spite of being under 40, female and from the West".

In 1984, she married Stephen Schultz, whom she met as a student at UI where Schultz worked as a professor; The two were both artists and started their own art studios in Hope, Idaho, where they lived from 1987 until her death.

Stuckart died on November 24, 2020 of brain cancer. From February to June 2022, the Missoula Art Museum held Romey Stuckart: Within And Without, an exhibition of her works in her memory which was in development at the time of her death.
