= The Wassaic Project =

Arts organization in Wassaic, New York, United States

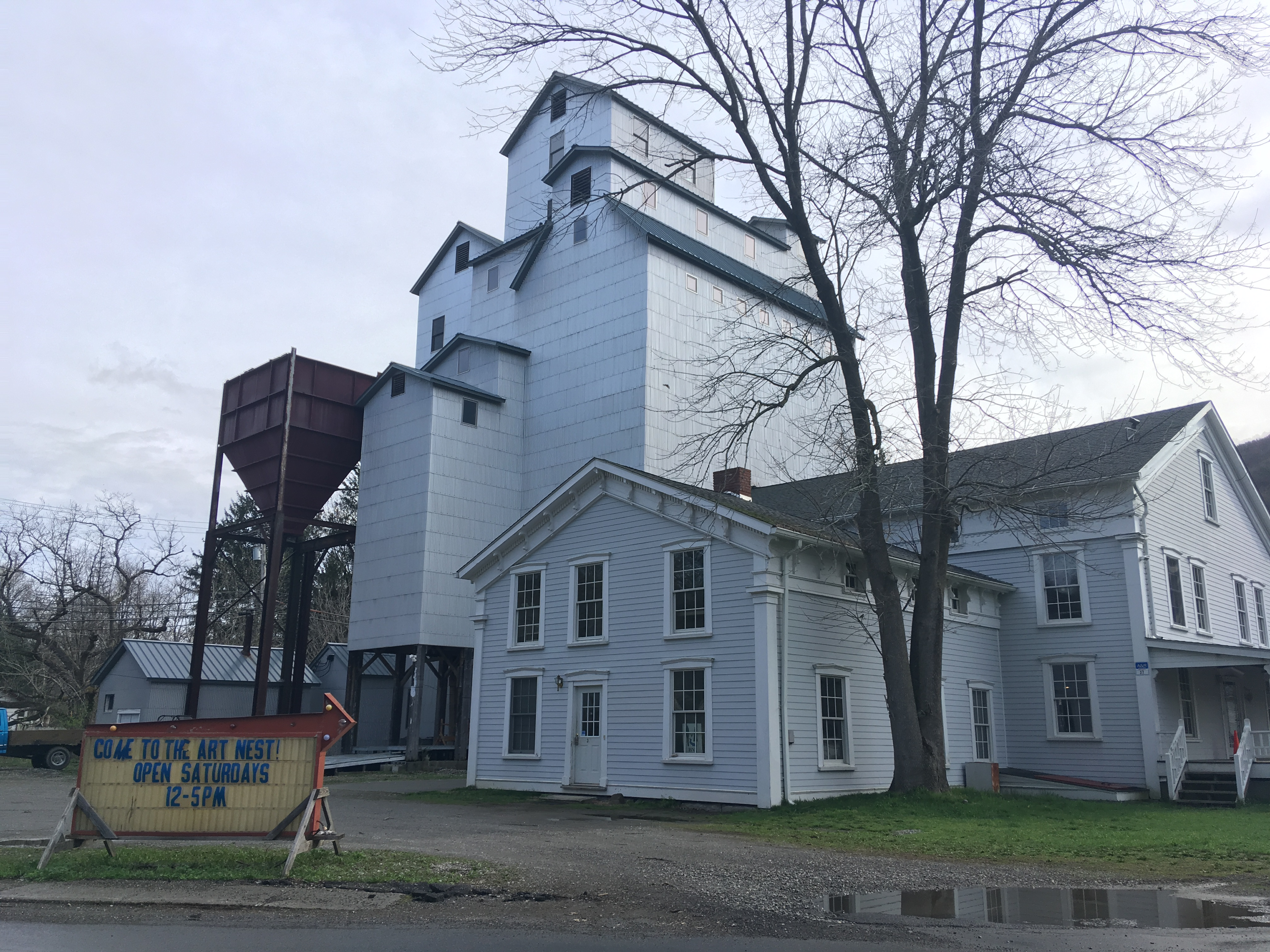
- Formation: 2008
- Type: Arts Organization
- Headquarters: Wassaic, New York
- Region served: United States
- co-directors: Bowie Zunino, Eve Biddle, Jeff Barnett-Winsby
- Website: www.wassaicproject.org

The Wassaic Project is a non-profit artist-run arts, community and art education space in Wassaic, New York founded in 2008 that curates exhibitions, produces community events and hosts artist residencies. Currently it consists of a year-round competitive residency program and year round arts programming.

== History ==
Co-Founders Bowie Zunino and Eve Biddle reconnected several years after graduating from Williams College. They shared an interest in creating a free arts festival and decided to collaborate on producing one. Eve had curated shows with (Co-Founder) Elan Bogarin and Elan expressed interest in becoming a partner. The first festival was held the summer of 2008 in Wassaic NY at Maxon Mills the former grain elevator that Zunino's father and his partner Richard Berry had recently finished restoring. Jeff Barnett-Winsby joined the next spring and co produced the 2009 Festival. Immediately following the 2009 Festival, Barnett-Winsby and Zunino moved full time to Wassaic and worked through the winter to renovate the old Luther Barn and build studios. Biddle, Zunino, Bogarin, and Barnett-Winsby founded the artist residency in the spring of 2010.

== The project ==
The organization makes use of restored historic buildings in the hamlet of Wassaic, including Maxon Mills and Luther Barn. Maxon Mills, a seven-story former wood crib grain elevator, has been converted into exhibition, office, and studio spaces, including Art NEST, a free drop-in creative space for kids. Luther Barn is home to artist-in-residence studios and the old cattle auction ring is used as a film exhibition space during the summer festival. The organization currently offers year-round programming as well as an education program focused onsite and at the Webutuck consolidated school district serving the Towns of Amenia and Northeast.

The Wassaic Project hosts an annual Summer Festival, outdoors and in their Mill building. Their Mill building has an exhibition space open to the public that has shown work by Colin Williams, Margeaux Walter, Minhee Bae, Tatiana Arocha, Eleanor Sabin, Ghost of a Dream and Doug and Mike Starn. And their artist in residence program alumni include Sean Fader, Manuel H. Márquez, Hillerbrand + Magsamen, Hunter Creel, Goldie Poblador, and Eliza Swann. The project hosts other community events that bring thousands of visitors like their August Festival for dance performances, their annual haunted house and overnight bonfires.

The Wassaic Project also has an invitational print Editions Program where they pair a contemporary artist with a master printer to produce an edition in their studio. Artists in this program have included William Powhida, Lisa Iglesias, Kenya (Robinson) and Amanda Valdez among many.

== Artists residency ==
There are summer residencies from May to October with studios in the Luther Barn, a historic livestock barn built in 1875. The winter residencies are January to April with studios in Maxon Mills, a historic grain mill. There is 24-hour access to the studios. Facilities include a print shop, wood shop, and ceramics studio. All residents live just a short walk away in one of our three residency houses, the Schoolhouse, the Lodge, or the HVA.
