= Richard Price (American anthropologist) =

American anthropologist and historian (born 1941)

Richard Price (born November 30, 1941, in New York City) is an American anthropologist and historian, best known for his studies of the Caribbean and his experiments with writing ethnography.

== Career ==
Price grew up in the Riverdale section of the Bronx and attended the Fieldston School. He received both Bachelors and Ph.D. degrees from Harvard University (1963, 1970), having conducted fieldwork in Peru, and then with Sally Price in Martinique, Mexico, Spain, and for two years among the Saramaka Maroons of Suriname. A year studying with Claude Lévi-Strauss in Paris and another in Amsterdam working with Dutch scholars of Maroons preceded his five years of teaching in the Department of Anthropology at Yale University. In 1974, he moved to Johns Hopkins University to found the Department of Anthropology, where he served three terms as chair, before leaving in 1986 for two years of teaching in Paris. A decade of freelance teaching (University of Minnesota, Stanford University, Princeton University, University of Florida, Universidade Federal da Bahia), while based in Martinique, ended with an appointment as Duane A. and Virginia S. Dittman Professor of American Studies, Anthropology, and History at the College of William and Mary. He has continued fieldwork with Maroons, notably in French Guiana and Suriname, as well as with his Martiniquan neighbors, into the present. Since the 1990s, he has worked with Saramaka Maroons in defense of their human rights, twice testifying as expert witness on behalf of the Saramakas in cases that they eventually won before the Inter-American Court for Human Rights in Costa Rica.

== Contributions ==
Price's early contributions, influenced by his teachers Clyde Kluckhohn, Evon Z. Vogt, and Sidney W. Mintz, included the first conceptualization of Maroon (runaway slave) communities throughout the Americas in a comparative framework. His demonstration that people previously considered largely “without history,” such as Saramaka Maroons (the descendants of runaway slaves), in fact possessed rich and deep historical consciousness has influenced historians as well as anthropologists. For this work in what he calls “ethnographic history,” Price's books have won numerous awards: First-Time won the Elsie Clews Parsons Prize of the American Folklore Society and Alabi’s World won the Albert J. Beveridge Award of the American Historical Association, the Gordon K. Lewis Award of the Caribbean Studies Association, and the School of American Research's prestigious J. I. Staley Prize. An essay originally written in 1973 with Sidney Mintz, The Birth of African-American Culture, has had considerable influence on Afro-Americanist historians and anthropologists, sometimes inciting strong controversy about the extent to which enslaved Africans and their descendants “retained” aspects of their home cultures and societies and the extent to which they created new cultural and social forms in the Americas. Price's Travels with Tooy, an ethnography of the imaginaire of a Saramaka healer, attempts to transcend this dichotomy by demonstrating that historical processes of creolization involved people making creative uses of their varied, specific African heritages in the process of nation-building in the New World. In 2008, Travels with Tooy won the Victor Turner Prize in Ethnographic Writing, and in 2009, the Gordon K. and Sybil Lewis Award for Caribbean Scholarship and the Clifford Geertz Prize in the Anthropology of Religion. Price's Rainforest Warriors tells the story of the Saramaka struggle to protect their territory against the encroachments of the State of Suriname. In 2012, the book won the Best Book Prize of the American Political Science Association in the field of human rights and the Senior Book Prize of the American Ethnological Society.

Several of Price's books have been written with anthropologist and art critic Sally Price, including a critical edition of the famous eighteenth-century narrative of John Gabriel Stedman and an exploration of the Caribbean paintings of African American artist Romare Bearden. Since the 1980s, he has frequently experimented with new forms of writing culture, including experiments with typesetting and page layout and authoring books that are in part memoirs (or highly reflexive anthropology) and, in one case, an anthropological novel. Despite the label of postmodern sometimes applied to his work, he prefers to consider himself an ethnographic historian. Most of Price's books continue to draw on his continuing ethnography with Suriname Maroons, but one innovative work, The Convict and The Colonel, centers on his four-decades-long relationship with Martinique, where he and Sally Price live for most of each year. And in 2022, he published Inside/Outside: Adventures in Caribbean History and Anthropology, a memoir about his life as a historian and anthropologist. His books have been translated into French, Spanish, Dutch, German, Portuguese, Chinese, and Saramaccan.

In 2014, at a ceremony in Havana, he received the prestigious Premio Internacional Fernando Ortiz (“El Premio Internacional Fernando Ortiz es el más alto reconocimiento otorgado por la Fundación homónima por la actividad de toda una vida”], and the same year in France, he was decorated by France's Minister of Culture as "Chevalier des Arts et des Lettres" for his "contribution déterminante au rayonnement de la recherche anthropologique."

== Books ==
- 1973. Maroon Societies: Rebel Slave Communities in the Americas (edited and with an introduction by Richard Price)
- 1975. Saramaka Social Structure: Analysis of a Maroon Society in Surinam
- 1976. The Guiana Maroons: A Historical and Bibliographical Introduction
- 1980. Afro-American Arts of the Suriname Rain Forest (with Sally Price)
- 1983. First-Time: The Historical Vision of an Afro-American People
- 1983. To Slay the Hydra: Dutch Colonial Perspectives on the Saramaka Wars
- 1988. John Gabriel Stedman's Narrative of a Five Years Expedition Against the Revolted Negroes of Surinam (Newly Transcribed from the Original 1790 Manuscript, Edited, and with an Introduction and Notes, by Richard and Sally Price)
- 1990. Alabi's World
- 1991. Two Evenings in Saramaka (with Sally Price)
- 1992. Stedman's Surinam: Life in an Eighteenth-Century Slave Society (with Sally Price)
- 1992. The Birth of African-American Culture (with Sidney W. Mintz)
- 1992. Equatoria (with Sally Price)
- 1994. On the Mall (with Sally Price)
- 1995. Enigma Variations (with Sally Price)
- 1998. The Convict and The Colonel
- 1999. Maroon Arts: Cultural Vitality in the African Diaspora (with Sally Price)
- 2003. Les Marrons (with Sally Price)
- 2003. The Root of Roots: Or, How Afro-American Anthropology Got Its Start (with Sally Price)
- 2006. Romare Bearden: The Caribbean Dimension (with Sally Price)
- 2008. Travels with Tooy: History, Memory, and the African American Imagination
- 2010. Rainforest Warriors: Human Rights on Trial. University of Pennsylvania Press. ISBN 978-0-8122-4300-0.
- 2013. Fesiten
- 2017. Saamaka Dreaming (with Sally Price)
- 2022. Maroons in Guyane: Past, Present, Future (with Sally Price)
- 2022. Inside/Outside: Adventures in Caribbean History and Anthropology
