= Jacqueline Hayden =

American feminist artist (born 1950)

- Born: 1950; Cincinnati, Ohio
- Education: Yale
- Known for: Photography, video
- Movement: Feminist art
- Website: jacquelinehayden.net

Jacqueline Hayden (born 1950) is an American feminist artist and professor emerita of film and photography at Hampshire College in Amherst, Massachusetts.

== Biography ==
In the 1980s, Hayden created a Sightings Natural History Series, in which "she has traveled to the four corners of the zoo, and to the very ends of the natural history museum" according to a review by Pamela Kessler in The Washington Post. In a review of work from her Dislocation/Relocation series, Jo Ann Lewis writes for The Washington Post that Hayden "composes her layered color photographs within the camera, often reusing the same film in two different cameras, one to establish background, another for foreground. With luck-and chance plays a big part-the resulting double exposures relate in some superficial way, as in one image of Eskimo masks superimposed upon a scene of masked Holloween revelers in Georgetown."

Hayden's later work focuses primarily on the theme of women's bodies as the site for larger cultural discourse. The five series highlighted on her website, Celestial Bodies (2011–ongoing), Passing Away (2010–2013), Voluminous (2003–2006), Ancient Statuary Series (1996–2000), and Figure Model Series (1991–1996) all photograph women with typically marginalized body types—i.e. the aging female body, or overweight women. In 2000 profile of Hayden for The Chronicle of Higher Education, Zoe Ingalls writes, "her goal is to challenge preconceived notions of beauty and, in the process, combat stereotypes about old people and the aging process." In a 2018 review of a group exhibition, Maura Reilly of ARTnews writes, "Hayden's images of heavyset elderly women in the nude pointed up the obsession with beauty and youth."

Since 1991, Hayden has been a professor emerita of Film and Photography at Hampshire College in Amherst, Massachusetts. Hayden works with Hampshire College's Study abroad program in Havana, Cuba, where she has worked to create a historical archive of the old city.

== Awards ==
- John Simon Guggenheim Fellowship
- National Endowment for the Arts Individual Artist Fellowship
