= SS Wassaic =

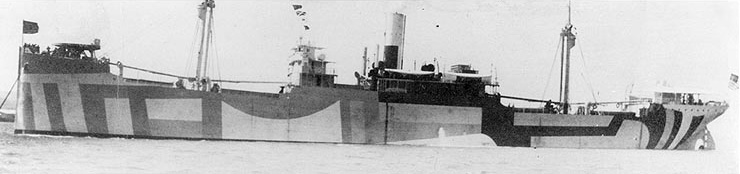
- SS Wassaic with dazzle camouflage, probably just after completion in mid-1918 and just prior to her U.S. Navy service as USS Wassaic (ID-3230)

History

United States
- Name: Wassaic
- Namesake: Wassaic
- Owner: USSB
- Builder: Los Angeles Shipbuilding & Dry Dock Co., San Pedro
- Yard number: 4
- Laid down: 30 August 1917
- Launched: 14 April 1918
- Commissioned: 25 July 1918
- Maiden voyage: 10 November 1918
- Home port: Los Angeles
- Identification: US Official Number 216598; Code letters LMFH
- Fate: Scrapped, 1931

History

United States
- Name: USS Wassaic
- Operator: U.S. Navy (1918–1919)
- Commissioned: 14 October 1918
- Decommissioned: 29 May 1919
- Fate: Returned to owners 29 May 1919

General characteristics
- Type: Design 1013 cargo ship
- Tonnage: 5,529 GRT; 3,387 NRT; 8,415 DWT
- Displacement: 12,186 tons (normal)
- Length: 410.0 ft (125.0 m)
- Beam: 54.4 ft (16.6 m)
- Draft: 23 ft 11 3/8 in (7.299 m) (loaded)
- Depth: 27.2 ft (8.3 m)
- Installed power: 670 Nhp, 2,500 ihp
- Propulsion: Westinghouse Electric Co. steam turbine, double reduction geared to one screw
- Speed: 11 1/2 knots (13.2 mph; 21.3 km/h)
- Complement: 60
- Armament: During WWI; 1 × 5 in (127 mm) naval gun; 1 × 3 in (76 mm) naval gun

Wassaic was a steam cargo ship built in 1918–1919 by Los Angeles Shipbuilding & Dry Dock Company of San Pedro for the United States Shipping Board (USSB) as part of the wartime shipbuilding program of the Emergency Fleet Corporation (EFC) to restore the nation's Merchant Marine.

SS Wassaic was a steel-hulled, single-screw freighter built under a United States Shipping Board contract. She was launched on 14 April 1918 by the Los Angeles Shipbuilding and Drydock Company at San Pedro, Los Angeles, California. Subsequently, taken over by the U.S. Navy for World War I use by the Naval Overseas Transportation Service (NOTS) and given Identification Number (Id. No.) 3230, she was commissioned at New Orleans, Louisiana, as USS Wassaic (ID-3230) on 14 October 1918.

Wassaic loaded 7,468 tons of United States Army supplies and got underway for Bordeaux, France, on 10 November 1918, the day before the armistice with Germany was signed, ending World War I. En route to Europe, Wassaic encountered mechanical difficulties and was obliged to put into New York City on 16 November 1918 for repairs. Underway again on 29 November 1918, Wassaic, rerouted in light of the war's end, sailed for Brest, France, instead of Bordeaux.

Arriving at Brest on 13 December 1918, Wassaic got underway for the United States on 31 December 1918. After a stop at Corona, Spain, for repairs to her damaged propeller, Wassaic got underway from Corona on 6 January 1919. Following stops at the Azores and Bermuda, she made port at Newport News, Virginia, on 7 February 1919.

Wassaic took on a cargo of railroad supplies and departed the United States East Coast on her second NOTS voyage on 10 March 1919, bound for La Pallice, France. Arriving there on 23 March 1919, she discharged her cargo and returned to the United States, heavily ballasted partly with a cargo of steel rails. Putting briefly into Norfolk, Virginia, on 22 April 1919, Wassaic sailed for New Orleans on 23 April 1919, arriving there on 29 April 1919. Discharging her cargo of steel there, she shifted to New York. There, after final repairs and inventories, Wassaic was decommissioned, struck from the Navy List, and returned to the United States Shipping Board, all on 29 May 1919.

Wassaic remained in Shipping Board ownership until she was abandoned due to age and deterioration in 1931 or 1932.
