= Ryan Weideman =

American photographer and printmaker

Ryan Weideman (born 1941) is an American photographer, living in New York City, who photographed his passengers while working as a taxi driver there between 1981 and 2016. He produced a book of his photographs, In My Taxi: New York After Hours (1991). He also makes lithographic print-based art.

Weideman's photographic and lithographic prints are held in the collections of the Brooklyn Museum, Art Institute of Chicago, Harry Ransom Center, Museum of Fine Arts, Houston and Portland Art Museum. In 1992 he received a Guggenheim Fellowship for his photography.

== Early life and education ==
Weideman grew up in the Midwestern United States. In 1973, he earned a BA in photography and printmaking from Long Beach State University at Long Beach, California. In 1975, he earned a MFA in the same subjects from California College of the Arts in Oakland, California. As of 1978 he was living in Oakland.

== Life and work ==
In 1980, Weideman moved to New York City, living in an apartment in Times Square. From 1981, he took a job as a taxi driver and from that vantage photographed his passengers, while working from 5pm to 5am three or four nights a week. The rest of his time was spent developing film and making black and white prints. After the first six or seven years he included himself in the photographs. A book of this work, described in The Independent as "democratic, slice-of-life reportage", was published in 1991 titled In My Taxi: New York After Hours. Weideman stopped driving cabs in 2016 and as of 2018 was still living in the same apartment in Times Square.

He also makes lithographic print-based art.

== Publications ==
- In My Taxi: New York After Hours. Thunder's Mouth, 1991. ISBN 978-1560250241.

== Awards ==
- 1984/85: National Endowment for the Arts Fellowship Grant for photography
- 1986/87: New York Foundation for the Arts Fellowship, for photography
- 1992: Guggenheim Fellowship from the John Simon Guggenheim Memorial Foundation for photography

== Collections ==
Weideman's work is held in the following permanent collections:

- Brooklyn Museum, Brooklyn, NY: 1 photographic print (as of 27 February 2023)
- Art Institute of Chicago, Chicago, IL: 1 lighographic print (as of 27 February 2023)
- Harry Ransom Center, University of Texas at Austin: 3 photographic prints (as of 27 February 2023)
- Museum of Fine Arts, Houston, TX: 2 photographic prints (as of 27 February 2023)
- Portland Art Museum, Portland, OR: 21 photographic and lighographic prints (as of 27 February 2023)
