= Erik Levine =

Artist

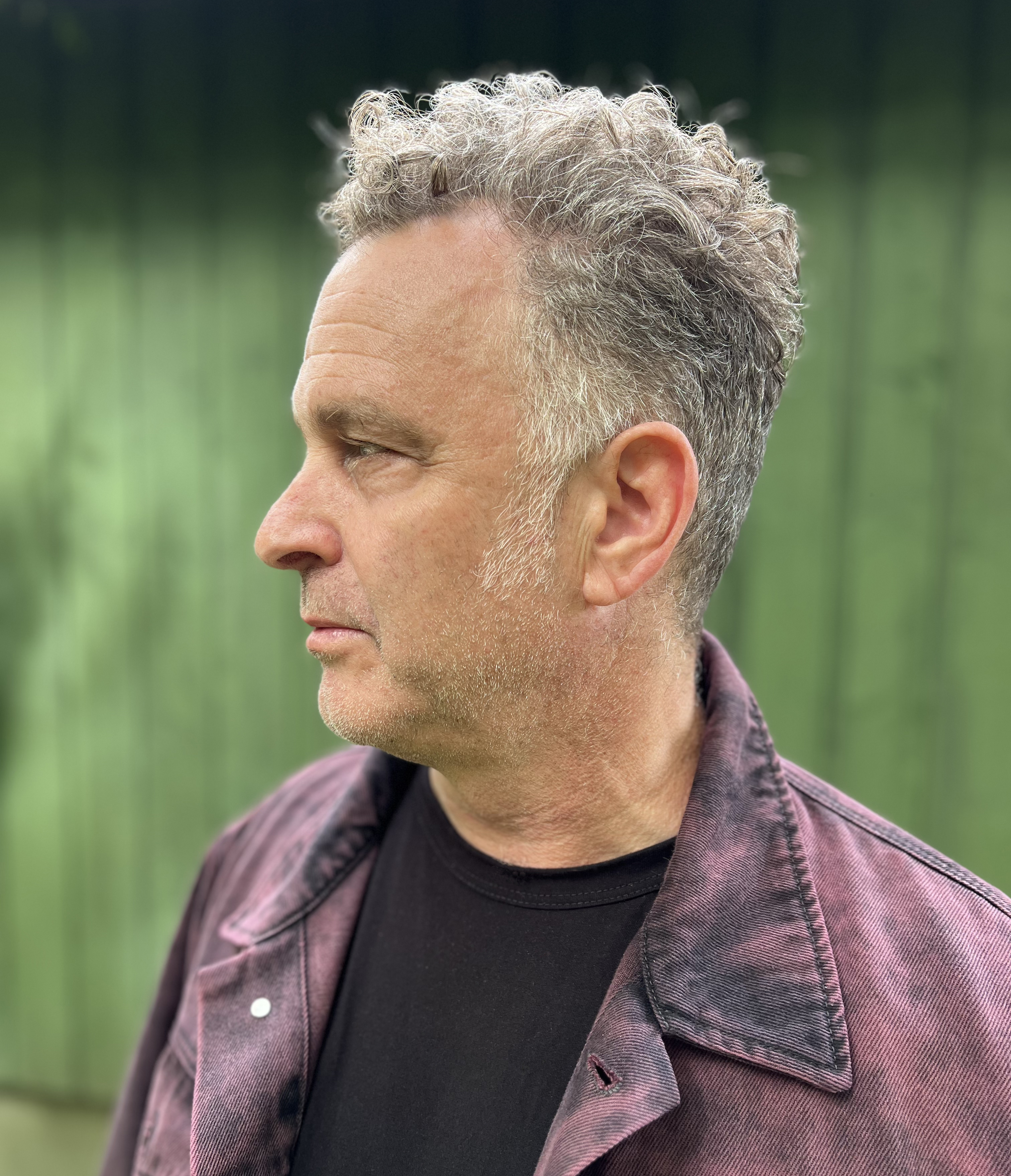
- Known for: Videos, sculptures, and drawings
- Notable work: Round House, The Walker Art Center (1990)
- Awards: Guggenheim Fellowship(1992); Awards in the Visual Arts (1988); National Endowment for the Arts (1989)
- Website: http://www.eriklevine.com/index.html

Erik Levine is an American visual artist. He is a Professor of Art in the College of Liberal Arts at the University of Massachusetts Boston.

Levine is most known for his videos, sculptures, and drawings, with his works featured in the public collections of museums, such as the Whitney Museum of American Art, the Walker Art Center, and the Hirshhorn Museum and Sculpture Garden.

== Early life and career ==
Levine was born in 1960 and grew up in Los Angeles, California. He pursued his undergraduate studies at California State University Northridge and University of California Los Angeles. He then returned to college later and received his BA from Thomas Edison State College. He has been serving as the Professor of Art in the College of Liberal Arts at the University of Massachusetts Boston since 2005.

== Works ==
Levine's work spans various mediums, encompassing video, sculpture, and drawings and are held in public collections, including the Walker Art Center, Des Moines Art Center, Hirshhorn Museum and Sculpture Garden, Museum of Contemporary Art in Los Angeles, and the Whitney Museum of American Art, among others. His sculptures, which were shown at the Diane Brown Gallery in 1988, blended Minimalist and Post-Minimalist influences, showcasing organic geometries crafted from thin-skinned wood. Furthermore, his artwork Apparatus, displayed in an exhibition at Ruth Bloom Gallery in Los Angeles, California in 1998 blended industrial plastic foam scaffolding with organic polyurethane forms, creating a contrast between rigidity and organic fluidity, symbolizing the inherent contradictions in reliance on disposable man-made materials. His video work displayed in a 2017 exhibition Dying well—False death conveyed an exploration of the nature of death, delving into themes of fascination, fear, and changing perceptions of mortality.

Much of Levine's recent work features video installations, which include Grip in 2005, coyoteNorth in 2013, Scenario in 2018 and The Guilty Sleep in 2022. His 2016 work titled Still Lifes explored the impact of aging by showcasing the lives of elderly individuals in retirement homes and assisted living facilities, using their experiences to symbolize the passage of time and life journeys.

Throughout his career, Levine has been a recipient of several awards, including a Guggenheim Fellowship and three Pollock-Krasner Foundation awards, as well as having been a resident at the Robert Rauschenberg Residency. He has received support and grants from the New York Foundation for the Arts, the New York State Council on the Arts, the Massachusetts Cultural Council, and the National Endowment for the Arts.

== Reception ==
Cathy Curtis, writing for the Los Angeles Times while examining his work Apparatus, in an exhibition at the Newport Harbor Art Museum said "Erik Levine's huge Apparatus, is a promised gift to the museum, sets up a tense dialogue between right-angled plastic foam scaffolding and the polyurethane forms--resembling sliced gourds--that it encloses." She also commended his approach, which involved utilizing a combination of disposable man-made materials, a rigid grid, and a pair of organic shapes. In an interview given to Shauna Snow of Los Angeles Times, he said "I like to emphasize the mathematical, analytical, conceptual, philosophical approach to art making; the intellectual substructure, I think, is critical. I'm very cognizant of my decision making--I don’t just write it off to some muse or something". Additionally, Michael Kimmelman also reviewed his work displayed at Diane Brown Gallery. He praised the way in which the use of glue, putty, and staples in his artwork adds a unique textural quality to the pieces, resulting in an unusual and quite graceful poetic quality.

In his review of Levine's plywood sculpture titled Hand Held (1997), Veron Ennis appreciated his efforts to capture the essence of masculinity through geometric form and raw material. Furthermore, he complimented his video work for its immersive exploration of exclusive sectors within the masculine world. Leila Farsakh while reviewing Levine's video works in her essay titled "Facing the Other: Women and Masculinity in the Work of Erik Levine" said "Levine's art speaks to women as much as men because it deals with the human condition in its fragility". She also lauded his efforts in uncovering how masculinity is constructed and emphasized its fragility, drawing a parallel to the isolation and cruelty of aging.

== Exhibitions ==
Levine's exhibitions includes a series of solo exhibitions held at galleries and museums in both the United States and Europe. His solo exhibitions include Diane Brown Gallery, New York (1988);, The Louisiana Museum of Modern Art, Humlebæk, Denmark (1989), Meyers/Bloom Gallery, Santa Monica, CA (1990); Städtische Galerie im Lenbachhaus, Munich, Germany (1993); Galerie Bela Jarzyk, Cologne, Germany (1995); Museum Pfalzgalerie Kaiserslautern, Germany (1998), Galerie Bernd Klüser, Munich, Germany (1995, 1993), Space Other, Boston, MA(2007); Museum of Contemporary Art, San Diego, CA (2010); Wexner Center for the Arts, Columbus, OH (2015) and Ludwig Forum Aachen, Germany (2017).

Levine has also participated in several group exhibitions including the 1989 Whitney Biennial Exhibition, Machine, Newport Harbor Art Museum, Newport Beach, CA (1995); Vortexhibition Polyphonica, Henry Art Gallery, Seattle, WA, (2009); Recent Acquisitions: Gifts of Art, Museum of Fine Arts, Boston, MA, (2006); Videonale.16, Kunstmuseum, Bonn, Germany, (2017); Dying well—False death, Museum für Neue Kunst, Freiburg, Germany (2017); and Someone Else, Museum für Neue Kunst, Freiburg, Germany (2022).

== Public collections ==
- Mead Art Museum, Amherst College, Amherst, MA
- Staatliche Graphische Sammlung, Munich, Germany
- Pfalzgalerie Kaiserslautern, Germany
- Fisher-Landau Center, Long Island City, NY
- Grinnell College, Grinnell, IA
- Weatherspoon Art Gallery, Greensboro, NC
- Orange County Art Museum, Orange County, CA
- The New School, New York, NY
- Brooklyn Museum of Art, Brooklyn, NY
- Lenbachhaus, Munich, Germany
- Madison Art Center, Madison, WI
- The Museum of Contemporary Art, Los Angeles, CA
- Portland Art Museum, Portland, OR
- The Walker Art Center, Minneapolis, MN
- Louisiana Museum of Modern Art, Humlebæk, Denmark
- High Museum of Art, Atlanta, GA
- The Museum of Contemporary Art, Geneva, Switzerland
- Chase Manhattan Bank, New York, NY
- Albright-Knox Art Gallery, Buffalo, NY
- Hirshhorn Museum and Sculpture Garden, Washington, DC
- Milwaukee Art Museum, Milwaukee, WI
- National Museum of Contemporary Art, Oslo, Norway
- Whitney Museum of American Art, New York, NY
- Addison Gallery of American Art, Andover, MA
- Fogg Art Museum, Cambridge, MA
- Des Moines Art Center, Des Moines, IA
- Miami Art Museum, Miami, FL
- Museum of Fine Arts, Boston, MA
- Henry Art Gallery, Seattle, WA
- Museum of Contemporary Art, San Diego, CA
- Norton Museum of Art, West Palm Beach, FL
- Tampa Museum of Art, Tampa, FL
- The Museum of Fine Arts Houston, Houston, TX
- Magasin III Museum & Foundation for Contemporary Art, Stockholm, Sweden
- McNay Art Museum, San Antonio, TX
- Williams College Museum of Art in Public Collections

== Awards and honors ==
- 1992 – Guggenheim Fellowship, Guggenheim Foundation
- 2004 – Grant, Nancy Graves Foundation
- 2010 – Residency, Outpost Artists Resources
- 2019 – Rauschenberg Residency, Robert Rauschenberg Foundation

== Bibliography ==
=== Books ===
- Erik Levine: As a Matter of Fact (2017) ISBN 9783903153479
