= River to River Festival =

Annual arts festival held in summer in Lower Manhattan in New York City

River To River Festival
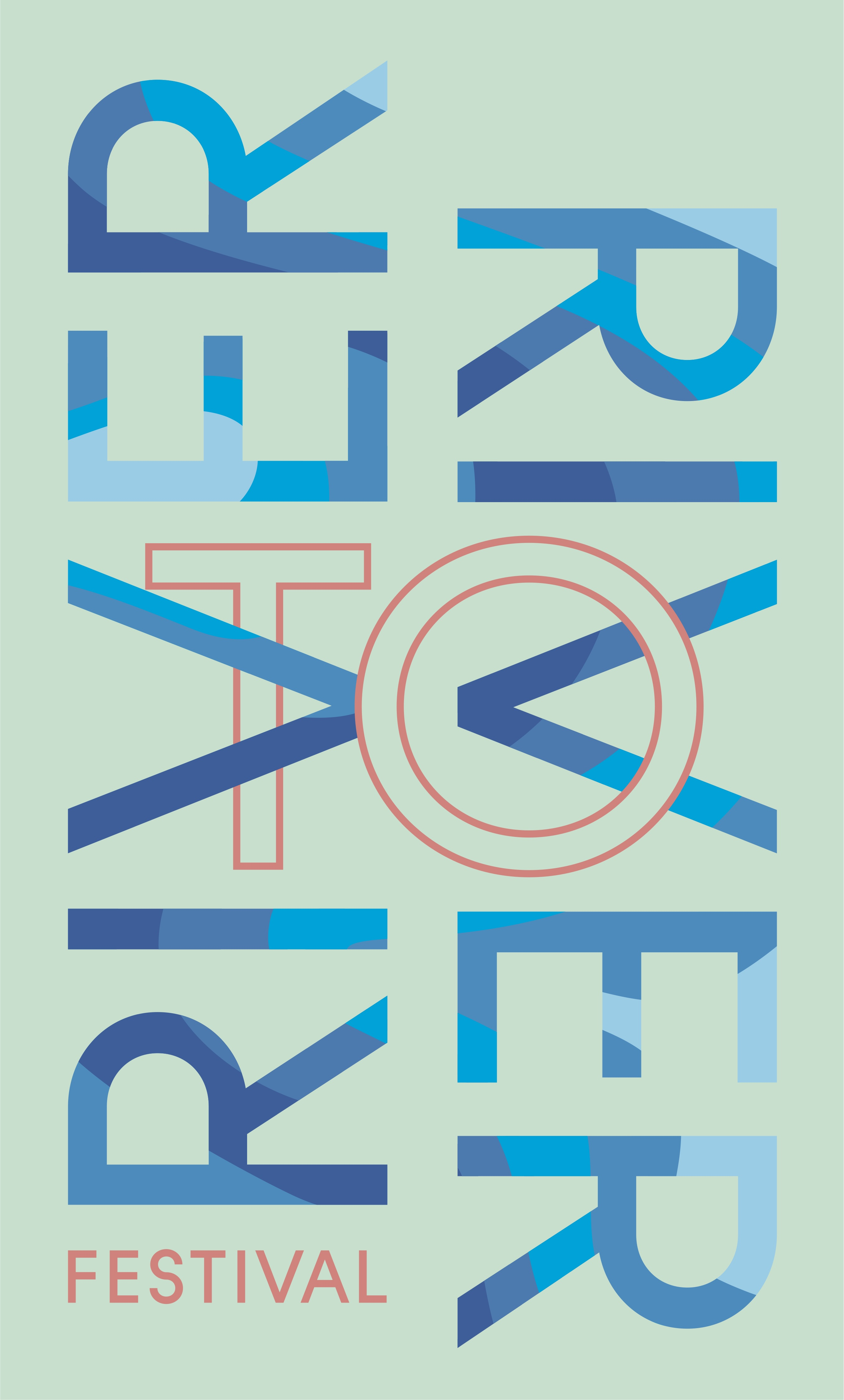
- Dates: Summer - typically June, 2020 edition is July - August
- Location: New York
- Years active: 2002 - present
- Website: lmcc.net/river-to-river-festival

The River To River Festival is an annual arts festival held in summer in Lower Manhattan in New York City. The festival presents live art and installations in public spaces and in partnership with institutions in Lower Manhattan. It is presented by the Lower Manhattan Cultural Council.

The festival includes dance, visual and performance art, poetry, film, music, theatre, and other events that are free and open to the public.

== History ==
The River To River Festival was founded in 2002 by American Express, The Port Authority of New York and New Jersey, the Alliance for Downtown New York, Arts Brookfield, Battery Park City Authority, Lower Manhattan Cultural Council, and South Street Seaport. It was created as an effort to revitalize the Lower Manhattan community after the September 11 attacks by promoting cultural activity and making Lower Manhattan an important experience of New York City's history, art, and commerce.

The Lower Manhattan Cultural Council became the lead organizer and producer of the festival in 2011.
