= Michael North (professor) =

- Occupation: Professor
- Writing career
- Genres: 19th & 20th century British literature and American Literature
- Notable works: The Dialect of Modernism: Race, Language, and Twentieth-Century Literature; The Waste Land: A Norton Critical Edition (editor); Reading 1922: A Return to the Scene of the Modern

Michael North is an American literary critic and a professor in the department of English at the University of California, Los Angeles.

== Background ==
North received a B.A. from Stanford University in 1973 and Ph.D. from the University of Connecticut in 1980. North taught at the College of William and Mary before joining the University of California, Los Angeles in 1991.

He became a member of the American Academy of Arts and Sciences in 2012.

== Publications ==
- Novelty: A History of the New, Chicago: The University of Chicago Press, ISBN 9780226077871, 2013
- Machine-Age Comedy, 2009
- Camera Works: Photography and the Twentieth-Century Word, 2005
- Reading 1922: A Return to the Scene of the Modern, 2002
- The Waste Land (Norton Critical Editions), 2001 (editor)
- The Dialect of Modernism: Race, Language, and Twentieth-Century Literature, 1994
- The Political Aesthetic of Yeats, Eliot, and Pound, 1992
- Henry Green and the Writing of His Generation,1984

== See also ==
- Modernist literature
- Modernist poetry
