= Wassaic, New York =

- Hamlet and CDP
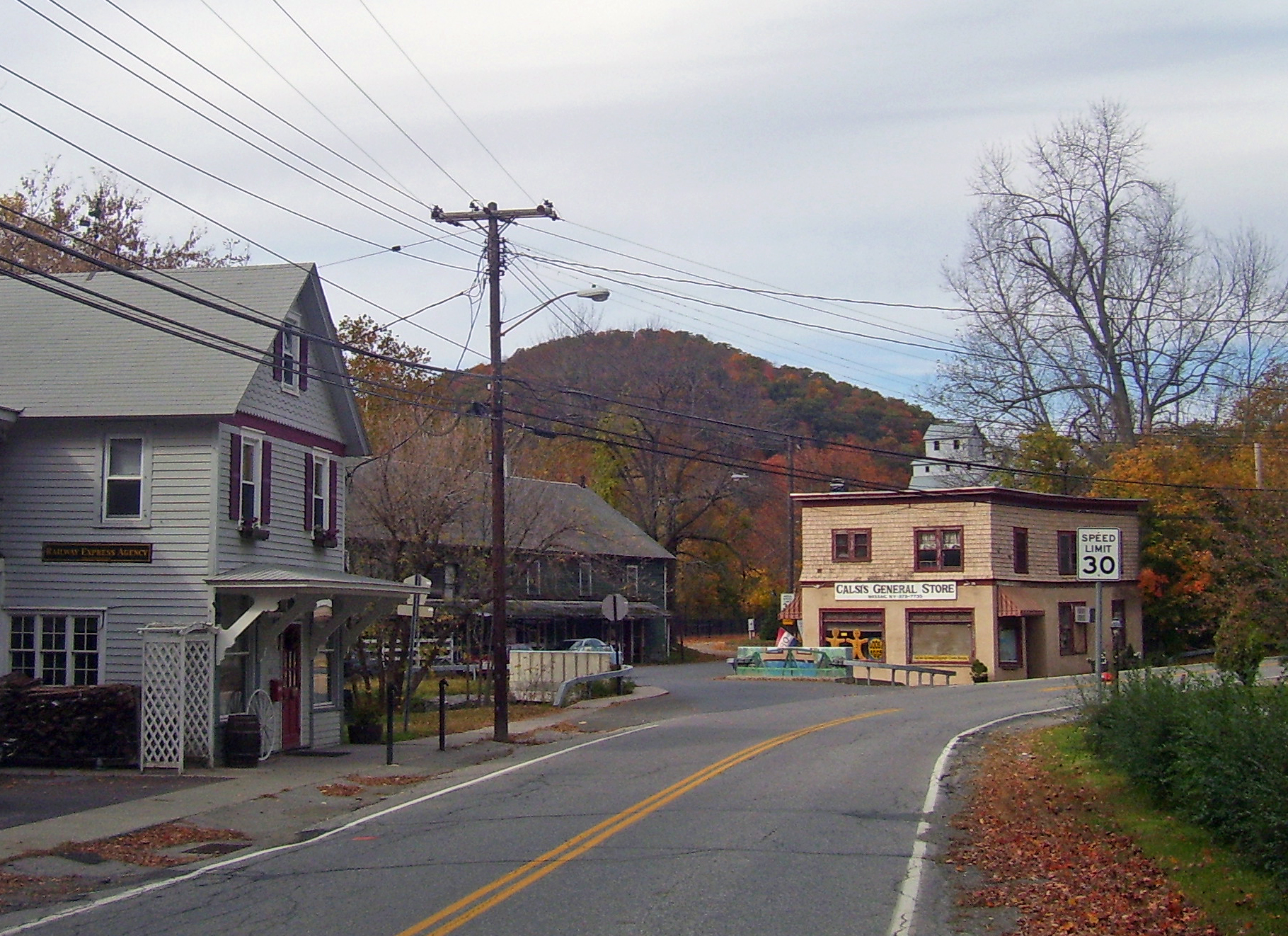
- Downtown Wassaic

- Location in New York state
- Coordinates: 41.8039825°N 73.5587368°W
- Country: United States
- State: New York
- County: Dutchess
- Town: Amenia
- Elevation: 456 ft (139 m)

Population
  - Total: 210
- Time zone: UTC−5 (Eastern (EST))
  - Summer (DST): UTC−4 (EDT)
- ZIP Code: 12592
- Area code: 845
- GNIS feature ID: 968879

Wassaic (/wɑːˈseɪ.ik/ wah-SAY-ik) is a hamlet and census-designated place in the town of Amenia, Dutchess County, New York, United States. As of the 2020 census, its population is 210. Located in southeastern New York in the valley of the Ten Mile River, Wassaic is bordered to the east and west by mountain ranges.

The name of the hamlet is derived from the Native American word Washaic; "land of difficult access" or "narrow valley". However, Europeans found ready access by following the Housatonic River valley up from Long Island Sound and through the mountains along the Ten Mile River.

One of the earliest recorded Europeans to settle in Wassaic was Richard Sackett. He petitioned the Colonial Government on March 11, 1703 for a license to purchase a tract of land in "Washiack". He was known as Captain Richard Sackett when appointed the first Dutchess County clerk in 1715.

By the 1770s, Wassaic was processing Ancram pig iron into steel. This continued into the early 1800s, providing steel for the Harris scythe works at Hammertown, near Pine Plains in northern Dutchess.

During the Revolutionary War, General George Washington marched through Wassaic on the way to Connecticut.

Among Wassaic's main employers in the 19th century were Gridley Iron Works and the Harlem division of the New York and Harlem Railroad. In 1861, Gail Borden opened a factory for producing a condensed milk that would not need refrigeration. This was a welcome ration for the Union troops during the Civil War. Long sold by Borden, it is today marketed as Eagle Brand Condensed Milk. Wassaic was also known for dairy, sheep and grain farming.

Wassaic is home to The Wassaic Project, a non-profit arts and music organization and the Wassaic Artist Residency. They provide summer programming as well as run an artist in residence program.

== Demographics ==
Historical population
Census	Pop.	Note	%±
2020	210		—
U.S. Decennial Census

== Transportation ==
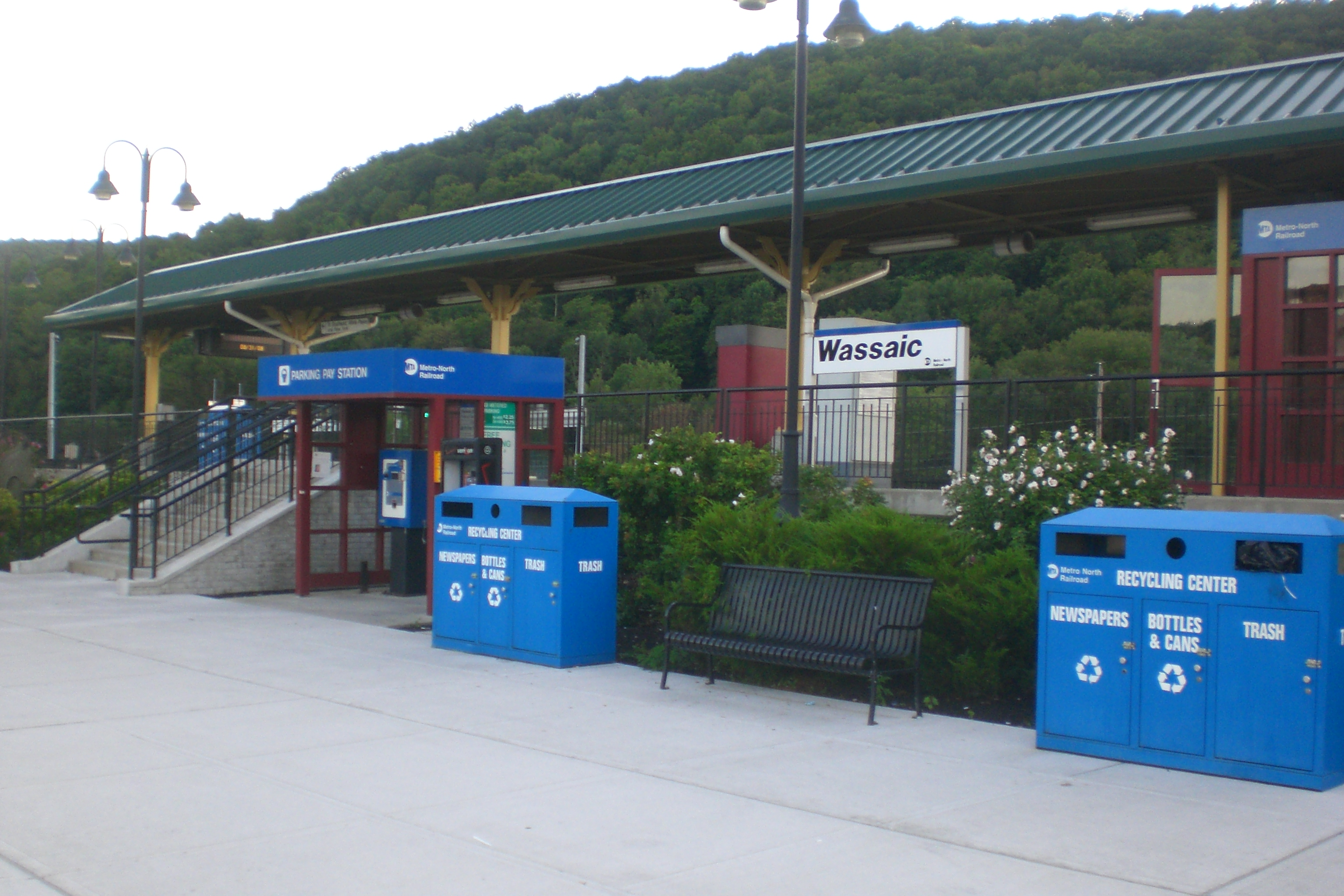
Wassaic railroad station

Wassaic station is the northernmost station on the Harlem Line of Metro-North Railroad. The station, once located in the hamlet, has been moved one mile north of it. The station also provides access to the Harlem Valley Rail Trail, a paved sidewalk constructed along the former railroad roadbed subsequent to the removal of the trackage in 1983, thereby precluding the extension of passenger service beyond Wassaic.
