= Mary Ann Unger =

American sculptor

- Unger and her daughter in front of Sheaves, Dark Icons, Klarfeld Perry Gallery, 1992
- Born: Mary Ann Unger; May 10, 1945; New Jersey, United States
- Died: December 28, 1998 (aged 53)
- Education: Mount Holyoke College, Columbia University
- Occupation: Sculptor
- Known for: Large scale works
- Awards: Guggenheim Fellowship, Pollock-Krasner Foundation grants recipient, Yaddo resident fellow
- Website: maryannunger.com

Mary Ann Unger (May 10, 1945 – December 28, 1998) was an American sculptor known for large scale, semi-abstract public works in which she evoked the body, bandaging, flesh, and bone. She is known for dark, bulbous, beam-like forms. Her sculptures concern universal issues such as death and regeneration and are described as transcending time and place. Unger received a Guggenheim Fellowship and Pollock-Krasner Foundation grants and was a resident fellow at Yaddo. Her work is found in collections such as the Hirshhorn Museum and Sculpture Garden, the Brooklyn Museum of Art, the Philadelphia Museum of Art, the Albright-Knox Art Gallery, and the High Museum of Art. In 2018, Unger's work was acquired by both the Whitney Museum of American Art and the Art Institute of Chicago.

== Background ==
Mary Ann Unger was a sculptor known for her large scale works with subtle expression, in which she evoked the body, bandaging, flesh, and bone. Born in 1945, she was raised in New Jersey. She learned to weld, cast, and carve as an undergraduate student at Mt. Holyoke College, where she later earned a bachelor's degree in 1967. After a year of graduate study at the University of California at Berkeley, she spent several years traveling, including a trip alone through North Africa. She later earned an M.F.A at Columbia University in 1975, where she studied with Ronald Bladen and George Sugarman. She had solo exhibitions at the New York City Sculpture Center, the New Jersey State Museum, the Klarfeld Perry Gallery, and the Trans Hudson Gallery. She received a Guggenheim Fellowship and Pollock-Krasner Foundation grants and was a resident fellow at Yaddo. She became known for dark, bulbous, beamlike forms that were laid out or propped up in clusters. These pieces were made of hydrocal, a lightweight plaster, over steel armatures, with surfaces that appeared scarred and scorched. Her sculptures spoke of universal issues such as death and regeneration, and transcended time and place. Unger died in 1998 aged 53 from breast cancer.

== Public art ==
Unger produced a site-specific installation called Tweed Garden at Tweed Courthouse in New York in 1985. It was an environmental work clustered like a forest with passageways. The 10 painted hexagonal columns are each 9 feet tall and flared like trees or flowers. The columns are open in the middle and rise in layers, reaching toward the light from the glass dome above. It has been described as heavy with meaning yet light and ornamental in architecture.

That same year, Unger produced a site-specific installation for the Phillip and Muriel Berman Museum of Art at Ursinus College of Pennsylvania. Unger's Temple was a gazebo-like structure of red aluminum placed in a group of cherry trees. It was constructed in an openwork fashion with aluminum plate ribs. From afar, the monument looked like a giant party decoration. Its circus-like color scheme echoed nineteenth century park architecture, but it was still integrated into the park well.

In 1988, Unger's Family was installed at Bellevue Hospital Park in New York City. Critics called it a point of departure for an artist whose private and public works had previously remained separate. The sculpture consists of three life-size abstract forms aligned as if processing. Each element is both architectural and symbolic. One has been described as looking like a dragon tail or a carrot with large conical breasts, while another is more like a cross between an arch, a stepladder, and a stretching gymnast. The third takes a two-part form, with the top like a tuning fork and the bottom like a lush, curvy body in a dress. Unger successfully used pigmented cement overlaid on steel to evoke something earthly and organic.

Unger's airy and grand monument known as Ode to Tatlin was commissioned as a permanent work in 1991 by the Aaron Copland School of Music at Queens College in New York. The sculpture forms a gateway to the school in the shape of an ellipse sliced in half to leave an entrance in the middle. It was inspired by Monument to the Third International, a grand building designed by the Russian artist Vladimir Tatlin that was never constructed. It was meant to suggest staves of music and the supports of a rollercoaster with a swooping path that contrasts the drab and incoherent stretch of campus where it is situated. Critics were not fond of the sherbet colors of the painted slats of the monument because they found the excessive amount of sweetness almost sickening; however, from farther away, they acknowledged the power and splendor it emanated in its commonplace surroundings.

== Exhibitions ==
Unger's work was exhibited in the 1985 show, “The Figure as an Image of the Psyche”, at the Sculpture Center in New York, whose main theme was the use of human figures to confront and transform difficult and extreme responses and experiences. The gallery looked like a war zone and was a reminder that declaratory emotional statements are always possible. The show had the edge and tone of the work Mary Ann Unger contributed. One of her works, Supplicant, was an overwhelming piece made of hydrocal. It can be described as representing a bald head impaled on a spine that supports four vertically-aligned breasts. With small outstretched arms, like the feathers or wings of some prehistoric bird, and a huge mouth open toward the sky, the sculpture suggests frantic desire and symbolizes both a cry of pain and a song of faith.

In 1989, Unger curated a show called “In a Dark Vein,” at the Sculpture Center in New York. It featured work by women who used the human figure to shape feelings of fear, loss, and pain and was inspired by Unger's own struggle with cancer. In this show, she tried to focus on a more naked and physical reality and the search for experience that is shared and elemental. Unger included her bonded iron sculpture, Guardian, which both expresses and mediates suffering. It shows a nude woman, cut off at the waist, with her hands on her hips. The sculpture's mouth is like a pit facing the sky and her arms are like wings. The earthly figure suggests a fertility goddess insisting on her ability to reproduce and crying to get out of her skin. “In a Dark Vein” was filled with representations of the female body shaped by a woman's hand.

In 1989 Unger also exhibited at the Sculpture Center Festival at the Snug Harbor Cultural Center in Staten Island, a work called Pall Bearers. The sculpture is made of hydrocal over steel with pigment, wax, and graphite. It seems that Unger's illness caused her to become more introspective and create bodies of work that dealt with the fragility of the self. Pall Bearers is an allusion to the post-and-lintel construction method, with a horizontal member over an opening created by two vertical columns. In the sculpture, the two vertical posts are shaped like forearms, which support a sausage-like form covered in bloody bandages. Unger seems to reveal her pain through the festering wounds; for some, the sculpture was too painful to view. It also connotes passage, transformation, and new life. It has been described as leaving an impression of a timeless battle between death and love with death in the lead. The work was later shown at “Dark Icons”, held at the Klarfeld Perry Gallery in New York in 1992.

In the exhibition, “Dark Icons,” (New York, 1992) Unger was overcoming a bout of cancer that helped to broaden the metaphorical range of her work from a personal scream of victimization to a generalized but powerful meditation on mortality. The show contained seven sculptures, all made from steel armatures wrapped in plaster-soaked gauze, colored with pigment, wax, and graphite. The bulky, rounded sculptures draw a parallel between bearing the dead and bearing a child or a seed. Pieta/Monument to War consists of two roughly bandaged pillars bending inward and straining under the weight of an eviscerated and headless figure. The figure is held up by its stump-like arms and features a long slouched sack pigmented red. The title refers to an image of mourning, yet the gory trough of the figure evokes associations with menstruation and birth. Unger seemed to be aware of Baroque artists who struggled to show the weight of Christ hanging from the cross or the sag of his body draped in Mary's lap.

The bandaging in Deposition/ Nature Mourned was partially removed due to more sanding and filing than in Unger's other pieces. It is made of two short, forking uprights that cradle a bundle of long, sagging stem-like forms. The title implies that the objects are being brought down for burial, but the form seems swollen with life. One could read the bandaging as an infant wrapped in a blanket and the forks as the huge hands of some sort of motherly deity. The piece represents the possibility of regeneration after ridding oneself of fear and loss.

In 1994, Unger transformed the Trans Hudson Gallery into a vault of concrete shapes that look almost like the remains of giants. Included in the show was Across the Bering Strait, a work that occupied Unger for two years before it was exhibited. The sculpture is a crowd of shapes that are phallic, intuitive, and sausage-like, laid as if thrown onto its stubby supports. The theme is migration and, according to Unger, the title refers to the Mongol migration across the land bridge between Asia and Alaska. The cradles that hold the elongated forms were seen as immigrants’ bundled possessions, tent poles, and primitive life forms, while the work speaks on a deeper level about individual movement and the cycle of life. For art reviewer Vivien Raynor, however, it brought up visions of mutilation and monstrous fungi proliferating in caves. Raynor described it as a show that one would not want to spend the night with.

Unger's subsequent solo exhibition at the Trans Hudson Gallery in 1997 featured five sculptures that display her strong interest in organic forms. Shanks consists of three nine-foot vertical bony shafts, each with a rounded point on the floor and topped with a bulbous knob. Two knobs, imitating the ball of a ball-and-socket joint, protrude just above the middle of each shaft. The white hydrocal was roughly scarred to give the appearance of bone. One critic got the impression that the sculpture was the leg bone of some huge prehistoric animal. Another believed the sculptures were like stern goddesses gazing down on their followers. The sculpture exemplified Unger's inclinations – rational yet connected to nature, serene but passionate, rigorously formed yet playful. Unger also included a wall-mounted sculpture titled Black Heart, a darkly poetic version of a heart that hovers without apparent support. Its black scorched and pitted surface looks like damaged skin over muscle. Its mythic presence is in line with the symbolism of the origin of emotion. It suggests that life processes are just as metaphysical as they are scientific.

== Legacy ==
Unger's art has been described as moving easily across cultures and through the history of art. She challenged the skepticism that sculpture could carry and transmit meaning. Her works reminded viewers that beneath our withered elements are stable, regenerative forces. She ultimately used the life-renewing energies found in creating her art as a form of healing. After her death in 1998, a 15-year retrospective was held at the McDonough Museum of Art in Youngstown, Ohio in 2000. Solo exhibitions have taken place at the Davidson Gallery in NYC in 2011, 2016, and 2019 .

In July 2022, the Williams College Museum of Art organized Unger's first museum survey in over twenty years, curated by Horace D. Ballard. Visual critic Cassie Packard, in a review for Frieze, asserted that this is “a long-overdue exhibition, sensitively curated by Horace D. Ballard." While Jackson Davidow, writing for Artforum said, “This stunning exhibition sets the stage for a critical reassessment of her ever-vibrant and undeniably relevant work.”

Her work is found in collections such as the Whitney Museum of American Art, the Hirshhorn Museum and Sculpture Garden, the Art Institute of Chicago, the Brooklyn Museum of Art, the Philadelphia Museum of Art, the Albright-Knox Art Gallery, and the High Museum of Art.
