= Joseph Nekl =

Czech politician (1953–2021)

Joseph Nekl (28 May 1953 – 29 March 2021) was a Czech politician who served as a member of the Chamber of Deputies of the Czech Republic from 2010 till 2017.

He died on 29 March 2021, at the age of 68, from COVID-19.
