= 2020 in science =

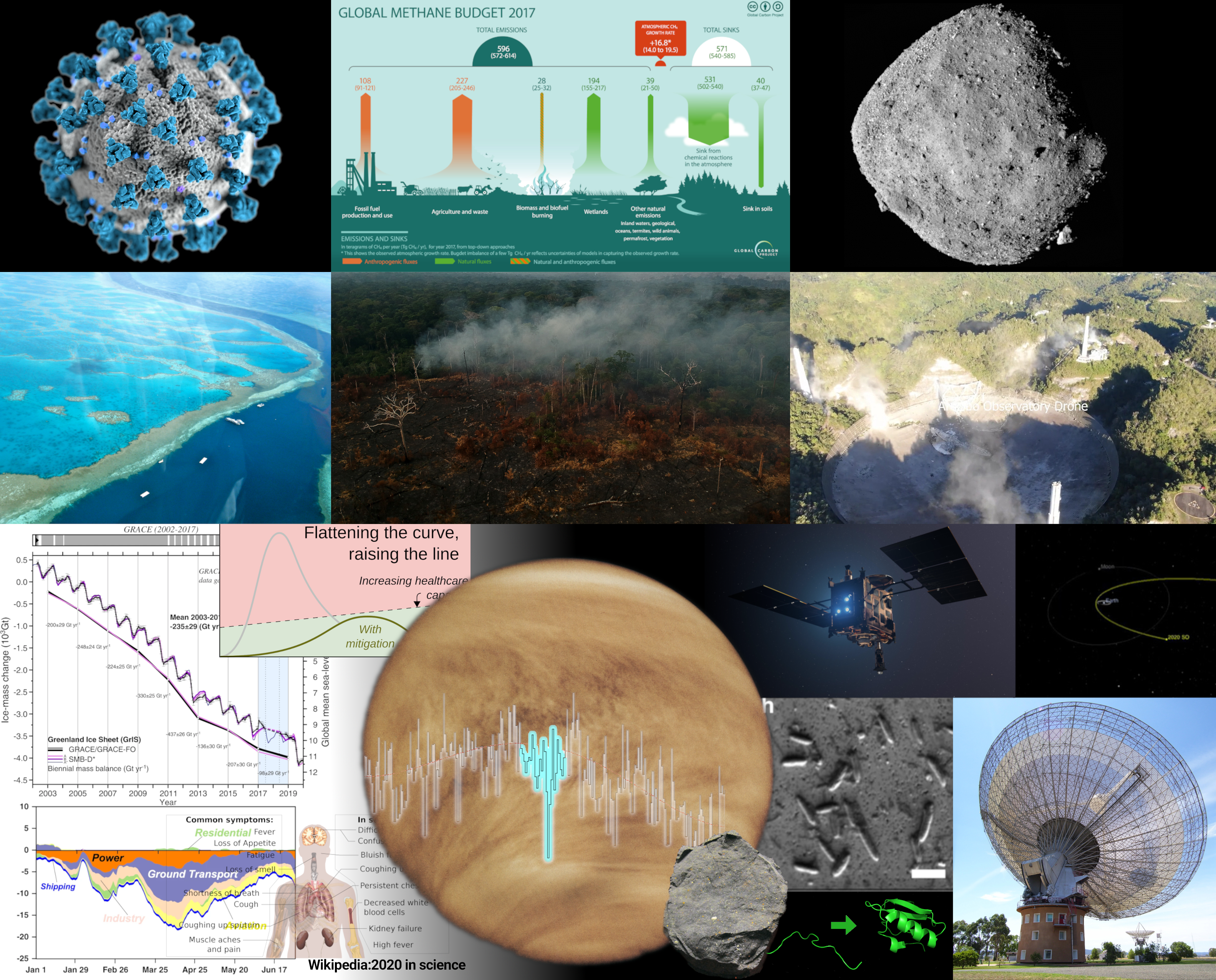

A number of significant scientific events occurred in 2020.

== Events ==
=== July ===
July 2020 in science

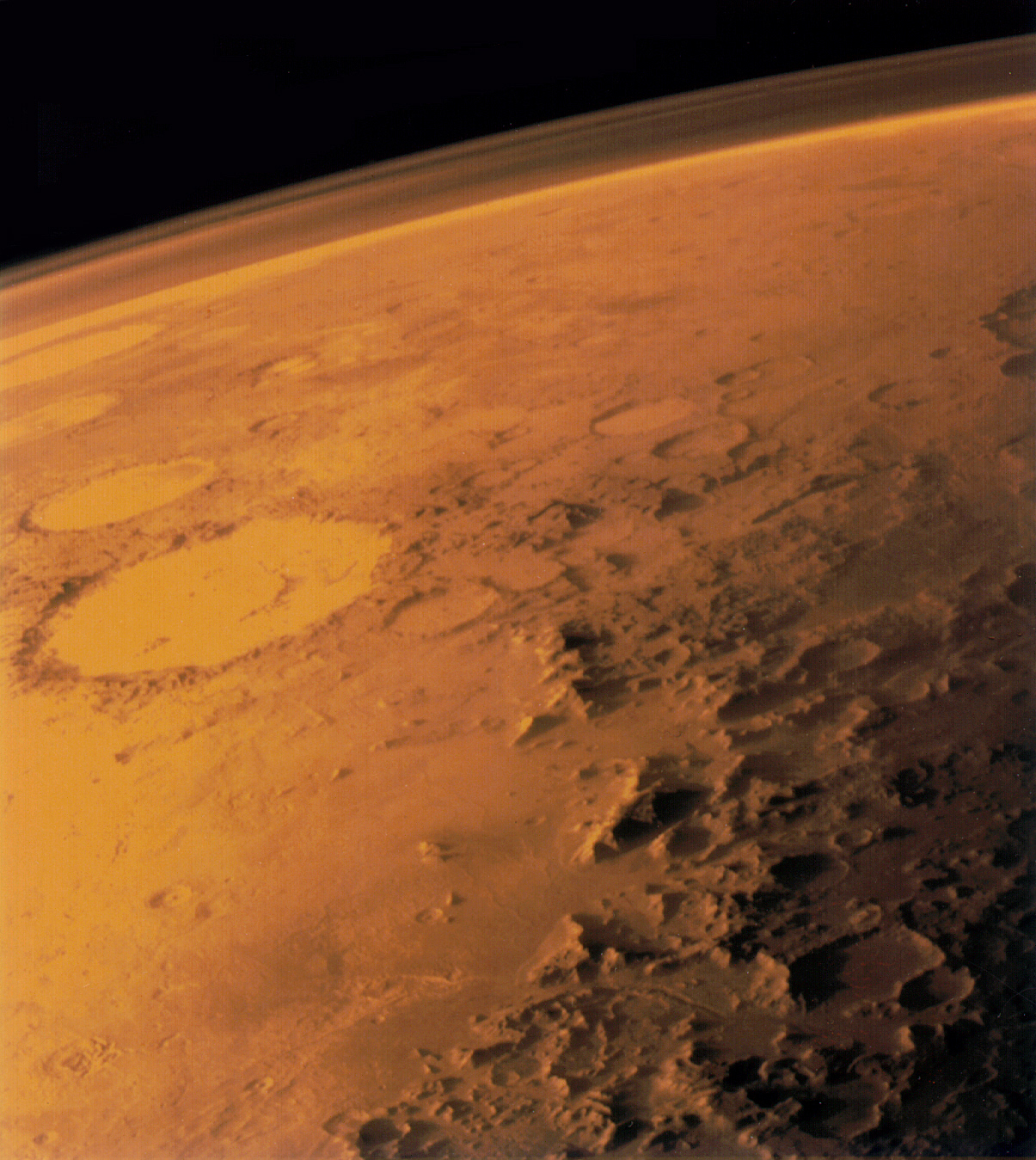
July: The UAE, China, and the United States launch probes to Mars.

- 1 July
  - Scientist at CERN report that the LHCb experiment has observed a four-charm tetraquark particle never seen before, which is likely to be the first of a previously undiscovered class of particles.
  - Scientists report that they measured that quantum vacuum fluctuations can influence the motion of macroscopic, human-scale objects for the first time by measuring correlations below the standard quantum limit between the position/momentum uncertainty of the mirrors of LIGO and the photon number/phase uncertainty of light that they reflect.
- 2 July – Scientists report that a more infectious SARS-CoV-2 variant with spike protein variant G614 has replaced D614 as the dominant form in the pandemic.

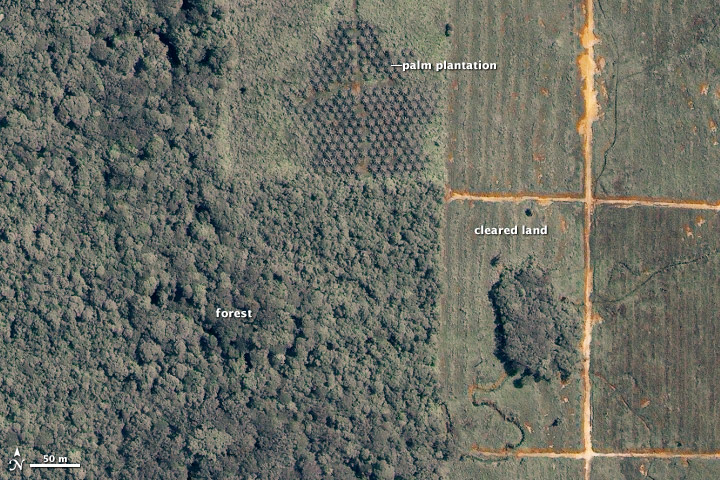
3 July: Via analysis of satellite images, scientists show that certified "sustainable" palm oil production resulted in deforestation of tropical forests of Sumatra and Borneo and endangered mammals' habitat degradation in the last 30 years.

- 3 July
  - Scientists report in a preprint that a major genetic risk factor of the SARS-CoV-2 was inherited from archaic Neanderthals ~60,000 years ago.
  - Scientists show that adding an organic-based ionic solid into perovskites can result in substantial improvement in solar cell performance and stability. The study also reveals a complex degradation route that is responsible for failures in aged perovskite solar cells. The understanding could help the future development of photovoltaic technologies with industrially relevant longevity.
  - Via analysis of satellite images, scientists show that certified "sustainable" palm oil production resulted in deforestation of tropical forests of Sumatra and Borneo and endangered mammals' habitat degradation in the last 30 years.
- 4 July
  - According to WHO chief scientist Dr. Soumya Swaminathan, the Infection Fatality Rate (IFR) of COVID-19 and related pandemic is currently estimated at 0.6%, and the Case Fatality Rate (CFR) at 5%.
  - Scientists report that COVID-19 may be an airborne disease, and not just one transmitted by droplets of the virus in the air or on surfaces.
- 6 July
  - Astronomers report evidence that the chemical element carbon, the fourth most abundant chemical element (after hydrogen, helium and oxygen) in the universe, and one of the most essential chemical elements for the formation of life as we know it, was formed mainly in white dwarf stars, particularly those bigger than two solar masses.
  - The Versatile Video Coding standard (H.266) is finalised, designed to halve the bitrate of previous formats, and paving the way for on-demand 8K streaming services.
  - Scientists report that analysis of simulations and a recent observational field model show that maximum rates of directional change of Earth's magnetic field reached ~10° per year – almost 100 times faster than current changes and ~10 times faster than previously thought.
  - Researchers at the University of Texas at Austin demonstrate a cobalt-free, high-energy, lithium-ion battery.

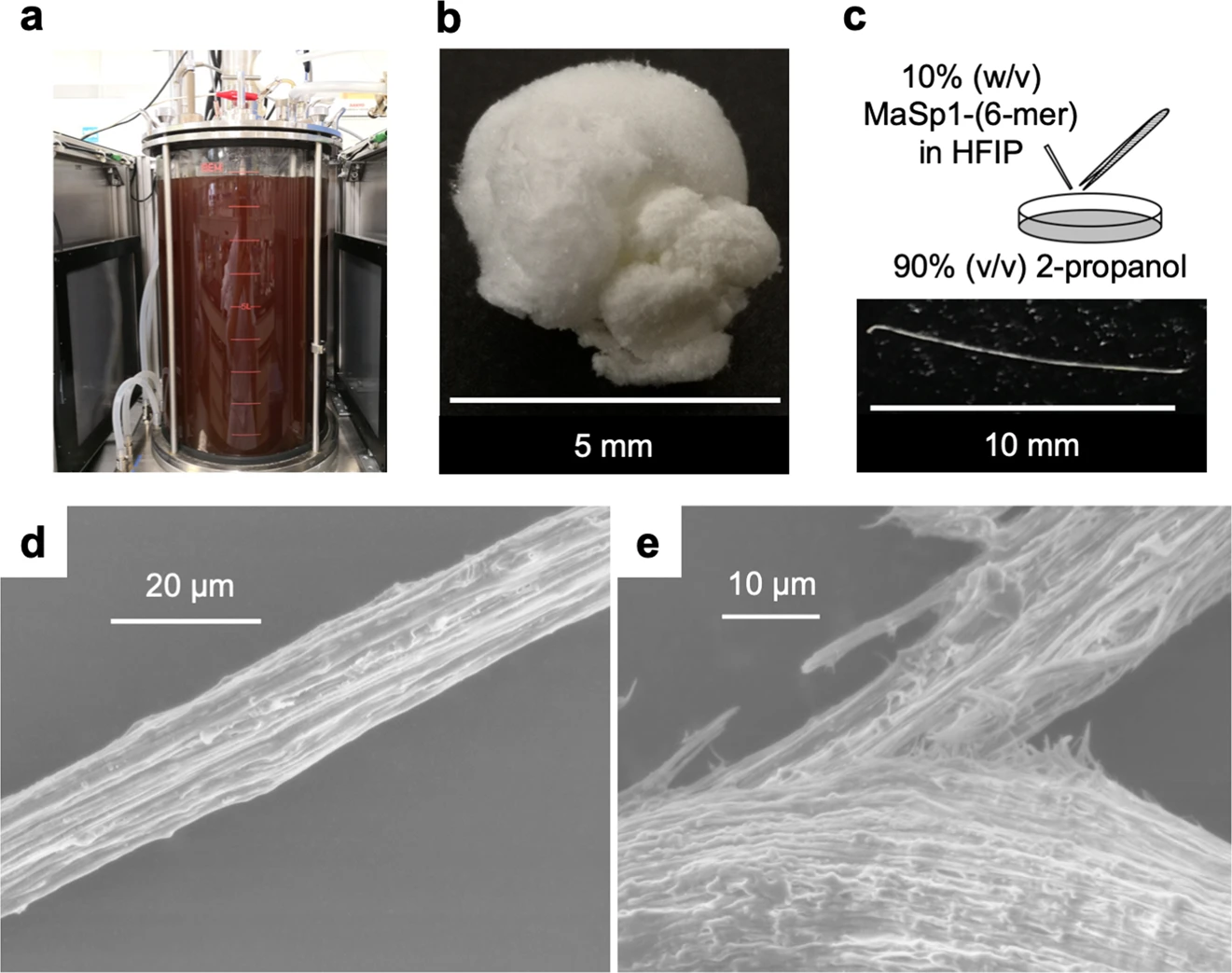
8 July: Researchers report that they succeeded in using a genetically altered variant of R. sulfidophilum to produce spidroins, the main proteins in spider silk.

- 8 July
  - Scientists writing in the journal Brain publish evidence that a few mildly affected or recovering COVID-19 patients can be left with serious or potentially fatal brain conditions, such as delirium, inflammation, nerve damage, and psychosis.
  - Mitochondria are gene-edited for the first time, using a new kind of CRISPR-free base editor (DdCBE), by a team at the Broad Institute.
  - The World Meteorological Organisation (WMO) announces that it assesses a 20% chance that global warming compared to pre-industrial levels will exceed 1.5 °C in at least one year within the five years of 2020–2024. 1.5 °C is often considered to be a key threshold of global warming and nations have agreed to attempt limiting contemporary climate change to it under the Paris Agreement.
  - A team of researchers report that they succeeded in using a genetically altered variant of R. sulfidophilum to produce spidroins, the main proteins in spider silk.
  - Scientists assess that the geoengineering technique of enhanced rock weathering – spreading finely crushed basalt on fields – has potential use for carbon dioxide removal by nations, identifying costs, opportunities and engineering challenges.
  - Scientist report the development of a mobile robot chemist and demonstrate that it can assist in experimental searches. According to the scientists their strategy was automating the researcher rather than the instruments – freeing up time for the human researchers to think creatively – and could identify photocatalyst mixtures for hydrogen production from water that were six times more active than initial formulations.
- 9 July – The World Health Organization (WHO) formally recognises that COVID-19 can be transmitted indoors by droplets in the air. People in crowded settings with poor ventilation run the risk of being infected, according to the updated scientific advice.

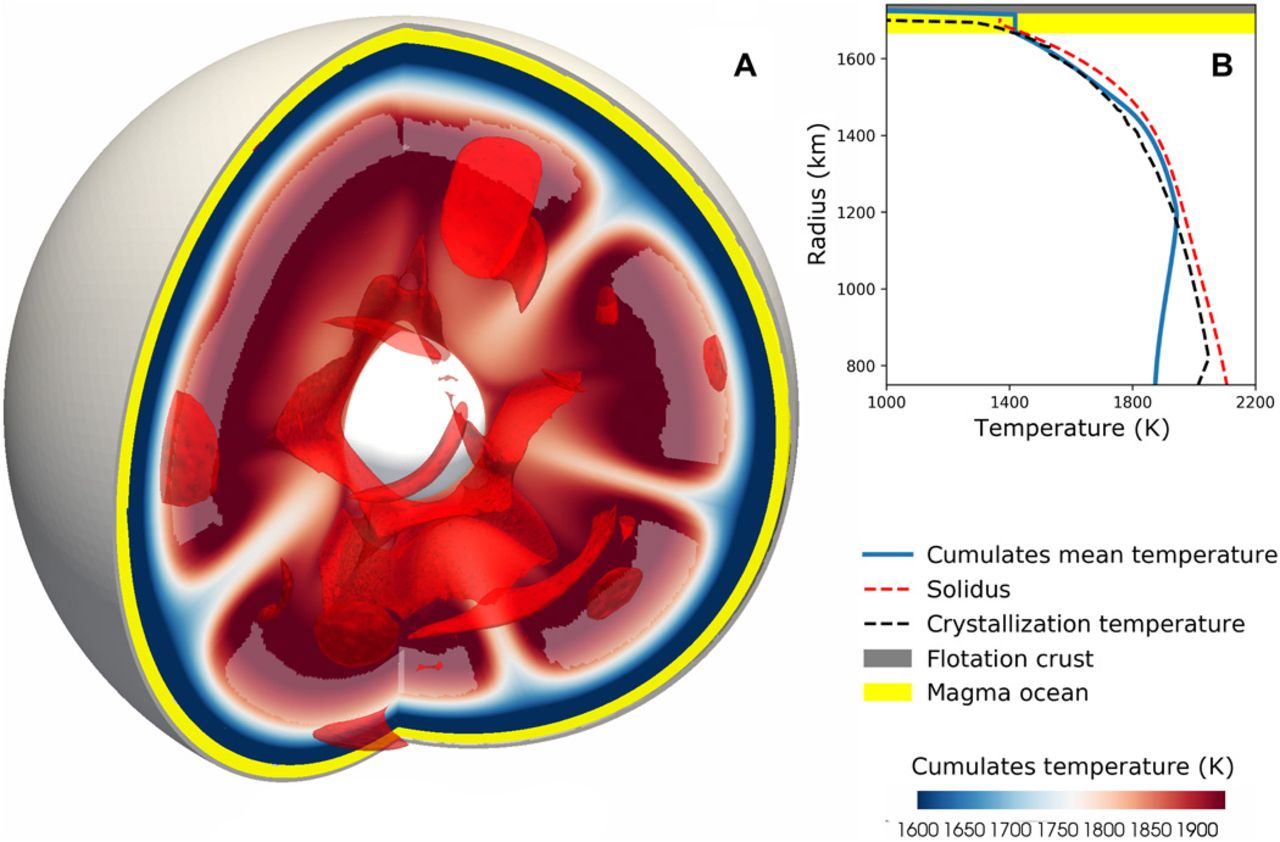
10 July: Scientists report that the Moon formed slightly later than thought (4.425 ±0.025 bya) and that it hosted an ocean of magma for much longer than previously thought (~200 My). Image: the thermal state of the Moon at age 100 My (from the study)

- 10 July
  - Astronomers announce the discovery of the South Pole Wall, a massive cosmic structure formed by a giant wall of galaxies (a galaxy filament) that extends across at least 700 million light-years of space.
  - Scientists report that phytoplankton primary production in the Arctic Ocean increased by 57% between 1998 and 2018 due to higher concentrations, suggesting the ocean may be able to support higher trophic level production and additional carbon fixation in the future.
  - Scientists report that the Moon formed about 85 million years later than thought (4.425 ±0.025 bya) and that it hosted an ocean of magma for longer than previously thought (~200 million years).

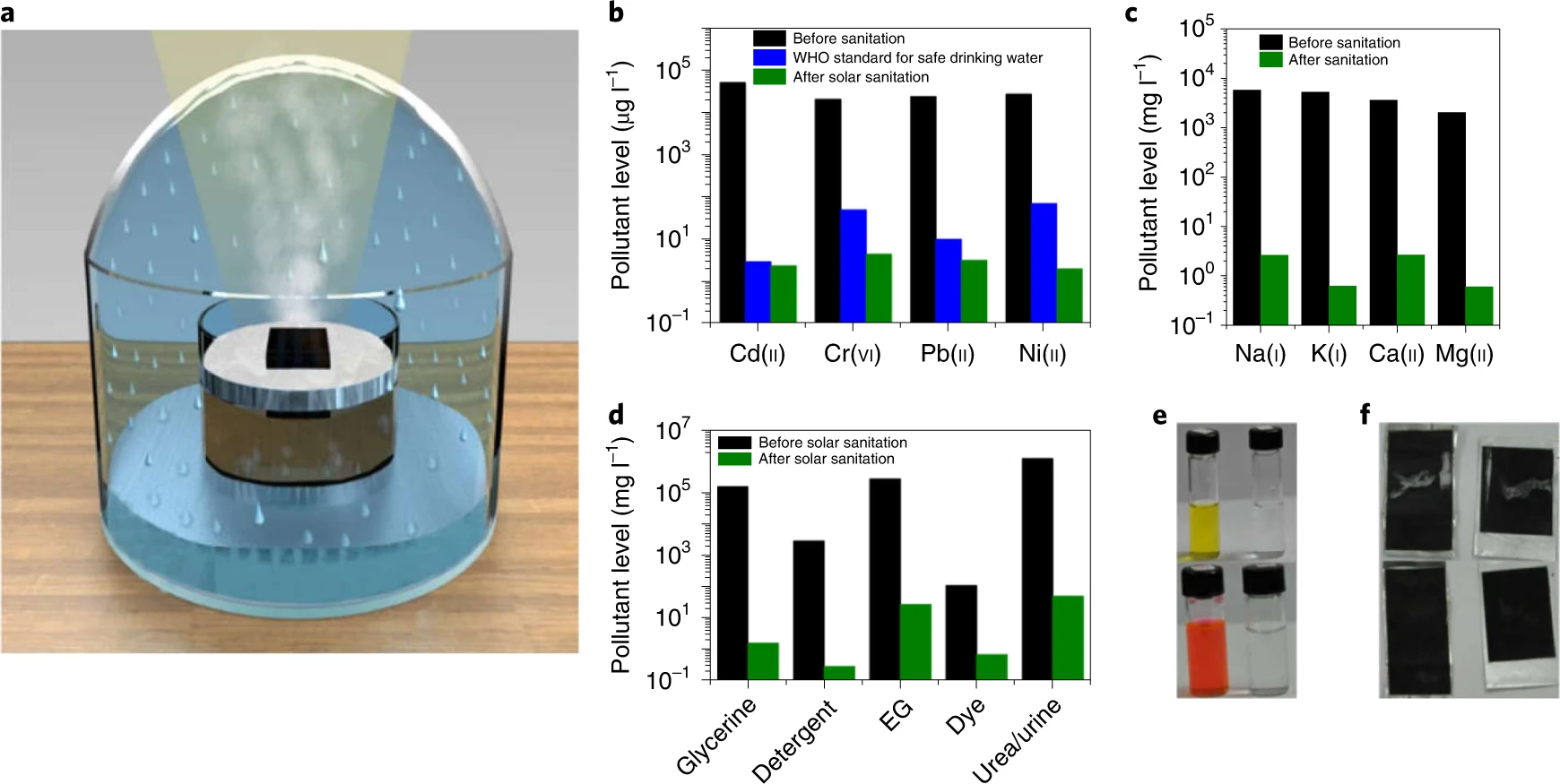
13 July: Researchers report the development of a reusable aluminium surface for efficient solar-based water sanitation.

- 13 July – Researchers report the development of a reusable aluminium surface for efficient solar-based water sanitation to below the WHO and EPA standards for drinkable water.
- 14 July – Scientists report the first complete and gap-less assembly of a human X chromosome.

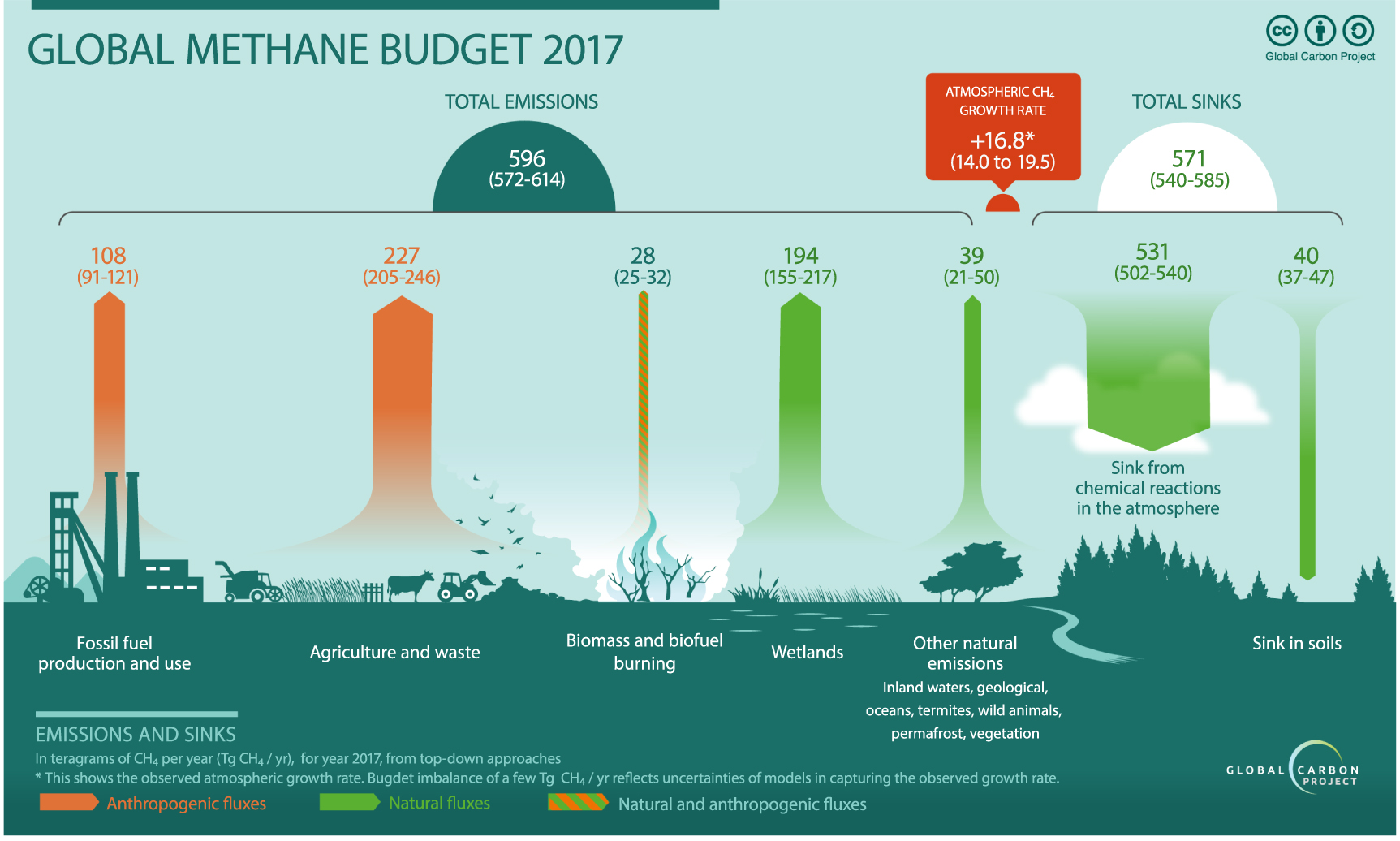
15 July: In two studies of the Global Carbon Project researchers summarise and analyse new estimates of the global methane budget and provide data and insights on sources and sinks for the geographical regions and economic sectors where the rising anthropogenic methane emissions have changed the most over recent decades.

- 15 July
  - Researchers report the discovery of chemolithoautotrophic bacterial culture that feeds on the metal manganese after performing unrelated experiments and named its bacterial species Candidatus Manganitrophus noduliformans and Ramlibacter lithotrophicus.
  - In two studies researchers of the Global Carbon Project summarise and analyse new estimates of the global methane budget and provide data and insights on sources and sinks for the geographical regions and economic sectors where the rising anthropogenic methane emissions have changed the most over recent decades. According to the studies, global methane emissions for the 2008 to 2017 decade increased by almost 10 percent compared to the previous decade.

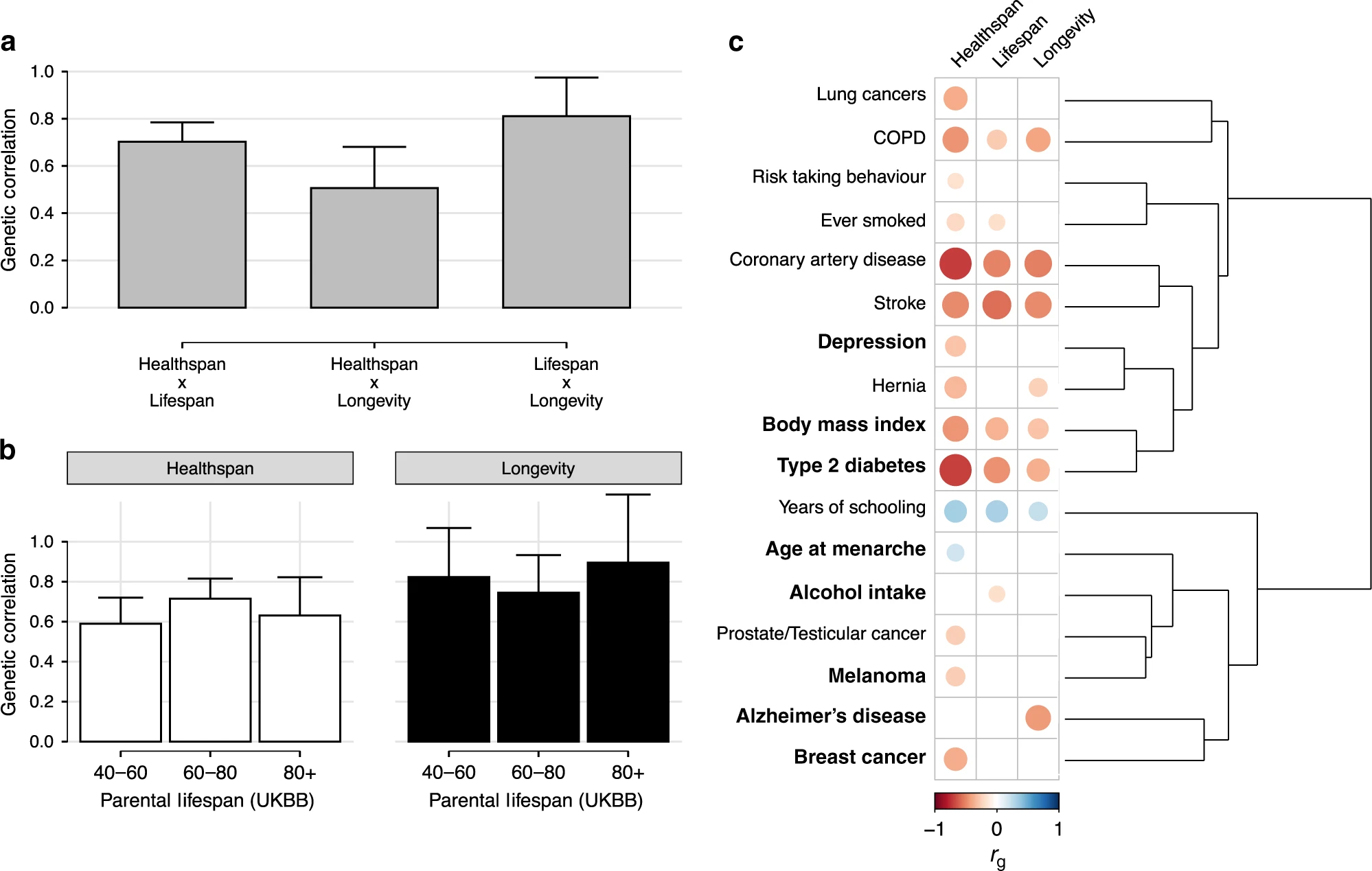
16 July: Scientists, using public biological data on 1.75 m people with known lifespans overall, identify 10 genomic loci which appear to intrinsically influence healthspan, lifespan, and longevity and identify haem metabolism as a promising candidate for further research within the field.

- 16 July – Scientists report to have identified 10 genomic loci which appear to intrinsically influence healthspan, lifespan, and longevity – of which half have not been reported previously at genome-wide significance and most being associated with cardiovascular disease – as well as haem metabolism as a promising candidate for further research within the field. Their study using public biological data on 1.75 m people with known lifespans overall, suggests that haem metabolism may play a role in human ageing and that high levels of iron in the blood likely reduce, and genes involved in metabolising iron likely increase healthy years of life in humans.
- 17 July – Scientists report that yeast cells of the same genetic material and within the same environment age in two distinct ways, describe a biomolecular mechanism that can determine which process dominates during aging and genetically engineer a novel aging route with substantially extended lifespan.
- 19 July
  - The Emirates Mars Mission by the UAE is successfully launched, carrying the Hope probe to Mars, with a scheduled arrival date of February 2021.
  - After a 20-year-long survey, astrophysicists of the Sloan Digital Sky Survey publish the largest, most detailed 3D map of the universe so far, fill a gap of 11 billion years in its expansion history, and provide data which supports the theory of a flat geometry of the universe and confirms that different regions seem to be expanding at different speeds.

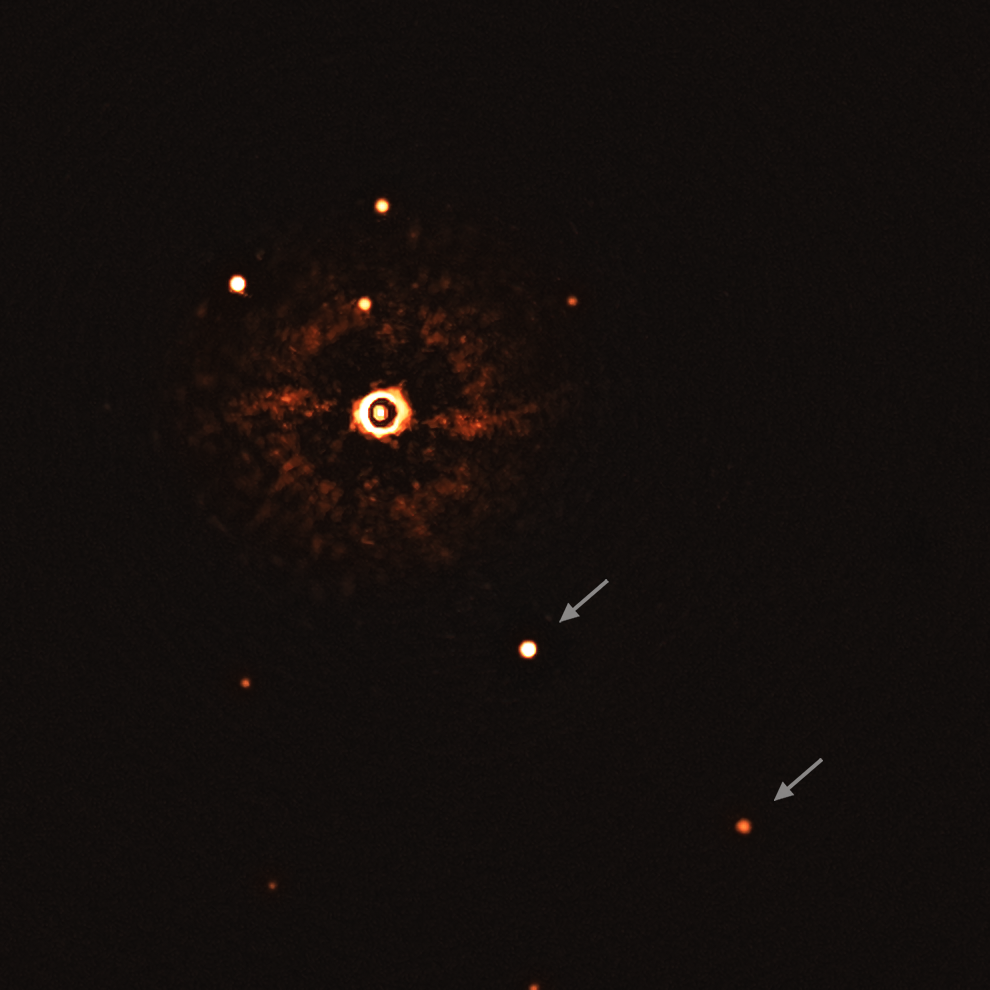
22 July: Astronomers publish the first photo of multiple exoplanets orbiting a sunlike star – TYC 8998-760-1.

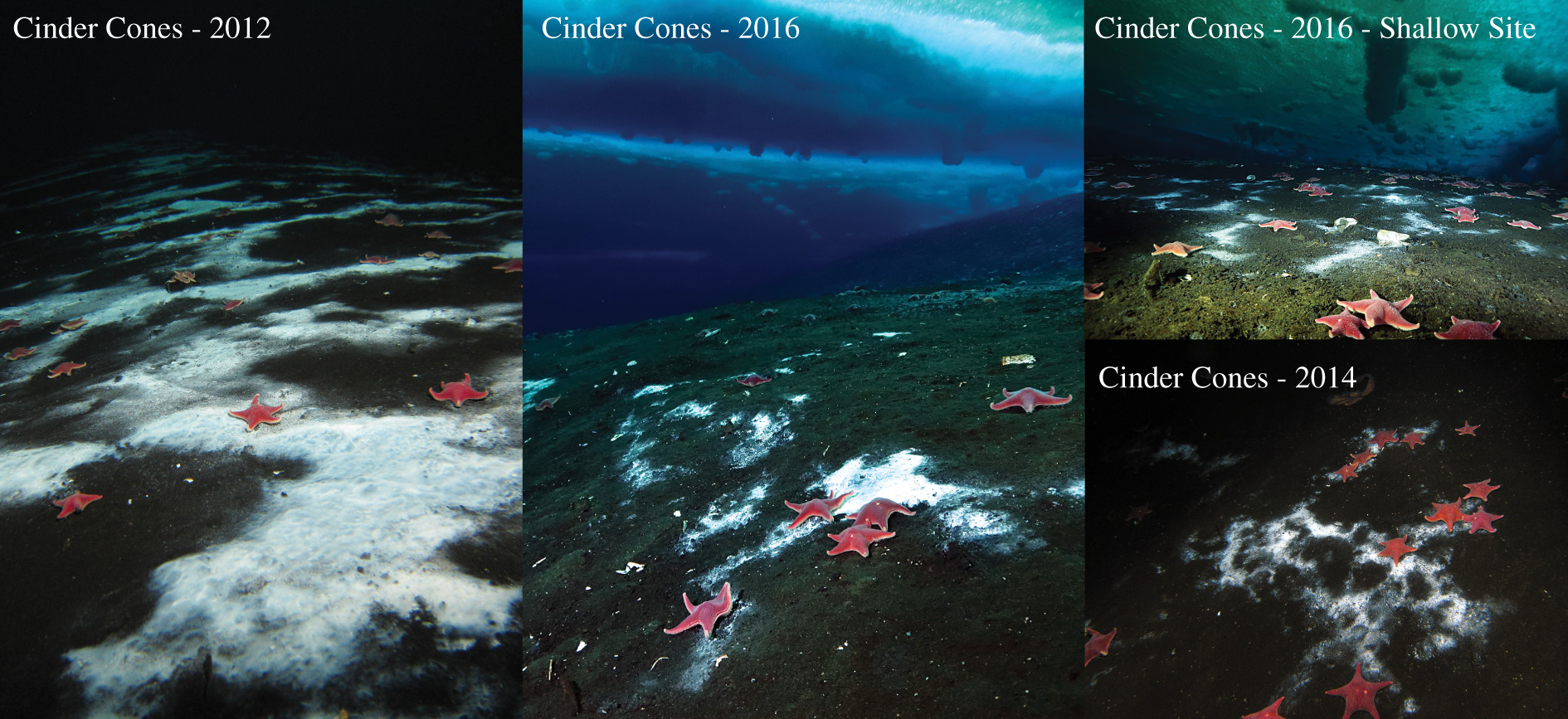
22 July: Scientists confirm the first detected active leak of sea-bed methane in Antarctica.

- 22 July
  - Astronomers publish a photo, for the first time, of multiple exoplanets orbiting a Sunlike star, particularly the star TYC 8998-760-1.
  - Archaeologists report the earliest known evidence of humans in the Americas, dating back 33,000 years, twice the previously oldest known settlement of the continent.
  - Scientists confirm the first detected active leak of sea-bed methane in Antarctica and report that "the rate of microbial succession may have an unrealized impact on greenhouse gas emission from marine methane reservoirs".
  - Researchers report the development of a technique to produce a degradable version of the tough thermoset plastic pDCPD which may also be applicable to other plastics, that aren't part of the ca. 75% of plastics that are recyclable.
  - Scientists report results of a survey of 371 reefs in 58 nations estimating the conservation status of reef sharks globally. No sharks have been observed on almost 20% of the surveyed reefs and shark depletion was strongly associated with both socio-economic conditions and conservation measures. Sharks are considered to be a vital part of the ocean ecosystem.
  - A paper on a "hummingbird-sized dinosaur" conserved in amber published on March 11th is retracted after reviewers agreed with assessments – of which one was uploaded to a preprint server on March 18 – claiming a misclassification of the fossil, believed to be a lizard instead of a dinosaur.
- 23 July
  - China successfully launches Tianwen-1, its first rover mission to Mars, with a planned surface landing date of 23 April 2021.
  - Astronomers report the observation of a "hard tidal disruption event candidate" associated with ASASSN-20hx, located near the nucleus of galaxy NGC 6297, and noted that the observation represented one of the "very few tidal disruption events with hard powerlaw X-ray spectra".
  - Lancaster University researcher Mike Ryder describes the nature and rise of the "robot prosumer", derived from modern-day technology and related participatory culture, that, in turn, was substantially predicted earlier by science fiction writers.
- 24 July – Scientists report the development of an AI-based process using genome databases for evolutionary algorithm-based designing novel proteins. They used deep learning to identify design-rules.
- 27 July – A new AI algorithm by the University of Pittsburgh achieves the highest accuracy to date in identifying prostate cancer, with 98% sensitivity and 97% specificity.

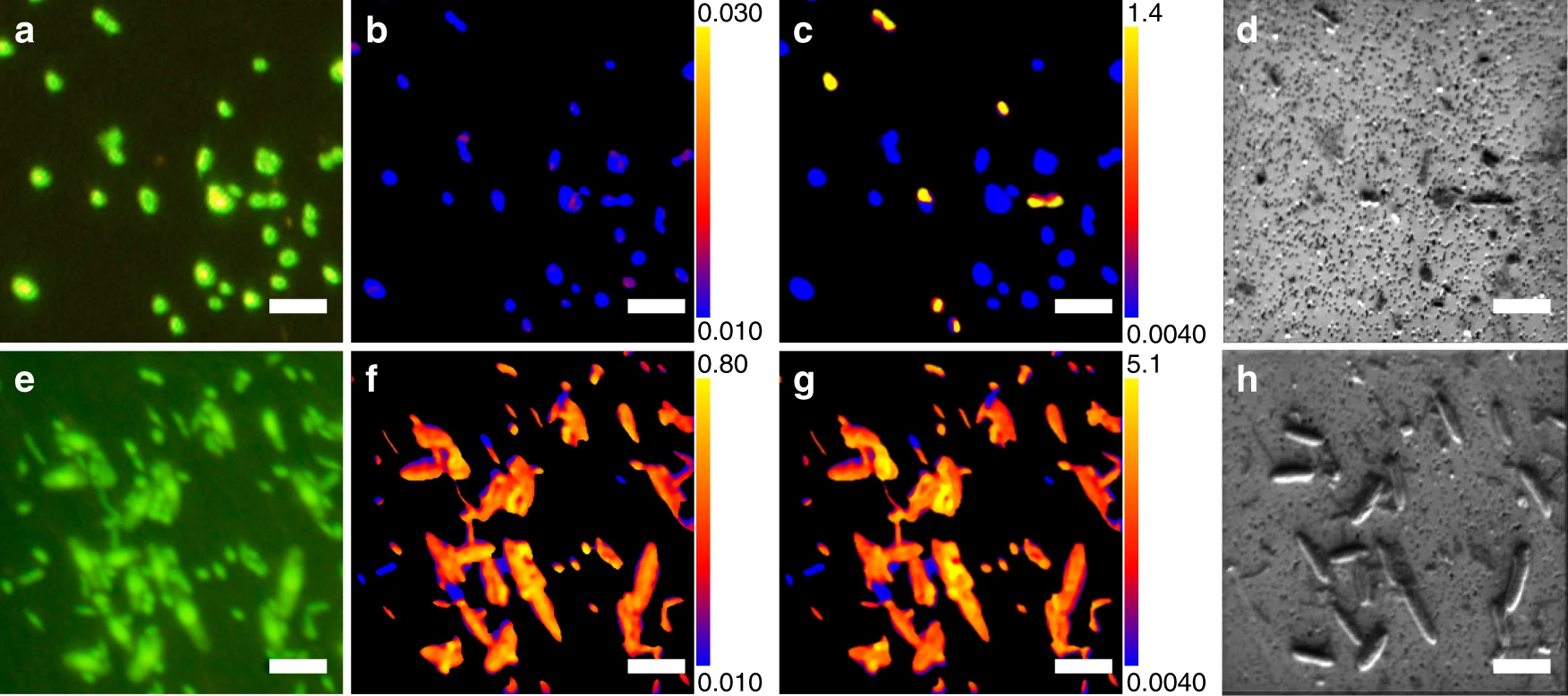
28 July: Marine biologists report that aerobic microorganisms (mainly), in "quasi-suspended animation", were found in organically poor sediments, up to 101.5 million years old, 68.9 metres (226 feet) below the seafloor in the South Pacific Gyre (SPG) ("the deadest spot in the ocean"), and could be the longest-living life forms ever found.

- 28 July
  - Marine biologists report that aerobic microorganisms (mainly), in "quasi-suspended animation", were found in organically poor sediments, up to 101.5 million years old, 68.9 metres (226 feet) below the seafloor in the South Pacific Gyre (SPG) ("the deadest spot in the ocean"), and could be the longest-living life forms ever found.
  - Assembly of the ITER experimental fusion reactor officially begins in France, with a scheduled completion date of 2025.

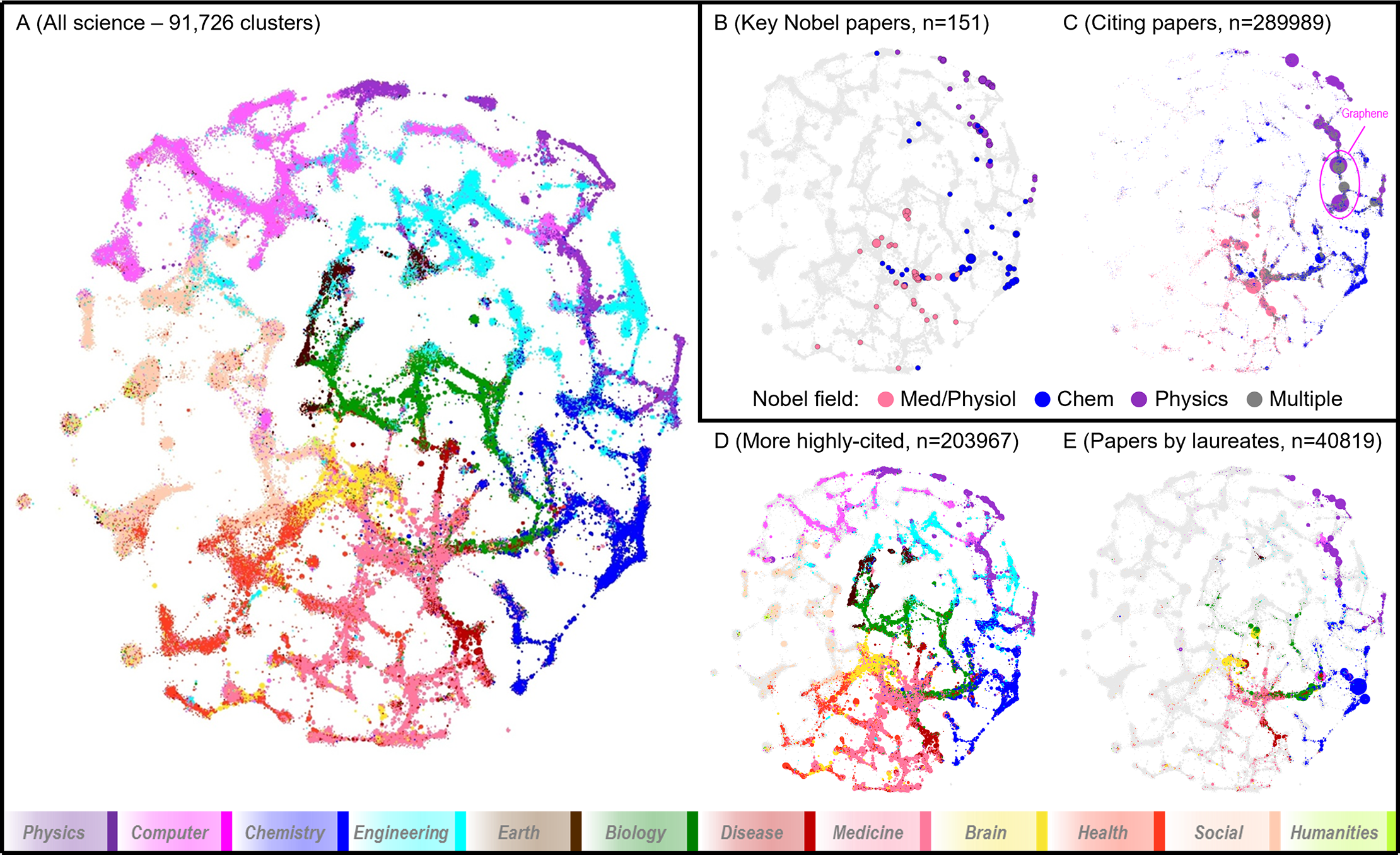
29 July: Scientists report that work honored by the Nobel Prize clusters in only a few scientific fields.

- 29 July
  - Scientists of the NA62 experiment at CERN claim to have presented first evidence of a highly rare process – a decay of a charged kaon – predicted in the Standard Model which may help identifying possible deviations from the model.
  - Scientists report that they have transformed the abundant diamagnetic material known as "fool's gold" and pyrite into a ferromagnetic one by inducing voltage, which may lead to techniques with potential applications for devices such as magnetic data storage ones.
  - Scientists report that work honored by the Nobel Prize clusters in only a few scientific fields with only 36/71 having received at least one Nobel Prize of the 114/849 domains science could be divided into according to their DC2 and DC3 classification systems. Five of the 114 domains were shown to make up over half of the Nobel Prizes awarded 1995–2017 (particle physics [14%], cell biology [12.1%], atomic physics [10.9%], neuroscience [10.1%], molecular chemistry [5.3%]).
  - Scientists report that geochemical data shows that the origin of 50 of the 52 sarsen megaliths used to construct Stonehenge is most likely West Woods, Wiltshire, 25 km north of Stonehenge.
- 30 July – NASA successfully launches its Mars 2020 rover mission to search for signs of ancient life and collect samples for return to Earth. The mission includes technology demonstrations to prepare for future human missions.
- 31 July
  - Two ice caps in Nunavut, Canada have disappeared completely, confirming predictions of a study published in 2017 that they would melt completely within five years.
  - A study suggests a volcanic cause for the Younger Dryas geochemical anomalies in addition to providing further evidence against the Younger Dryas impact hypothesis.

=== August ===
August 2020 in science

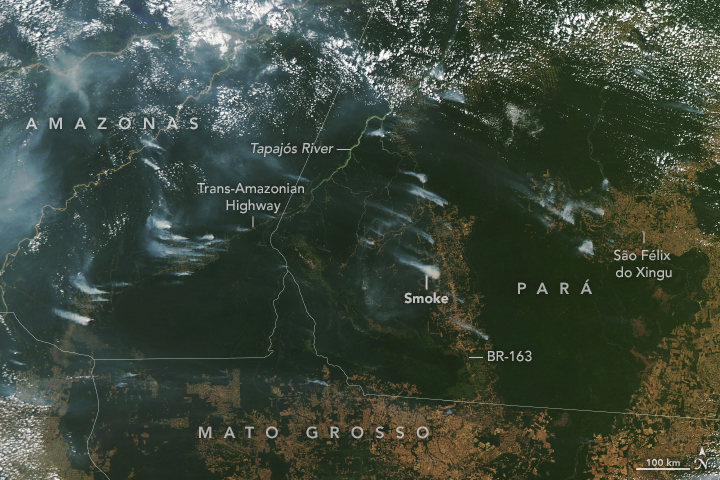
1 August: Brazil's NISR reports that satellite data shows that the number of fires in the Amazon increased by 28% to ~6,800 fires in July compared to the ~5,300 wildfires in July 2019. (Image acquired by MODIS on NASA's Aqua satellite on August 1, 2020.)

- 1 August – Brazil's National Institute for Space Research reports that satellite data shows that the number of fires in the Amazon increased by 28% to ~6,800 fires in July compared to the ~5,300 wildfires in July 2019. This indicates a, potentially worsened, repeat of 2019's accelerated destruction of one of the world's largest protectable buffers against global warming.
- 2 August – Scientists report a newly discovered vulnerability in SARS-CoV-2's spike protein – a positively charged cleavage site near its binding site, which they demonstrate could be exploited by negatively charged molecule that bind to it and thereby inhibit the virus from bonding strongly to the host cell.
- 3 August – Scientists report that valley networks in the southern highlands of Mars may have been formed mostly under glaciers, not free-flowing rivers of water, indicating that early Mars was colder than thought and that extensive glaciation likely occurred in its past.
- 4 August
  - Physicists working on the ATLAS and CMS experiments at the Large Hadron Collider announce new results indicating that the Higgs boson decays into two muons as expected.
  - Astronomers report that self-annihilating dark matter (DM) is not the explanation for the Galactic Center GeV excess (GCE) in the center of the Milky Way galaxy after all, stating: "there is no significant excess in the [GCE] that may be attributed to DM annihilation".
- 5 August
  - The British Antarctic Survey reports that emperor penguin colonies in Antarctica are nearly 20% more numerous than previously thought, with new discoveries made using satellite mapping technology.
  - New Guinea is determined to be the world's most floristically diverse island with well over 13,000 confirmed species of vascular plants recorded thus far, surpassing that of Madagascar.
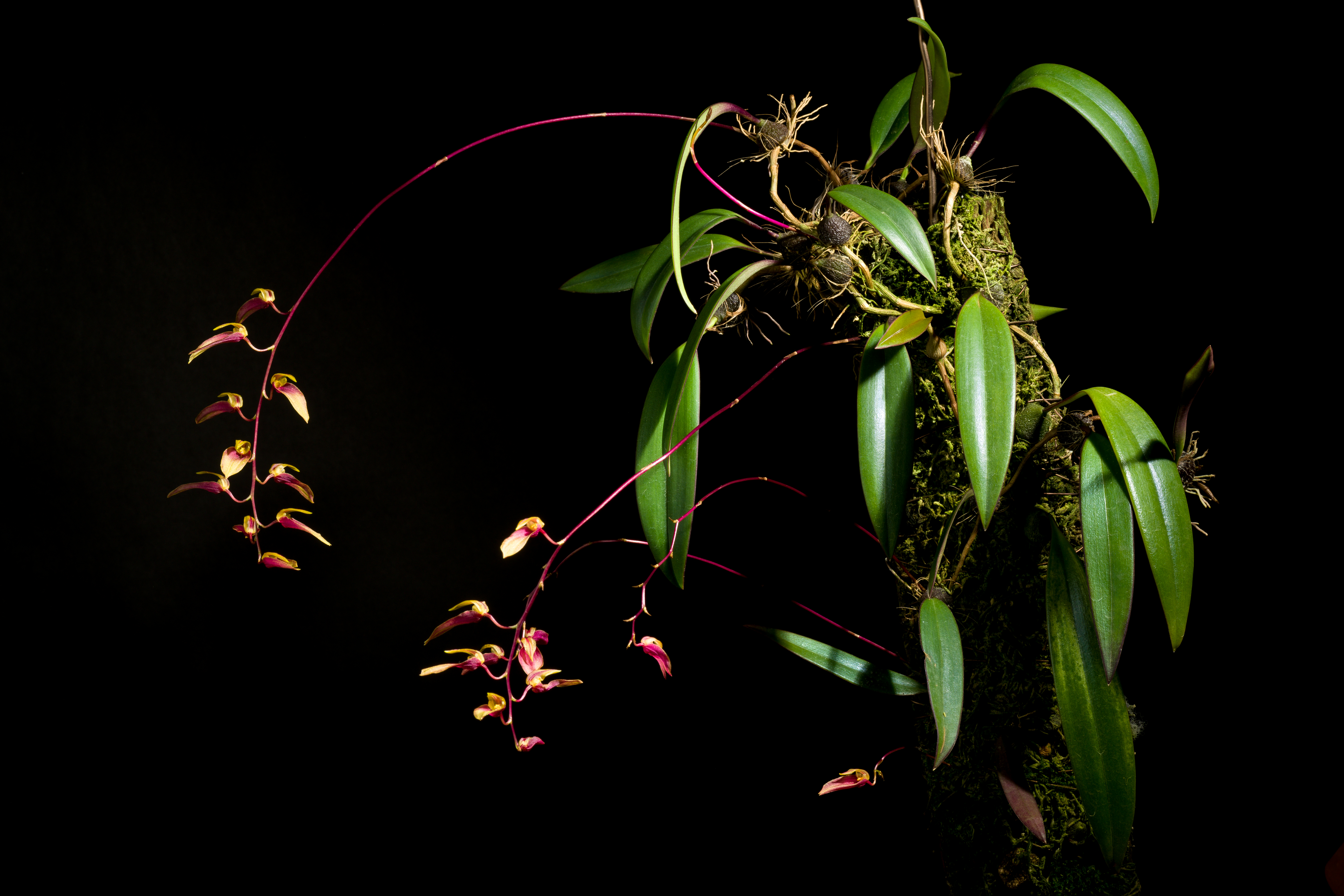
    5 August: The flora of New Guinea - long known the "Last Botanical Frontier" - is thoroughly cataloged by researchers for the first time. Bulbophyllum is the most diverse plant genus in New Guinea with 658 native species, 91% of them endemic.
- 6 August
  - The Canadian Ice Service reports that the Milne Ice Shelf, the last fully intact ice shelf in the Canadian Arctic, has collapsed after losing more than 40% of its area in just two days.
  - Scientists report the creation of the brightest fluorescent solid optical materials so far by enabling the transfer of properties of highly fluorescent dyes via spatial and electronic isolation of the dyes by mixing cationic dyes with anion-binding cyanostar macrocycles. According to a co-author these materials may have applications in areas such as solar energy harvesting, bioimaging, and lasers.
  - Scientists present an extension to an algorithm to infer local genetic relationships published in October 2019 and report that 3% of the Neanderthal genome was introgressed from ancient humans ~200-300kya and predict that 1% of the Denisovan genome was introgressed from an unknown highly diverged, archaic hominin ancestor of which 15% were introgressed into modern humans alive today.
  - Scientists report the discovery of the oldest monkey fossils outside of Africa; particularly, of Mesopithecus pentelicus, about 6.4 million years old, in Yuhane Province, China.
- 7 August
  - A study concludes that the direct effect of the response to the pandemic on global warming will likely be negligible, with an estimated cooling of around 0.01 ±0.005 °C by 2030 and that a well-designed economic recovery could avoid future warming of 0.3 °C by 2050. The study indicates that systemic change for "decarbonization" of humanity's economic structures is required for a substantial impact on global warming.
  - Russia's Roscosmos chief Dmitry Rogozin announces that he wishes for the agency to explore Venus and to bring back surface materials and that they are building a reusable rocket. On 15 September he told reporters that "projects of Venus missions are included in the united government program of Russia's space exploration for 2021-2030" and that they include Venera-D.
- 8 August – NASA announces it will change unofficial and potentially contentious names used by the scientific community for distant cosmic objects and systems including references to NGC 2392 as "the Eskimo Nebula" and NGC 4567 and NGC 4568 as the "Siamese Twins Galaxy".

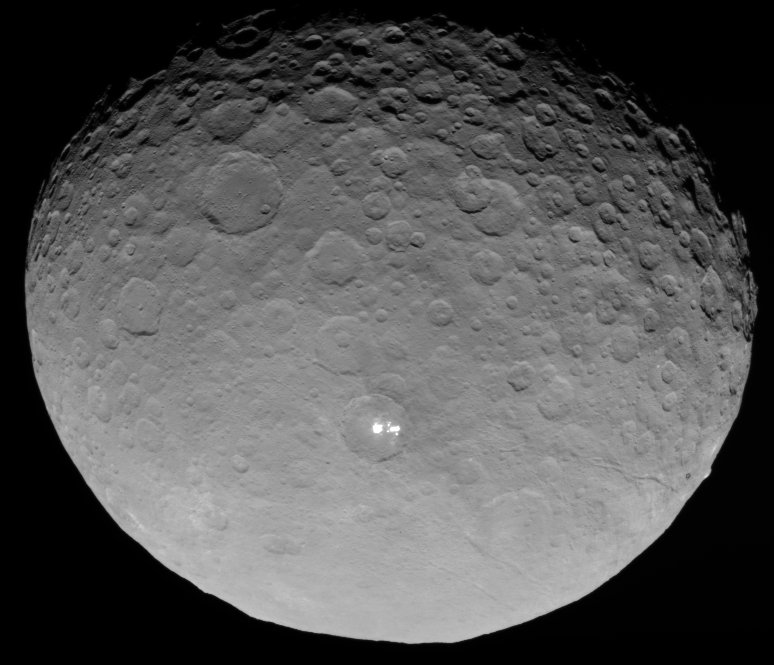
10 August: The dwarf planet Ceres is confirmed to be a water-rich body.

- 10 August
  - The dwarf planet Ceres is confirmed to be a water-rich body, containing a deep reservoir of brine, based on analysis of data from the Dawn mission. The "bright spots" in Occator crater are the result of salty water rising to the surface from below.
  - Scientists report that bi-directional connections, or added appropriate feedback connections, can accelerate and improve communication between and in modular neural networks of the brain's cerebral cortex and lower the threshold for their successful communication.
- 11 August
  - COVID-19 pandemic: Russia's President Vladimir Putin announces that Russia commits the first approval of a COVID-19 vaccine "Gam-COVID-Vac". This is a controversial step due to widely perceived lack of sufficient testing of the vaccine. In November high efficacy in phase III interim results was reported.
  - Astronomers announce the discovery of S4714, a star orbiting the black hole at the center of the Milky Way at up to 8% the speed of light.
- 12 August
  - The latest State of the Climate report finds that 2010 to 2019 was the hottest decade on record globally, with an increase of 0.39 °C (0.7 °F) above the long-term average, and 2019 either the second or third warmest year on record.
  - Scientists report that bacteria that feed on air discovered 2017 in Antarctica are likely not limited to Antarctica after discovering the two genes previously linked to their "atmospheric chemosynthesis" in soil of two other similar cold desert sites, which provides further information on this carbon sink and further strengthens the extremophile evidence that supports the potential existence of microbial life on alien planets.

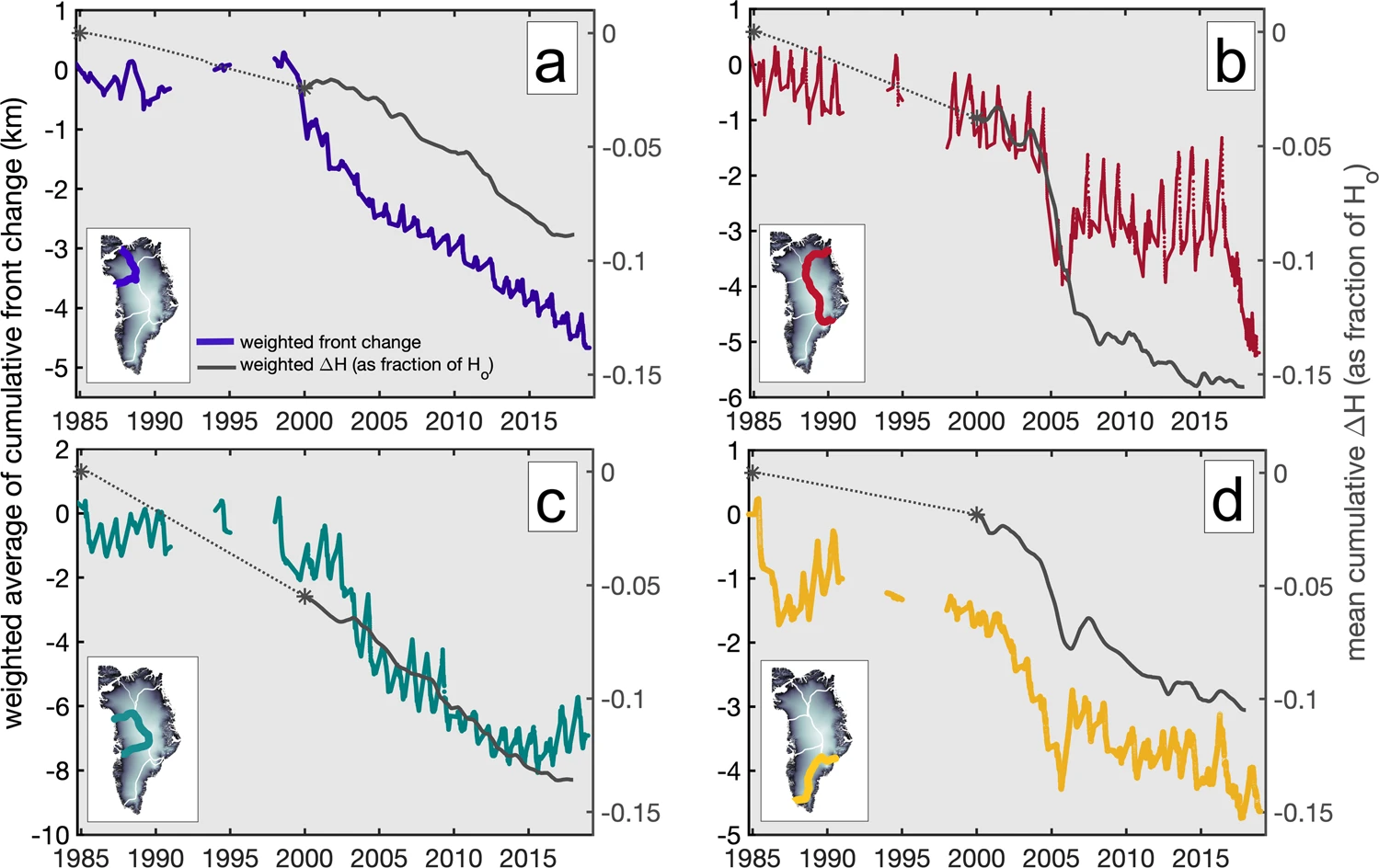
13 August: Melting of the Greenland ice sheet is shown to have passed the point of no return, based on 40 years of satellite data. The switch to a dynamic state of sustained mass loss resulted from widespread retreat in 2000–2005.

- 13 August
  - Scientists at the University of Southern California report the "likely" order of initial symptoms of the COVID-19 disease: "fever, cough, muscle pain, and then nausea, and/or vomiting, and diarrhea".
  - Unexpected dimming of Betelgeuse is explained by NASA as a "traumatic outburst", caused by an immense amount of hot material ejected into space, forming a dust cloud that blocked starlight. On 30 August 2020, astronomers reported the detection of a second dust cloud emitted from Betelgeuse, and associated with a secondary minimum on 3 August in luminosity of the star.
  - Universal coherence protection is reported to have been achieved in a solid-state spin qubit, a modification that allows quantum systems to stay operational (or "coherent") for 10,000 times longer than before.
  - July 2020 is tied as the second-warmest July on record, with a record low Arctic sea ice extent for the month, in a report by the National Oceanic and Atmospheric Administration.
  - Melting of the Greenland ice sheet is shown to have passed the point of no return, based on 40 years of satellite data, by scientists at Ohio State University. The switch to a dynamic state of sustained mass loss resulted from widespread retreat in 2000–2005.
- 14 August – Scientists report the discovery of the oldest grass bedding from at least 200,000 years ago, much older than the oldest previously known bedding. They speculate that insect-repellent plants and ash layers, sometimes due to burned older grass beddings, found beneath the bedding have been used for a dirt-free, insulated base and to keep away arthropods.
- 16 August – Astronomers report the detection of asteroid 2020 QG, a small Earth-crossing near-Earth asteroid of the Apollo group that passed the Earth about 2,950 kilometres (1,830 mi) away, the closest known asteroid to pass the Earth that did not impact the planet.
- 17 August
  - Astronomers report that the interstellar object ʻOumuamua (1I/2017 U1) is not likely to be composed of frozen hydrogen which had been proposed earlier. The compositional nature of the object continues to be unknown. Nonetheless, the possibility that the interstellar object may be alien technology has not been ruled out, although such an explanation is reported to be a "long shot" by "most scientists".
  - Physicists present a study involving interpretations of quantum mechanics that is related to the Schrödinger's cat and Wigner's friend paradoxes, and results in conclusions that challenge seemingly established assumptions about reality and go beyond Bell's theorem.
- 18 August
  - Scientists report that bird skull evolution decelerated compared with the evolution of their dinosaur predecessors after the Cretaceous–Paleogene extinction event, rather than accelerating as often believed to have caused the cranial shape diversity of modern birds.
  - Scientists report the achievement of a milestone in the development of laser-plasma accelerators and demonstrate their longest stable operation of 30 hours. These particle accelerators are far smaller than conventional ones, may have technological applications and may provide a way to energies beyond the LHC.
- 19 August
  - An analysis indicates that sustainable seafood could increase by 36–74% by 2050 compared to current yields and that whether or not these production potentials are realized sustainably depends on factors such as policy reforms, technological innovation and the extent of future shifts in demand.
  - Researchers report that widespread declines in Pacific salmon size resulted in substantial losses to ecosystems and people, which they estimate, and are associated with factors that include climate change and competition with growing numbers of wild and hatchery salmon.
  - Researchers provide explanations for variations in the rate of global mean sea-level rise since 1900 and report that dam building in the 20th century offset factors that would have led to a higher rate during the 1970s, implying that no additional processes are required to explain the observed major variations.

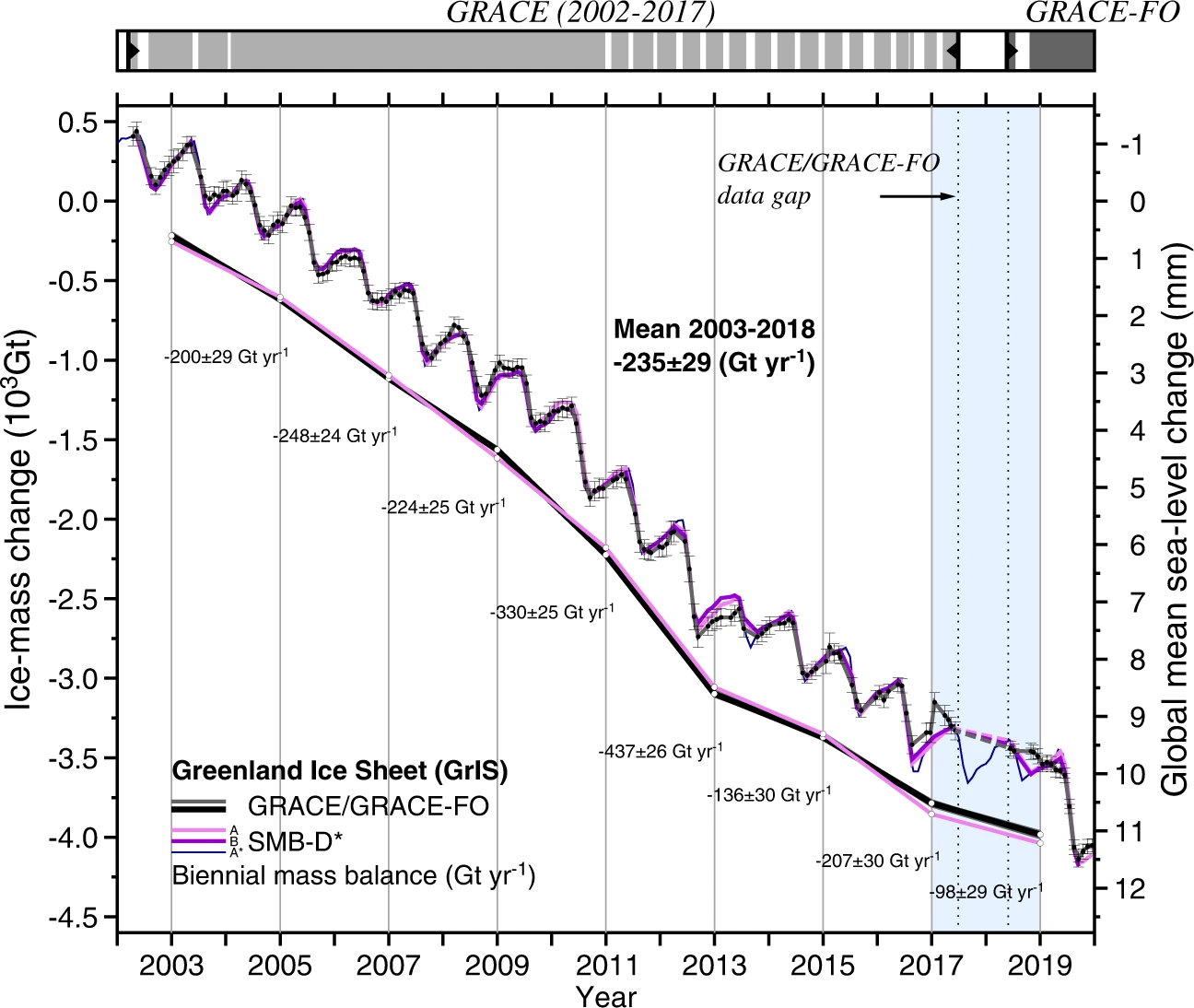
20 August: Scientists report that the Greenland ice sheet lost a record amount of ice during 2019.

- 20 August – Scientists report that the Greenland ice sheet lost a record amount of 532 billion metric tons of ice during 2019, surpassing the old record of 464 billion metric tons in 2012 and returning to high melt rates, and provide explanations for the reduced ice loss in 2017 and 2018.
- 21 August – Scientists, via genomic analysis, identify a large number of mammals that can potentially be infected by SARS-CoV-2 and therefore could possibly become intermediate hosts for the virus.
- 24 August
  - A study finds that almost 300 million people live on tropical forest restoration opportunity land in the Global South, constituting a large share of low-income countries' populations, and argues for prioritized inclusion of "local communities" in forest restoration projects.
  - Researchers assess potential global soil erosion rates by water due to projected climate- and land use-change for multiple SSP-RCP scenarios, indicating that global soil erosion by water may increase 30-66% between 2015 and 2070 and that the greatest increases will occur in areas with tropical climates, which could inform strategies for soil conservation.
- 25 August
  - Astronomers report a significant unexpected increase in density in the space beyond the Solar System as detected by the Voyager 1 and Voyager 2 space probes. According to the researchers, this implies that "the density gradient is a large-scale feature of the VLISM (very local interstellar medium) in the general direction of the heliospheric nose".
  - The National Science Foundation's NOIRLab and the American Astronomical Society release a report from the SATCON1 workshop, which concludes that the effects of large satellite constellations such as Starlink satellites can severely impact some astronomical research efforts and lists six ways to mitigate harm to astronomy.
- 26 August
  - Scientists report that bacteria from Earth, particularly Deinococcus radiodurans, were found to survive for three years in outer space, based on studies on the International Space Station. These findings support the notion of panspermia.
  - Scientists report that ionizing radiation from environmental radioactive materials and cosmic rays may substantially limit the coherence times of qubits if they aren't shielded adequately.
  - Scientists report that the average global temperature of the last ice age, or Last Glacial Maximum, was ~6.1 °C cooler than today and that the equilibrium climate sensitivity was 3.4 °C, consistent with the established consensus range of 2–4.5 °C.
- 27 August
  - Researchers report that sufficient water to fill the oceans may have always been on the Earth since the planet's formation.
  - Scientists report evidence of the hibernation-like state torpor in Lystrosaurus living ~250 Mya in Antarctica – the oldest evidence of a hibernation-like state in a vertebrate animal.
- 28 August
  - Elon Musk reveals a model of the prototype brain–computer interface chip, implanted in pigs, that his company Neuralink has been working on.
  - Scientists describe a way cells – in particular cells of a slime mold and mouse pancreatic cancer–derived cells – are able to navigate efficiently through a body and identify the best routes through complex mazes: generating gradients after breaking down diffused chemoattractants which enable them to sense upcoming maze junctions before reaching them, including around corners.
  - Quantum engineers working for Google report the largest chemical simulation on a quantum computer – a Hartree–Fock approximation with Sycamore paired with a classical computer that analyzed results to provide new parameters for the 12-qubit system.
- 31 August
  - Scientists report that New Guinea singing dogs, known for their characteristic vocalization, are not extinct in the wild as was previously commonly believed after analyzing blood samples of specimens found in highlands of New Guinea.
  - Scientists report that observed ice-sheet losses in Greenland and Antarctica track worst-case scenarios of the IPCC Fifth Assessment Report's sea-level rise projections.

=== September ===
September 2020 in science

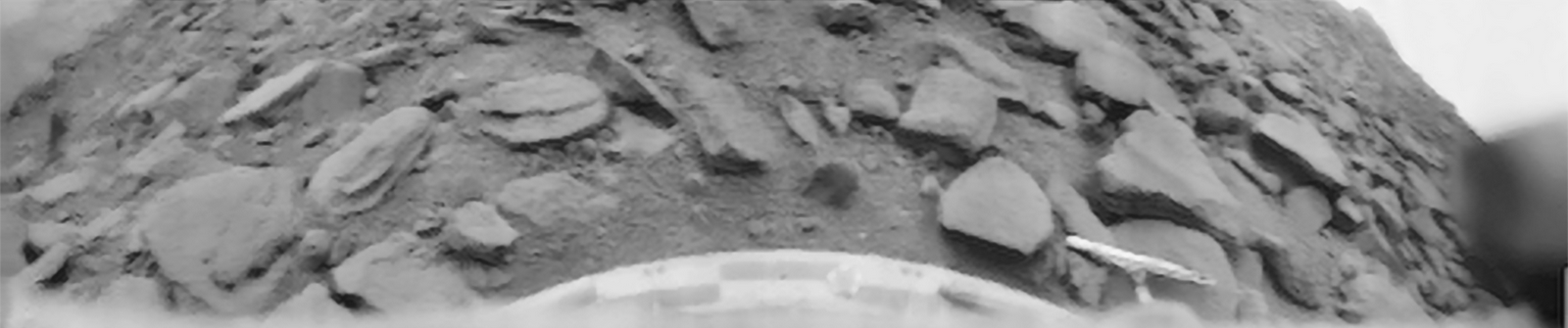
14 September: Scientists announce the detection of phosphine in Venus' atmosphere, which is known to be a strong predictor for the presence of microbial life. (This image is the first received photo sent from the surface of another planet, Venus).

- 1 September
  - A new infrared spectroscopy method capable of 80 million spectra per second, nearly 100 times faster than previous techniques, is reported.
  - A study supports the theory, formalised in 2019, that generic objects of dark energy (GEODEs) formed by stellar collapse of very large, early stars could be the sources of dark energy and are spread throughout the intergalactic medium.
  - After visualizing droplet dispersal for face shields and masks with exhalation valves scientists report that these two types of face coverings can be ineffective against COVID-19 spread and recommend alternatives to minimize viral spread.
  - Researchers report that mining for renewable energy production will increase threats to biodiversity and publish a map of areas that contain needed materials as well as estimations of their overlaps with "Key Biodiversity Areas", "Remaining Wilderness" and "Protected Areas". The authors assess that careful strategic planning is needed.
- 2 September
  - The largest known black hole merger, detected in May 2019, is confirmed, which also provides the first clear evidence of an intermediate-mass black hole. The resulting object, producing a gravitational wave called GW190521, is estimated at 142 solar masses.
  - Researchers in China demonstrate how microplastic pollution contaminates the soil and harms the abundance of common species, such as microarthropods and nematodes, as well as disrupting carbon and nutrient cycling.
  - Researchers present an eight-user city-scale quantum communication network using already deployed fibres without active switching or trusted nodes.
  - Scientists report that asphalt currently is a significant and largely overlooked source of air pollution in urban areas, especially during hot and sunny periods.
- 3 September
  - A study highlights the importance of old bulls in African savannah elephants and, according to the study, raises concerns over the removal of old bulls as currently occurring in both legal trophy hunting and illegal poaching.
  - Scientists announce new experimental evidence for the existence of anyons.
  - Scientists report finding "176 Open Access journals that, through lack of comprehensive and open archives, vanished from the Web between 2000-2019, spanning all major research disciplines and geographic regions of the world" and that in 2019 only about a third of the 14,068 DOAJ-indexed journals ensured the long-term preservation of their content themselves, with many papers not getting archived by initiatives such as the Internet Archive.
- 4 September
  - Scientists publish a map of terrestrial areas where some level of protection or sustainable management as a "Global Safety Net" could achieve various climate and conservation goals.
  - Scientists report that their results indicate that ocean carbon uptake has been underestimated in most ocean models, which may be beneficial in terms of climate change mitigation but problematic in terms of ocean acidification.
  - After investigating how mammalian extinction rates have changed over the past 126,000 years, scientists report that mainly (about 96% prediction accuracy) human population size and/or specific human activities, not climate change, cause global mammal extinctions and predict a near future "rate escalation of unprecedented magnitude".
  - Scientists report the discovery of a nanobody from alpacas, Ty1, with the capacity to block SARS-CoV-2 from entering human cells in vitro due to targeting its receptor binding domain, blocking it from binding with ACE2.
- 7 September
  - Scientists report that a low-frequency radio emissions SETI survey of the Vela region, known to include at least 10 million stars, did not discover any active signalling of extraterrestrial intelligence. It has been described as the deepest and broadest such search at low frequencies to date.
  - A scientific review by German and Luxembourgian NGOs shows that electromagnetic radiation – such as mobile phone and Wi-Fi radiation – likely has a negative impact on, declining, insects, with 72 of 83 analyzed studies finding an effect.
  - Researchers report the magnitudes of climate change mitigation effects of shifting global food production and consumption to plant-based diets which are mainly composed of foods that require only a small fraction of the land and CO_{2} emissions required for meat and dairy. They conclude that such changes could offset CO_{2} emissions equal to the past 9 to 16 years of fossil fuel emissions in nations, they grouped into 4 types, and provide a map of regional opportunities.
- 8 September
  - Scientists in northern India report the discovery of the fossil molar tooth of a new extinct species, and oldest known ancestor of gibbons, named Kapi ramnagarensis, that lived about 13 million years ago. This reportedly closes a major gap in the hominoid fossil record and shows that gibbons migrated to Asia at least five million years earlier than thought previously.
  - Scientists report that suppressing activin type 2 receptors-signalling proteins myostatin and activin A via activin A/myostatin inhibitor ACVR2B – tested preliminarily in humans in the form of ACE-031 in the 2010s – can protect against both muscle and bone loss in mice. The mice were sent to the International Space Station and could largely maintain their muscle weights – about twice those of wild type due to genetic engineering for targeted deletion of the myostatin gene – under microgravity.
  - Scientists report the oldest Neanderthal specimen in Central-Eastern Europe, found in the Stajnia Cave. A ~80,000 years old tooth dated via mtDNA shows that at a time of environmental changes Neanderthals most related to those of Northern Caucasus moved farther from their southern home areas than previously known.
  - The European Environment Agency reports that environmental factors such as air pollution and heatwaves contributed to around 13% of all human deaths in EU countries in 2012 (~630,000).
- 9 September
  - The WMO publishes a high-level brief compilation of the latest climate science information from the WMO, GCP, UNESCO-IOC, IPCC, UNEP and the Met Office. The report, which is not published under an open license, is subdivided into 7 chapters which each have a list of key messages.
  - Scientists explain a mechanism by which C. elegans learns and inherits pathogenic avoidance after exposure to a single non-coding RNA of a bacterial pathogen.
- 10 September
  - Scientists show that "immediate efforts, consistent with the broader sustainability agenda but of unprecedented ambition and coordination, could enable the provision of food for the growing human population while reversing the global terrestrial biodiversity trends caused by habitat conversion" and recommend measures such as addressing drivers of land-use change, and for increasing the extent of land under conservation management and shares of plant-based diets.
  - The latest report of the Living Planet Index (LPI) finds that, based on more than 4,000 tracked vertebrate species' population sizes, vertebrates have declined by 68% between 1970 and 2016, with increasing deforestation and agricultural expansion being key drivers and the largest decline of 94% in the LPI occurring in the tropical subregions of the Americas.
- 11 September
  - Scientists publish a continuous, high-fidelity record of variations in Earth's climate during the past 66 million years and identify four climate states, separated by transitions that include changing greenhouse gas levels and polar ice sheets volumes.
  - Scientists report that results of cold dark matter simulations – probability of strong gravitational lensing events due to dark-matter distributions in 11 galaxy clusters – based on current theories are substantially inconsistent with observational data.
  - INPE reports that 1,359 km^{2} of the Brazilian Amazon have burned off in August, which may put the effectiveness of the contemporary response against the deforestation – such as considerations of economic interventions and the current military operation – into question. On 13 September preliminary data based on satellite images, indicate that 1.5 million hectares have burned in the Pantanal region since the start of August, surpassing the previous fire season record from 2005. On September 15 it was reported that 23,500 km^{2} – ~12% of the Pantanal – have burned off in 2020. The 6,087 km^{2} of lost rainforest in 2020 as of early September – ~95% of the period in 2019 – is about the size of Palestine.
- 14 September
  - The Royal Astronomical Society announces the detection of phosphine in Venus' atmosphere, which, in the discovered concentration, is known to be a strong predictor for the presence of microbial life. Researchers suggest that the gas, if indeed present on the planet, could have possibly resulted from to date unexplained abiotic chemical, atmospheric or geologic processes or constitute a biosignature.
  - The first proof-of-concept exploit for the Windows Server vulnerability called Zerologon (CVE-2020-1472) for which a patch exists since August is published. Some federal agencies using the software have been ordered to install the patch. The exploit was later used in the 2020 United States federal government data breach.
- 15 September
  - For the first time in its 175-year history, Scientific American endorses a presidential candidate, Joe Biden.
  - Analysis from NASA and NOAA confirms that solar cycle 25 has begun and confirms the start of the solar cycle to be December 2019, the time of a solar minimum. Solar cycle 24 lasted an average length of 11 years.

18 September: Astronomers report evidence of an exoplanet located in the Whirlpool Galaxy.

- 16 September
  - Astronomers report the discovery, for the first time, of a massive Jupiter-sized planet in close orbit around a white dwarf. The latter object, WD 1856+534, is the left-over remnant of an earlier much larger Sun-like star.
  - A genetic analysis of more than 400 skeletons buried as Vikings provides a clearer picture of the Viking Age in Europe and Viking ancestry, showing i.a. that local people of Scotland were buried as Vikings and may have taken on Viking identities, that the contemporary United Kingdom's population has up to 6% Viking DNA and that "many Viking Age individuals — both within and outside Scandinavia — have high levels of non-Scandinavian ancestry".
  - Scientists identify a major extinction event 233 Mya, during the Carnian Pluvial Episode, and report that it triggered radiations of many key groups that dominate modern ecosystems as well as dinosaurs.
- 18 September
  - Astronomers identify 24 superhabitable planet – planets better suited for life than Earth – contenders, from among more than 4000 confirmed exoplanets at present, based on astrophysical parameters, as well as the natural history of known life forms on the Earth.
  - Astronomers report evidence, for the first time, of an extragalactic planet, M51-ULS-1b, an exoplanet outside the Milky Way Galaxy which was detected by eclipsing a bright X-ray source (XRS) in the Whirlpool Galaxy (M51a).
  - Researchers report the development of two active guide RNA-only elements that, according to their study, may enable halting or deleting gene drives introduced into populations in the wild with CRISPR-Cas9 gene editing. The paper's senior author cautions that the two neutralizing systems they demonstrated in cage trials "should not be used with a false sense of security for field-implemented gene drives".
  - Media reports of what may be the first publicly confirmed case of a, civilian, fatality as a nearly direct consequence of a cyberattack, after ransomware disrupted a hospital in Germany.
  - Scientists report the likely oldest securely dated evidence for Homo sapiens in the Arabian Peninsula – ~120,000 year-old footprints of two or three human individuals visiting a lake.
- 21 September
  - Evidence is presented of solid-state water in the interstellar medium, and particularly, of water ice mixed with silicate grains in cosmic dust grains.
  - Researchers report the achievement of quantum entanglement between the motion of a millimetre-sized mechanical oscillator and a disparate distant spin system of a cloud of atoms.
- 22 September – Researchers report that over half of endangered species' proposed recovery plan budgets are allocated to research and monitoring (R&M), that species with higher proportions of such budgets have poorer recovery outcomes and provide recommendations for ensuring that "conservation programs emphasize action or [R&M] that directly informs action".
- 23 September
  - Scientists report the re-classification of fossils to a new species they call Gnathomortis stadtmani, a very large sea-faring lizard that lived about 80 million years ago.
  - Scientists publish new findings and data about the supermassive black hole M87*, including a video of the black hole based on data not sufficient for images, using statistical modeling about changes in its appearance in 2009–2017, showing variations of its orientation and a wobbling ring – constituting the "first glimpse of the dynamical structure of the accretion flow so close to the black hole's event horizon".
- 24 September – Researchers report that 13.7% of blood samples from 987 individuals with severe COVID-19 contained "auto-antibodies" against the patients' own type I interferons.
- 25 September
  - Chemists describe, for the first time, possible chemical pathways from nonliving prebiotic chemicals to complex biochemicals that could give rise to living organisms, based on a new, freely available, computer program named ALLCHEMY.
  - Scientists report the first ever measurements, made via China's Chang'e 4 lander, of the radiation exposure – a known risk to astronauts – on the lunar surface.
  - Scientists report that carrion crows show a neuronal response that correlates with their perception of a stimulus, which they argue to be an empirical marker of (avian/corvid) sensory consciousness – the conscious perception of sensory input – in the crows which do not have a cerebral cortex. A related study, published on the same day, shows that the birds' pallium's neuroarchitecture is reminiscent of the mammalian cortex.
  - Scientists report with a preprint that reanalysis of LMNS in-situ-based data of around 1980 supports the presence of phosphine on Venus, reported on 14 September. Their data-analysis found a phosphorus signal that fits to phosphine in data gathered with the probe the NASA spacecraft "Pioneer" dropped down to Venus to measure the chemistry of its clouds.
- 28 September
  - Scientists confirm the existence of several large saltwater lakes under the ice in the south polar region of the planet Mars. According to one of the researchers, "We identified the same body of water [as suggested earlier in a preliminary initial detection], but we also found three other bodies of water around the main one ... It's a complex system."
  - Scientists warn that an "international effort is needed to manage a changing fire regime in the vulnerable Arctic", reporting that satellite data shows how the Arctic fire regime is changing. On 3 September EU institutions reported that, according to satellite data, the Arctic fires already far surpassed the total of CO_{2} emissions for the 2019 season.
  - Biotechnologists report the genetically engineered refinement and mechanical description of synergistic enzymes – PETase, first discovered in 2016, and MHETase of Ideonella sakaiensis – for faster depolymerization of PET as well as of PEF, which may be useful for depollution, recycling and upcycling of mixed plastics.
- 29 September
  - Astronomers using microlensing techniques report the detection, for the first time, of an earth-mass rogue planet (named OGLE-2016-BLG-1928) unbounded by any star, and free floating in the Milky Way galaxy.
  - Scientists report that they expect construction of the experimental SPARC experimental fusion reactor to begin in 2021 and take four years to complete, and, with seven studies, that it is "very likely" to work.
  - Researchers report the discovery of the Patient Zero genome of the COVID-19 virus based on data analysis.
- 30 September
  - Scientists reaffirm that the first-ever found feather fossil from a dinosaur, about 150 million years old and discovered in 1861, belonged to Archaeopteryx lithographica.
  - A new graphene-based bolometer with a claimed 100,000 times higher sensitivity than previous instruments is demonstrated.

=== October ===
Science Summary for this section (October)

- 1 October
  - Researchers report the discovery of a novel overlapping gene (OLG) (a gene partially overlapping with a sequence of another gene), named ORF3d, in the SARS-CoV-2 genome, that may be a factor in the SARS-CoV-2 pandemic. They found the gene has been identified before, but only in a variant of coronavirus that infects pangolins.
  - Astronomers announce spectroscopic confirmation of a web-like structure containing galaxies and dark matter around, and likely fueling, a quasar at an age of the Universe of 0.9 bn years, which contributes to an explanation of how such supermassive black holes could have grown rapidly so early.
- 2 October – A rippling graphene-based Brownian ratchet-related energy-harvesting circuit with the potential to deliver "clean, limitless, low-voltage power for small devices" if adequately incorporated into a chip is demonstrated.
- 5 October
  - The 2020 Nobel Prize in Medicine is awarded to Harvey J. Alter, Michael Houghton and Charles M. Rice for their work on the hepatitis C virus.
  - Scientists announce the first global estimate of sea-floor microplastics: 14 million tonnes of microplastic on the ocean floor in terms of overall weight. Their estimate was created by averaging the microplastic mass per cm^{3}, is about double their estimate using earlier data and 1-1.7 times the amount of plastic thought to annually enter the oceans as of 2015.
- 6 October
  - The 2020 Nobel Prize in Physics is awarded to Roger Penrose, Reinhard Genzel and Andrea Ghez for their work on black holes.
  - Scientists report the direct visualization of neuronal tissue of extraordinarily well-preserved ≈2,000 years-old human neuronal tissue – whose discovery was reported in January – of a victim of the eruption of Mount Vesuvius in Italy, vitrified by hot ash.

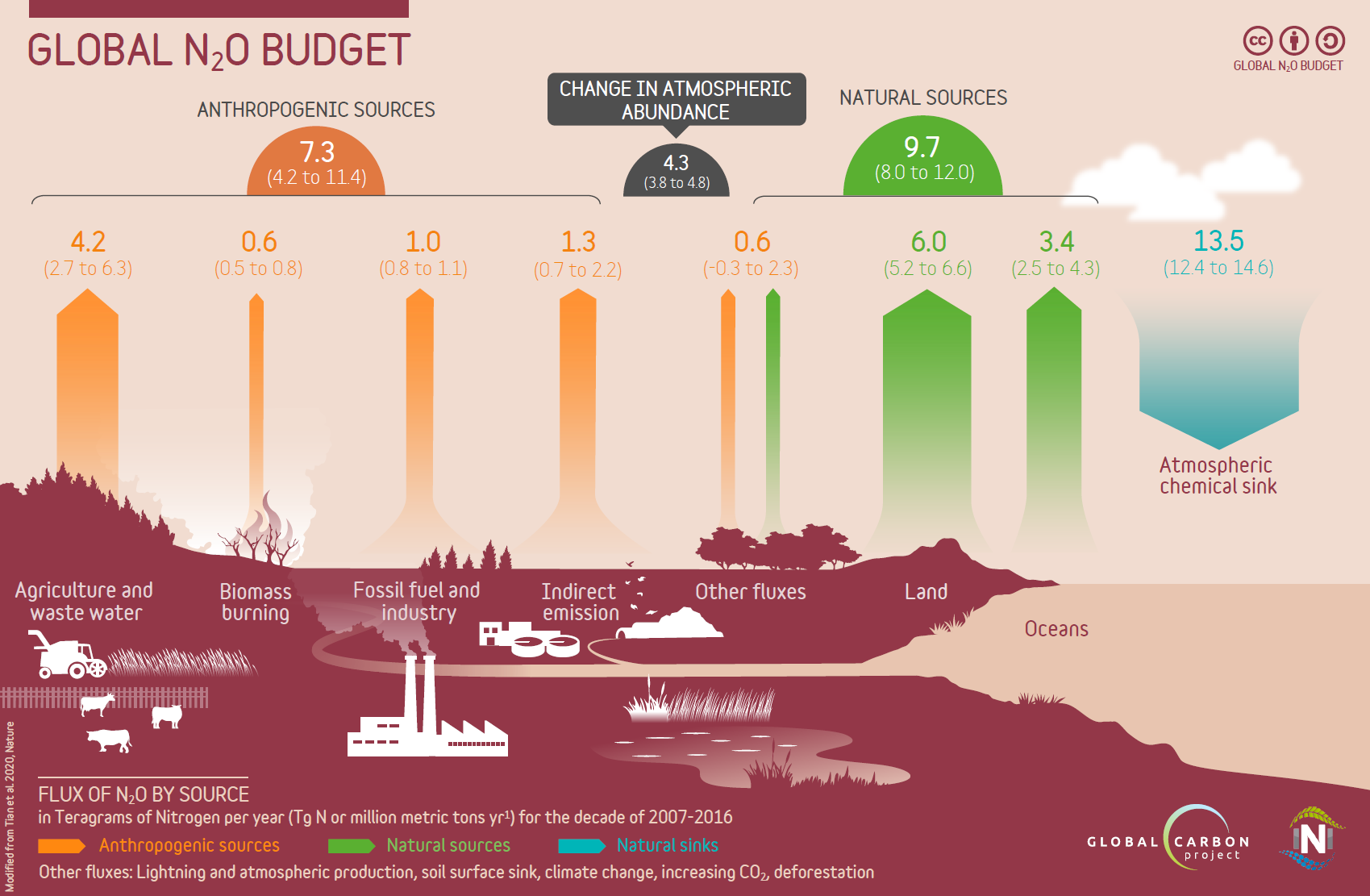
7 October: A quantification of global N_{2}O sources and sinks.

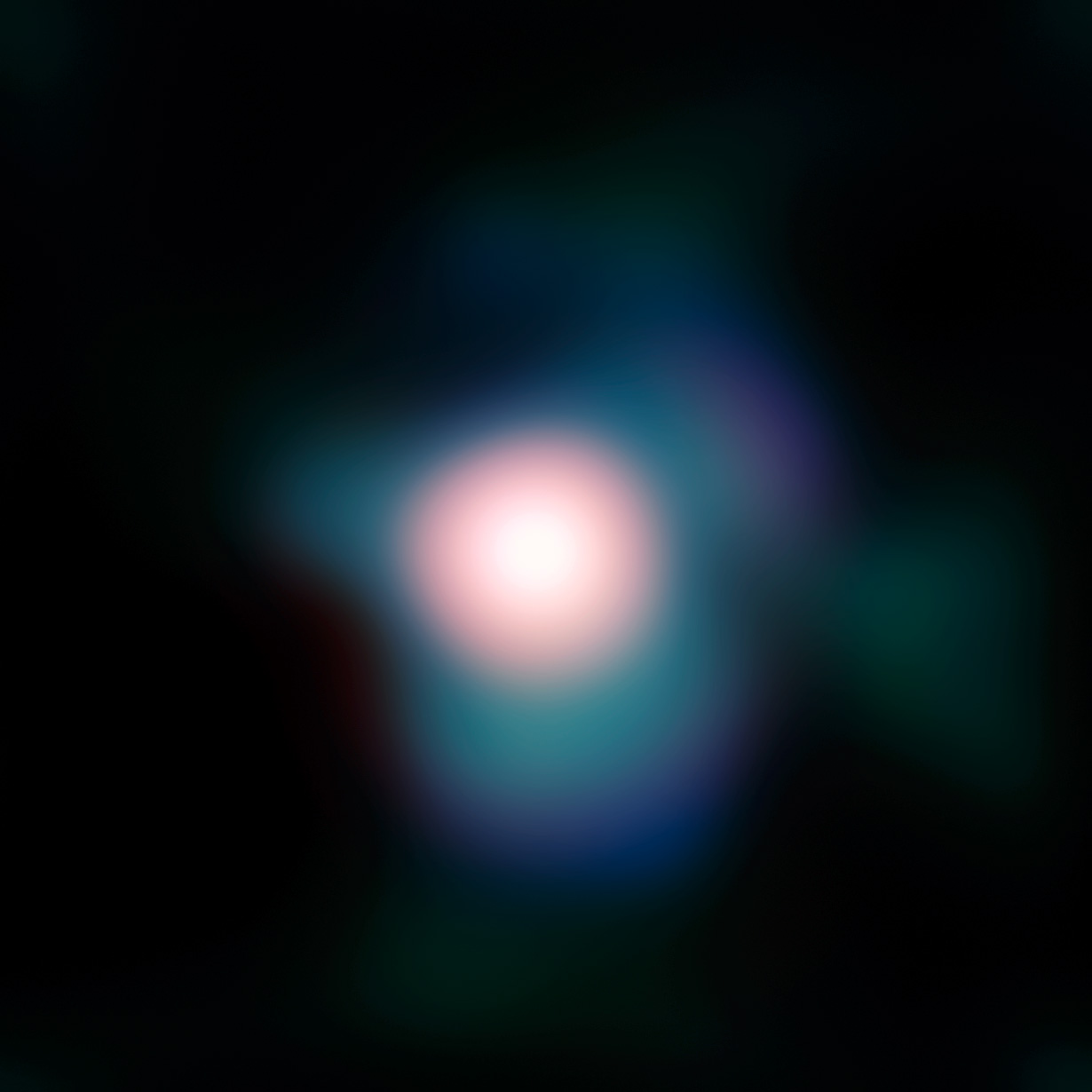
13 October: Betelgeuse is shown to be 25% smaller and closer than previously thought.

- 7 October
  - The 2020 Nobel Prize in Chemistry is awarded to Emmanuelle Charpentier and Jennifer A. Doudna for their work on genome editing.
  - Researchers reveal a new high-temperature superconducting cable, named VIPER, capable of sustaining higher levels of electric current and magnetic fields than previously possible.
  - Researchers demonstrate the first passive radiative device that absorbs heat from the hotter inside of an enclosure and emits it on the outside. The system has potential to cool vehicle and building interiors, and solar cells, without using electricity.
  - Medical researchers conclude the SARS-CoV-2 can remain on common surfaces for up to 28 days in laboratory conditions that include darkness.
  - Scientists present a comprehensive quantification of global sources and sinks of the greenhouse gas N_{2}O and report that human-induced emissions increased by 30% over the past four decades and is the main cause of the increase in atmospheric concentrations, with recent growth exceeding some of the highest projected IPCC emission scenarios.
- 8 October
  - In an unprecedented move, all 34 editors of top medical journal, The New England Journal of Medicine, condemn President Trump's handling of the COVID-19 pandemic.
  - Scientists release the largest and most detailed 3D maps of the Universe, called "PS1-STRM". The data of the MAST was created using neural networks and combines data from the Sloan Digital Sky Survey and others. Users can query the dataset online or download it in its entirety of ≈300GB.
- 12 October – Medical scientists report, for the first time in the U.S. and fifth worldwide, confirming evidence of reinfection with the SARS-CoV-2.
- 13 October
  - The red supergiant star Betelgeuse is shown to be 530 light years away, about 25% closer than previously thought. Additionally, its estimated size is revised downwards, from the semi-major axis of Jupiter to around two-thirds of this diameter.
  - Scientists report in a preprint the possible detection of glycine in the atmosphere of Venus with the ALMA radio telescope. The amino acid may be relevant to the origin of life and was found on meteorites earlier.
  - On 15 October BepiColombo conducts a fly-by of Venus, having instruments possibly sensitive enough to detect the gas, without a detection or non-detection being declared by 10 November.
  - A data analysis released as a preprint on 19 October shows no statistical evidence for an apparent detection of phosphine in the atmosphere of Venus reported in September and that "at least a handful of spurious features" which can be obtained with the data processing method that was used in the study.
  - On 27 October scientists release a preprint according to which the detection via JCMT can be explained by the presence of other gases and the ALMA interferometric data is invalid due to calibration issues of the used data processing scripts. Independent processing of the ALMA data by several teams varied from the original study's authors'. They also claim to have found an inconsistency between the proposed photochemical model and data about the altitude of the gas in the original study.
  - On the same day, other researchers publish a paper according to which no phosphine was discovered between 2012 and 2015 at the cloud tops and the lower mesosphere above, putting an upper limit of PH_{3} abundance there.
  - On 28 October science journalists reported that ESO ALMA scientists found separate, unspecified issues – later reported to be a calibration error that was found as a result of the study "No phosphine in the atmosphere of Venus" – with the data that was used by authors of the study that claimed an apparent detection of phosphine in September, and took those data off the observatory's public archive so that the European ALMA Regional Centre Network, who originally calibrated the data, scrutinises it in detail and reprocesses it.

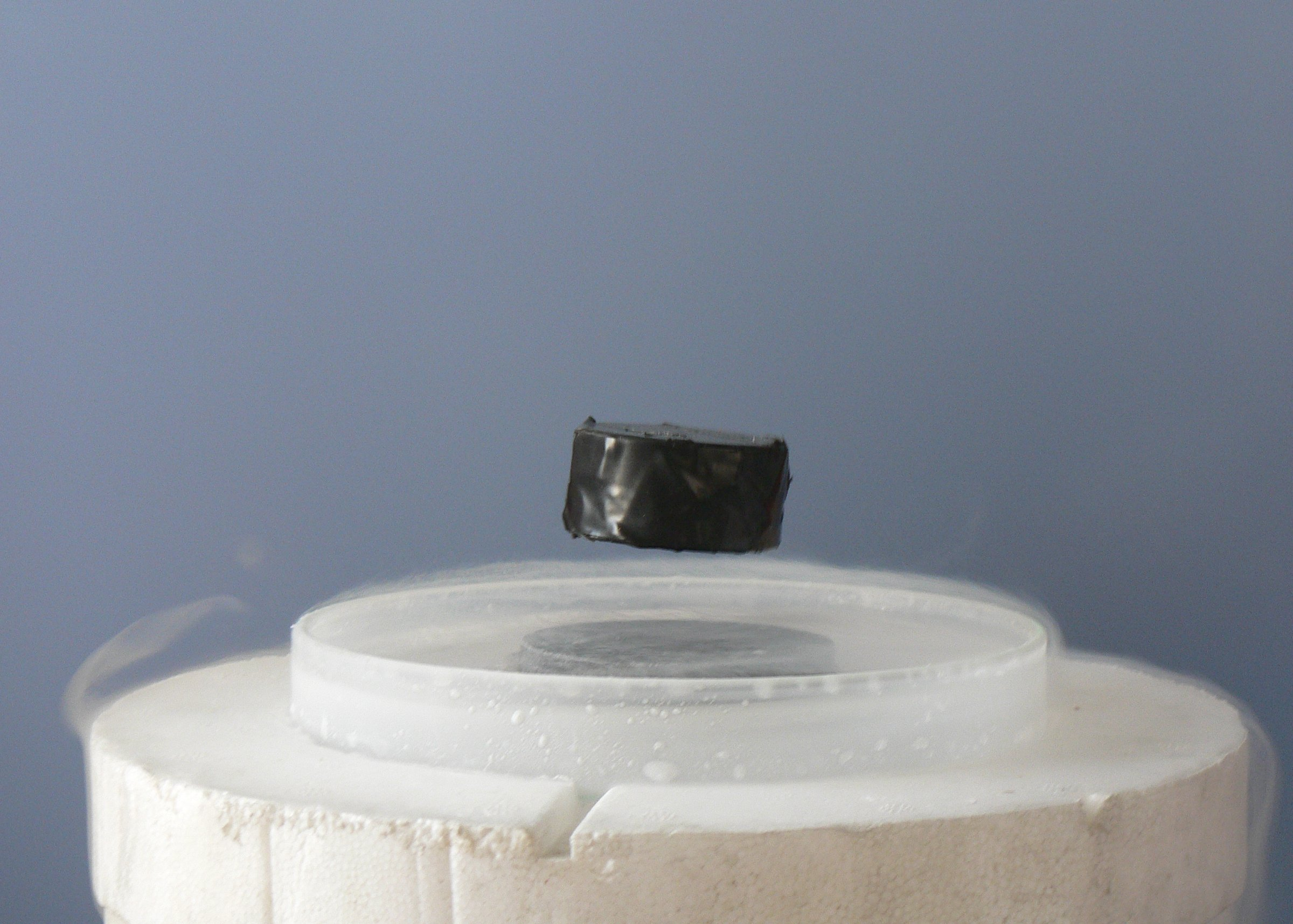
14 October: Room-temperature superconductivity is demonstrated at 15°C, an improvement of 35°C on the previous record. Report is not reliable (retracted article).The image shows a magnet levitating over a superconductor

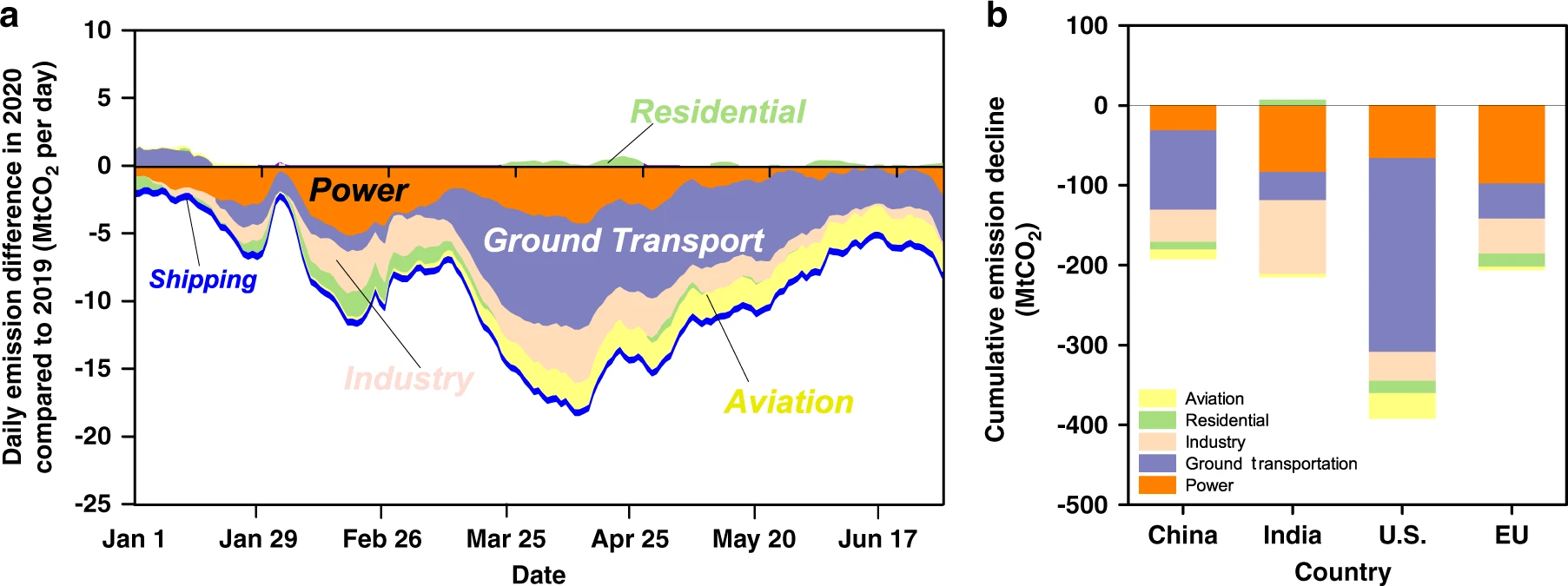
14 October: A study shows the impact of the C19-pandemic in global CO_{2} emissions.

- 14 October
  - A multicriteria optimization shows restoration of degraded terrestrial ecosystems to be up to 13 times more cost-effective when applied in prioritized locations, with major improvements in terms of biodiversity and climate goals, at low cost. Their estimated cost-benefit ratio is based on contemporary assignments of value for labor, material input, and yield losses – such as of beef – on the costs-side and biodiversity conservation, local nature benefits, poverty-reduction, and climate-stabilization on the benefits-side. They note that gains are highest when restoration is combined with protection of remaining ecosystems.
  - Report that a high pressure room-temperature superconductor able to work at 15 °C is demonstrated by the University of Rochester. Although requiring 260 GPa (2.6 million times the atmospheric pressure), this new compound of hydrogen, carbon and sulfur is a 35 °C improvement on the previous record. In 2022 the article was retracted by Nature journal editorial board due to a non standard, user-defined data analysis calling into question the scientific validity of the claim.
  - A study reports major shifts in the colony size structure – the demographics – of the Great Barrier Reef's coral populations compared to 1995/1996. The reef is known to have lost more than half of its overall coral cover since then.
  - Researchers report that antibiotic resistance genes can spread into bacterial populations without the respective selection pressure via horizontal gene transfer.
  - Scientists report, based on near-real-time activity data, an 'unprecedented' abrupt 8.8% decrease in global CO_{2} emissions in the first half of 2020 compared to the same period in 2019, larger than during previous economic downturns and World War II. Authors note that such decreases of human activities "cannot be the answer" and that structural and transformational changes in human economic management and behaviour systems are needed.

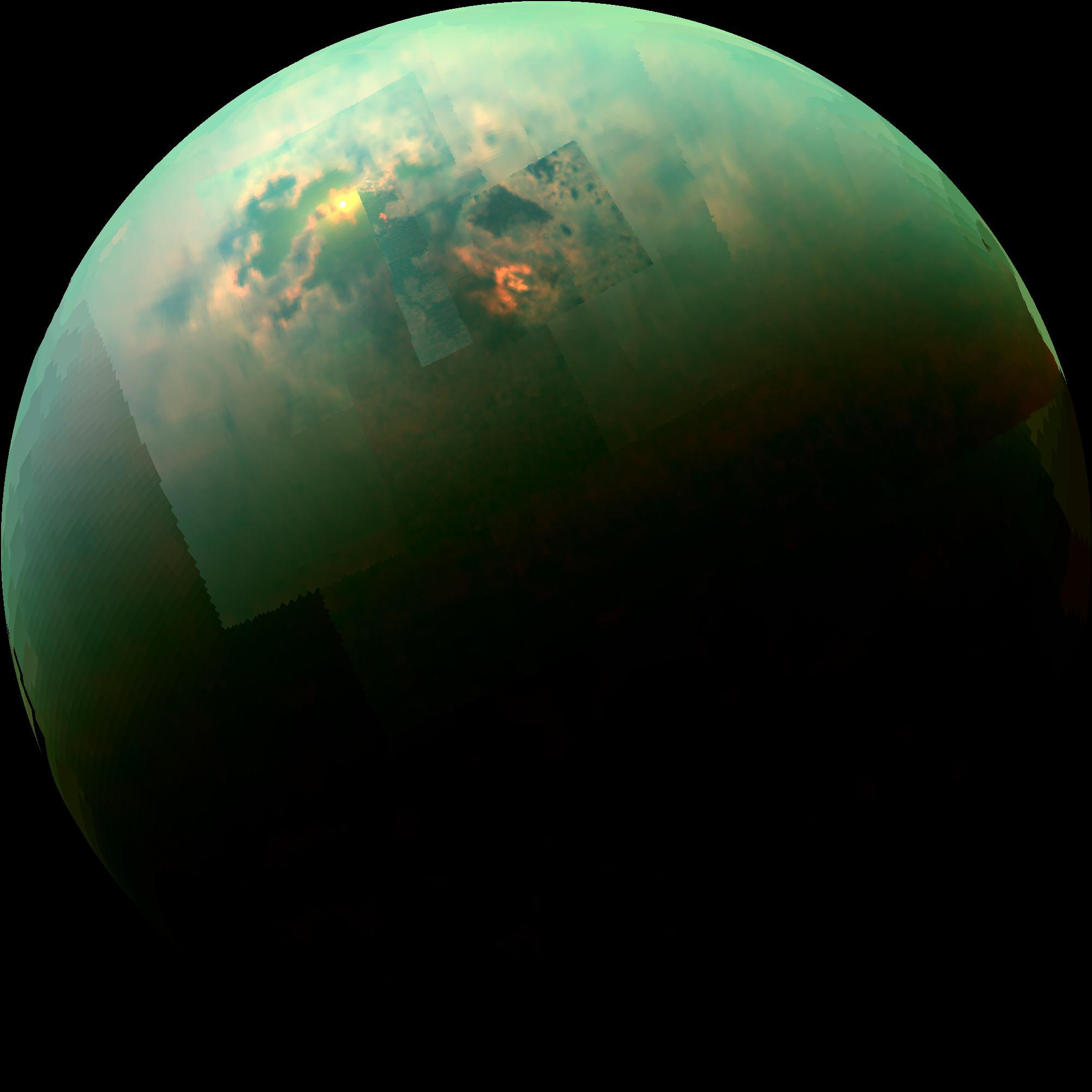
15 October: The discovery of cyclopropenylidene in the atmosphere of Saturn's moon Titan is announced.

- 15 October
  - A preliminary report by the WHO's Solidarity trial concludes that its four tested, repurposed, treatments "appeared to have little or no effect on hospitalized COVID-19, as indicated by overall mortality, initiation of ventilation and duration of hospital stay".
  - NASA scientists announce the discovery of small amounts of unprotonated cyclopropenylidene – a possible precursor to more complex astrobiological compounds – in the atmosphere of Saturn's moon Titan via ALMA.
  - Researchers report that two Homo species lost more than half of their climate niche space just before extinction and that climate change played a substantial role in extinctions of past Homo species.
- 16 October – The shortest timespan ever is measured via photoionization: ≈247 zeptoseconds, during which a particle interaction occurs – a photon traveling through a hydrogen molecule.
- 19 October
  - Scientists reconstruct the mechanisms, integrating them in a biogeochemical model, that led to the largest known extinction event, the Permian–Triassic extinction event 252 Mya, and report that it can be traced back to volcanic CO_{2} emissions.
  - Researchers report that polypropylene infant feeding bottles with contemporary preparation procedures were found to cause microplastics exposure to infants ranging from 14,600 to 4,550,000 particles per capita per day in 48 regions. Microplastics release is higher with warmer liquids and similar with other polypropylene products such as lunchboxes.

20 October: NASA's spacecraft OSIRIS-REx collects a sample from asteroid Bennu, becoming the world's third spacecraft to do so.

- 20 October – NASA's OSIRIS-REx spacecraft briefly touches down on Bennu, becoming the agency's first probe to retrieve samples from an asteroid, with its cargo due for return to Earth in 2023.
- 21 October – Scientists analyze the all-cause mortality effect of the first wave of the COVID-19 pandemic for 21 industrialized countries – including its timing, demographics and excess deaths per capita – and assess determinants for substantial death rate variations such as the countries' pandemic preparedness and management.
- 23 October – Scientists illustrate that and how quantum clocks could experience a possibly experimentally testable superposition of proper times via time dilation of Einstein's theory of relativity by which time passes slower for one object in relation to another object when the former moves at a higher velocity. In "quantum time dilation" one of the two clocks moves in a superposition of two localized momentum wave packets, resulting in a change to the classical time dilation.

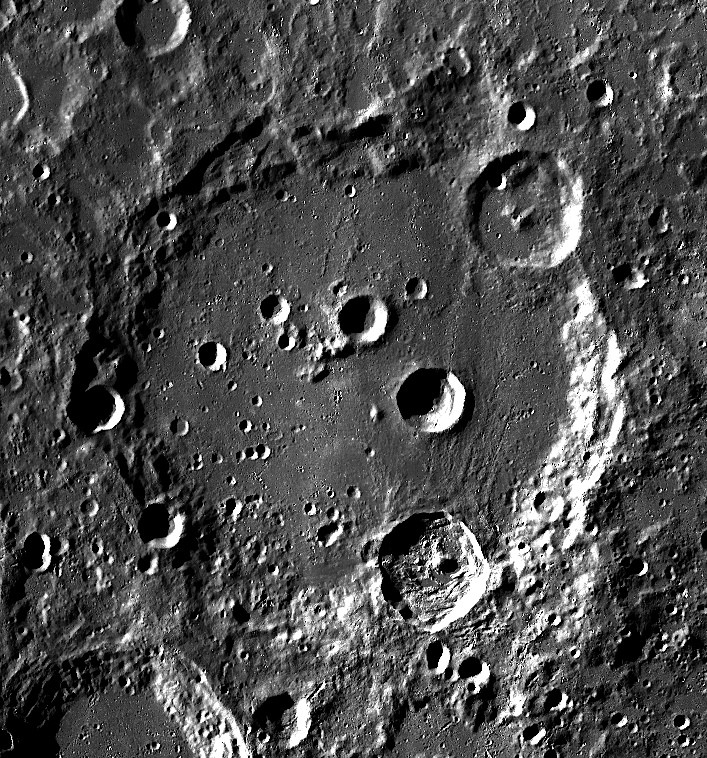
26 October: Astronomers report detecting molecular water on the sunlit surface of the Moon outside of the lunar south pole.

- 26 October
  - Astronomers report detecting molecular water on the sunlit surface of the Moon outside of the lunar south pole by data from three independent spacecraft and the SOFIA.
  - Astronomers confirm, based on new observations, Yarkovsky acceleration of asteroid Apophis, which is relevant to asteroid impact avoidance as the asteroid is currently thought to have a very small chance of Earth impact in 2068.
- 27 October – The largest clinical trial – aiming to recruit over 5,000 participants – to investigate effects of Vitamin D supplementation – including with a dosage regime near the RDI – on risk and/or severity of COVID-19 and other acute respiratory infections, CORONAVIT, is launched. Another such trial's proposal was published in a journal on 10 October and is reported aiming to recruit 2,700 people across the United States.

28 October: the study "Water, energy and land insecurity in global supply chains" explained by a video

- 28 October
  - Scientists report finding a coral reef measuring 500 m in height, located at the northern tip of Australia's Great Barrier Reef, the first discovery of its kind in 120 years.
  - Scientists publish estimates of the occurrence rates of rocky habitable zone planets around Sun-like stars with updated data and criteria for habitable zones – including ≈4 such exoplanets around G and K dwarf stars within 10 pc of the Sun and ≈300 million in the Milky Way.
  - Scientists report in a preprint that a variant of SARS-CoV-2, 20A.EU1, was first observed in Spain in early summer and has become the most frequent variant in multiple European countries. They also illustrate the emergence and spread of other frequent clusters of sequences using Nextstrain.
  - A systematic, and possibly first large-scale, cross-sectoral analysis of water, energy and land in security in 189 countries that links national and sector consumption to sources shows that countries and sectors are highly exposed to over-exploited, insecure, and degraded such resources with economic globalization having decreased security of global supply chains. The study finds that most countries exhibit greater exposure to resource risks via international trade – mainly from remote production sources – and that diversifying trading partners is unlikely to help countries and sectors to reduce these or to improve their resource self-sufficiency.

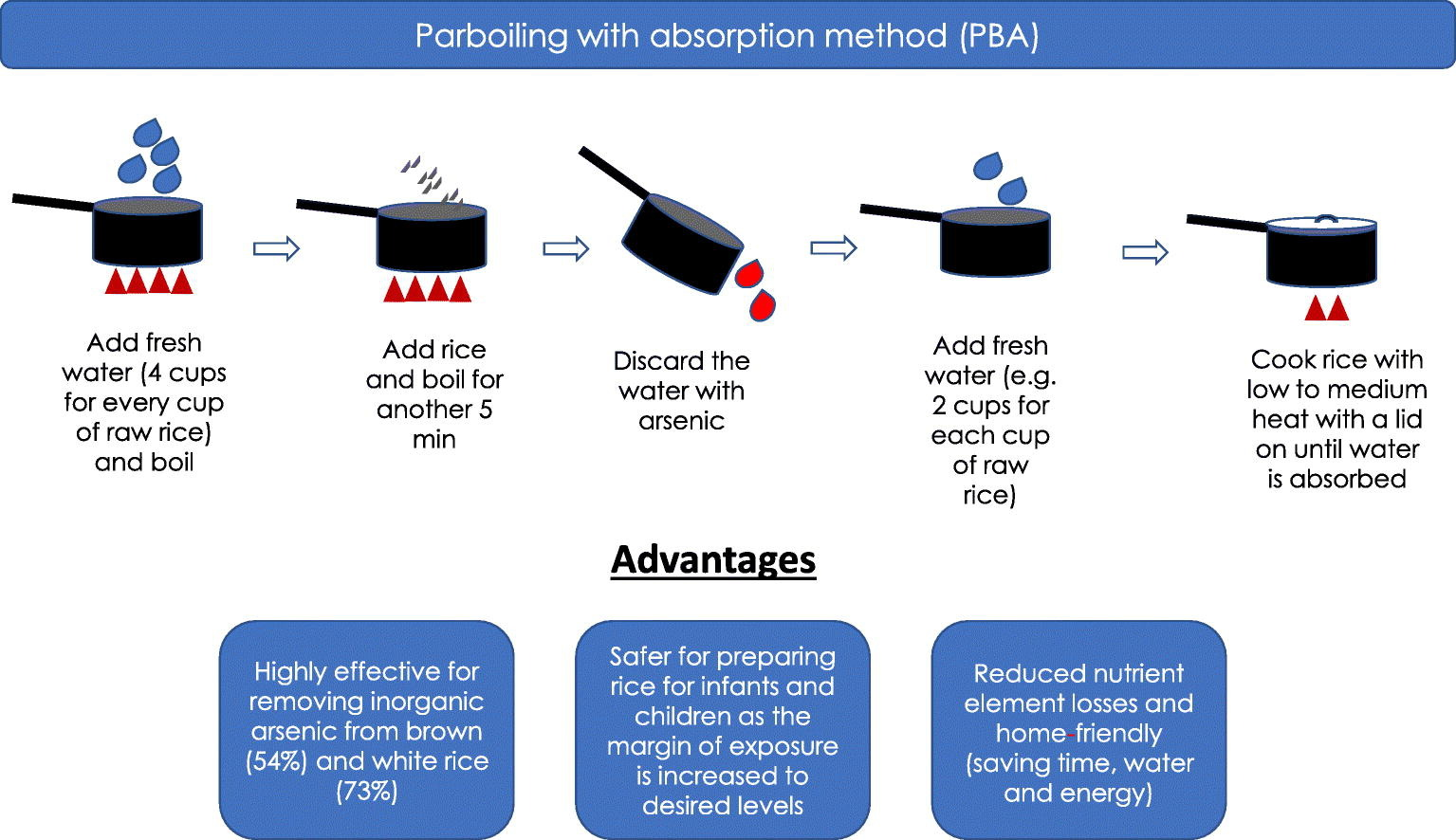
29 October: Scientists recommend a healthy preparation procedure of rice.

- 29 October – Scientists assess four preparation procedures of rice for their capacity to reduce arsenic content and preserve nutrients, recommending a procedure involving parboiling and water-absorption.
- 31 October – Slovakia starts implementation of a short-period mass-testing programme to test two-thirds of its citizens for COVID-19.

=== November ===
Science Summary for this section (November)

- 1 November – Scientists report that Sahelanthropus tchadensis, presumed to be an extinct hominin earlier, is not a hominin after all.
- 3 November – A Danish state-owned independent research institute reports the discovery of mutated variants of SARS-CoV-2 that humans can be infected by and could have dangerous effects, called "Cluster 5", in the mink population in the country's mink industry. A day afterwards officials of the nation announce that minks would be culled in order to prevent possible spread of this mutation and reduce the risk of new mutations happening. Lockdown and travel restrictions were implemented on 6 November. On 19 November SSI announced that cluster 5 in all probability had become extinct.

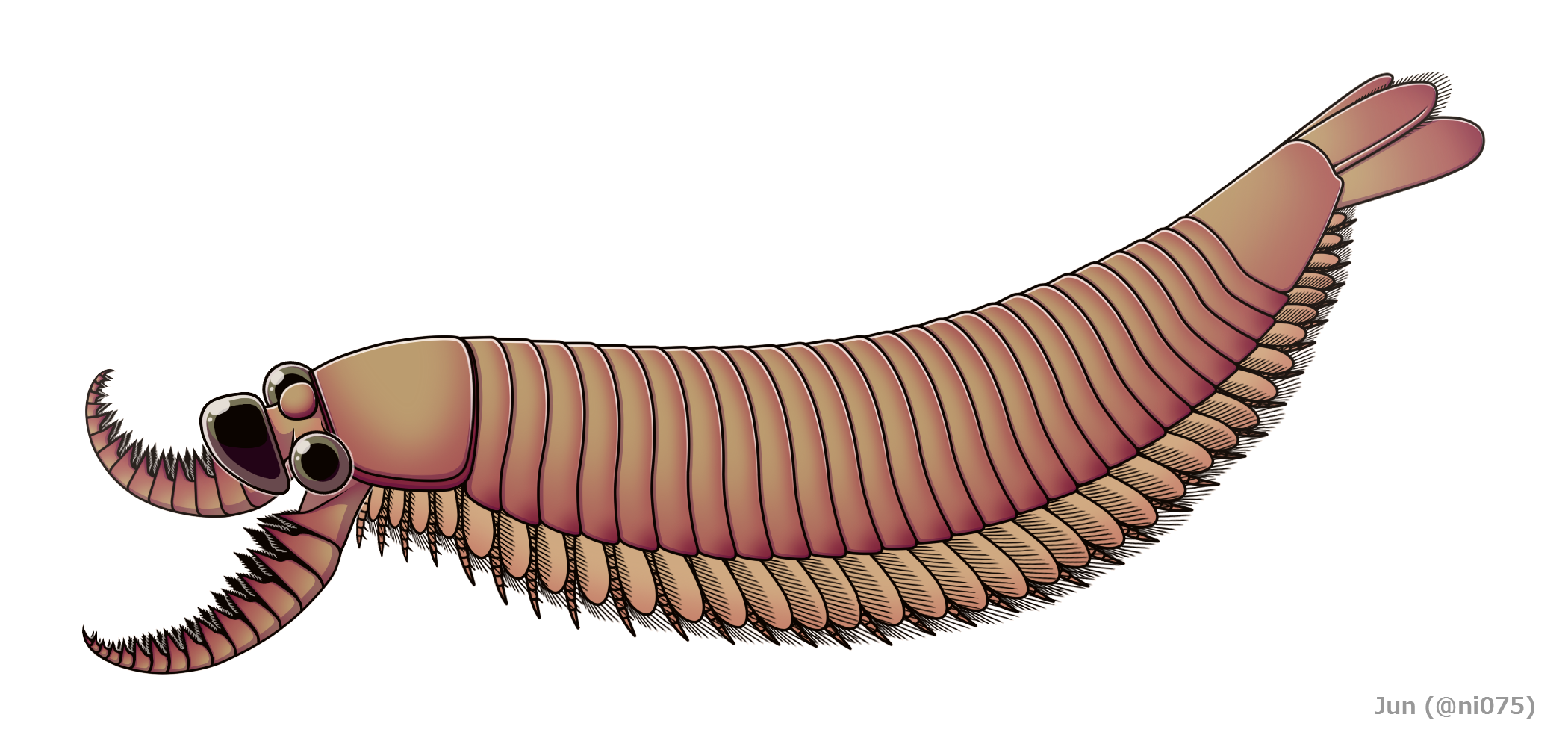
4 November: Scientists announce the discovery of Kylinxia which could be at the evolutionary root of arthropods.

- 4 November
  - Astronomers determine that magnetars are a prime source of fast radio bursts (FRBs).
  - Scientists announce the discovery of Kylinxia, a five-eyed ≈5 cm long shrimp-like animal living ~520 Mya that appears to be a key 'missing link' of the evolution from Anomalocaris to arthropods and could be at the evolutionary root of arthropods.
  - Further evidence – based on paired coronene-mercury spikes – for a volcanic combustion cause of the largest known mass extinction of life 252 Mya is published.
- 6 November
  - Astrophysicists report the first X-ray emissions measurement of baryonic matter of cosmic web filaments, strengthening empirical support for a recent solution to the missing baryon problem of missing detections of ≈40% of ordinary matter.
  - Researchers report the development of superconducting Bose-Einstein condensate.
  - Scientists report that reducing emissions from the global food system is critical to achieving the Paris Agreement's climate goals.
  - Scientists begin collecting living fragments, tissue and DNA samples of corals from the Great Barrier Reef for a biobank for potential future restoration and rehabilitation activities.
- 9 November – The first successful phase III trial of a possible COVID-19 vaccine, BNT162b2, is announced by drug companies Pfizer and BioNTech, Pfizer claims a reduction of infections by "over 90%", specified to be 95% later.
- 10 November
  - Scientists show why concentrations of radionuclides in rocky planet mantles may be critical for the habitability of Earth-like planets as such planets with higher abundances likely lack a persistent dynamo for a significant fraction of their lifetimes and those with lower abundances may often be geologically inert. Planetary dynamos create strong magnetic fields which may often be necessary for life to develop or persist and radionuclides are thought to be produced by rare stellar processes such as neutron star mergers.
  - Scientists show, with an experiment with different gravity environments on the ISS, that microorganisms could be employed to mine useful elements from basalt rocks via bioleaching in space.
  - A scientist releases visualizations that show why face masks meant to slow the spread of COVID-19 should not have valves under a free license.

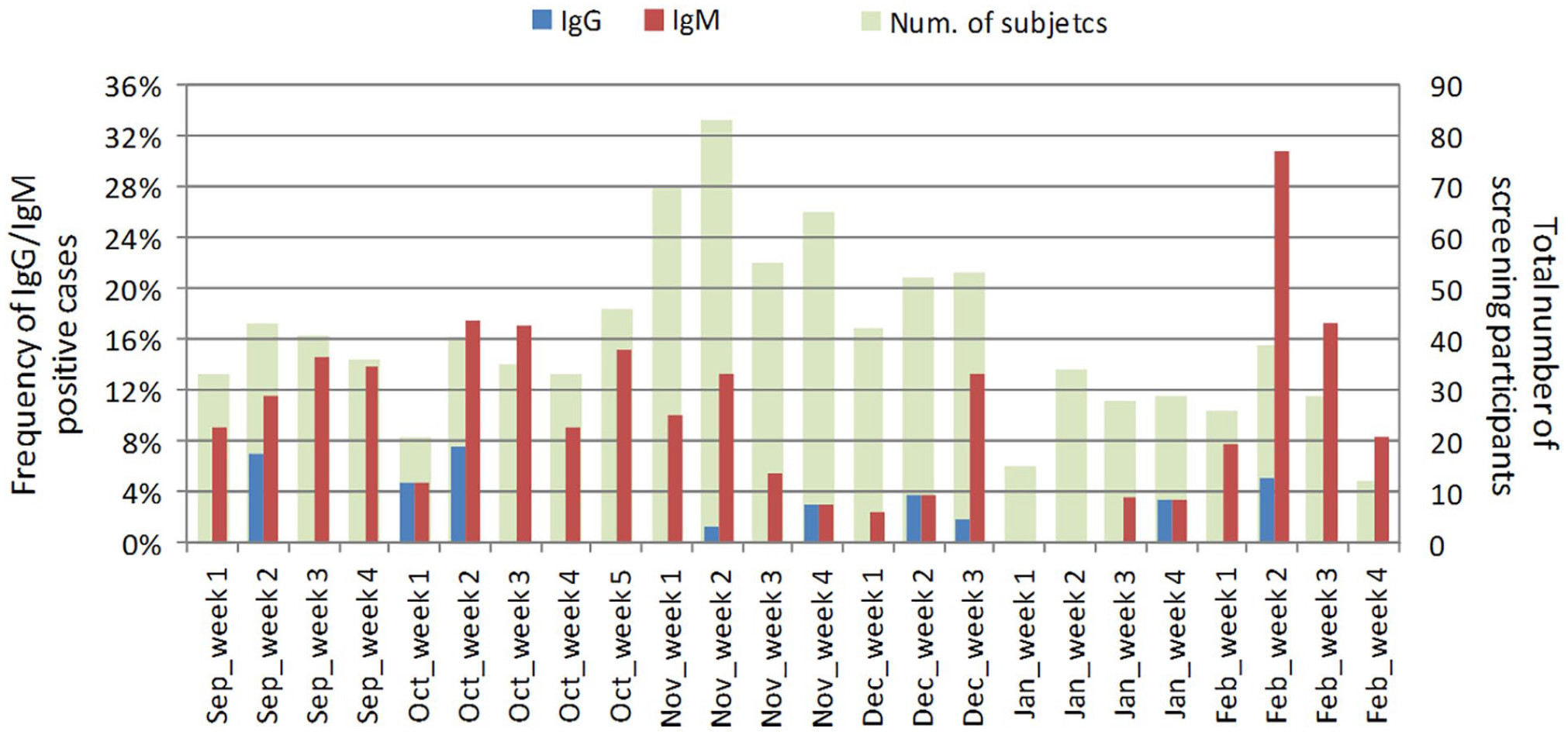
11 November: Scientists report the detection of SARS-CoV-2 RBD antibodies as early as 3 September 2019, which could establish a substantially earlier start time of the C19 pandemic.

- 11 November
  - Astronomers report newly found evidence for volcanic activity as recently as 53–210 kya on the planet Mars. Such activity could have provided the environment, in terms of energy and chemicals, needed to support life forms.
  - Scientists report the detection of SARS-CoV-2 receptor-binding domain antibodies in 111 (11.6%) of 959 asymptomatic individuals of a lung cancer screening trial in Italy, starting from 3 September 2019, apparently establishing a substantially earlier start time of the COVID-19 pandemic. However, the journal published an expression of concern in March 2021 due to possible issues with the peer review.
- 12 November – Scientists report the development of a microalgae-based fish-free aquaculture feed with substantial gains in sustainability, performance, economic viability, and human health.
- 13 November – Scientists report that Mars' current loss of atomic hydrogen from water is largely driven by seasonal processes and dust storms that transport water directly to the upper atmosphere and that this has influenced the planet's climate.
- 16 November
  - Results of phase III trials of Moderna's mRNA vaccine are announced, the company claims to 94.5% reduction of COVID-19 cases based on interim results, including severe illnesses. The vaccine is easier to distribute than BNT162b2 as no ultra-cold storage is required.
  - ALMA staff release a corrected version of the data used by other scientists in a study published on 14 September that claimed an apparent detection of phosphine in Venus' atmosphere. On the same day authors of this study publish a re-analysis as a preprint using the new data that concludes the planet-averaged PH_{3} abundance to be ≈7 times lower than what they detected with data of the previous ALMA processing, to vary by location and to be reconcilable with the JCMT detection of ≈20 times this abundance if substantially varying in time. They also respond to points raised in a preprint that challenged their conclusions in October and find that so far no other compound can explain the data. ALMA is reported to be expected to restart in early 2021 after a shutdown due to the COVID-19 crisis and may enable further observations that could provide insights for the ongoing investigation.
- 18 November – Researchers report that CRISPR/Cas9, using a lipid nanoparticle delivery system, has been used to treat cancer effectively in a living animal for the first time.
- 21 November – Sentinel-6 Michael Freilich is launched into orbit, to monitor sea levels in higher detail than ever before. The satellite's resolution will allow measuring of water depths closer to the shore, which has long been an area of uncertainty.
- 23 November
  - Medical researchers report that during human-to-human transmission, an average of about 1000 infectious SARS-CoV-2 virions is thought to initiate a new infection.
  - Preliminary test results for AstraZeneca's AZD1222 vaccine, developed in collaboration with Oxford University are released. The company claims 70% efficacy in the overall study, and 90% in a subsample where the first dose was reduced by accident.
  - A small randomized controlled trial suggests that an additional increase in plant-based, protein-rich foods alongside additional restriction of meat intake can amplify the known beneficial effects of the Mediterranean diet.

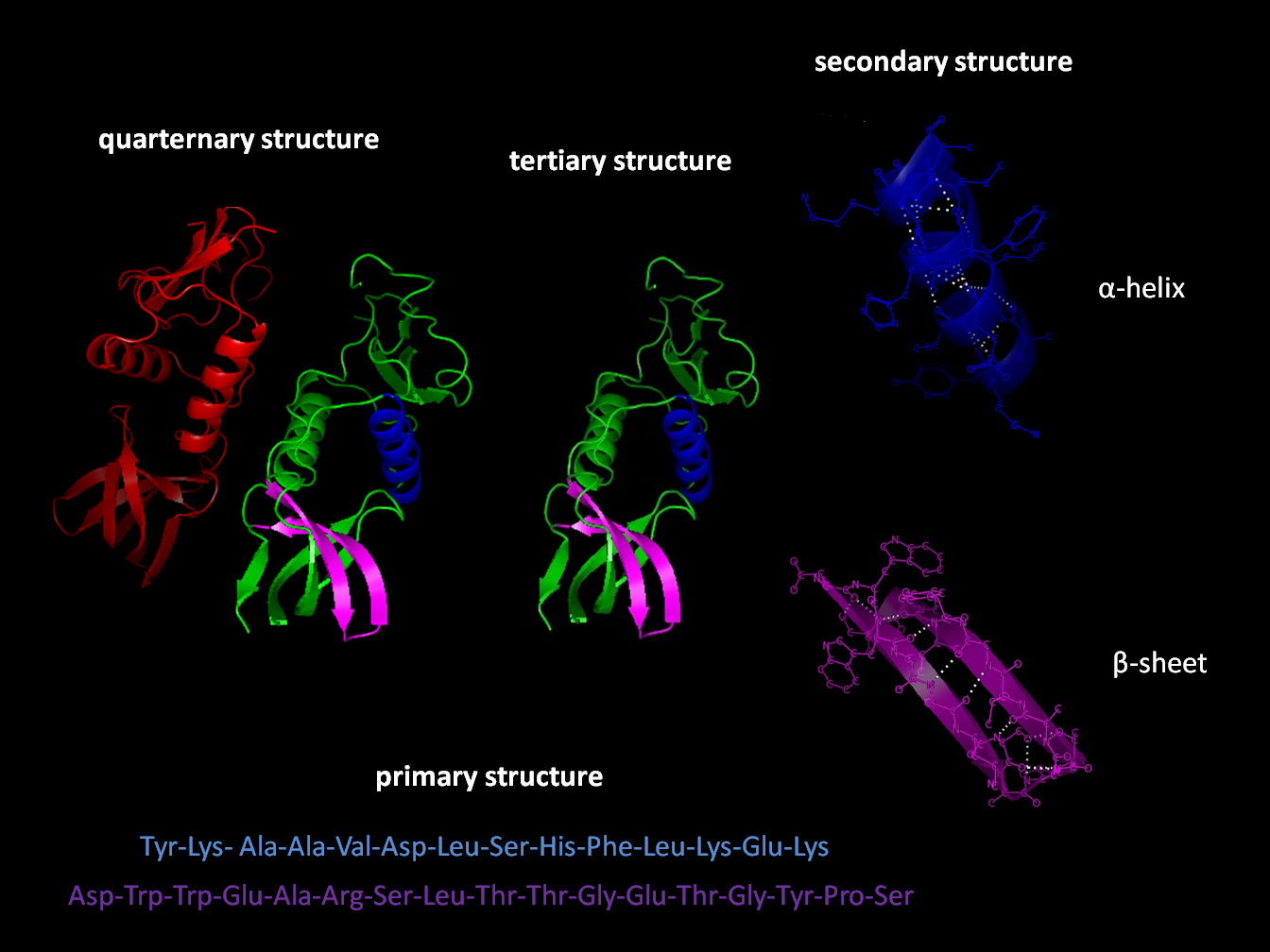
30 November: The 50-year problem of protein structure prediction is reported to be largely solved with an AI algorithm.

- 24 November
  - A study shows that bottlenose dolphins can learn – apparently via instrumental conditioning – to rapidly and selectively slow down their heart rate during diving for conserving oxygen depending on external signals. In humans regulating heart rate by methods such as listening to music, meditation or a vagal maneuver takes longer and only lowers the rate to a much smaller extent.
  - A scientific review summarizes current scientific knowledge about optimal design of face mask products with goals such as thermal comfort and suppression of COVID-19 spread as indicated by fluid flow dynamics, and about the efficacy of their use for the prevention of COVID-19 spread.
  - Neuroscientists report that a small randomized double-blind within-subject study of healthy young adults shows that dietary flavanols from cocoa powder can improve brain oxygenation at suboptimal baseline cerebrovascular reactivity to CO_{2} and – when cognitive demand is high – cognitive performance.
- 25 November
  - The Borexino collaboration reports the detection of Solar neutrinos produced by the carbon–nitrogen–oxygen cycle, confirming prior predictions about a mechanism – dominant in stars heavier than the Sun – that fuses hydrogen into helium.
  - Scientists report the development of micro-droplets for algal cells or synergistic algal-bacterial multicellular spheroid microbial reactors capable of producing oxygen as well as hydrogen via photosynthesis in daylight under air, which may be useful as a hydrogen economy biotechnology.
- 29 November – A team of international scientists create a study which suggests that the primeval atmosphere of the early Earth was much different than the conditions used in the Miller-Urey studies considering the origin of life on Earth and more similar to the current atmosphere of Venus.
- 30 November – DeepMind, an artificial intelligence company, demonstrates a new deep learning-based approach for protein folding, one of the biggest problems in biology, achieving a high protein structure prediction accuracy in tests of the biennial CASP assessment with AlphaFold 2.

=== December ===
Science Summary for this section (December)

1 December: the Arecibo Telescope collapses.

- 1 December
  - The Arecibo Telescope collapses after several hurricanes, storms, and earthquakes over the 2010s raised concerns over the stability of the Arecibo Observatory and two cable breaks in August and November led teams of engineers to assess a high risk of collapse. One of the three teams determined there to be no safe way to repair the damage due to which the NSF announced the decision for a controlled decommissioning of the telescope on 19 November, a few days before the collapse, which was challenged by scientists worldwide who, with a public petition subsequent to this announcement, asked for it to be repaired instead. The telescope built in 1963 was Earth's largest single-aperture telescope until 2016 and the source technology for many significant scientific discoveries, SETI as well as of the 1974 Arecibo message.
  - The Chinese experimental nuclear fusion reactor HL-2M is turned on for the first time, achieving its first plasma discharge.

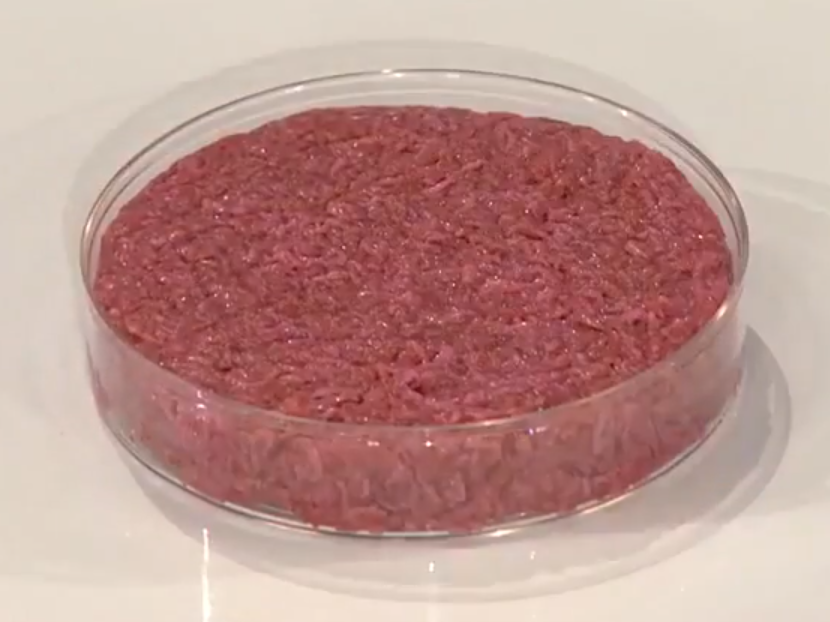
2 December: The world's first regulatory approval for a cultivated meat product is granted. (Image shows other cultured meat)

2 December: Scientists confirm 2020 SO to be rocket booster space junk.

- 2 December
  - The World Meteorological Organization reports that 2020 is likely among the three warmest years on record globally, at 1.2 °C above the pre-industrial level. The ten years from 2011 to 2020 are also reported to be the warmest decade on record.
  - Scientists report finding microplastics in the placentas of women with unborn babies for the first time. These may have negative effects on the fetal development.
  - The world's first regulatory approval for a cultivated meat product is awarded by the Government of Singapore. The chicken meat was grown in a bioreactor in a fluid of amino acids, sugar, and salt. The chicken nuggets food products are ≈70% lab-grown meat, while the remainder is made from mung bean proteins and other ingredients. The company pledged to strive for price parity with premium "restaurant" chicken servings.
  - Scientists confirm 2020 SO to be rocket booster space junk.
- 3 December
  - Chinese researchers claim to have achieved quantum supremacy, using a photonic up to 76-qubit system known as Jiuzhang, which performed calculations at 100 trillion times the speed of classical supercomputers.
  - Scientists report that repurposed Molnupiravir can completely suppress SARS-CoV-2 transmission within 24 hours in ferrets whose COVID-19 transmission they find to closely resemble SARS-CoV-2 spread in human young adult populations.

8 December: Second successful retrieval of pristine asteroid-samples via Hayabusa2.

- 8 December
  - Samples preserved for an estimated 4.6 bn years collected from asteroid 162173 Ryugu with the Japanese spacecraft Hayabusa2 are retrieved on Earth. The capsule containing the two samples becomes the second retrieved pristine asteroid sample a decade after Hayabusa collected the first and includes sub-surface dust. It was sent off from 220 million km away with the spacecraft proceeding on a 2026 and 2031 route to two asteroids.
- 9 December
  - The Washington Post reports a serious warning for people with a "significant" history of allergies and the possibility of "anaphylactoid reactions" regarding the Pfizer COVID-19 vaccine.
  - Scientists report the detection of large-scale X-ray bubbles in the Milky Way halo.
  - A study finds there to be no direct causal relationship between the proportionally most comparable mass radiations and extinctions, substantially challenging the hypothesis of such creative mass extinctions.
- 10 December
  - A proof of concept study – published as a preprint and sent to a journal in June – indicates that sniffer dogs are highly effective in detecting the presence of SARS-CoV-2 in samples of human sweat with two colon-cancer trained dogs achieving success rates of 100% in their 68 tests. Research projects on dogs in COVID-19 screening were reported as early as July and also indicated potential efficacy. At least one trial with publication of results scheduled for early 2021 is ongoing.
  - Scientists report that four months old ravens can have physical and social cognitive skills similar to that of adult great apes in tests.

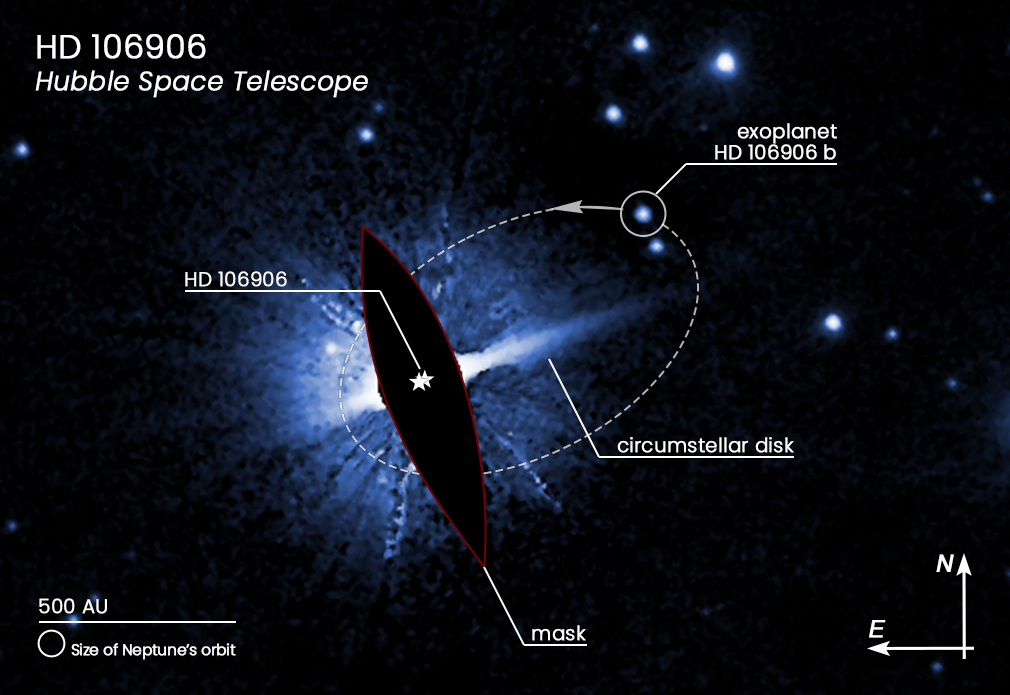
11 December: the orbital motion for HD 106906 b may be useful for attempts to predict the semi-major axis of the hypothetical Solar System object called Planet Nine.

- 11 December
  - Astronomers report that orbital motion for HD 106906 b was detected. This may be useful for attempts to predict the semi-major axis of the hypothetical Solar System object called Planet Nine.
  - A human thymus rebuilt using stem cells and a bioengineered scaffold is demonstrated.
  - A supercomputer simulation of planetary climate feedbacks vaguely suggests that chance – in terms of likeliness after known initial conditions – played a substantial role in Earth's thermal habitability lasting over 3 bn years.
  - The first whole-genome comparison between chimpanzees and bonobos is published and shows genomic aspects that may underlie or have resulted from their divergence and behavioral differences, including selection for genes related to diet and hormones.
- 14 December
    - Authorities of the United Kingdom report the detection and analysis of SARS-CoV-2 variant of Concern 202012/01 with an apparent increased transmissibility to the WHO.
    - On 18 December South African officials announce the detection of the 501.V2 variant with an apparent increased transmissibility.
    - These two variants of SARS-CoV-2 are reported to have spread worldwide as of 30 December.
    - On 23 December Malaysian officials announce the detection of similar variant 'A701B' (A701V).
    - On 24 December African Union officials announce the detection of non-similar variant B.1.1.207 in Nigeria without a confirmed association with increased transmission of the virus in the country at the time.
- 15 December – An analysis of external climate costs of foods indicates that external greenhouse gas costs are typically highest for animal-based products – conventional and organic to about the same extent within that ecosystem subdomain – followed by conventional dairy products and lowest for organic plant-based foods and concludes contemporary monetary evaluations to be "inadequate" and policy-making that lead to reductions of these costs to be possible, appropriate and urgent.

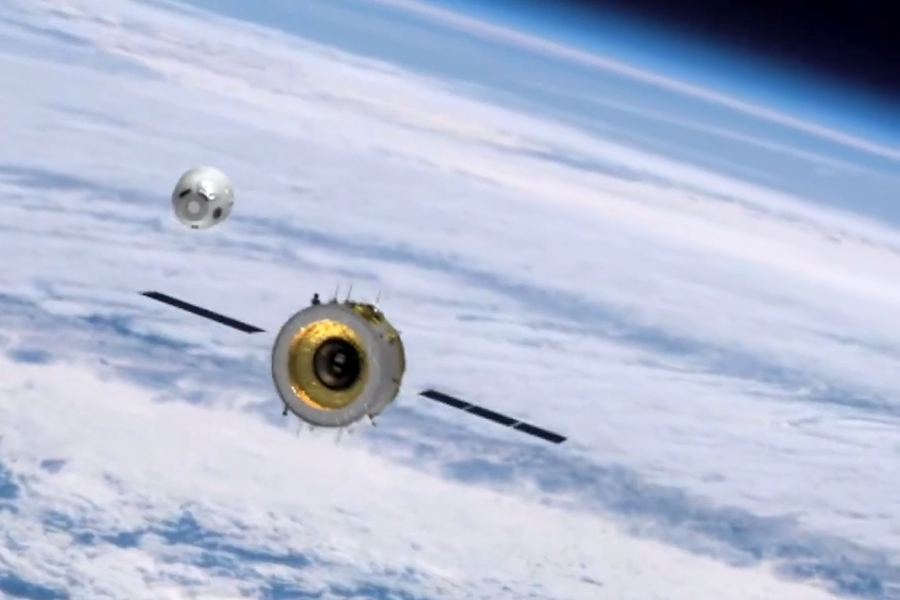
16 December: Chinese Chang'e 5 spacecraft return the first lunar sample since 1976.

- 16 December
  - For the first time, astronomers may have detected radio emissions from a planet beyond the Solar System. According to the researchers: "The signal is from the Tau Boötes system, which contains a binary star and an exoplanet. We make the case for an emission by the planet itself." Radio wave emissions may become a new way for examining exoplanets.
  - The Chinese Chang'e 5 spacecraft return a lunar sample, which marks the first lunar sample-return mission conducted since 1976. The Orbiter proceeded on a mission to carry out observations at Sun-Earth Lagrange point L1 after dropping the sample off to Earth.

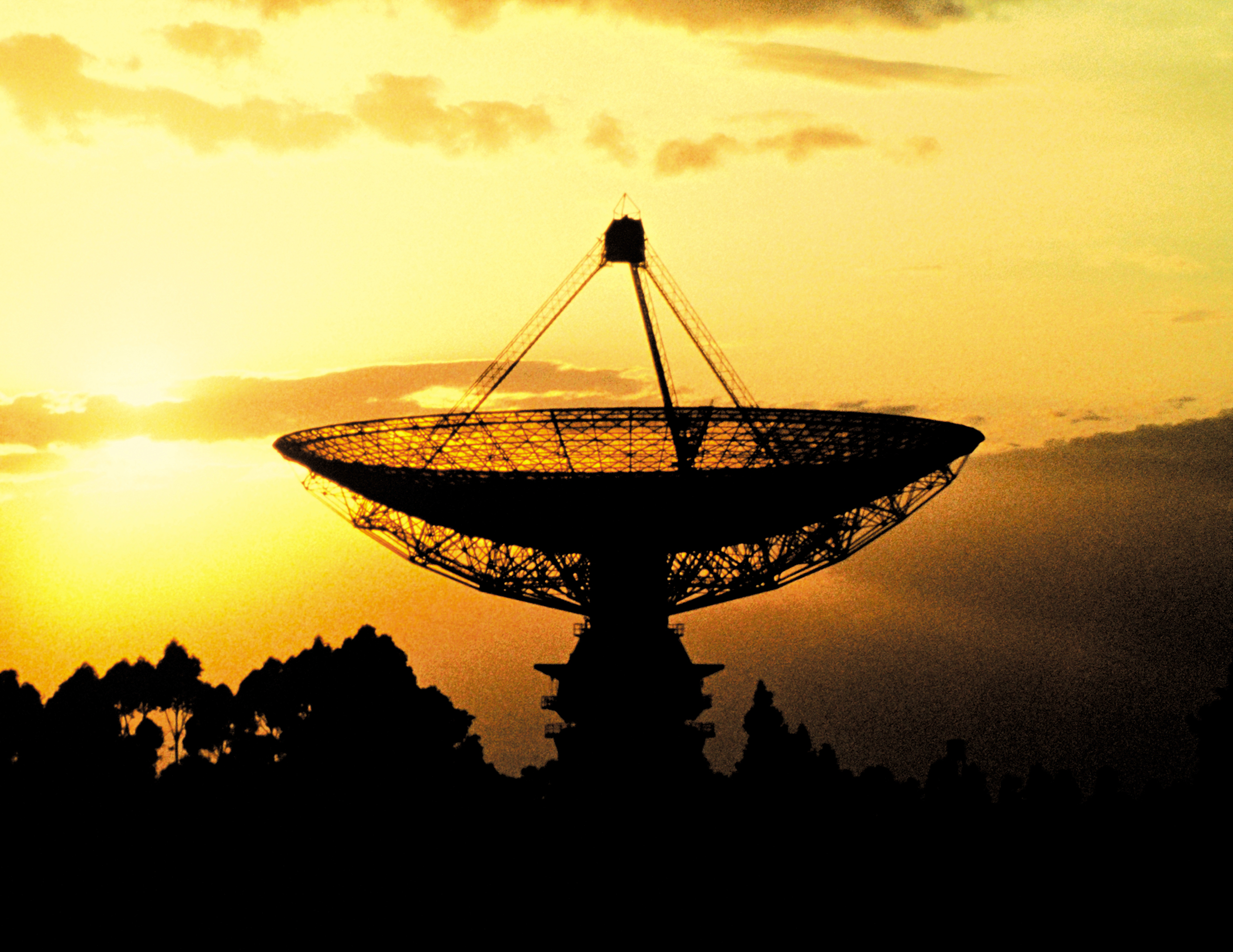
18 December: News reports about the detection of candidate ETI radio signal, BLC1, apparently from the direction of Proxima Centauri, the closest star to the Sun.

- 18 December
  - Media outlets report that astronomers detected a radio signal, BLC1 (Breakthrough Listen Candidate 1), apparently coming from the direction of Proxima Centauri, the closest star to the Sun. Astronomers have stated that this and other, yet unpublished, signals, "are likely interference that we cannot fully explain" and that it could be the strongest candidate for an extraterrestrial radio signal since the "Wow! signal" of 1977.
    - A paper by other astronomers released 10 days before the news report about BLC1 reports the detection of "a bright, long-duration optical flare, accompanied by a series of intense, coherent radio bursts" from Proxima Centauri also in April and May 2019. Their finding has not been put in direct relation to the BLC1 signal by scientists or media outlets so far but implies that planets around Proxima Centauri and other red dwarfs are likely to be rather uninhabitable for humans and other currently known organisms.
  - Ecologists report that the driest and warmest sites of 32 tracked Brazilian non-Amazon tropical forests have moved from carbon sinks to carbon sources overall c.2013.
  - Researchers report a deep learning approach to identify gene regulation at the single-cell level, which previously had been limited to tissue-level analysis.
- 21 December
  - Jupiter and Saturn come within a 6' arc (called a great conjunction), giving a rare telescopic view of the two so close together. As the two planets have an apparent size smaller than one arc minute, occultations are extremely rare: this is the closest approach since 1623 and the next occultation will happen in the year 7541.
  - Publication of research of "counterfactual quantum communication" – whose first achievement was reported in 2017 – by which information can be exchanged without any physical particle traveling between observers and without quantum teleportation. The research suggests that this is based on some form of relation between the properties of modular angular momentum.
  - Researchers publish projections and models of potential impacts of policy-dependent modulation of how, where, and what food is produced.
- 22 December
  - More than 109,000 new craters are identified in the low- and mid-latitude regions of the Moon using artificial intelligence.
  - A new mineral, dark green in colour and named kernowite, is discovered in Cornwall, South West England.
- 23 December – A study finds that face masks reduce the risk of spreading large COVID-19-linked droplets when speaking or coughing by up to 99.9 percent.
- 30 December – Scientists report finding microvascular blood vessel damage in tissue samples of brains without any detected SARS-CoV-2 as well as olfactory bulbs from patients who died from COVID-19.
- 31 December – Scientists determine that desalination membranes are inconsistent in density and mass distribution, and show a way to increase efficiency in the membranes by up to 40%.

== Awards ==
- Nobel Prize in Physiology or Medicine – Harvey J. Alter, Michael Houghton and Charles M. Rice for the discovery of the hepatitis C virus
- Nobel Prize in Physics – Roger Penrose (1/2) for the discovery that black hole formation is a robust prediction of the general theory of relativity
  Reinhard Genzel (1/4) and Andrea Ghez (1/4) for the discovery of a supermassive compact object at the centre of our galaxy
- Nobel Prize in Chemistry – Emmanuelle Charpentier and Jennifer A. Doudna for the development of a method for genome editing
- 20 December – VinGroup announced the launch of the global VinFuture Prize for authors of breakthrough research or technology inventions that have been shown to make people's lives better and improve a sustainable living environment.

== Deaths ==
- July 1 – Ray Matheny, American anthropologist (b. 1925)
- July 2
  - Ángela Jeria, Chilean archeologist (b. 1926)
  - Xu Qifeng, Chinese engineer (b. 1936)
  - Willem van Zwet, Dutch mathematician (b. 1934)
- July 3 – Erika Taube, German ethnologist (b. 1933)
- July 5 – Horace Barlow, British neuroscientist (b. 1921)
- July 6
  - Ronald Graham, American mathematician (b. 1935)
  - Deborah Zamble, Canadian chemist (b. 1971)
- July 7
  - Millicent S. Ficken, American ornithologist (b. 1933)
  - Juan Rosai, American pathologist (b. 1940)
  - Henk Tennekes, American toxicologist (b. 1950)
- July 8
  - Norman Allinger, American chemist (b. 1928)
  - Flossie Wong-Staal, Chinese and American virologist and molecular biologist (b. 1946)
- July 9 – Tong Binggang, Chinese physicist (b. 1927)
- July 10
  - Ananda Mohan Chakrabarty, Indian and American microbiologist (b. 1938)
  - Michael M. Richter, German mathematician and computer scientist (b. 1938)
- July 11 – Lim Boo Liat, Malaysian zoologist (b. 1926)
- July 14
  - Tim Clark, British physician (b. 1935)
  - Caesar Korolenko, Russian psychiatrist (b. 1933)
  - Alex McCool, American manager of the Space Shuttle Projects Office at NASA (b. 1923)
- July 13
  - Grant Imahara, American electrical engineer (b. 1970)
  - Zeng Yi, Chinese virologist (b. 1929)
- July 15 – George Simon, Guyanese archeologist (b. 1947)
- July 17
  - Angela von Nowakonski, Brazilian physician and medical researcher (b. 1953)
  - C. S. Seshadri, Indian mathematician (b. 1932)
  - Ron Tauranac, British and Australian engineer (b. 1925)
- July 21 – Li Jijun, Chinese geographer and geomorphologist (b. 1933)
- July 23
  - Masakazu Konishi, Japanese neurobiologist (b. 1933)
  - Jacqueline Noonan, American pediatric cardiologist (b. 1928)
  - Ward Plummer, American physicist (b. 1940)
  - Paolo Sassone-Corsi, Italian microbiologist (b. 1956)
- July 24 – Zheng Shouren, Chinese engineer (b. 1940)
- July 26
  - R. Stephen Berry, American physical chemist (b. 1931)
  - Roger Williams, British hepatologist (b. 1931)
  - Bill English, American computer engineer and co-developer of the computer mouse (b. 1929)
- August 1
  - Frank Barnaby, British nuclear physicist (b. 1927)
  - Rosemary Radley-Smith, British paediatric cardiologist (b. 1939)
- August 2 – Gregory Areshian, Armenian and American archeologist (b. 1949)
- August 4
  - Frances Allen, American computer scientist, first woman to win the Turing Award (b. 1932)
  - Irene D. Long, American physician (b. 1950)
  - Jan Strelau, Polish psychologist (b. 1931)
- August 6 – Louis Meznarie, French engineer (b. 1930)
- August 7
  - Lungile Pepeta, South African paediatric cardiologist (b. 1974)
  - Edward Bruner, American anthropologist (b. 1924)
- August 8
  - Dóra S. Bjarnason, Icelandic sociologist (b. 1947)
  - Bert Laeyendecker, Dutch sociologist (b. 1930)
  - Konrad Steffen, Swiss glaciologist (b. 1952)
- August 9 – Calaway H. Dodson, American botanist (b. 1928)
- August 11 – Russell Kirsch, American computer scientist and inventor of the first digital image scanner (b. 1929)
- August 12 – Robert Williams, American psychologist (b. 1930)
- August 13
  - Peter Stuart Excell, British engineer (b. 1948)
  - Bernd Fischer, German mathematician (b. 1936)
- August 14 – Kenneth Kunen, American mathematician (b. 1943)
- August 16
  - Nina McClelland, American chemist (b. 1929)
  - Jean-Michel Savéant, French chemist (b. 1933)
- August 17 – Richard M. White, American electrical engineer (b. 1930)
- August 18 – Han Woerdman, Dutch physicist (b. 1942)
- August 19 – Borys Paton, Ukrainian scientist (b. 1918)
- August 20 – Herbert Tabor, American biochemist (b. 1918)
- August 23 – Neil Douglas, British physician (b. 1949)
- August 25
  - Erik Allardt, Finnish sociologist (b. 1925)
  - Rebeca Guber, Argentine mathematician and computer scientist (b.1926)
  - Arnold Spielberg, American electrical engineer (b. 1917)
- August 26 – Gerald Carr, American astronaut and aeronautical engineer (b. 1932)
- August 28 – Seymour I. Schwartz, American surgeon (b. 1928)
- September 1 – James Jackson, American psychologist (b. 1944)
- September 2 – David Graeber, American anthropologist (b. 1961)
- September 6
  - George Carr Frison, American archeologist (b. 1924)
  - Vaughan Jones, New Zealand mathematician (b. 1952)
  - Takashi Sugimura, Japanese biochemist (b. 1926)
- September 7
  - Patricia Thiel, American chemist and materials scientist (b. 1953)
  - Chen Dingchang, Chinese aerospace engineer (b. 1937)
- September 8
  - Jean-Léon Beauvois, French psychologist (b. 1943)
  - James Greeno, American psychologist (b. 1935)
  - Sally Engle Merry, American anthropologist (b. 1944)
  - Jane Soons, New Zealand geomorphologist (b. 1931)
  - Yvette Taborin, French archeologist (b. 1929)
- September 11 – H. Jay Melosh, American geophysicist (b. 1947)
- September 13
  - Jean Garrabé, French psychiatrist (b. 1931)
  - Didier Lapeyronnie, French sociologist (b. 1956)
- September 14 – Robert Chabbal, French physician (b. 1927)
- September 15 – Mario Torelli, Italian archeologist (b. 1937)
- September 16 – William Henry Danforth, American physician (b. 1926)
- September 17 – Robert W. Gore, American engineer and inventor of waterproof fabrics (b. 1937)
- September 19 – Georgina Mace, British ecologist (b. 1953)
- September 20
  - Dan Olweus, Swedish and Norwegen psychologist (b. 1931)
  - Marian Packham, Canadian biochemist (b. 1927)
  - Richard Turner-Warwick, British urologist (b. 1925)
- September 21 – Arthur Ashkin, American physicist (b. 1922)
- September 22
  - Mary Gergen, American psychologist (b. 1938)
  - Sergey Khoruzhiy, Russian physicist (b. 1941)
  - Li Dongying, Chinese metallurgist (b. 1920)
- September 23
  - Charles Stuart Bowyer, American astronomer (b. 1934)
  - François Diederich, Luxembourgish chemist (b. 1952)
  - Renée Fox, American sociologist (b. 1928)
  - Toomas Frey, Estonian ecologist (b. 1937)
- September 24
  - Sekhar Basu, Indian nuclear scientist (b. 1952)
  - Zhang Xinshi, Chinese ecologist (b. 1934)
- September 26 – Dai Yuanben, Chinese physicist (b. 1928)
- September 27
  - John D. Barrow, British cosmologist, theoretical physicist, and mathematician (b. 1952)
  - Tjalling Waterbolk, Dutch archeologist (b. 1924)
- September 28 – Robert Adair, American physicist (b. 1924)
- September 30 – Scott Lilienfeld, American psychologist (b. 1960)
- 2 October – Victor Zalgaller, Russian and Israeli mathematician (b. 1920)
- 4 October – Louis Fortier, Canadian biologist and oceanographer (b. 1953)
- 5 October
  - Dirk Bootsma, Dutch geneticist (b. 1936)
  - Joshua N. Goldberg, American physicist (b. 1925)
- 6 October – Arthur P. Shimamura, American psychologist (b. 1954)
- 7 October
  - Mario Molina, Mexican chemist (b. 1943)
  - Peter Sleight, British cardiologist (b. 1929)
- 10 October
  - Amnon Freidberg, Israeli entomologist (b. 1945)
  - Dolores Cooper Shockley, American pharmacologist (b. 1930)
- 11 October
  - Ilya Moiseev, Russian chemist (b. 1929)
  - Michael D. Morley, American mathematician (b. 1930)
- 12 October – Sadegh Malek Shahmirzadi, Iranian archeologist and anthropologist (b. 1940)
- 14 October
  - Audrey Smedley, American anthropologist (b. 1930)
  - Joyce Wallace, American physician and AIDS researcher (b. 1940)
- 17 October – Zhang Lina, Chinese physical chemist (b. 1940)
- 18 October – Robert Coleman, American geologist (b. 1923)
- 19 October – Val Curtis, British scientist (b. 1958)
- 20 October
  - Yuri Mochanov, Russian archeologist (b. 1934)
  - Carl E. Thoresen, American psychologist (b. 1933)
- 21 October – J. Michael Lane, American epidemiologist (b. 1936)
- 24 October – Betty Ida Roots, British and Canadian zoologist (b. 1927)
- 26 October
  - Chris Abell, British biological chemist (b. 1957)
  - Albert Medwin, American electrical engineer (b. 1925)
- 28 October
  - Anthony van den Pol, American neurosurgeon (b. 1949)
  - Wen Fubo, Chinese engineer (b. 1925)
- 29 October
  - Valentin Pokrovsky, Russian epidemiologist (b. 1929)
  - Watt W. Webb, American biophysicist (b. 1927)
- 30 October – Chen Haozhu, Chinese cardiologist (b. 1924)
- 31 October – Rudolf Zahradník, Czech chemist (b. 1928)
- 4 November – Moncef Ouannes, Tunisian sociologist (b. 1956)
- 5 November
  - Jacques Glowinski, French biologist (b. 1936)
  - Janine Puget, Argentine psychiatrist (b. 1926)
  - Gordon Van Wylen, American physicist (b. 1920)
- 7 November
  - Hou Feng, Chinese engineer
  - Anatoly Mikhailovich Stepin, Russian mathematician
- 11 November – Robert Lue, American biologist (b. 1964)
- 12 November – Masatoshi Koshiba, Japanese physicist and Nobel laureate (b. 1926)
- 13 November
  - Robert Byron Bird, American chemical engineer (b. 1924)
  - Noah Hershkowitz, American physicist (b. 1941)
- 14 November – Peter Pagé, German computer scientist (b. 1939)
- 15 November
  - Rudolf Kippenhahn, German astrophysicist (b. 1926)
  - Anne Rasa, British ethologist (b. 1940)
- 17 November – William A. Clemens Jr., American paleontologist (b. 1932)
- 19 November
  - Roger J. Phillips, American geophysicist (b. 1940)
  - Gennady Zdanovich, Russian archeologist (b. 1938)
- 20 November – Antonio Ambrosetti, Italian mathematician (b. 1944)
- 22 November – Otto Hutter, British physiologist (b. 1924)
- 23 November – Konrad Fiałkowski, Polish engineer (b. 1939)
- 24 November – Erik Galimov, Russian geochemist (b. 1936)
- 27 November – Jin Zhanpeng, Chinese chemist (b. 1938)
- 29 November – Vladimir Fortov, Russian physicist (b. 1946)
- 30 November – Herman van Bekkum, Dutch organic chemist (b. 1932)
- 1 December
  - Norman Abramson, American engineer and computer scientist (b. 1932)
  - Li Guanxing, Chinese nuclear materials engineer (b. 1940)
- 4 December
  - Narinder Singh Kapany, Indian and American physicist (b. 1926)
  - Anatoly Samoilenko, Ukrainian mathematician (b. 1938)
- 7 December – Akito Arima, Japanese nuclear physicist (b. 1930)
- 9 December – Brian H. Murdoch, Irish mathematician (b. 1930)
- 10 December – Bryan Sykes, British geneticist (b. 1947)
- 11 December – Lev Shcheglov, Russian sexologist (b. 1946)
- 13 December – Leith Mullings, American anthropologist (b. 1945)
- 14 December
  - Claudio Baiocchi, Italian mathematician (b. 1940)
  - Benjamin Abeles, Austrian and Czech physicist (b. 1925)
  - Michael F. Land, British neurobiologist (b. 1942)
- 15 December – Feng Duan, Chinese physicist (b. 1923)
- 16 December – Wacław Szybalski, Polish and American oncologist (b. 1921)
- 21 December – Arnold Wolfendale, British astronomer (b. 1927)
- 22 December – Edmund M. Clarke, American computer scientist (b. 1945)
- 24 December – Tho. Paramasivan, Indian anthropologist (b. 1950)
- 26 December – Cirilo Nelson, Honduran botanist (b. 1938)
- 28 December – Zou Deci, Chinese engineer (b. 1934)
- 30 December – Alexander Spirin, Russian biochemist (b. 1931)

== See also ==
- Category:Science events
- Category:Science timelines
- Impact of the COVID-19 pandemic on science and technology
  - COVID-19 apps
  - COVID-19 vaccine
  - Face masks during the COVID-19 pandemic
  - Open-source ventilator#COVID-19 pandemic
- List of technologies
- List of emerging technologies
- List of years in science
