= Zhang Zongye =

Chinese nuclear theoretical physicist

- 张宗烨
- Born: January 29, 1935 (age 91); Yenching University, Beijing, China
- Education: Peking University
- Scientific career
- Fields: Nuclear physics
- Workplaces: Chinese Academy of Sciences (CAS)

Chinese name
- Traditional Chinese: 張宗燁
- Simplified Chinese: 张宗烨
Transcriptions
Standard Mandarin
- Hanyu Pinyin: Zhāng Zōngyè
- Wade–Giles: Chang Tsung-yeh

Zhang Zongye (Chinese: 张宗烨; born 29 January 1935) is a Chinese nuclear physicist. She is a research professor at the Institute of High Energy Physics and an academician of the Chinese Academy of Sciences (CAS).

== Biography ==
Zhang was born in Yenching University, Beijing, on January 29, 1935, to Zhang Dongsun, a philosopher and social activist, and Wu Shaohong (Chinese: 吴绍鸿). Her eldest brother Zhang Zongbing (Chinese: 张宗炳) was an entomologist. Her second eldest brother Zhang Zongsui was a physicist. Her third elder brother Zhang Zongying (Chinese: 张宗颖) is also a physicist. Her ancestral home is in Hangzhou, Zhejiang.

In September 1949 she attended the Beiman Girls' School (now Beijing No. 166 High School). In September 1952 she was accepted to Peking University, where she majored in physics.

After university, she was assigned to the Institute of High Energy Physics, Chinese Academy of Sciences as an assistant research fellow. In 1984 she conducted research at the University of Tübingen in West Germany. She was elected an academician of the Chinese Academy of Sciences (CAS) in 1999.
