= SN 2020fqv =

2020 supernova event in the NGC 4568 spiral galaxy collision

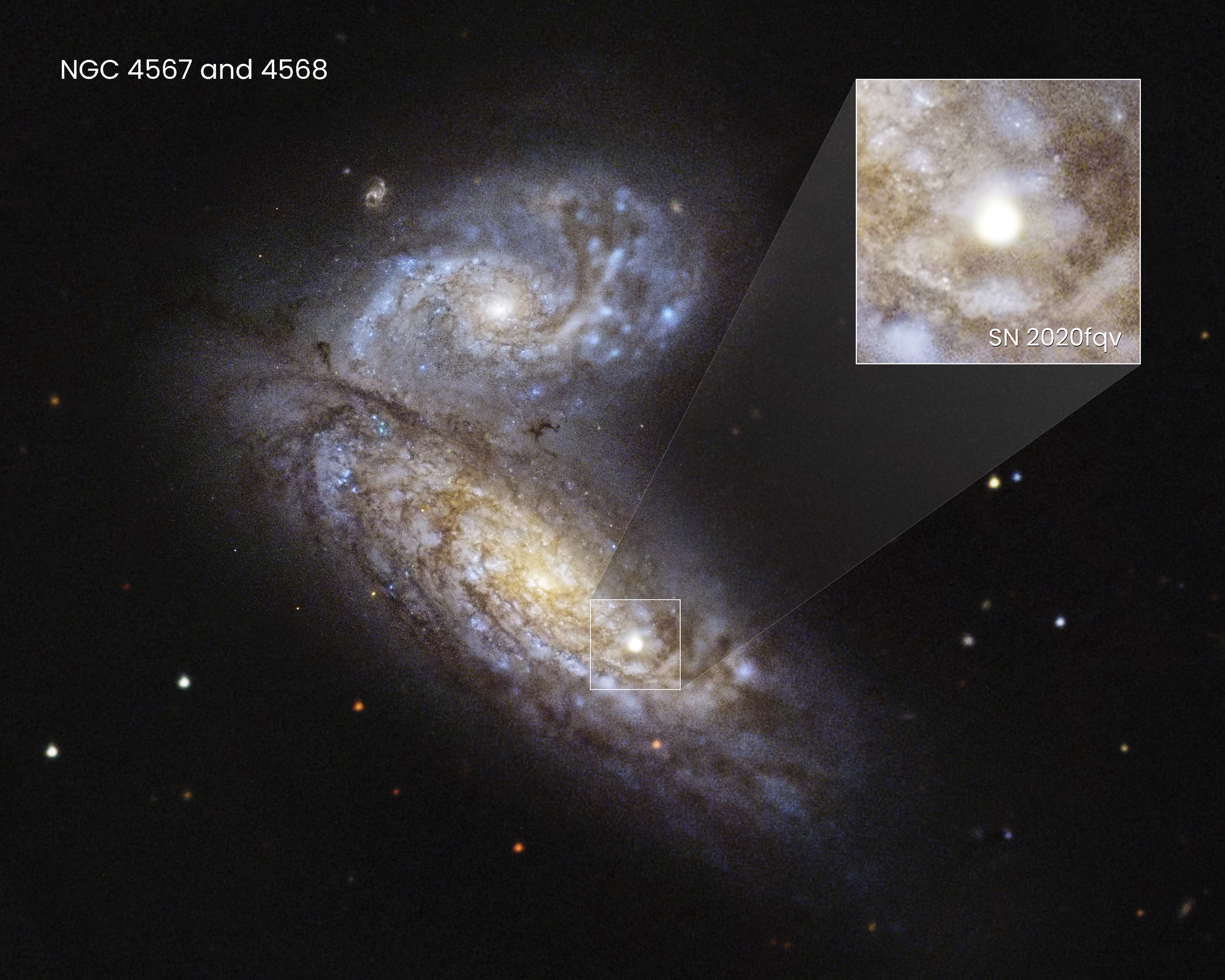
- Supernova SN 2020fqv in the Butterfly Galaxy NGC 4568
- Event type: SN IIb
- Date: March 31, 2020
- Right ascension: 12^{h} 36^{m} 33.260^{s}
- Declination: +11° 13′ 53.87″
- Epoch: J2000
- Galactic coordinates: NGC 4568
- Redshift: 0.007522
- Related media on Commons

SN 2020fqv was a Type II supernova which occurred in March 2020 in the spiral galaxy NGC 4568, approximately 60 million light years from Earth. The explosion was detected by both the Zwicky Transient Facility and the Transiting Exoplanet Survey Satellite. Observations were obtained by the Hubble Space Telescope both years before and just 26 hours after it exploded, as well as many other instruments, providing the first holistic view of such an event.

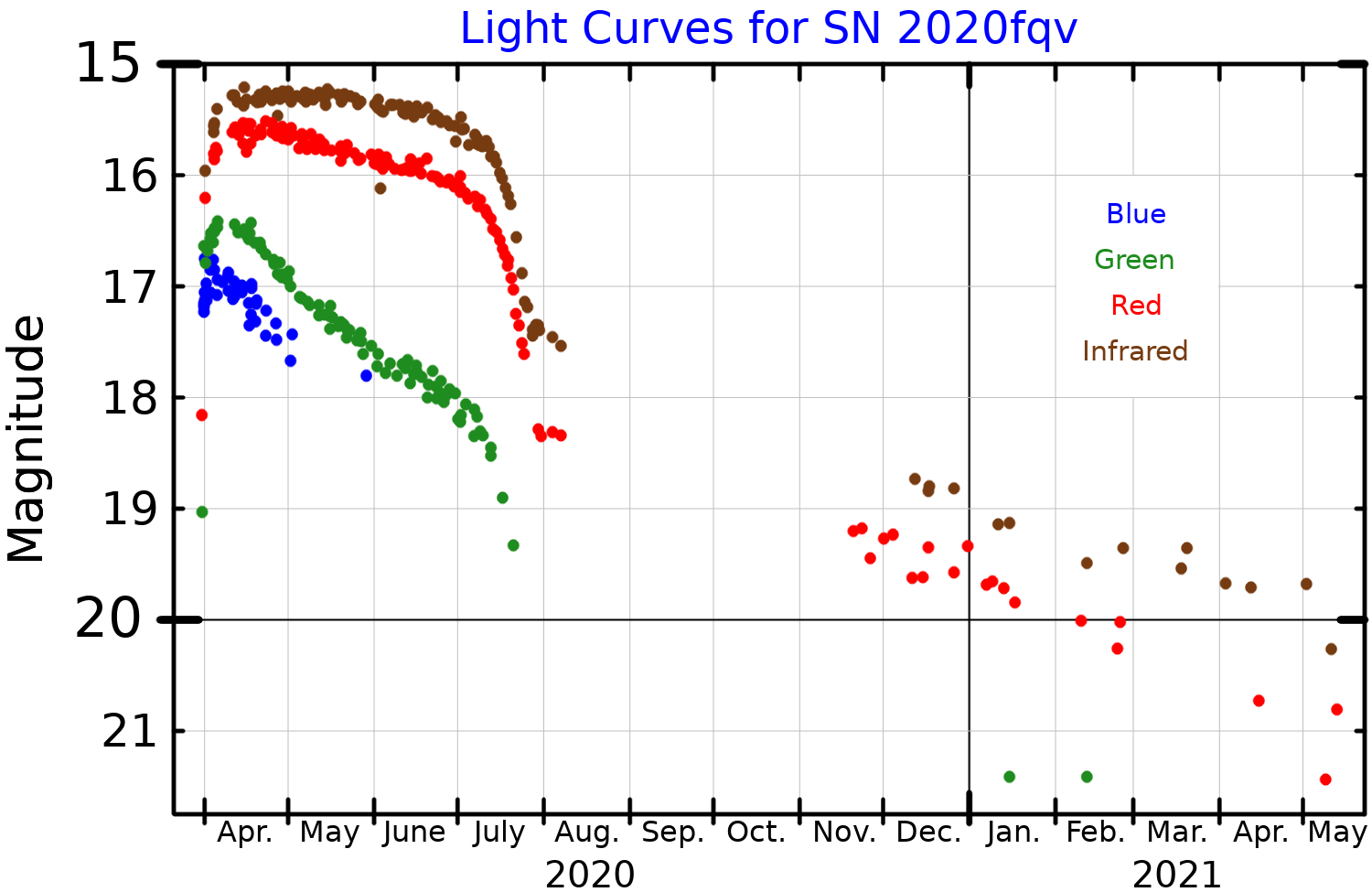
Light curves for SN 2020fqv in four photometric bands, adapted from Tinyanont et al. (2021)

The progenitor star is modelled to be a red supergiant with a radius of 800±100 R_{☉} and a mass of 15±3 M_{☉}, fairly typical of Type II supernova progenitors.
