= Dai Yuanben =

Chinese physicist (1928–2020)

- 戴元本
- Born: July 31, 1928; Nanjing, Jiangsu, China
- Died: September 26, 2020 (aged 92); Beijing, China
- Education: Nanjing University
- Scientific career
- Fields: Theoretical physics Particle physics
- Workplaces: Chinese Academy of Sciences (CAS)
- Academic advisors: Zhang Zongsui

Dai Yuanben (Chinese: 戴元本; pinyin: Dài Yuánběn; July 31, 1928 – September 26, 2020) was a Chinese physicist. He was a member of the 7th, 8th and 9th National Committee of the Chinese People's Political Consultative Conference.

== Biography ==
Dai was born in Nanjing, Jiangsu, on July 31, 1928, while his ancestral home was in Changde, Hunan. His grandfather Dai Decheng (戴德诚) was a reformist in the late Qing dynasty. His great-uncle Dai Zhancheng (戴展诚) was an administrator of Hunan First Normal University. His father Dai Xiujun (戴修骏) was a politician and university administrator who graduated from the University of Paris. He was the second of five brothers.

After the outbreak of the Second Sino-Japanese War in 1937, he moved with his family successively to Changsha, Guiyang, Kunming and Lunan County until the war ended in 1945. His studies were interrupted by the war. In 1946, his family resided in Nanjing, where he secondary studied at Nanjing No. 2 High and then the Secondary High School affiliated to National Central University. In July 1947, he was recommended for admission to National Central University. Soon, after a few months, his family moved to Shanghai due to the Chinese Civil War. When he returned to the campus in 1949, the university had been renamed "Nanjing University". After graduating in August 1952, he was dispatched to Nanjing Institute of Technology, where he was associate in 1952 and instructor in 1958. In 1958, he was admitted by the Graduate School of the Chinese Academy of Sciences, doing his postgraduate work at the Institute of Mathematics under Zhang Zongsui, and taught there when graduated. He was promoted to associate research fellow in 1963 and to research fellow in 1978. In 1978, he was transferred to the Institute of Theoretical Physics, Chinese Academy of Sciences. He died of illness in Beijing, on September 26, 2020, aged 92.

== Honours and awards ==
- November 1980 Member of the Chinese Academy of Sciences (CAS)
- 1982 State Natural Science Award (Second Class) for straton model
