= Kirsch operator =

Edge detector

The Kirsch operator or Kirsch compass kernel is a non-linear edge detector that finds the maximum edge strength in a few predetermined directions. It is named after the computer scientist Russell Kirsch.

== Mathematical description ==
The operator takes a single kernel mask and rotates it in 45 degree increments through all 8 compass directions: N, NW, W, SW, S, SE, E, and NE. The edge magnitude of the Kirsch operator is calculated as the maximum magnitude across all directions:

$$h_{n,m}=\max_{z=1,\dots,8}\sum_{i=-1}^1\sum_{j=-1}^1g_{ij}^{(z)}\cdot f_{n+i,m+j}$$

where z enumerates the compass direction kernels g:

$$\mathbf{g^{(1)}} = \begin{bmatrix}
+5 & +5 & +5 \\
-3 &  0 & -3 \\
-3 & -3 & -3
\end{bmatrix},\$$
$$\mathbf{g^{(2)}} = \begin{bmatrix}
+5 & +5 & -3 \\
+5 &  0 & -3 \\
-3 & -3 & -3
\end{bmatrix},\$$
$$\mathbf{g^{(3)}} = \begin{bmatrix}
+5 & -3 & -3 \\
+5 &  0 & -3 \\
+5 & -3 & -3
\end{bmatrix},\$$
$$\mathbf{g^{(4)}} = \begin{bmatrix}
-3 & -3 & -3 \\
+5 &  0 & -3 \\
+5 & +5 & -3
\end{bmatrix}$$
and so on.

The edge direction is defined by the mask that produces the maximum edge magnitude.

== Example images ==
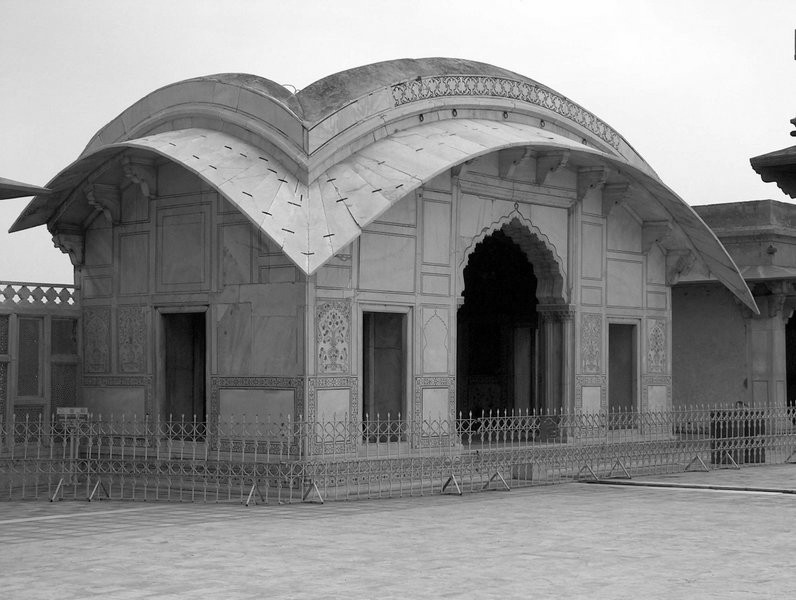
Original

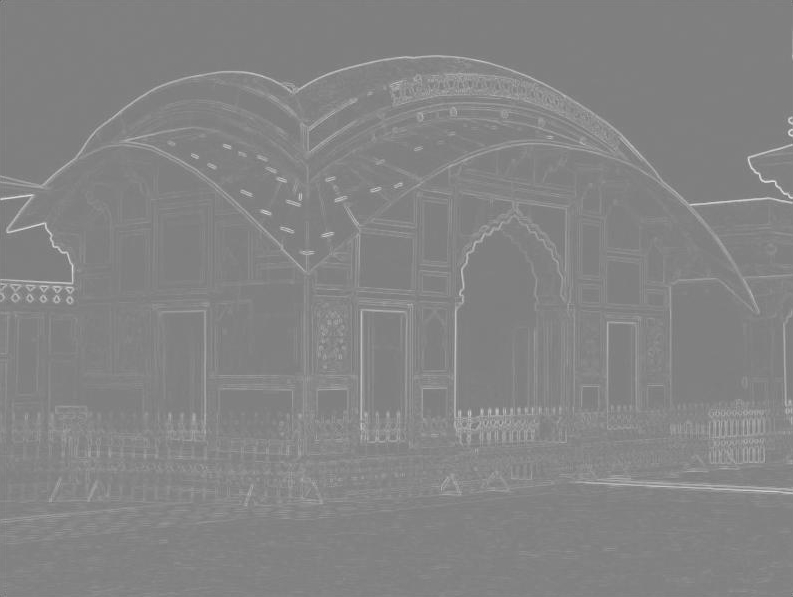
Maximum gradient in the 8 directions
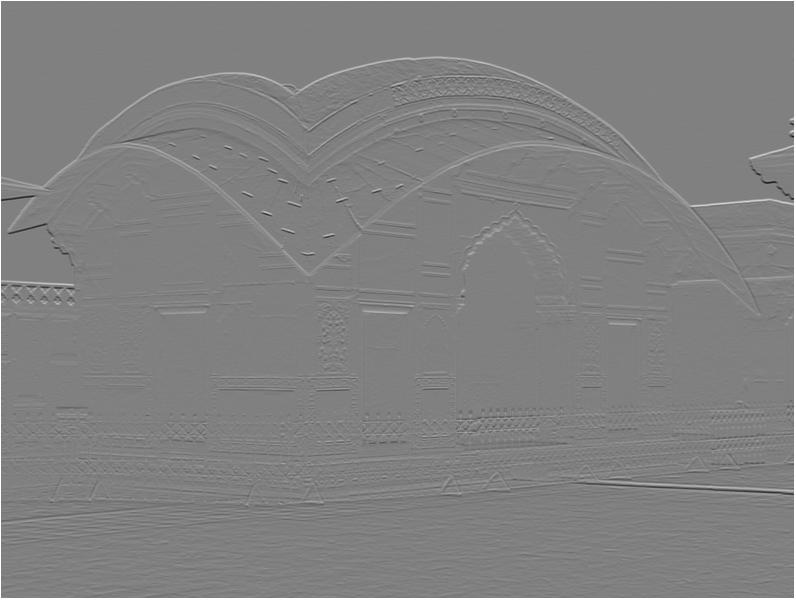
Image filtered with g^{(1)}

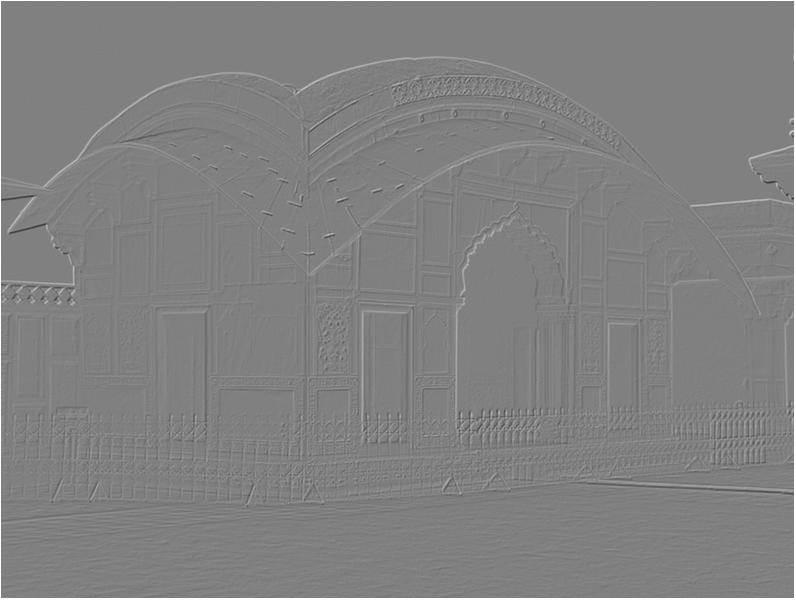
Image filtered with g^{(2)}

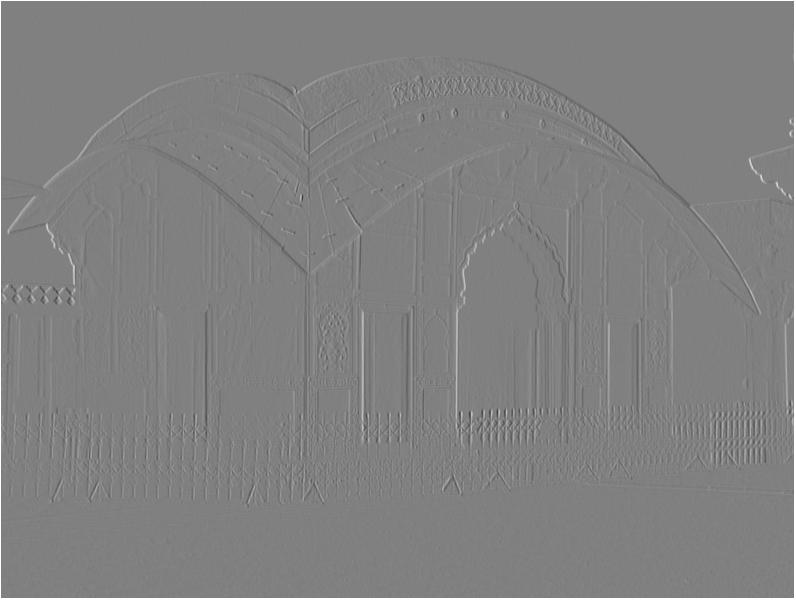
Image filtered with g^{(3)}

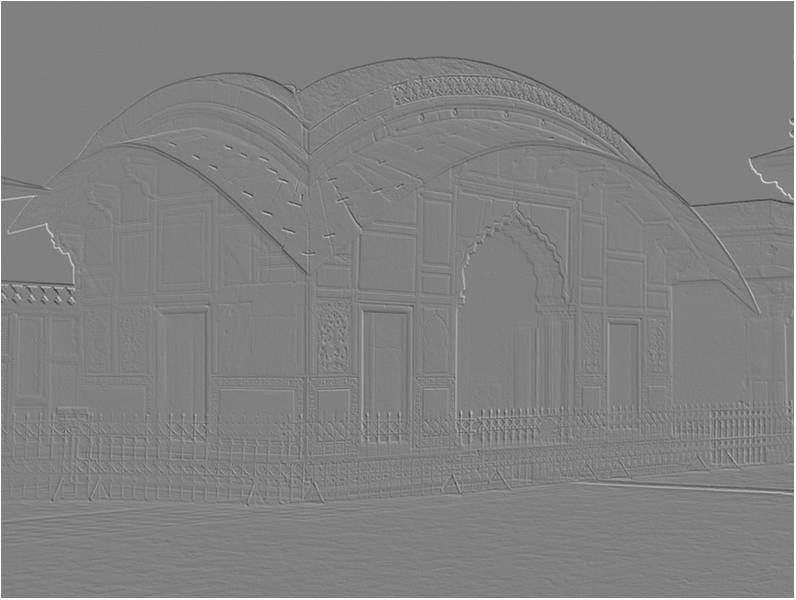
Image filtered with g^{(4)}
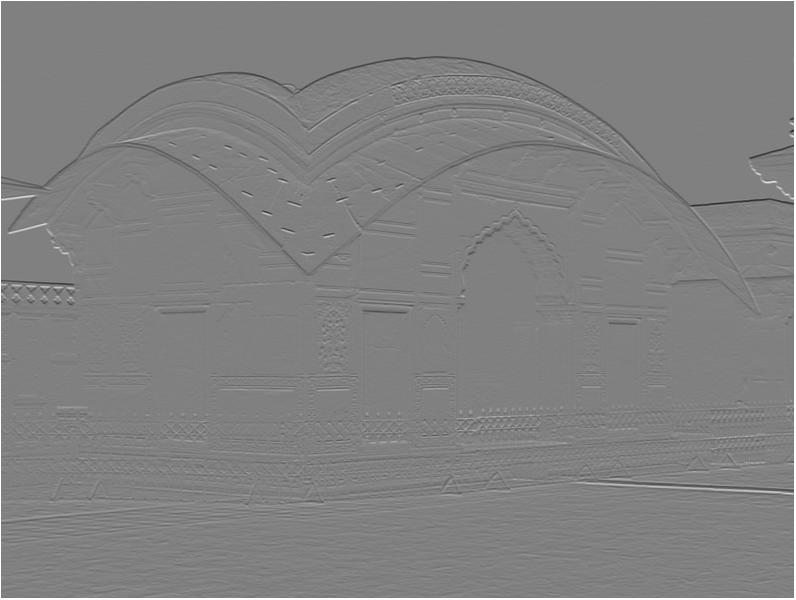
Image filtered with g^{(5)}

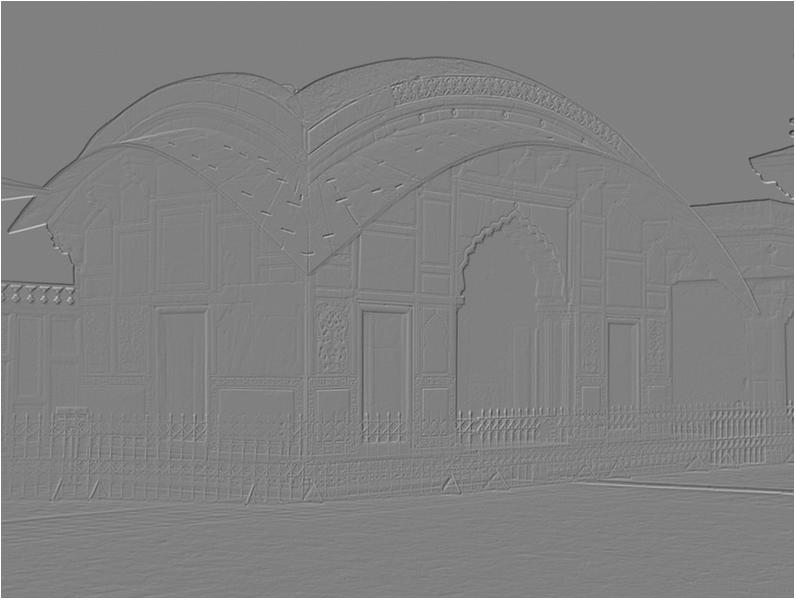
Image filtered with g^{(6)}

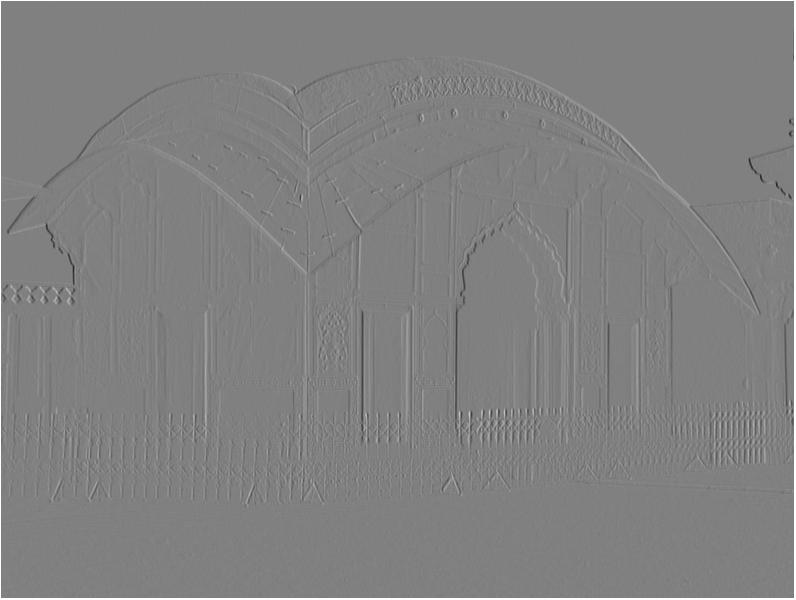
Image filtered with g^{(7)}

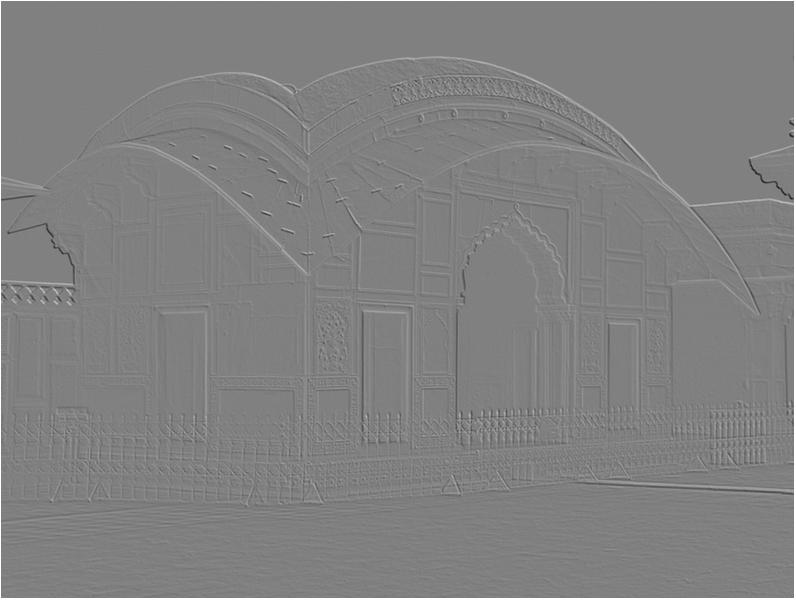
Image filtered with g^{(8)}
