= Angela von Nowakonski =

Brazilian physician (1953–2020)

- Born: 2 February 1953; Brazil
- Died: 17 July 2020 (aged 67); Campinas, São Paulo, Brazil

Angela von Nowakonski (2 February 1953 – 17 July 2020) was a Brazilian physician, researcher and professor at the Institute of Clinical Pathology at the University of Campinas (Unicamp).

== Biography ==
Nowakonski graduated in medicine at Unicamp, specializing in clinical pathology with residency at Hospital das Clínicas, University of São Paulo (USP) and residency in clinical microbiology at the University of Toronto, Canada. Back to Unicamp, she earned the title of Master in Clinical Pathology. From 1987 onwards, she served as head of the Clinical Microbiology Sector, Clinical Pathology Division of the Clinics Hospital at Unicamp, being responsible for medical training in microbiology for residents of Clinical Pathology and Infectology.

In 1992, Nowakonski was one of the founding members of the Campinas Chapter of the São Paulo Association for the Study and Control of Hospital Infection (Associação Paulista de Estudos e Controle de Infecção Hospitalar - APECIH).

Nowakonski had had leukemia for a few years, although she lived a normal life. She had retired from Unicamp and worked for two private clinical analysis laboratories in the city of Campinas. However, she contracted the COVID-19 during the COVID-19 pandemic in Brazil and was hospitalized for about two weeks at the Hospital of the Pontifical Catholic University of Campinas. She died on 17 July 2020, at the age of 67.

== Bibliography ==
=== Books ===
- NOWAKONSKI, Angela von. Microbiologia Clínica para o Controle de Infecção Relacionada à Assistência à Saúde. Módulo 4. Agência Nacional de Vigilância Sanitária. 2010.

=== Papers ===
Selected articles co-authored by Nowakonski:

- Semiquantitative culture in diagnosing venous catheter-related sepsis (1992)
- Listeriosis and AIDS: Case report and literature review (1992)
- Relative frequency of nosocomial microorganisms at UNICAMP University Hospital from 1987 to 1994 (1997)
- Molecular epidemiology of a nosocomial outbreak due to Enterobacter cloacae and Enterobacter agglomerans in Campinas, São Paulo, Brazil (2000)
- Nested-PCR using MPB64 fragment improves the diagnosis of pleural and meningeal tuberculosis (2000)
- Enterobacter cloacae sepsis outbreak in a newborn unit caused by contaminated total parenteral nutrition solution (2000)
- Reduction in colonization and nosocomial infection by multiresistant bacteria in a neonatal unit after institution of educational measures and restriction in the use of cephalosporins (2001)
- Diagnostic investigation of ventilator-associated pneumonia using bronchoalveolar lavage: Comparative study with a postmortem lung biopsy (2001)
- Nasal MRSA colonization of AIDS patients cared for in a Brazilian university hospital (2002)
- Evaluation of Fusarium solani Hyphae and Conidia susceptibility to Amphotericin B and Itraconazole: Study of a clinical case (2005)
- Low prevalence of vancomycin resistant enterococci colonization in intensive care patients in a Brazilian teaching hospital (2006)
- Arcanobacterium pyogenes sepsis in farmer, Brazil (2009)
- Controlling a vancomycin-resistant enterococci outbreak in a Brazilian teaching hospital (2010)
- Microbiological characteristics of sepsis in a university hospital (2015)
