= Zhang Zongsui =

- 张宗燧
- Born: 1 June 1915; Hangzhou, Zhejiang, China
- Died: 30 June 1969 (aged 54); Beijing, China
- Education: Tsinghua University; University of Cambridge
- Scientific career
- Fields: Statistical physics Quantum mechanics
- Workplaces: Chinese Academy of Sciences (CAS)
- Doctoral advisor: Ralph H. Fowler
- Other academic advisors: Wolfgang Pauli
- Notable students: Yu Min

Chinese name
- Traditional Chinese: 張宗燧
- Simplified Chinese: 张宗燧
Transcriptions
Standard Mandarin
- Hanyu Pinyin: Zhāng Zōngsuì

Zhang Zongsui (Chinese: 张宗燧; 1 June 1915 – 30 June 1969) was a Chinese physicist and an academician of the Chinese Academy of Sciences (CAS).

== Biography ==
Zhang was born in Hangzhou, Zhejiang, on 1 June 1915, to Zhang Dongsun, a philosopher and social activist, and Wu Shaohong (Chinese: 吴绍鸿). His elder brother Zhang Zongbing (Chinese: 张宗炳) was an entomologist. His younger brother Zhang Zongying (Chinese: 张宗颖) and younger sister Zhang Zongye are physicists. In 1930, he was accepted to the Yenching University, at the next year, he was transferred to Tsinghua University, where he studied physics under Wu Youxun and Chung-Yao Chao. After university, he worked in the Purple Mountain Observatory. In 1937 he pursued advanced studies in the UK, earning his PhD from the University of Cambridge under Ralph H. Fowler. Then he worked in the Niels Bohr Institute under the leadership of Niels Bohr. In 1939 he came to the ETH Zurich, working with Wolfgang Pauli.

Zhang returned to China in 1939 and that same year became a professor at the National Central University. In 1945 he became a senior research fellow at the University of Cambridge. In 1947 he worked in Princeton University. In 1951 he worked in the Chinese Academy of Sciences (CAS). He was elected an academician of the Chinese Academy of Sciences in 1957.

On 30 June 1969, he was persecuted to death by the Red Guards at the dawn of the Cultural Revolution.
