= NGC 4567 and NGC 4568 =

Interacting galaxy pair in the constellation Virgo

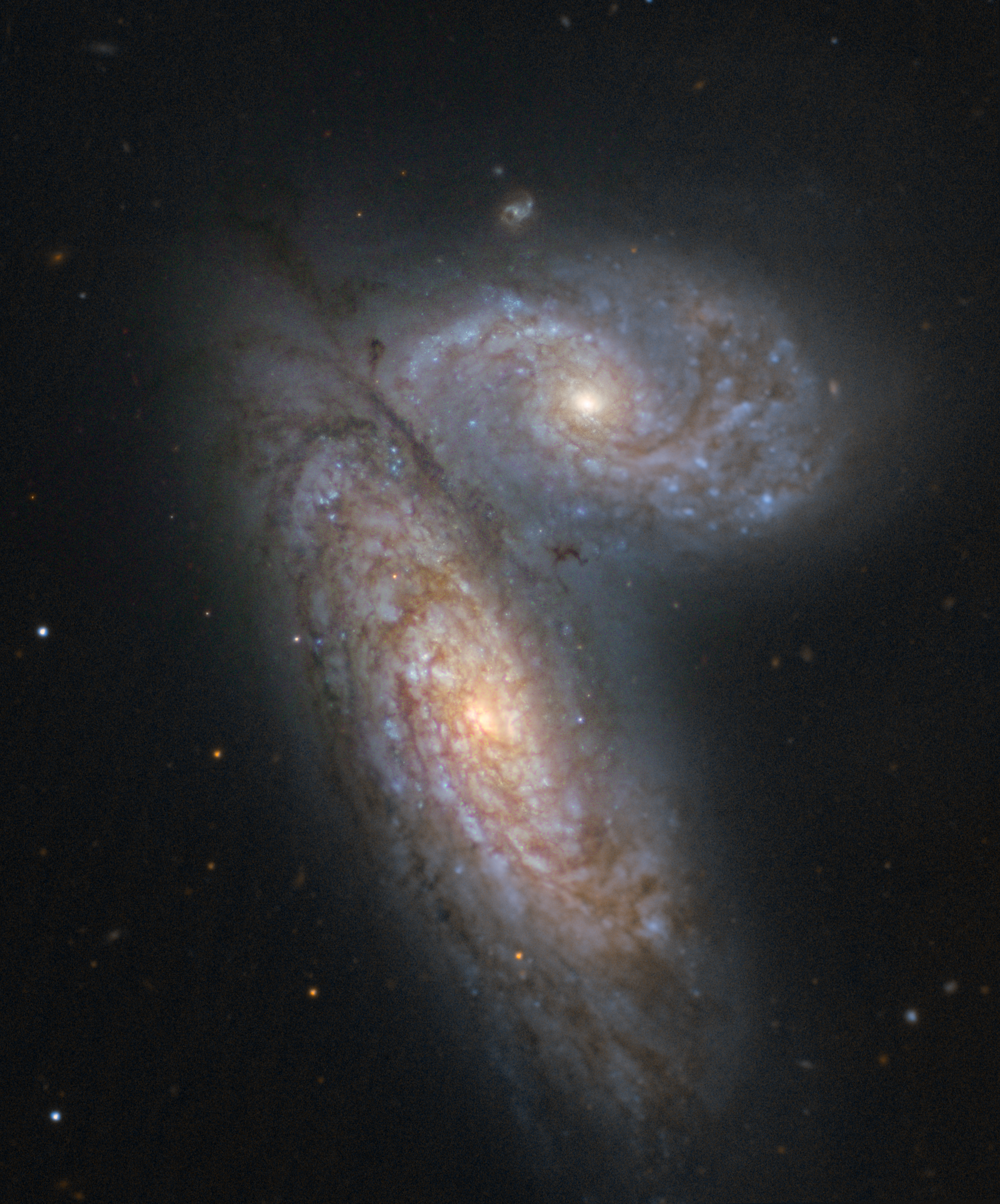
- The Butterfly Galaxies with NGC 4567 (top) and NGC 4568 (bottom)

Observation data (J2000.0 epoch)
- Constellation: Virgo
- Right ascension: 12^{h} 36^{m} 34.3^{s}
- Declination: +11° 14′ 17″
- Distance: 62 Mly (19.1 Mpc)
- Apparent magnitude (V): +10.9
- Absolute magnitude (V): -13.3

Characteristics
- Type: SA(rs)bc / SA(rs)bc
- Apparent size (V): 4.6′ × 2.1′
- Notable features: colliding galaxies

Other designations
- NGC 4567/8, UGC 7776/7, PGC 42064/9, VV 219, KPG 347, Butterfly Galaxies, Siamese Twin Galaxies, Siamese Twins Galaxies, Siamese Twins (Note: NASA no longer uses the "Siamese Twins" terms due to perceived discriminatory naming)

NGC 4567 and NGC 4568 (nicknamed the Butterfly Galaxies or Siamese Twins) are a set of unbarred spiral galaxies about 60 million light-years away in the constellation Virgo. They were both discovered by William Herschel in 1784. They are part of the Virgo Cluster of galaxies.

These galaxies are in the process of colliding and merging with each other, as studies of their distributions of neutral and molecular hydrogen show, with the highest star-formation activity in the part where they overlap. However, the system is still in an early phase of interaction. In about 500 million years the galaxies will coalesce into a single elliptical galaxy.

== Supernovae ==
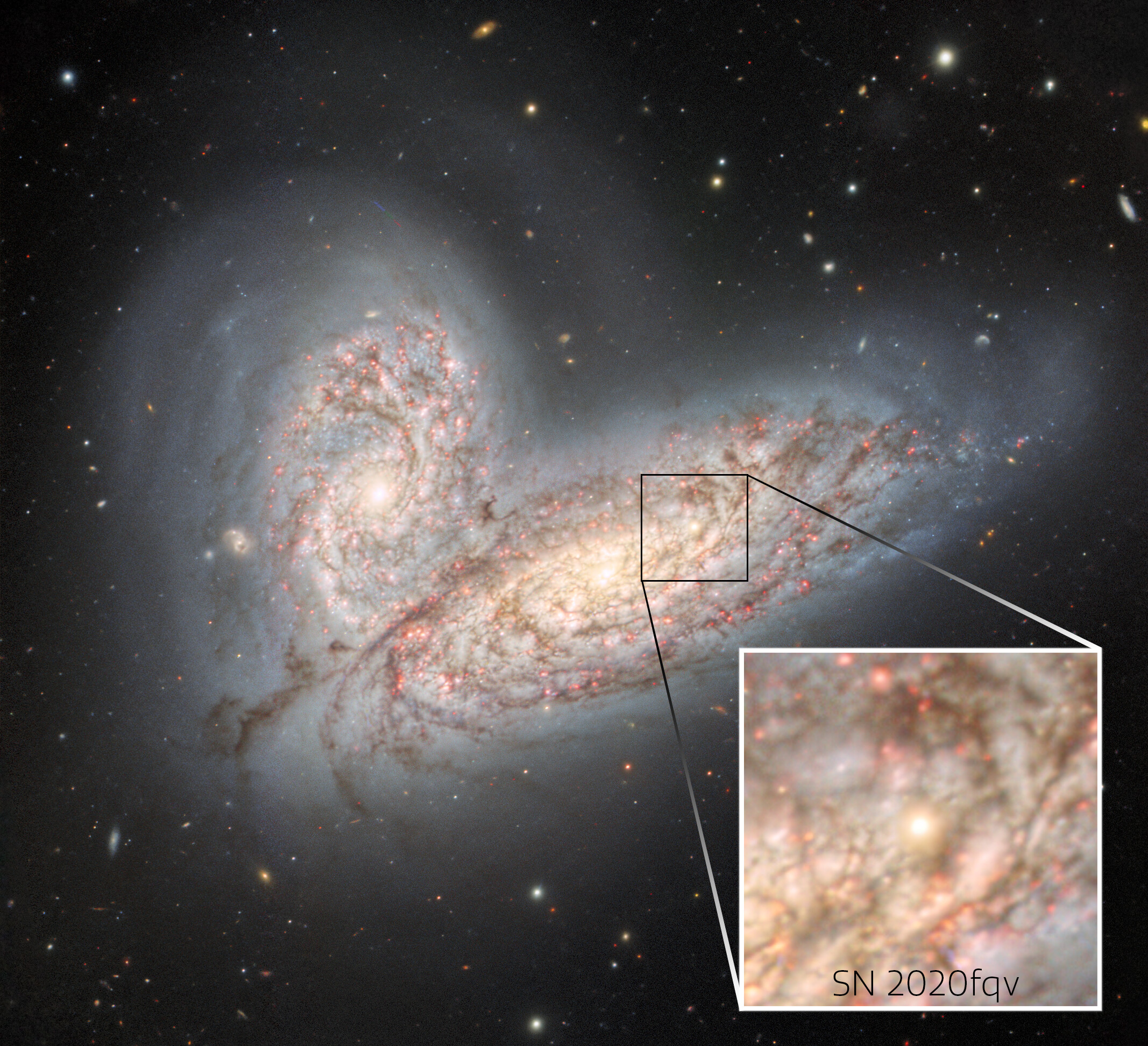
SN 2020fqv shown in NGC 4568

Four supernovae have been observed in the Butterfly Galaxies:

- SN 1990B (Type Ib, mag. 16) was discovered by Saul Perlmutter and Carlton Pennypacker on 20 January 1990.
- SN 2004cc (Type Ic, mag. 17.5) was discovered by the Lick Observatory Supernova Search (LOSS) on 10 June 2004.
- SN 2020fqv (Type IIb, mag. 19) was discovered by the Automatic Learning for the Rapid Classification of Events (ALeRCE) on 31 March 2020.
- SN 2023ijd (Type II, mag. 16.8) was discovered by ASAS-SN on 14 May 2023.

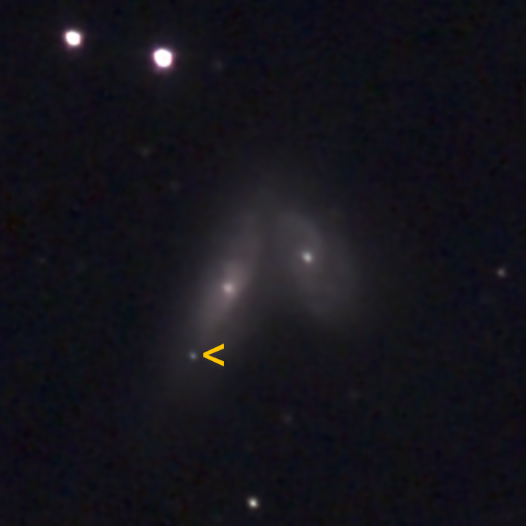
SN 2023idj in NGC 4568 as seen on 2023-May-17.

== Naming controversy ==
The two galaxies were nicknamed "Siamese Twins" because they appear to be connected. On August 5, 2020, NASA announced that they would not use that nickname in an effort to avoid systemic discrimination in their terminology.

== See also ==
- Antennae Galaxies
- Eyes Galaxies
