= Russell Kirsch =

American computer scientist (1929–2020)

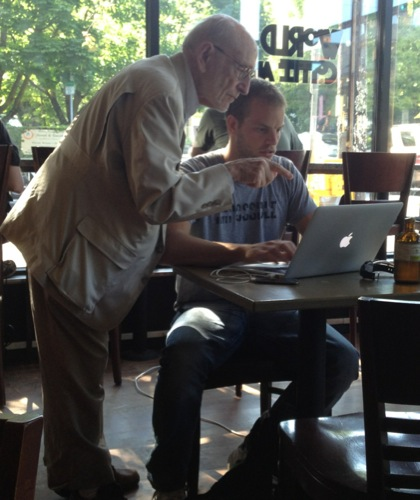
- Kirsch (left) in Portland, Oregon with Joel Runyon in 2012
- Born: June 20, 1929; Manhattan, New York, U.S.
- Died: August 11, 2020 (aged 91); Portland, Oregon, U.S.
- Education: Bronx High School of Science (1946), BEE New York University (1950), SM Harvard University (1952), American University, Massachusetts Institute of Technology
- Occupation: Computer scientist
- Known for: First digital image scanner
- Spouse: Joan (née Levin) Kirsch
- Children: Walden Kirsch (KGW reporter), 3 other children

Russell A. Kirsch (June 20, 1929 – August 11, 2020) was an American engineer at the National Bureau of Standards (now known as the National Institute of Standards and Technology). He was recognized as the developer of the first digital image scanner, and subsequently scanned the world's first digital photograph – an image of his infant son.

== Early life ==
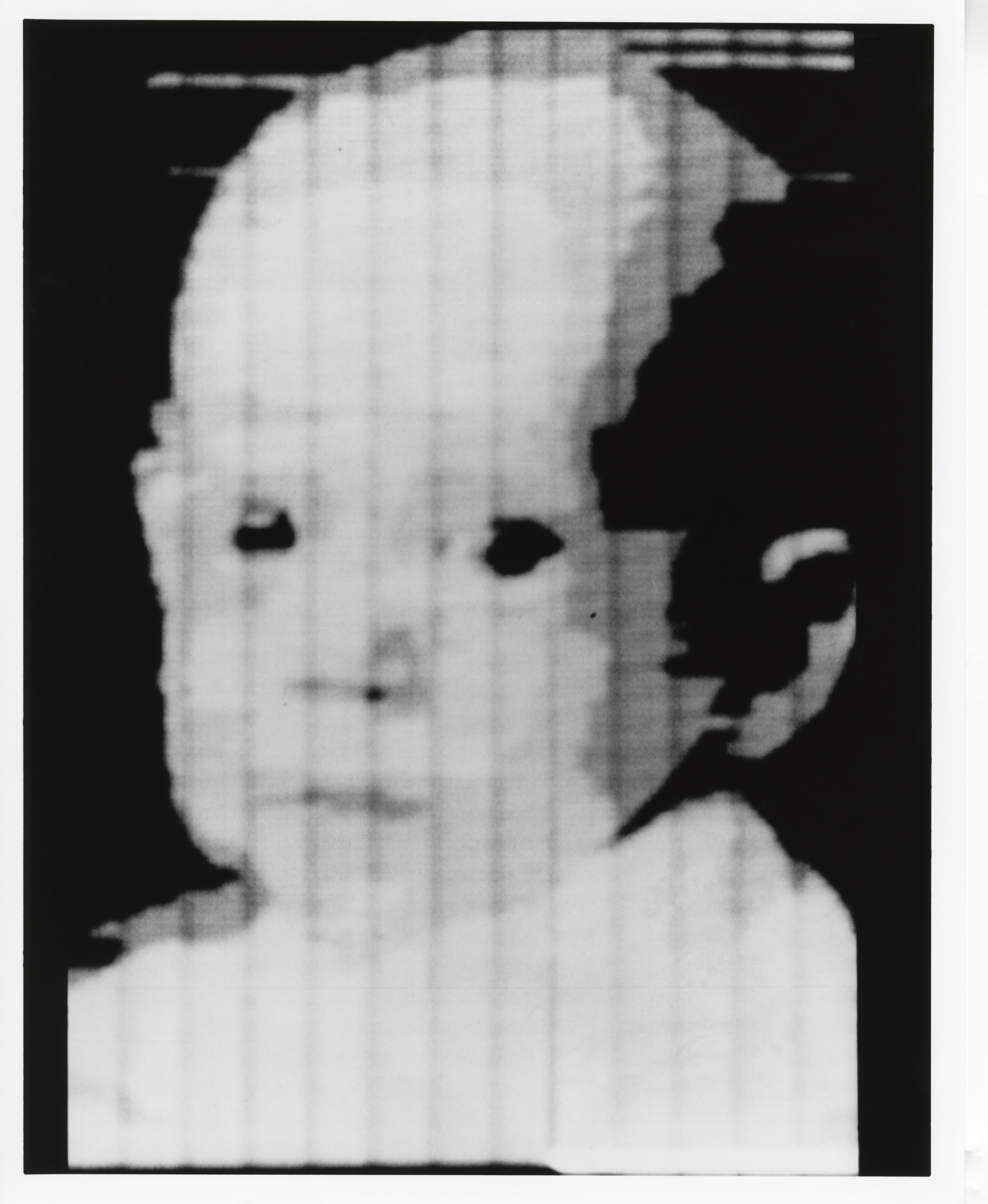
Russell Kirsch created the first digitally scanned image in 1957, depicting his three-month-old son Walden.

Kirsch was born in Manhattan on June 20, 1929. His parents were Jewish emigrants from Russia and Hungary. He attended the Bronx High School of Science, graduating in 1946. He continued his education at New York University in 1950, Harvard University in 1952, and later the Massachusetts Institute of Technology.

== Career ==
In 1951 Kirsch joined the National Bureau of Standards as part of the team that ran SEAC (Standards Eastern Automatic Computer). SEAC was the U.S.'s first stored-program computer to become operational, having entered service in 1950.

In 1957, Kirsch's group developed a digital image scanner, to "trace variations of intensity over the surfaces of photographs", and made the first digital scans. One of the first photographs scanned, a picture of Kirsch's three-month-old son, was captured as just 30,976 pixels, a 176 × 176 array, in an area 5 cm × 5 cm (2" x 2"). The bit depth was only one bit per pixel, stark black and white with no intermediate shades of gray, but, by combining several scans made using different scanning thresholds, grayscale information could also be acquired. They used the computer to extract line drawings, count objects, recognize alphanumeric characters, and produce oscilloscope displays. He also proposed the Kirsch operator for edge detection in images.

Later in life, Kirsch became the director of research of the Sturvil Corporation and an advisory editor for the Institute of Electrical and Electronics Engineers (IEEE). He was the advisory editor of the journal Languages of Design.

== Personal life and death ==
Kirsch was married to Joan (née Levin) Kirsch for 65 years until his death. Together, they had four children: Walden, Peter, Lindsey, and Kara. Kirsch spent most of his professional life in Washington, D.C., where he was affiliated with the National Bureau of Standards for nearly 50 years. He moved to Portland, Oregon, in 2001 after his retirement.

Kirsch died on August 11, 2020, at his home in Portland at age 91. Kirsch's cause of death was frontotemporal dementia, a form of Alzheimer's disease, according to his son Walden.

== Accomplishments ==
In 2003, Kirsch's scanned picture of his son was named by Life magazine one of the "100 Photographs That Changed the World" due to its importance in the development of digital photography. The original image is in the Portland Art Museum. Although Kirsch did not work for NASA, his invention led to technology crucial to space exploration, including the Apollo Moon landing. Medical advancements such as Sir Godfrey Hounsfield’s CAT scan can also be attributed to Kirsch's research.

== See also ==
- Digitization
- List of pioneers in computer science
