= Tong Binggang =

Chinese physicist (1927–2020)

- 童秉纲
- Born: September 28, 1927; Yangshe Town, Zhangjiagang, Jiangsu, China
- Died: July 9, 2020 (aged 92); Beijing, China
- Education: National Central University; Harbin Institute of Technology
- Scientific career
- Fields: Fluid mechanics
- Workplaces: Chinese Academy of Sciences (CAS)

Chinese name
- Traditional Chinese: 童秉綱
- Simplified Chinese: 童秉纲
Transcriptions
Standard Mandarin
- Hanyu Pinyin: Tóng Bǐnggāng

Tong Binggang (Chinese: 童秉纲; September 28, 1927 – July 9, 2020) was a Chinese physicist. He was an academician of the Chinese Academy of Sciences (CAS).

== Biography ==
Tong was born in the town of Yangshe, Zhangjiagang, Jiangsu, on September 28, 1927. In 1946 he entered National Central University, majoring in mechanics. In 1953 he earned a master's degree in mechanics from Harbin Institute of Technology. After graduation, he taught at the university. In 1956, because of his comments on the then deputy dean of Harbin Institute of Technology, Tong was criticized and punished for five years. During the Cultural Revolution, he was labeled as a "Rightist" and was jailed for one year and reformed through labor for two and a half years. In 1961, he was transferred to the University of Science and Technology of China, where he was promoted to full professor in 1981. On July 9, 2020, He died on 9 July 2020 in Beijing.

== Honours and awards ==
- 1997 Member of the Chinese Academy of Sciences (CAS)
- 2002 Science and Technology Progress Award of the Ho Leung Ho Lee Foundation
