= Tim Clark (physician) =

British physician (1935–2020)

Professor Tim Clark FRCP
- Born: 1935
- Died: 14 July 2020 (aged 84)

Tim Clark FRCP (1935 – 14 July 2020) was a British physician, specialising in pulmonary medicine.

Clark qualified in medicine in 1961 and worked as a consultant physician at Guy's Hospital from 1968 to 1990. He then moved to the Royal Brompton Hospital from 1970 to 1998.

He was dean of the United Medical and Dental Schools of Guy's and St Thomas' Hospital, then dean of the National Heart and Lung Institute.

He was Professor of Pulmonary Medicine at Imperial College, London, from 1990 and was its pro-rector from 1995 to 1997 as well as provost of Imperial College at Wye from 2000.

He served as president of the British Thoracic Society from 1990 to 1991 and as vice-chairman of the National Asthma Campaign from 1992 to 2000.

He died on 14 July 2020 at the age of 84.
