= Deaths in September 2020 =

The following is a list of notable deaths in September 2020.

Entries for each day are listed alphabetically by surname. A typical entry lists information in the following sequence:

- Name, age, country of citizenship at birth, subsequent country of citizenship (if applicable), reason for notability, cause of death (if known), and reference.

== September 2020 ==
=== 1 ===
- Wick Allison, 72, American magazine publisher (National Review, The American Conservative) and author, bladder cancer.
- Nada Birko, 89, Croatian Olympic skier (1952).
- Joseph H. Connell, 96, American ecologist.
- Edwin M. Cronk, 102, American diplomat, Ambassador to Singapore (1972–1975).
- Délio dos Santos, 95, Brazilian pro-democracy lawyer and politician, Deputy (1979–1987), pneumonia.
- Arnold Frutkin, 101, American aerospace administrator.
- Shekhar Gawli, 45, Indian cricketer (Maharashtra), fall.
- Melanie Wade Goodwin, 50, American politician, member of the North Carolina House of Representatives (2005–2011), cancer.
- Vic Heron, 81–82, Australian politician.
- Shanna Hogan, 37, American author, drowned.
- Sheila Ingram, 63, American Olympic runner, silver medallist (1976).
- James Jackson, 76, American social psychologist.
- Jimmy Janes, 73, American comic book artist (Legion of Super-Heroes) and animator (Teenage Mutant Ninja Turtles, X-Men: The Animated Series).
- John Joseph, 97, Iraqi-born American historian.
- Dianne Kirksey, 69–70, American actress and director.
- Boris Klyuyev, 76, Russian actor (D'Artagnan and Three Musketeers, The Adventures of Sherlock Holmes and Dr. Watson, TASS Is Authorized to Declare...), People's Artist (2002), lung cancer.
- Vladislav Krapivin, 81, Russian children's author, pneumonia.
- François Lalande, 89, Algerian-born French actor (Herbie Goes to Monte Carlo, French Postcards, Dangerous Liaisons).
- Moose Lallo, 95, Canadian ice hockey player (Muskegon Zephyrs, Grand Rapids Rockets, Washington Presidents).
- Erick Morillo, 49, American DJ (Reel 2 Real), music producer and record label owner, acute ketamine toxicity.
- John Najarian, 92, American transplant surgeon.
- Sue C. Nichols, 55, American animator and screenwriter (The Lion King, The Hunchback of Notre Dame, Aladdin), cancer.
- Terje Steen, 76, Norwegian Olympic ice hockey player (1968, 1972), national team.
- Thomas L. Steffen, 90, American jurist, Justice (1982–1997) and Chief Justice (1995–1997) of the Supreme Court of Nevada.
- Lyndon Stevens, 79, Australian cricket umpire.
- Jerzy Szczakiel, 71, Polish speedway rider, world champion (1973).
- James A. Taylor, 92, Canadian politician, Ontario MPP (1971–1987).

=== 2 ===
- Abdúl Aramayo, 86, Bolivian footballer (Chaco Petrolero, Bolívar, national team).
- Georges Azenstarck, 85–86, French photographer.
- Danie Brits, 55, South African professional wrestler, heart attack.
- David Capel, 57, English cricketer (Northamptonshire, national team), brain tumour.
- Albert Cheesebrough, 85, English footballer (Burnley, Leicester City, Port Vale).
- Philippe Daverio, 70, French-born Italian art critic, gallerist, academic, and television presenter, cancer.
- Fred Davies, 81, English football player (Wolverhampton Wanderers, Bournemouth) and manager (Shrewsbury Town), idiopathic pulmonary fibrosis.
- Jon Dooley, 74, British racing driver.
- Stephen M. Drance, 95, Canadian ophthalmologist.
- Datta Ekbote, 84, Indian activist and politician, mayor of Pune, COVID-19.
- David Evans, 95, Australian RAAF Air Marshal, Chief of the Air Staff (1982–1985).
- Takashi Furuya, 84, Japanese saxophonist, pneumonia.
- M. J. Appaji Gowda, 69, Indian politician, Karnataka MLC (2013–2018), COVID-19.
- David Graeber, 59, American anthropologist and author (Bullshit Jobs, Debt: The First 5000 Years, The Utopia of Rules), internal bleeding.
- Ted Halstead, 52, American climatologist and author, fall.
- Clyde H. Hamilton, 86, American jurist, Judge of the D.S.C. (1981–1991) and Judge of the U.S. Court of Appeals for the Fourth Circuit (since 1991).
- Rinat Ibragimov, 59, Russian double bass player, COVID-19.
- Irving Kanarek, 100, American defense attorney (Charles Manson, Jimmy Lee Smith).
- Kang Kek Iew, 77, Cambodian internal security leader (Tuol Sleng, Santebal) and convicted war criminal, lung disease.
- Royce R. Lewellen, 89, American judge.
- Christian Liaigre, 77, French architect and interior designer.
- Esther McCready, 89, American nurse.
- Ismail Molla, 82, Greek politician, MP (1989–1990), stroke.
- Maria Celeste Nardini, 77, Italian politician.
- Carol Braun Pasternack, 70, American literary historian, brain cancer.
- Ramkrishna Baba Patil, 84, Indian politician, MP (1998–2004) and Maharashtra MLA (1985–1995), complications from diabetes.
- Mark Prent, 72, Canadian-American sculptor, aortic aneurysm.
- Agustín Roberto Radrizzani, 75, Argentine Roman Catholic prelate, Bishop of Neuquén (1991–2001) and Lomas de Zamora (2001–2007), Archbishop of Mercedes-Luján (2007–2019), COVID-19.
- Serara Selelo-Mogwe, 93, Botswana nurse and academic.
- Wanda Seux, 72, Paraguayan-Argentine-Mexican vedette and actress (La vida difícil de una mujer fácil, Spicy Chile, Paradas Contínuas), complications from multiple strokes.
- John Shrapnell, 85, British-born New Zealand journalist, actor and singer.
- Adrianus Johannes Simonis, 88, Dutch Roman Catholic cardinal, Archbishop of Utrecht (1983–2007).
- Norman J. W. Thrower, 100, English-born American cartographer and scholar.
- František Vaněk, 88, Czech Olympic ice hockey player (1956, 1960).
- John Yates, 90, English footballer (Chester).
- William Yorzyk, 87, American Hall of Fame swimmer, Olympic champion (1956).
- Gerry Young, 83, English footballer (Sheffield Wednesday).
- Dave Zeller, 81, American basketball player (Cincinnati Royals).

=== 3 ===
- Kathleen Byerly, 76, American U.S Navy captain, cancer.
- Betty Caywood, 89, American sportscaster (Kansas City Athletics).
- Michael J. Cleary, 95, Irish Roman Catholic prelate, Bishop of Banjul (1981–2006).
- Antônio de Jesus Dias, 78, Brazilian pastor and politician, Deputy (1987–1991, 1991–1993), COVID-19.
- Alércio Dias, 77, Brazilian lawyer and politician, Deputy (1983–1991), gastrointestinal complications.
- Dito, 58, Portuguese football player (Braga, Benfica, national team) and manager, heart attack.
- Bernard Edelman, 82, French jurist, lawyer, and philosopher.
- Karel Knesl, 78, Czech footballer (Dukla Prague, Slavia Prague, Czechoslovakia national team), Olympic silver medallist (1964).
- Dorothea Liebermann-Meffert, 90, German surgeon.
- Mary Marzke, 83, American anthropologist.
- Jean-François Poron, 84, French actor (The Air of Paris, A Captain's Honor).
- Bill Pursell, 94, American composer ("Our Winter Love"), pianist and music teacher, COVID-19.
- Ahmed Al-Qadri, 64, Syrian agricultural engineer, Minister of Agriculture and Agrarian Reform (2013–2020), COVID-19.
- Elkin Reilly, 81, Australian footballer (South Melbourne).
- Gianni Serra, 86, Italian film director and screenwriter.
- Félix Suárez Colomo, 69, Spanish Olympic racing cyclist (1972).
- Reinhard Theimer, 72, German Olympic hammer thrower (1968, 1972).
- Birol Ünel, 59, Turkish-born German actor (Head-On, Transylvania, Enemy at the Gates), cancer.

=== 4 ===
- Vince Agro, 83, Canadian politician and novelist.
- Bryan Anderson, 78, Canadian politician.
- Ajibade Babalade, 48, Nigerian footballer (Shooting Stars, national team), cardiac arrest.
- Sir Simon Boyle, 79, British business executive and public servant, Lord Lieutenant of Gwent (2001–2016).
- Lloyd Cadena, 26, Filipino YouTuber, COVID-19.
- Mike Cooley, 86, Irish engineer and trade unionist.
- Annie Cordy, 92, Belgian actress (Victor and Victoria, Ces dames s'en mêlent, Souvenir of Gibraltar) and singer, cardiac arrest.
- Peter Cronjé, 70, South African rugby union player (Golden Lions, national team), cancer.
- Gregory de Vink, 22, South African racing cyclist, traffic collision.
- John S. Dugdale, 86, New Zealand entomologist.
- Leon Finney Jr., 82, American minister and community organizer.
- Andrzej Gawroński, 85, Polish actor (Everything for Sale, How I Unleashed World War II, A Short Film About Killing).
- Nandi Glassie, 69, Cook Islands politician, MP (2006–2018), cancer.
- Tony Goolsby, 86, American politician, cancer.
- Khanifa Iskandarova, 92, Russian educator.
- Gary Peacock, 85, American jazz double-bassist.
- Fortunato Perri, 83, American politician.
- Curtis S. Person Jr., 85, American politician, member of the Tennessee House of Representatives (1966–1968) and Senate (1968–2006).
- Betty Petryna, 89, Canadian baseball player (Grand Rapids Chicks, Fort Wayne Daisies).
- Pierre Sidos, 93, French neo-Pétainist and political activist, founder of Jeune Nation.
- Lucille Starr, 82, Canadian singer ("Cajun Love").
- Dmitry Svetushkin, 40, Moldovan chess grandmaster, suicide by jumping.
- Carl-Henning Wijkmark, 85, Swedish novelist (Stundande natten).
- Joe Williams, 85, Cook Islands politician, Prime Minister (1999), Minister of Foreign Affairs (1999) and MP (1994–2004), COVID-19.

=== 5 ===
- Beatrice Allard, 90, American baseball player (Muskegon Lassies).
- Dwight Anderson, 59, American basketball player (Denver Nuggets, Albuquerque Silvers, Evansville Thunder).
- Johnny Bakshi, 88, Indian film producer, director (Raavan, Khudai) and actor, heart attack.
- Orly Bauzon, 75, Filipino Olympic basketball player (1968), cardiac arrest.
- Jim Buick, 79, American racing driver.
- Rich Buzin, 74, American football player (New York Giants, Los Angeles Rams).
- Zelmar Casco, 94, Argentine Olympic fencer (1964).
- Francis Chapman, 97, Canadian cinematographer and television director.
- Abu Osman Chowdhury, 85, Bangladeshi resistance fighter (Mukti Bahini).
- Žarko Domljan, 87, Croatian politician, Speaker of the Parliament (1990–1992).
- Christy Elliot, 87, Scottish rugby player.
- Smokey Gaines, 80, American basketball player (Kentucky Colonels) and coach (Detroit Titans, San Diego State Aztecs), cancer.
- Marian Jaworski, 94, Polish Roman Catholic cardinal, Archbishop of Lviv of the Latins (1991–2008).
- Mohamed Haytham Khayat, 83, Syrian physician and lexicographer.
- Jimmy Lavin, 92, Irish Gaelic footballer and hurler.
- Rodney Litchfield, 81, English actor (Early Doors, Coronation Street, Testimony).
- Thandeka Mdeliswa, 34, South African actress (Generations: The Legacy, Isidingo, Rhythm City), shot.
- Jiří Menzel, 82, Czech director, actor and screenwriter (Closely Watched Trains, My Sweet Little Village, Larks on a String), Oscar winner (1967).
- Steve Merrill, 74, American politician, Governor (1993–1997) and Attorney General of New Hampshire (1985–1989).
- Frédéric Musso, 79, Algerian-born French writer and poet.
- Brigitte Peskine, 68, French author and screenwriter (Plus belle la vie, Candice Renoir).
- Ethan Peters, 17, American beauty influencer, drug overdose.
- Malka Ribowska, 89, Polish-born French actress (Sundays and Cybele, The Shameless Old Lady).
- Antoine Rufenacht, 81, French politician, mayor of Le Havre (1995–2010), President of the Regional Council of Upper Normandy (1992–1998).
- Tam Ping-man, 86, Hong Kong actor (Exiled, Wild City, House of Wolves).
- Yousef Wali, 90, Egyptian politician, Minister of Agriculture and Land Reclamation (1982–2004).
- David Walter, 80, New Zealand politician, mayor of Stratford (1989–1998), leukaemia.
- Al G. Wright, 104, English-born American band director (Purdue All-American Marching Band).

=== 6 ===
- Levon Altounian, 84, Lebanese footballer (Homenetmen, national team).
- Sergey Belyayev, 60, Kazakh sport shooter, Olympic silver medallist (1996).
- Kesavananda Bharati, 79, Indian civil rights activist (Kesavananda Bharati v. State of Kerala).
- Joan Blackham, 74, English actress (Bridget Jones's Diary, Judge John Deed, Doctors).
- Lou Brock, 81, American Hall of Fame baseball player (Chicago Cubs, St. Louis Cardinals).
- Marco Cariola, 87, Chilean cattle farmer, lawyer and politician, Senator (1998–2006).
- Paul Chittilapilly, 86, Indian Syro-Malabar Catholic hierarch, Bishop of Kalyan (1988–1996) and Thamarassery (1996–2010).
- Achmat Dangor, 71, South African author and political activist.
- Nancy Dine, 83, American filmmaker (Jim Dine: A Self-Portrait on the Walls), lung cancer.
- Kevin Dobson, 77, American actor (Kojak, Knots Landing, Midway), heart attack.
- Christiane Eda-Pierre, 88, French coloratura soprano.
- Lennart Forsberg, 92, Swedish footballer (GIF Sundsvall, Djurgården).
- George Carr Frison, 95, American archaeologist.
- Bob Fujitani, 98, American comic book artist (Flash Gordon, Rip Kirby), co-creator of Solar.
- Dick Gill, 88, Australian footballer (Carlton).
- Isabel Gutiérrez de Bosch, 89, Guatemalan businesswoman and philanthropist.
- Tom Jernstedt, 75, American Hall of Fame basketball administrator.
- Sir Vaughan Jones, 67, New Zealand mathematician (Jones polynomial), Fields Medal winner (1990).
- Gavin Keneally, 86, Australian politician, South Australian MHA (1970–1989).
- Anita Lindblom, 82, Swedish singer and actress.
- Gerry Lynn, 68, American politician, member of the Kentucky House of Representatives (2005–2007).
- Sterling Magee, 84, American blues musician, complications from COVID-19.
- Col Markham, 80, Australian politician, New South Wales MLA (1988–2003).
- Nirvendra Kumar Mishra, 74–76, Indian politician, beaten.
- S. Mohinder, 95, Indian composer (Paapi, Nanak Nam Jahaz Hai) and music director.
- Dragoljub Ojdanić, 79, Serbian military officer and convicted war criminal, Chief of the General Staff (1998–2000) and Minister of Defence of FR Yugoslavia (2000).
- Bob Richardson, 76, American football player (Hamilton Tiger-Cats, Denver Broncos).
- Bob Robertson, 91, American sportscaster.
- Mike Sexton, 72, American Hall of Fame poker player and commentator, prostate cancer.
- Catana Starks, 75, American golfing coach.
- Lotte Strauss, 107, German-born American author.
- Takashi Sugimura, 94, Japanese biochemist, heart failure.
- Helen Taylor Thompson, 96, British aid worker.
- Ethel Soliven Timbol, 80, Filipino journalist (Manila Bulletin).
- Dickson Wamwiri, 35, Kenyan Olympic taekwondo practitioner (2008).
- Bruce Williamson, 49, American singer (The Temptations), COVID-19.
- Kevin Zeese, 64, American lawyer and political activist, heart attack.

=== 7 ===
- Berni Alder, 94, German-born American physicist.
- Abdul Qadir Bajamal, 74, Yemeni politician, Prime Minister (2001–2007) and Minister of Foreign Affairs (1998–2001), complications from multiple strokes.
- Chen Dingchang, 83, Chinese aerospace engineer, member of the Chinese Academy of Sciences.
- Kate Daw, 55, Australian visual artist.
- Abdul Malik Fadjar, 81, Indonesian politician and academic, Minister of Religious Affairs (1998–1999) and Education (2001–2004).
- Gao Wenbin, 99, Chinese historian and jurist.
- Aurelio Iragorri Hormaza, 83, Colombian politician, Senator (1991–2014), Governor of Cauca (1975–1976) and President of the Chamber of Representatives (1981–1982), COVID-19.
- John Houska, 64, American soccer player (Memphis Rogues).
- Aida Kamel, 89, Egyptian actress.
- Sergey Koltakov, 64, Russian actor (Mirror for a Hero, New Adventures of a Yankee in King Arthur's Court, The Life of Klim Samgin).
- Logie Bruce Lockhart, 98, Scottish rugby union player (national team), writer and journalist.
- Paul E. Menoher, 81, American lieutenant general.
- Tim Mulherin, 63, Australian politician, Queensland MP (1995–2015), cancer.
- Xavier Ortiz, 48, Mexican actor (Journey from the Fall, Un gancho al corazón), singer (Garibaldi) and television host, suicide by hanging.
- Luba Perchyshyn, 96, American folk artist.
- André Reichling, 64, Luxembourgish conductor and composer ("The NATO Hymn").
- Narendra Kumar Swain, 80, Indian politician, MP (2015–2020).
- Govind Swarup, 91, Indian radio astronomer.
- Patrick Sweeney, 81, American politician, member of the Ohio House of Representatives (1967–1997) and Senate (1997–1998).
- Mir Haji Muhammad Hayat Khan Talpur, 83, Pakistani politician, Sindh MPA (2013–2018).
- Patricia Thiel, 67, American chemist and materials scientist.
- Luis Zárate, 79, Mexican Olympic cyclist (1960).

=== 8 ===
- Sonia Anderson, 76, British archivist, cancer.
- Elgar Baeza, 80, Uruguayan footballer.
- Jean-Léon Beauvois, 77, French psychologist.
- Gene Budig, 81, American academic and baseball executive, Chancellor of KU (1980–1994), president of WVU (1977–1981) and the American League (1994–1999).
- Joseph Chennoth, 76, Indian Syro-Malabar Catholic prelate, Archbishop of Milevum (since 1999) and Apostolic Nuncio to Japan (since 2011).
- Héctor Giorgetti, 64, Argentine footballer (Chacarita Juniors, Estudiantes, Club Universidad de Chile).
- James Greeno, 85, American psychologist.
- Sir Ronald Harwood, 85, South African-born British dramatist and screenwriter (The Pianist, The Dresser, The Diving Bell and the Butterfly), Oscar winner (2003).
- Robert L. Lynn, 88, American poet, President of Louisiana College (1975–1997).
- Anita Mason, 78, English novelist.
- Sally Engle Merry, 75, American anthropologist.
- Jim Owens, 86, American baseball player (Philadelphia Phillies, Cincinnati Reds, Houston Colt .45s/Astros).
- Claude Peretti, 78, French footballer (Monaco, Ajaccio).
- Jaya Prakash Reddy, 73, Indian actor (Samarasimha Reddy, Jayam Manadera, Chennakesava Reddy), cardiac arrest.
- Alfred Riedl, 70, Austrian football player (Standard Liège, national team) and manager (Vietnam national team).
- Vexi Salmi, 77, Finnish lyricist ("Huilumies", "Katson sineen taivaan").
- Jane Soons, 89, British-born New Zealand geomorphologist.
- Yvette Taborin, 91, French archaeologist.
- Tony Tanner, 87, British actor (Stop the World – I Want to Get Off) and theatre director (Joseph and the Amazing Technicolor Dreamcoat).
- Benedict To Varpin, 84, Papua New Guinean Roman Catholic prelate, Bishop of Bereina (1979–1987) and Archbishop of Madang (1987–2001).
- Robert Wilson, 46, American football player (Seattle Seahawks, New Orleans Saints), complications from a stroke.

=== 9 ===
- Elidà Amigó i Montanya, 85, Andorran writer, activist and suffragist.
- Assis, 76, Brazilian footballer (Fluminense, Clube do Remo).
- Ronald Bell, 68, American saxophonist (Kool & the Gang) and songwriter ("Ladies' Night", "Celebration").
- George Bizos, 92, South African human rights lawyer (Rivonia Trial) and anti-apartheid activist.
- Cini Boeri, 96, Italian architect and designer.
- Henrietta Boggs, 102, American-Costa Rican author, journalist and activist, First Lady of Costa Rica (1948–1949), subject of First Lady of the Revolution, COVID-19.
- Sonny Chua, 52, Malaysian-born Australian composer and pianist, stroke.
- Patrick Davin, 58, Belgian orchestra conductor.
- Giuseppe Favero, 88, Italian racing cyclist (1954 Milan–San Remo, 1958 Paris–Nice).
- KS Firoz, 76, Bangladeshi actor (Chandragrohon), complications from COVID-19.
- Arnulfo Fuentebella, 74, Filipino politician, member (1992–2001, 2004–2013, 2016–2019), Deputy Speaker (2007–2013) and Speaker (2000–2001) of the House of Representatives, heart failure.
- Chhetan Gurung, 41, Nepalese film director and screenwriter (November Rain, Damaru Ko Dandibiyo), liver disease.
- Shere Hite, 77, American-born German feminist and sex educator.
- Yopie Latul, 65, Indonesian singer, COVID-19.
- Gienek Loska, 45, Belarusian-born Polish singer-songwriter and guitarist, complications from a stroke.
- Amos Luzzatto, 92, Italian writer and essayist, President of the Union of Italian Jewish Communities (1998–2006).
- Edward J. Mason, 90, American politician.
- Sid McCray, 63, American singer (Bad Brains).
- Alan Minter, 69, British boxer, Olympic bronze medallist (1972) and undisputed world middleweight champion (1980), cancer.
- Nico Naldini, 91, Italian novelist and poet, complications from a fall.
- Jakob Oetama, 88, Indonesian journalist, co-founder of Kompas Gramedia Group and Kompas.
- Peter Sandoval, 73, Guatemalan Olympic footballer.
- Richard A. Smith, 95, American movie theater executive, CEO of General Cinema Corporation (since 1961).
- William D. Smith, 87, American navy admiral.
- Tadeusz Szelachowski, 88, Polish politician and physician, Minister of Health and Social Security (1980–1985), vice-chairman of Council of State and MP (1985–1989).
- Edgard Tupët-Thomé, 100, French Resistance fighter.
- Henry van Ameringen, 89, American philanthropist.
- Tony Villars, 68, Welsh footballer (Cardiff City, Newport County, national team).

=== 10 ===
- Vadivel Balaji, 45, Indian actor (Yaaruda Mahesh, Kolamavu Kokila) and television personality, complications from a stroke.
- Gerald Blidstein, 82, Israeli academic (Ben-Gurion University of the Negev, Israel Academy of Sciences and Humanities).
- Mark Bomani, 88, Tanzanian jurist, Attorney General (1965–1976).
- Terry Buckle, 80, Canadian Anglican prelate, Archbishop of Yukon (1995–2010), cancer.
- Caroline Chomienne, 62, French film director and producer.
- Piotr Eberhardt, 84, Polish geographer specialising in demography and geopolitics.
- Patti Flynn, 83, Welsh jazz singer, cancer.
- Frederick K. Goodwin, 84, American psychiatrist.
- Marilyn Kagan, 69, American psychotherapist and actress (Foxes).
- Simon Hugh Piper Maddrell, 82, British insect physiologist.
- Emma Morosini, 96, Italian Roman Catholic pilgrim.
- Pierre Nahon, 84, Algerian-born French art collector and gallery owner.
- William L. Ogg, 83, American politician.
- Melih Onuş, 39, Turkish mathematician, COVID-19.
- Florence Pendleton, 94, American politician, U.S. shadow senator (1991–2007).
- Pamela L. Reeves, 66, American jurist, Judge (since 2014) and Chief Judge (since 2019) of the U.S. District Court for Eastern Tennessee, cancer.
- Franco Maria Ricci, 82, Italian art publisher and magazine editor, heart attack.
- Dame Diana Rigg, 82, English actress (The Avengers, On Her Majesty's Secret Service, Game of Thrones), Tony winner (1994), cancer.
- Barry Scott, 65, American actor (Ernest Goes to Jail, The Expert) and voice-over artist (Impact Wrestling).
- Srećko Štiglić, 77, Croatian Olympic athlete (1972).
- Leen van der Waal, 91, Dutch engineer and politician, MEP (1984–1997).
- Barbara Ker Wilson, 90, English-born Australian novelist.
- Narong Wongwan, 94, Thai industrialist and politician, Deputy Prime Minister (1992), Leader of the Opposition (1988–1990) and Minister of Agriculture and Cooperatives (1983–1986).
- Witold Zapała, 85, Polish dancer and choreographer.

=== 11 ===
- Agnivesh, 80, Indian politician and social activist, Haryana MLA (1977–1979) and founder of the Bandhua Mukti Morcha, multiple organ failure.
- Sonny Allen, 84, American basketball coach (Old Dominion Monarchs, Nevada Wolf Pack, Sacramento Monarchs), Parkinson's disease.
- Marilee Shapiro Asher, 107, American sculptor and author.
- Max Brannon, 86, American politician.
- Stéphane Caillat, 92, French conductor and composer.
- Roger Carel, 93, French actor (Meeting in Paris, Le Plumard en folie, The Umbrella Coup).
- Anthony Cekada, 69, American Catholic priest and Sedevacantist, stroke.
- John W. Costello, 93, American politician.
- Martin J. Dunn, 64, American politician, member of the Massachusetts Senate (1991–1993).
- László Gálos, 87, Hungarian Olympic volleyball player (1964).
- Bill Heller, 85, American politician, member of the Florida House of Representatives (2007–2011).
- Toots Hibbert, 77, Jamaican singer (Toots and the Maytals) and songwriter ("54-46 That's My Number", "Pressure Drop"), COVID-19.
- Olaf Holmstrup, 89, Danish Olympic cyclist (1952).
- Anthony Holten, 75, Irish author and historian.
- Annette Jahns, 62, German opera singer and director (Semperoper).
- Reggie Johnson, 79, American jazz double-bassist.
- Henryk Łapiński, 87, Polish actor (How I Unleashed World War II, Man of Marble, A Short Film About Killing).
- Grant Larson, 87, American politician, member of the Wyoming Senate (1995–2011).
- Christian Manen, 86, French composer.
- H. Jay Melosh, 73, American geophysicist.
- Tony Opatha, 73, Sri Lankan cricketer (national team).
- Peter Paret, 96, German-born American historian.
- Angelo Pereni, 76, Italian football player and manager.
- Christian Poncelet, 92, French politician, Deputy (1962–1972), member (1977–2008) and President of the Senate (1998–2008).
- Malcolm Scott, 84, English cricketer.
- Nadhim Shaker, 61, Iraqi football player (Al-Tayaran, national team) and manager (Erbil), COVID-19.
- Keith Short, 79, English sculptor and visual effects technician (Batman, Raiders of the Lost Ark, The Dark Crystal), stroke.
- Lois Stratton, 93, American politician, member of the Washington House of Representatives (1980–1985) and Senate (1985–1993).
- Richard William Timm, 97, American Roman Catholic priest, missionary and educator, co-founder of Notre Dame College, Dhaka.
- Nicholas Zagone, 89, American politician.
- Hans Zoller, 98, Swiss Olympic bobsledder.

=== 12 ===
- Navid Afkari, 27, Iranian wrestler, protester (2018 Iranian protests), and convicted murderer, execution by hanging.
- Jean-Claude Annaert, 85, French racing cyclist.
- Billy Autrey, 87, American football player (Chicago Bears).
- Joaquín Carbonell, 73, Spanish singer-songwriter, journalist and poet, COVID-19.
- Carlos Casamiquela, 72, Argentine agricultural engineer and public official, Minister of Agriculture (2013–2015) and President of INTA (2009–2013), COVID-19.
- Aline Chrétien, 84, Canadian socialite, Spouse of the Prime Minister (1993–2003).
- Jean Cluzel, 96, French politician, Senator (1971–1998).
- Alberto Collino, 73, Italian mathematician.
- Sir Terence Conran, 88, English designer (Habitat) and restaurateur (D&D London).
- Bob Crowell, 74, American politician, mayor of Carson City, Nevada (since 2009).
- John Fahey, 75, Australian politician, Premier of New South Wales (1992–1995), Minister for Finance (1996–2001), and President of WADA (2008–2013), leukaemia.
- Tracy Grose, 43, American soccer player and coach.
- Florence Howe, 91, American feminist author, complications from Parkinson's disease.
- Barbara Jefford, 90, British actress (Ulysses, Philomena, The Ninth Gate).
- Dominique Kalifa, 63, French historian, suicide.
- Didier Lapeyronnie, 64, French sociologist.
- Mohammed Makhlouf, 87, Syrian businessman, COVID-19.
- Azmi Mohamed Megahed, 70, Egyptian Olympic volleyball player (1976), COVID-19.
- Jack Roland Murphy, 83, American jewel thief and murderer, heart and organ failure.
- Mark Newman, 71, American baseball coach (Old Dominion Monarchs) and executive (New York Yankees).
- Linus Okok Okwach, 67, Kenyan Roman Catholic prelate, Bishop of Homa Bay (1993–2002), complications from a fall.
- Hugh Routley, 80, Australian footballer (Geelong).
- Yousef Saanei, 82, Iranian Twelver Shi'a cleric and politician, member of the Guardian Council (1980–1983), Prosecutor-General (1981–1989), kidney failure.
- Katip Şadi, 88, Turkish kemenche player.
- Donald Steinbeisser, 85, American politician.
- Sudhangan, 63, Indian journalist (Kumudam, Vikatan, Dinamani).
- Edna Wright, 76, American R&B singer (Honey Cone).

=== 13 ===
- Ayo Akinwale, 74, Nigerian actor (The Bridge, Sango).
- Sabit Brokaj, 78, Albanian physician and politician, Minister of Health (1991) and Defence (1997–1998), heart attack.
- Lillian Brown, 106, American media producer and makeup artist (Dwight D. Eisenhower, Bill Clinton, Martin Luther King Jr.).
- Mario Cafiero, 64, Argentine politician, Deputy (1997–2005), cancer.
- Ajit Das, 71, Indian actor (Sindura Bindu, Mu Sapanara Soudagar, Luchakali), COVID-19.
- Bernard Debré, 75, French politician, Deputy (2012–2017) and Councillor of Paris (since 2008).
- Graham Dunscombe, 96, Australian footballer.
- Kirsty Durward, 61, New Zealand gymnast.
- John Ferris, 71, American swimmer, Olympic bronze medalist (1968), lung cancer.
- Jean Garrabé, 89, French psychiatrist.
- Raymond Grew, 89, American social historian.
- David Halligan, 61, New Zealand rugby union player (Otago, Auckland).
- Lars Idermark, 63, Swedish businessman (PostNord, Swedbank, Kooperativa Förbundet).
- Egon Jensen, 82, Danish footballer (Esbjerg, national team).
- Bill Johnson, 84, American football player (Tennessee Volunteers).
- György Keleti, 74, Hungarian military officer and politician, Minister of Defence (1994–1998) and MP (1992–2010).
- Said Ali Kemal, 81–82, Comorian politician, Member of the Assembly of the Union of the Comoros (2004–2010).
- Paolo Knill, 88, Swiss scientist.
- Joe Lawson, 86, Australian footballer (Swan Districts).
- André Lespagnol, 77, French politician, President of the Regional Council of Brittany (2004–2010).
- Bruno Madaule, 49, French comic book author.
- Russ Meekins Jr., 71, American politician, member of the Alaska House of Representatives (1973–1975, 1977–1983).
- Zameer Akhtar Naqvi, 76, Indian-born Pakistani Islamic scholar, heart attack.
- Parrerito, 67, Brazilian singer, COVID-19.
- Don Piccard, 94, Swiss-born American balloonist.
- Günter Siegmund, 83, German heavyweight boxer, Olympic bronze medalist (1960).
- Raghuvansh Prasad Singh, 74, Indian politician, Minister of Rural Development (2004–2009) and MP (1996–2014), complications from COVID-19.
- Alan Smurfit, 77, Irish poker player.
- K. Thangavel, 68, Indian politician, Tamil Nadu MLA (2011–2016), COVID-19.
- Catherine Wilfert, 84, American pediatrician.

=== 14 ===
- Sei Ashina, 36, Japanese actress (Kamen Rider Hibiki, Silk, Kamui Gaiden), suicide.
- Sadek Bachchu, 66, Bangladeshi actor (Super Hero, Nissash Amar Tumi), COVID-19.
- Cynthia Barker, 58, Filipino-born British politician, Mayor of Hertsmere (since 2015).
- Robert Chabbal, 93, French physician, Director General of the French National Centre for Scientific Research (1976–1979).
- Petko Christov, 69, Bulgarian Roman Catholic prelate, Bishop of Nicopolis (since 1994).
- François Debré, 78, French writer and journalist.
- Council Julian Dunbar Jr., 98, American politician, member of the South Carolina House of Representatives (1971–1972).
- Jeff Dunne, 64, Australian footballer (St Kilda), heart attack.
- Enrique Ramón Fajarnés, 91, Spanish lawyer and politician, Mayor of Ibiza (1971–1974), Senator (1982–1986) and Deputy (1986–1993).
- Fer, 71, Spanish comics artist.
- Ralph Gants, 65, American jurist, Associate Justice (2009–2014) and Chief Justice (since 2014) of the Massachusetts Supreme Judicial Court, heart attack.
- Bill Gates Sr., 94, American attorney and philanthropist, complications from Alzheimer's disease.
- Ann Getty, 79, American philanthropist, heart attack.
- Bruce Goodwin, 71, American politician, member of the Ohio House of Representatives (2007–2012), multiple myeloma.
- André Guesdon, 71, French football player (Monaco, Nice) and manager (Angers).
- Al Kasha, 83, American songwriter ("Operation Heartbreak", "The Morning After", "We May Never Love Like This Again"), Oscar winner (1973, 1975).
- Alicia Maguiña, 81, Peruvian singer and composer.
- Oh In-hye, 36, South Korean actress, suicide.
- Benedicta de Oliveira, 92, Brazilian Olympic sprinter (1948).
- Florent Pereira, 67, Indian actor (Kayal, Nagesh Thiraiyarangam, Utraan), COVID-19.
- Sarah Poyntz, 93, Irish journalist and author, cancer.
- Dennis Sommers, 80, American baseball player (Cleveland Indians, San Diego Padres, New York Mets).
- Daniel Soulage, 78, French politician, Deputy (1993–1997) and Senator (2001–2011).
- Andrzej Stalmach, 78, Polish Olympic long jumper (1964, 1968).
- Peter Starkie, 72, Australian rock guitarist (Skyhooks, Jo Jo Zep & The Falcons), fall.
- Anne Stevenson, 87, American-British poet, heart failure.
- Roy Williams, 93, Canadian Olympic basketball player.
- Mack Yoho, 84, American football player (Buffalo Bills, Ottawa Rough Riders).

=== 15 ===
- Vital Alsar, 87, Spanish sailor and scientist.
- Faith Alupo, 36, Ugandan politician, MP (since 2018), COVID-19.
- Russell A. Anderson, 78, American jurist, Associate Justice (1998–2006) and Chief Justice (2006–2008) of the Minnesota Supreme Court.
- Aloysio de Andrade Faria, 99, Brazilian banker, founder of Banco Real.
- Edward D. Baca, 82, American lieutenant general, leukemia.
- Stephen B. Baxter, 91, American historian.
- Ed Bearss, 97, American military historian and author.
- Steve Carter, 90, American playwright (Eden, Nevis Mountain Dew, Dame Lorraine).
- Neal Creighton Sr., 90, American major general.
- Nicolò D'Amico, 67, Italian astrophysicist.
- Davis A. Donnelly, 93, American politician.
- Fatima Gallaire, 76, Algerian playwright.
- Johnny Gayle, 96, Jamaican cricket umpire.
- Sheldon Gomes, 69, Trinidadian cricketer (North Trinidad, East Trinidad, national team).
- James "T" Jones, 89, American football player (Texas Longhorns) and athletic director (Texas Tech Red Raiders).
- Suna Kıraç, 79, Turkish-American businesswoman, complications from amyotrophic lateral sclerosis.
- Danilo Kocevski, 73, Macedonian literary critic and novelist.
- Momčilo Krajišnik, 75, Bosnian politician and convicted war criminal, Member of the Presidency (1996–1998) and Speaker of the NSRS (1991–1996), COVID-19.
- Jan Krenz, 94, Polish composer and conductor.
- Paul Méfano, 83, Iraqi-born French composer and conductor.
- Denise Murray, 56, Canadian country singer.
- Sadashiv Patil, 86, Indian cricketer (Maharashtra, national team).
- Playalitical, 38, American rapper.
- Bill Power, 82, Australian footballer.
- Nahau Rooney, 75, Papua New Guinean politician, stroke.
- Nikolay Shmatko, 77, Ukrainian sculptor and painter.
- Yasin Mazhar Siddiqui, 75, Indian Islamic scholar.
- Pat Smullen, 43, Irish jockey, pancreatic cancer.
- Bobby Susser, 78, American songwriter.
- Péter Tereánszki-Tóth, 39, Hungarian footballer (Videoton).
- Mario Torelli, 83, Italian archaeologist.
- Moussa Traoré, 83, Malian military officer and politician, President (1968–1991).
- Floyd Vrtiska, 93, American politician, member of the Nebraska Legislature (1993–2005).
- Wang Zhiliang, 79, Chinese table tennis player, world champion (1963), stroke.
- Alan Wolstencroft, 83, English Anglican priest.
- Brien S. Wygle, 96, American aviator and test pilot (Boeing).

=== 16 ===
- B. Babusivan, 54, Indian film director (Vettaikaaran) and screenwriter (Kuruvi, Bairavaa), liver failure.
- Ahmed Ben Salah, 94, Tunisian politician, Minister of Finance (1961–1969).
- Chea Cheapoo, 77, Liberian politician and judge, chief justice (1987).
- Edward M. Coffman, 91, American military historian.
- Stanley Crouch, 74, American music critic, novelist, and poet.
- William Henry Danforth, 94, American physician and academic administrator, chancellor of Washington University in St. Louis (1971–1995).
- Margaret Donaldson, 94, Scottish development psychologist.
- Núria Gispert i Feliu, 84, Spanish politician, Catholic activist and social worker, City Councillor of Barcelona (1979–1995), colon cancer.
- Alien Huang, 36, Taiwanese singer, actor (Already Famous, Din Tao: Leader of the Parade) and television presenter (100% Entertainment), aortic dissection.
- Enrique Irazoqui, 76, Spanish actor (The Gospel According to St. Matthew).
- Jack Kelley, 93, American ice hockey coach (New England Whalers) and team executive (Pittsburgh Penguins).
- Anna Kędzierska, 88, Polish politician, economist and party activist, Minister of Internal Trade and Service (1984–1985).
- P. R. Krishna Kumar, 68, Indian ayurvedic physician, founder of the AVP Research Foundation, COVID-19.
- Apolonio Lombardo, 86, Panamanian footballer (national team).
- Maxim Martsinkevich, 36, Russian political activist, leader of Format18 and founder of Occupy Pedophilia.
- Kay McIff, 80, American politician.
- Nick Mourouzis, 83, American football player (Miami RedHawks) and coach (DePauw Tigers), complications from COVID-19.
- Mary Nash, 96, American author (Mrs. Coverlet).
- Balli Durga Prasad Rao, 64, Indian politician, MP (since 2019) and Andhra Pradesh MLA (1985–1989, 1994–1999, 2009–2014), COVID-19.
- David P. Rawson, 79, American diplomat, ambassador to Rwanda (1993–1996) and Mali (1996–1999).
- Roy C, 81, American southern soul singer-songwriter ("Impeach the President").
- Saefullah, 56, Indonesian politician, Mayor of Central Jakarta (2010–2014) and Regional Secretary of Jakarta (since 2014), COVID-19-induced septic shock and ARDS.
- Elsa Serrano, 79, Italian-born Argentinian fashion designer, asphyxiation due to fire.
- Doak Snead, 70, American singer-songwriter.
- Francisco Trois, 74, Brazilian chess player, diabetes.
- Kapila Vatsyayan, 91, Indian classical scholar, MP (2006–2012).
- James T. Willerson, 80, American cardiologist.

=== 17 ===
- Hassan Achour, 82, Algerian football player (CR Belouizdad, national team) and manager (Chéraga).
- Jimoh Aliu, 80, Nigerian actor.
- Roger Armour, 87, British vascular surgeon.
- Daniel Charles-Alfred, 86, French footballer (Nîmes Olympique, Montpellier).
- Ricardo Ciciliano, 43, Colombian footballer (Deportes Tolima, Millonarios, Juan Aurich), pneumonia.
- Irma Dryden, 100, American nurse (Tuskegee Airmen).
- Donald Keith Duncan, 80, Jamaican politician, MP (1976–1983, 2007–2016), COVID-19.
- Birger Folke, 84, Swedish tennis player and television commentator.
- Ashok Gasti, 55, Indian politician, MP (since 2020), COVID-19.
- Barry Griffiths, 81, English violinist.
- Terry Goodkind, 72, American author (The Sword of Truth, The Law of Nines).
- Robert W. Gore, 83, American engineer, philanthropist and inventor.
- Winston Groom, 77, American novelist (Forrest Gump), heart attack.
- Reg Harrison, 97, English football player (Derby County, Boston United) and manager (Long Eaton United).
- Harvey Hodder, 77, Canadian politician, Newfoundland and Labrador MHA (1993–2007), cancer.
- Miao Chunting, 101, Chinese politician, Guizhou CPPCC Committee Chairman (1959–1967, 1980–1993).
- Luboš Perek, 101, Czech astronomer.
- Joe Ruklick, 82, American basketball player (Philadelphia Warriors).
- Alwi Shahab, 84, Indonesian journalist (Republika), pneumonia.
- Pir Hameeduddin Sialvi, 84, Pakistani politician, Senator (1988–1994).
- Dick Taylor, 89, American politician.
- László Török, 79, Hungarian historian and archaeologist.
- Liladhar Vaghela, 85, Indian politician, MP (2014–2019) and Gujarat MLA (1975–1980, 1985–1995, 1998–2002, 2007–2014), respiratory failure.
- Larry Wilson, 82, American Hall of Fame football player (St. Louis Cardinals), coach and executive.

=== 18 ===
- Mohamad Atwi, 32, Lebanese footballer (Ansar, Akhaa Ahli Aley, national team), complications from gunshot wounds.
- Asit Bandopadhyay, 84, Indian dramatist, screenwriter and actor (Mahaprithibi), COVID-19.
- Talat Basari, 97, Iranian Baháʼí poet, feminist, academic, and writer.
- Stephen F. Cohen, 81, American academic and historian, lung cancer.
- Georgia Dobbins, 78, American singer.
- Don Feeley, 82, American college basketball coach (Sacred Heart, Fairleigh Dickinson).
- Ruth Bader Ginsburg, 87, American jurist, Associate Justice of the U.S. Supreme Court (since 1993) and Judge of the D.C. Cir. (1980–1993), complications from pancreatic cancer.
- Enzo Golino, 88, Italian journalist and writer.
- A. Kalanithi, Indian politician, MP (1980–1988), cardiac arrest.
- Joachim Kunert, 90, German film director and screenwriter.
- Sam McBratney, 77, Northern Irish author (Guess How Much I Love You).
- Xenofon Moudatsios, 60, Greek Olympic water polo player.
- Anacleto de Oliveira, 74, Portuguese Roman Catholic prelate, Bishop of Viana do Castelo (since 2010), traffic collision.
- Awang anak Raweng, 91, Malaysian military officer.
- Amélie Rorty, 88, Belgian-born American philosopher.
- Daphne Seeney, 87, Australian tennis player.
- Shah Ahmad Shafi, 90, Bangladeshi Islamic scholar, Rector of the Hathazari Madrassah (1986–2020) and Chairman of the Befaqul Madarisil Arabia Bangladesh.
- Mike Tilleman, 76, American football player (New Orleans Saints, Atlanta Falcons, Houston Oilers).
- Marcel Trillat, 80, French journalist and filmmaker.

=== 19 ===
- David Cook, 76, Northern Irish politician, MPA (1982–1986) and Lord Mayor of Belfast (1978–1979), COVID-19.
- Roza Vidyadhar Deshpande, 91, Indian politician, MP (1971–1977).
- J. Delano Ellis, 75, American Pentecostal clergyman.
- Károly Fatér, 80, Hungarian footballer, Olympic champion (1968).
- Yutakayama Hiromitsu, 72, Japanese sumo wrestler.
- Gary Hughes, 79, American baseball executive (Chicago Cubs, Florida Marlins, New York Yankees), cancer.
- Donald M. Kendall, 99, American food and beverage executive and political advisor, CEO of PepsiCo (1971–1986).
- Lee Kerslake, 73, English drummer (Uriah Heep, Ozzy Osbourne, Toe Fat), prostate cancer.
- Al Langlois, 85, Canadian ice hockey player (Montreal Canadiens, New York Rangers, Detroit Red Wings), Stanley Cup champion (1958-1960).
- Richard Lewis, 76, British Anglican prelate, Bishop of St Edmundsbury and Ipswich (1997–2007).
- Dame Georgina Mace, 67, British ecologist and conservation scientist.
- Brett Madden, 41, American voice actress (Alan Wake), brain cancer.
- Ephrem M'Bom, 66, Cameroonian footballer (Canon Yaoundé, national team).
- Darvin Moon, 56, American poker player, complications from surgery.
- Dick Nemelka, 76, American basketball player (BYU Cougars, Utah Stars), cancer.
- Mary O'Malley, 79, English playwright (Once a Catholic).
- Andrzej Pityński, 73, Polish-American monumental sculptor (Katyń Memorial, The Partisans).
- Jean-Pierre Pophillat, 83, French painter and lithographer.
- Paitoon Pumrat, 54, Thai actor and comedian.
- Janez Puterle, 70, Slovenian ice hockey player.
- Charles E. Schaefer, 86, American psychologist.
- Tara Singh, 82, Indian politician, Maharashtra MLA (1999–2019).
- John Turner, 91, Canadian politician, Prime Minister (1984), Minister of Justice (1968–1972) and Finance (1972–1975), and MP (1962–1976, 1984–1993).

=== 20 ===
- Uktam Barnoev, 56, Uzbek politician and agricultural engineer, Deputy Prime Minister (2020), COVID-19.
- Meron Benvenisti, 86, Israeli political scientist, Deputy Mayor of Jerusalem (1971–1978).
- Ken Blaiklock, 92, British Antarctic explorer.
- James A. Boucher, 83, American politician.
- James Breeden, 85, American civil rights activist and Episcopal priest.
- Michael Chapman, 84, American cinematographer (Taxi Driver, Raging Bull, The Fugitive) and film director, heart failure.
- Robert Graetz, 92, American clergyman and civil rights activist (Montgomery bus boycott).
- Shehu Idris, 84, Nigerian aristocrat, Emir of Zazzau (since 1975).
- Sir Malcolm Innes of Edingight, 82, Scottish herald, Lord Lyon King of Arms of Scotland (1981–2001), cancer.
- Keith Jobling, 86, English football player (Grimsby Town) and manager (Boston United).
- Eliahu I. Jury, 97, Iraqi-born American engineer.
- Knut Kloster, 91, Norwegian shipping magnate, co-founder of Norwegian Cruise Line.
- Longcat, 18, Japanese domestic cat, internet meme.
- Blanche M. Manning, 85, American jurist, Judge of the U.S. District Court for Northern Illinois (since 1994).
- Caroline Mortimer, 78, British actress (The Death of Adolf Hitler, The Pallisers), leukaemia.
- Dan Olweus, 89, Swedish-Norwegian psychologist.
- Rosa María Ortiz, 65, Peruvian lawyer and politician, Minister of Energy and Mines (2015–2016).
- Walter Owens, 87, American baseball player.
- Marian Packham, 92, Canadian biochemist.
- Garland F. Pinholster, 92, American college basketball coach (Oglethorpe) and politician, member of the Georgia House of Representatives (1991–2003).
- Mary Pruitt, 86, American politician, member of the Tennessee House of Representatives (1985–2013), blood clot as a result of a fall.
- Archie Romines, 91, American politician.
- Rossana Rossanda, 96, Italian politician and journalist, Deputy (1963–1968) and co-founder of Il manifesto.
- Moshe Sharoni, 91, Israeli politician, member of the Knesset (2006–2009).
- Alan Tomkins, 81, British art director (The Empire Strikes Back, Saving Private Ryan, Batman Begins).
- Richard Turner-Warwick, 95, British urologist.
- Gerardo Vera, 73, Spanish costume designer (El Amor brujo), film director (La Celestina, Second Skin) and actor, COVID-19.
- Margaret Sellers Walker, 84, American civil servant.

=== 21 ===
- Jaime Alves, 55, Portuguese footballer (Boavista, Vitória de Guimarães, national team).
- Arthur Ashkin, 98, American scientist, Nobel Prize laureate (2018).
- Hamdi Benani, 77, Algerian musician and singer, COVID-19.
- Virginio Bettini, 78, Italian politician, MEP (1989–1994).
- Varujan Boghosian, 94, American artist, complications from a hip fracture.
- Giuseppe Caldarola, 74, Italian journalist and politician, Deputy (2001–2008).
- Julián Cardona, 59–60, Mexican photojournalist.
- Ron Cobb, 83, American-Australian editorial cartoonist and prop and set designer (Star Wars, Back to the Future, Conan the Barbarian), Lewy body dementia.
- Tommy DeVito, 92, American Hall of Fame musician and singer (The Four Seasons), COVID-19.
- Roy Head, 79, American singer ("Treat Her Right"), heart attack.
- Lars-Åke Lagrell, 80, Swedish sports personality, Governor of Kronoberg County (2002–2006).
- Amos Lin, 87, Israeli Olympic basketball player (1952).
- Michael Lonsdale, 89, British-French actor (The Day of the Jackal, Moonraker, The Remains of the Day).
- Gilbert Meyer, 78, French politician, Deputy (1993–2007) and mayor of Colmar (1995–2020).
- Claude Moisy, 93, French journalist and writer, President of the Agence France-Presse (1990–1993).
- Jacques-Louis Monod, 93, French composer and pianist.
- Roger R. Moore, 98, American politician.
- John Meirion Morris, 84, Welsh sculptor.
- Harold Moss, 90, American politician, mayor of Tacoma, Washington (1994–1996).
- Bob Nevin, 82, Canadian ice hockey player (Toronto Maple Leafs, New York Rangers, Edmonton Oilers), Stanley Cup champion (1962, 1963).
- Phil O'Keefe, 71, British geographer, cancer.
- Bernt Persson, 74, Swedish speedway rider.
- Brian Peterson, 83, South African footballer (Blackpool, Durban United, Durban City).
- Bryndís Pétursdóttir, 92, Icelandic actress.
- Mykola Polyakov, 74, Ukrainian scientist, rector of Oles Honchar Dnipro National University (since 1998).
- Rip Ryman, 86, American politician.
- K. V. Shanthi, 83, Indian actress (Chori Chori, Madhuvidhu, Devi Kanyakumari).
- Shyama Sharma, 70, Indian politician, Himachal Pradesh MLA, COVID-19.
- Ang Rita Sherpa, 72, Nepalese mountaineer, complications from a stroke.
- Bob Smith, 89, American politician, member of the U.S. House of Representatives (1983–1995, 1997–1999).
- Jackie Stallone, 98, American astrologer.
- Ira Sullivan, 89, American jazz trumpeter, metastatic pancreatic cancer.
- Richard Trim, 88, British radar engineer.
- Wan Mokhtar Ahmad, 88, Malaysian politician, Menteri Besar of Terengganu (1974–1999) and Terengganu State MLA (1974–1999), heart disease.
- Sune Wehlin, 97, Swedish Olympic modern pentathlete (1948).
- Martin Williams, 72, Welsh chemist and environmentalist.
- Bobby Wilson, 84, English tennis player.

=== 22 ===
- Bob Atkins, 74, American football player (Houston Oilers, St. Louis Cardinals).
- Neil Brannon, 79, American politician, member of the Oklahoma House of Representatives (2002–2010).
- Malcolm Carson, 60, American football player (Minnesota Vikings).
- Rajendra Devlekar, 54, Indian politician, mayor of Kalyan-Dombivli (2015–2018), COVID-19.
- Mary Gergen, 81, American social psychologist.
- Michael Gwisdek, 78, German actor and film director (Treffen in Travers, The Big Mambo).
- Bob Ingham, 88, Australian poultry magnate (Inghams Enterprises), philanthropist and racehorse breeder.
- Jon Hui-jong, 90, North Korean politician and diplomat, member of the Central Committee of the WPK (1980–2016), SPA (1982–1998).
- Sergey Khoruzhiy, 78, Russian theoretical physicist, philosopher and translator (Ulysses).
- Frie Leysen, 70, Belgian festival director.
- Li Dongying, 99, Chinese metallurgist.
- Archie Lyndhurst, 19, English actor (So Awkward), brain hemorrhage caused by acute lymphoblastic leukemia.
- Ashutosh Mohunta, 67, Indian jurist, Acting Chief Justice of the Punjab and Haryana High Court (2014) and member of the PSHRC (since 2016), COVID-19.
- Jacques Senard, 100, French diplomat.
- Gopal Singh Rawat, Indian politician, Uttarakhand MLA (2012–2017), COVID-19.
- Dudley Riggs, 88, American improvisational comedian.
- Road Warrior Animal, 60, American Hall of Fame professional wrestler (NWA, WWF, AJPW), heart attack.
- Adamu Daramani Sakande, 58, Ghanaian politician, MP (2009–2013).
- Agne Simonsson, 84, Swedish football player (Örgryte, national team) and manager (Iraklis), pneumonia.
- Mark Snyder, 74, American politician.
- Soraya Santiago Solla, 72, Puerto Rican transgender pioneer.
- Andre Vltchek, 57, Russian-born American political analyst, journalist and filmmaker, complications from diabetes.
- Ashalata Wabgaonkar, 79, Indian actress (Ankush, Ahista Ahista, Yaadon Ki Kasam), COVID-19.

=== 23 ===
- Vakha Agaev, 67, Russian politician, Deputy (since 2011), COVID-19.
- Yvette Alloo, 90, Belgian table tennis player, Paralympic gold medalist (1960, 1964).
- Suresh Angadi, 65, Indian politician, Minister of State for Railways (since 2019) and MP (since 2004), COVID-19.
- Ray Batten, 75, English rugby league player (Leeds Rhinos, national team) and coach (Wakefield Trinity).
- Charles Stuart Bowyer, 86, American astronomer, complications from COVID-19.
- Eric Bransby, 103, American artist.
- David K. Cohen, 86, American educational researcher.
- François Diederich, 68, Luxembourgish chemist, cancer.
- Arthur A. Dugoni, 95, American dentist.
- Sir Harold Evans, 92, British-American journalist (The Sunday Times, The Week, The Guardian), and author, heart failure.
- Renée Fox, 92, American sociologist, leukemia.
- Toomas Frey, 82, Estonian ecologist, geobotanist and forest scientist.
- John Gray, 83, Canadian journalist and author, complications from Parkinson's disease.
- Juliette Gréco, 93, French actress (The Sun Also Rises, Belphegor, or Phantom of the Louvre, The Night of the Generals) and singer.
- Guitar Crusher, 89, American blues singer and guitarist.
- W. S. Holland, 85, American drummer (The Tennessee Three).
- Dave Nutting, 89, American industrial designer and engineer.
- Zlatko Portner, 58, Serbian handball player, Olympic bronze medalist (1988).
- Krishna Chandra Punetha, Indian politician, Uttarakhand MLA.
- Brenda Robertson, 91, Canadian politician, Senator (1984–2004) and New Brunswick MLA (1967–1984).
- Erich Romauch, 81, Austrian Olympic ice hockey player (1964).
- Gale Sayers, 77, American Hall of Fame football player (Chicago Bears) and administrator (Southern Illinois), characterized in Brian's Song, complications from dementia.
- James E. Smith, 89, American politician.
- Steve Smith, 68, American Olympic pole vaulter (1972).
- Laurie Smith Camp, 66, American jurist, Judge (since 2001) and Chief Judge (2011–2018) of the U.S. District Court for Nebraska.
- Leo Sugar, 91, American football player (Chicago/St. Louis Cardinals, Philadelphia Eagles, Detroit Lions).
- Eddie Thomas, 87, English footballer (Southampton, Salisbury City).
- Pierre Troisgros, 92, French restaurateur.
- G. P. Venkidu, 85, Indian politician, Tamil Nadu MLA (1996–2001), COVID-19.
- Iván Verebély, 82, Hungarian actor (The Boy in the Striped Pyjamas).

=== 24 ===
- Sekhar Basu, 68, Indian nuclear scientist, Chairman of the Atomic Energy Commission (2015–2018) and director of BARC (2012–2016), COVID-19.
- Robert Bechtle, 88, American painter, Lewy body dementia.
- Jaime Blanco García, 76, Spanish politician, President of Cantabria (1990–1991).
- Colette Giudicelli, 76, French politician, Senator (since 2008).
- Arnold Goldberg, 91, American psychiatrist and psychoanalyst.
- Capistrano Francisco Heim, 86, American-born Brazilian Roman Catholic prelate, Territorial Prelate of Itaituba (1988–2010).
- Paul Hernandez, 74, American civil rights activist.
- Keith Hufnagel, 46, American skateboarder, brain cancer.
- Dean Jones, 59, Australian cricket player (Victoria, Derbyshire, national team) and commentator, stroke.
- John Walter Jones, 74, Welsh civil servant, Chief Executive of the Welsh Language Board (1993–2004).
- William E. McEuen, 79, American record producer (Steve Martin, Nitty Gritty Dirt Band and film producer (The Jerk)).
- Max Merritt, 79, New Zealand musician ("Slipping Away"), Goodpasture syndrome.
- Derland Moore, 68, American football player (New Orleans Saints, New York Jets).
- John J. Myers, 79, American Roman Catholic prelate, Bishop of Peoria (1990–2001), Ecclesiastical Superior of Turks and Caicos (2001–2016) and Archbishop of Newark (2001–2016).
- Kevin O'Brien, 88, Australian footballer (Carlton).
- Paul Pettit, 88, American baseball player (Pittsburgh Pirates).
- Robert Poydasheff, 90, American politician, Mayor of Columbus, Georgia (2003–2007).
- B. Narayan Rao, 65, Indian politician, Karnataka MLA (since 2018), COVID-19.
- Bertram Richardson, 88, English cricketer (Derbyshire).
- Corine Rottschäfer, 82, Dutch model and beauty pageant winner (Miss World 1959).
- Christopher Vialva, 40, American convicted murderer, execution by lethal injection.
- Gerhard Weber, 79, German fashion designer and retail executive (Gerry Weber).
- Zhang Xinshi, 86, Chinese plant ecologist.

=== 25 ===
- Ronnie Bacon, 85, English footballer (Gillingham, Norwich City).
- S. P. Balasubrahmanyam, 74, Indian playback singer ("Didi Tera Devar Deewana") and actor (Maya, Mayabazar), complications from COVID-19.
- James P. Carse, 87, American academic, heart failure.
- Ed Cummings, 79, American football player (New York Jets, Denver Broncos).
- Frans Derks, 89, Dutch football referee and executive (Dordrecht).
- Peter Hampton, 66, English footballer (Leeds United, Stoke City, Burnley).
- Christine Hunt, 70, Australian Olympic javelin thrower (1976).
- Johann Löser, 83, Austrian football player (Austria Wien) and manager (SV Stockerau).
- Bernard Madrelle, 76, French politician, Deputy (1978–2007), mayor of Saint-Seurin-de-Cursac (1983–1989) and Blaye (1989–2008), liver cancer.
- Keith McGuinness, 87, Australian footballer (South Melbourne).
- Jerry Oliver, 89, American basketball coach (Indiana Hoosiers, Indiana Pacers).
- Viktor Panin, 89, Russian physicist.
- Goran Paskaljević, 73, Serbian film director (The Dog Who Loved Trains, Special Treatment, How Harry Became a Tree).
- Matt Ratana, 54, New Zealand-born British police officer, shot.
- Conrad Roland, 86, German architect.
- George Sayliss, 89, Canadian ice hockey player (East York Lyndhursts).
- Simos Simopoulos, Greek politician, Minister of Infrastructure and Transport (2012) and Rector of National Technical University of Athens (2010–2014).
- Colin Tully, 75, Australian footballer (Collingwood).
- Jeanne Valérie, 79, French actress.

=== 26 ===
- Isher Judge Ahluwalia, 74, Indian economist, brain cancer.
- Feda Almaliti, 43, American autism advocate, house fire.
- José Antonio Arbesú, 80, Cuban diplomat, cancer.
- John D. Barrow, 67, English cosmologist, theoretical physicist and mathematician, colon cancer.
- Erik Bartnes, 80, Norwegian politician, county mayor of Nord-Trøndelag (2003–2007).
- Almontaser Bellah, 70, Egyptian actor.
- John Bernhagen, 86, American politician.
- Jacques Beurlet, 75, Belgian footballer (Standard Liège, national team).
- Dan W. Brock, 82, American philosopher.
- Greg Brown, 63, American football player (Philadelphia Eagles, Atlanta Falcons).
- Ernest Carl Castle, 93, American Navy captain.
- Mark Cousins, 72, British cultural critic and architectural theorist.
- Dai Yuanben, 92, Chinese physicist, member of the Chinese Academy of Sciences.
- Sir Geoffrey Dalton, 89, British vice admiral, Deputy Supreme Allied Commander Atlantic (1984–1987).
- Moshe Efrati, 86, Israeli choreographer.
- Norman Gorbaty, 87, American artist.
- Abdul Mahdi Hadi, 74, Iraqi footballer (Al-Mina'a, national team) and manager (Al-Mina'a), COVID-19.
- Jay Johnstone, 74, American baseball player (Los Angeles Dodgers, Chicago Cubs, New York Yankees) and commentator, World Series champion (1978, 1981), complications from COVID-19.
- Masayoshi Kabe, 70, Japanese bassist and guitarist (The Golden Cups, Speed, Glue & Shinki, Vodka Collins), multiple organ failure.
- John K. McNulty, 85, American legal scholar.
- Rebecca Morton, 56, American political scientist.
- Hal Raether, 87, American baseball player (Philadelphia/Kansas City Athletics).
- Nasser Sebaggala, 72, Ugandan politician, mayor of Kampala (1998–1999, 2006–2011), intussusception.
- Adele Stolte, 87, German soprano singer.
- Denis Tillinac, 73, French writer and journalist.
- Leo Traister, 101, American college football coach (Eureka College Red Devils).
- Suzanne Tremblay, 83, Canadian politician, MP (1993–2004), Opposition House Leader (1997), cancer.
- Szabolcs Udvari, 46, Hungarian footballer (Szeged LC, Békéscsaba 1912 Előre, Budapest Honvéd).
- Patricia Warner, 99, American spy.
- Nicolas Wildhaber, 90, Swiss Olympic swimmer and LEN official.
- Jimmy Winston, 75, English musician (Small Faces) and actor (Doctor Who).

=== 27 ===
- Mahbubey Alam, 71, Bangladeshi jurist, Attorney General (since 2009), COVID-19.
- Pete Ankney, 88, American football coach.
- Oleksandr Blizniuchenko, 69, Ukrainian Olympic sport shooter.
- Kevin Burns, 65, American film and television producer (Ancient Aliens, Lost in Space, Poseidon), cardiac arrest.
- Rose Mary Hatem Bonsack, 86, American politician, member of the Maryland House of Delegates (1991–1999).
- Kenneth E. Calvert, 91, American politician.
- Wolfgang Clement, 80, German politician, Minister for Economics and Labour (2002–2005) and Minister-President of North Rhine-Westphalia (1998–2002), lung cancer.
- Noriyuki Haraguchi, 74, Japanese artist, stomach cancer.
- David Hinchcliffe, 81, Australian footballer (Geelong).
- Kevin Lewis, 72, Australian cricketer (South Australia).
- Mario Luis Bautista Maulión, 85, Argentine Roman Catholic prelate, Archbishop of Paraná (2003–2010).
- Larry Nichols, 70, American political commentator (The Clinton Chronicles).
- Yuri Orlov, 96, Russian-born American nuclear physicist, political dissident and human rights activist, founder of the Moscow Helsinki Group.
- Barclay Palmer, 88, English Olympic shot putter (1956).
- Susan Ryan, 77, Australian politician and public servant, Senator (1975–1987), Minister for Education (1983–1987) and Age Discrimination Commissioner (2011–2016).
- Jaswant Singh, 82, Indian politician, Minister of Finance (1996, 2002–2004), Defence (2000–2001) and External Affairs (1998–2002), multiple organ failure.
- Yuko Takeuchi, 40, Japanese actress (Ring, Miss Sherlock, FlashForward), hanging.
- C. F. Thomas, 81, Indian politician, Kerala MLA (since 1980).
- Kōsei Tomita, 84, Japanese voice actor (Doraemon, Tensai Bakabon, Mazinger Z), stroke.
- Ivo Vykydal, 55, Czech politician, Deputy (2002–2006).
- John Waddy, 100, British Army officer, Colonel SAS (1964–1967).
- Tjalling Waterbolk, 96, Dutch archaeologist.

=== 28 ===
- Robert Adair, 96, American physicist.
- G. S. Amur, 95, Indian literary critic and writer.
- Rubén Anguiano, 64, Mexican footballer (Zacatepec, Atlante, national team), COVID-19.
- Doug Brinham, 86, Canadian Olympic basketball player (1956).
- Bruce Bronzan, 73, American politician, member of the California State Assembly (1982–1993).
- Dee Cannon, 58, British acting coach (Cynthia Erivo, Colin Firth, Tom Hiddleston), lymphoma.
- Lodwrick Cook, 92, American businessman and philanthropist.
- Tennyson Cooray, 68, Sri Lankan actor (Re Daniel Dawal Migel, Cheriyo, Somy Boys), cardiac arrest.
- Gene Corman, 93, American film producer and agent.
- Jackie Dennis, 77, Scottish singer.
- Frédéric Devreese, 91, Belgian composer (Benvenuta, The Cruel Embrace).
- Jacqueline Diffring, 100, German-British sculptor.
- Laurie Fagan, 79, Australian rugby league player (Balmain Tigers, Penrith Panthers).
- Ronald Forfar, 81, English actor (Bread).
- Juan Carlos Guerra Zunzunegui, 85, Spanish lawyer and politician, Senator (1977–1986) and Deputy (1986–2008).
- Josephine Harris, 89, British glass engraver and painter, complications from a fall.
- Peter Jutzeler, 80, Swiss Olympic wrestler (1964, 1968).
- Paul Moore, 61, British banker and whistleblower, colitis.
- Terry Mulvoy, 81, English footballer.
- Maynard Solomon, 90, American music producer and biographer.
- Anwara Taimur, 83, Indian politician, Chief Minister of Assam (1980–1981), MP (1988–1990, 2004–2010) and Assam MLA (1972–1985, 1991–1996).
- Joy A. Thomas, 57, Indian-born American information theorist.
- Hiroki Yuhara, 36, Japanese rugby union player (Toshiba Brave Lupus).

=== 29 ===
- Abd al-Rahman Abd al-Khaliq, 80, Egyptian-Kuwaiti Islamic scholar and preacher, heart attack.
- Luigi Arisio, 94, Italian politician and union worker, Deputy (1983–1987).
- Silva Batuta, 80, Brazilian footballer (Flamengo, Corinthians, national team).
- Aster Berkhof, 100, Belgian author.
- Tom Blake, 93, American football player (New York Bulldogs).
- Timothy Ray Brown, 54, American considered the first person cured of HIV/AIDS, leukemia.
- Justin Connolly, 87, British composer.
- Rebecca Cryer, 73, American attorney and tribal judge, COVID-19.
- János Dalmati, 78, Hungarian Olympic athlete (1972).
- Mac Davis, 78, American singer-songwriter ("Baby, Don't Get Hooked on Me", "It's Hard to Be Humble") and actor (North Dallas Forty), complications from heart surgery.
- Robert Eighteen-Bisang, 72–73, Canadian author and scholar of vampire literature.
- Mamu Ram Gonder, 70, Indian politician, Haryana MLA (2009–2014), post-COVID-19 complications.
- Rocco Prestia, 69, American bassist (Tower of Power).
- Phillip Rebbeck, 72, Australian cricketer (South Australia).
- Helen Reddy, 78, Australian-American singer ("I Am Woman", "Delta Dawn") and actress (Pete's Dragon), Grammy winner (1973).
- Doyle Royal, 101, American college soccer and tennis coach (Maryland).
- Sabah Al-Ahmad Al-Jaber Al-Sabah, 91, Kuwaiti royal, Emir (since 2006) and Prime Minister (2003–2006).
- Mirza Shahi, 88–89, Pakistani actor (Chakori), complications from COVID-19.
- KC Sivasankaran, 96, Indian artist.
- Jack Stephans, 81, American football coach, complications from amyotrophic lateral sclerosis.
- Carlisle Trost, 90, American Navy admiral, Chief of Naval Operations (1986–1990).
- Ania Walwicz, 68–69, Polish-born Australian poet, playwright and visual artist.
- John Whittaker, 70, New Zealand rugby league player (Warrington, Wellington, national team), cancer.
- Isidora Žebeljan, 53, Serbian composer and conductor.

=== 30 ===
- Roger Ballard, 77, British sociologist.
- Tom Bermingham, 80, Irish Gaelic footballer.
- Ali Bozer, 95, Turkish politician and academic, Acting Prime Minister (1989) and Minister of Foreign Affairs (1990), COVID-19.
- Jacques Brunhes, 85, French politician, Deputy (1978–2007).
- Simon Eine, 84, French actor (Another Man, Another Chance, Notre musique, Sarah's Key).
- Burnham Hodgson, 94, English archdeacon.
- Emyr Humphreys, 101, Welsh novelist (A Toy Epic) and poet.
- John Jenkins, 68, American politician, member of the Maine Senate (1996–1998), mayor of Lewiston (1994–1998) and Auburn, Maine (2007–2009).
- Pia Juul, 58, Danish poet.
- Homer Kent, 94, American theologian.
- Romain Bruno Légaré, 95, French missionary.
- Scott Lilienfeld, 59, American psychologist and author (50 Great Myths of Popular Psychology), pancreatic cancer.
- Mai Chia-je, 33, Taiwanese baseball player (Brother Elephants), traffic collision.
- Vittorio Mathieu, 96, Italian philosopher.
- Leonard Mastroni, 71, American politician, member of the Kansas House of Representatives (since 2017).
- Ken McKim, 95, Canadian football player (Toronto Argonauts, Saskatchewan Roughriders).
- Bob Miller, 64, American Olympic ice hockey player (Boston Bruins, Los Angeles Kings, national team).
- Guy Natusch, 99, New Zealand architect.
- Viktor Nikitin, 59, Russian writer, playwright and editor, complications from COVID-19.
- Ardeth Platte, 84, American Dominican nun and anti-war activist.
- Quino, 88, Argentine-Spanish cartoonist (Mafalda), stroke.
- Rinaldo Ruatti, 90, Italian Olympic bobsledder (1968), world champion (1962).
- Eli Ruckenstein, 95, Romanian-born American physical chemist.
- John Russell, 100, American Hall of Fame equestrian, Olympic bronze medalist (1952).
- Vasily Sorokin, 93, Russian Olympic sport shooter.
- Ananta Charan Sukla, 77, Indian literary scholar, multiple organ failure.
- Frank Windsor, 92, English actor (Z-Cars, Softly, Softly, EastEnders).
- Lamu, 30, Tibetan-Chinese Vlogger.
