= Lily Auchincloss =

American journalist and art collector

- Born: Lily van Ameringen; April 5, 1922; Newark, New Jersey, US
- Died: June 6, 1996 (aged 74); New York City, US
- Education: Radcliffe College
- Occupations: Journalist, philanthropist, art collector
- Spouse: Douglas Auchincloss (m. 1956; div. 1979)
- Children: 2

Lily Auchincloss (née van Ameringen, April 5, 1922 – June 6, 1996) was an American journalist, philanthropist, and art collector.

== Early life ==
Lily Auchincloss was born in 1922 in Newark, New Jersey. Her father, Arnold Louis van Ameringen (1891–1966), who was born in the Netherlands, was the founder and later chairman of International Flavors and Fragrances and her mother was philanthropist Hedwig Adele van Ameringen (née Pfaltz) (1901–1996). She had two siblings, Henry van Ameringen and Patricia Kind (née van Ameringen). She attended Radcliffe College and graduated cum laude in 1944.

== Career ==
While at Radcliffe, she met Philip Johnson and Marcel Breuer, who helped instill her interest in architecture and design. After graduation, she worked in New York City as a writer and editor. She worked at Look, World Telegram, New York Herald Tribune, Glamour, Harper's Bazaar and McCall's.

=== Philanthropy ===
She was a noted philanthropist. She supported institutions and organizations such as The Museum of Modern Art (MoMA), the Cathedral of St. John the Divine, and the American Academy in Rome. She became a trustee at The Museum of Modern Art in 1971 and served on numerous committees at the museum including painting, sculpture, drawings, prints, illustrated books, and architecture and design. She financed exhibitions about Frank Lloyd Wright, Rem Koolhaus, Cy Twombly and Louis I. Kahn. MoMA named the Lily Auchincloss Study Center for Architecture and Design after her in 1994.

The Lily Auchincloss Foundation, Inc., is a New York City non-profit grantmaking foundation.

== Personal life ==
In 1956, she married Douglas Auchincloss, a writer at Newsweek and later the religion editor of Time magazine. The couple divorced in 1979. Together, they had:

- Alexandra Auchincloss, who married Paul Karel Herzan in 1987.

In 1980, she was inducted into the International Best Dressed List.

Auchincloss died on June 6, 1996, of cancer in Manhattan.
