= Viktor Nikitin =

Viktor Nikitin may refer to:

- Viktor Nikitin (singer) (1911–1994), Soviet tenor
- Viktor Nikitin (pilot) (1893–1933), Russian and Serbian pilot
- Viktor Nikitin (writer) (1960–2020), Russian writer and editor
