= Wildhaber =

Wildhaber is a surname. Notable people with the surname include:

- Luzius Wildhaber (1937–2020), Swiss judge
- Marcel Wildhaber (born 1985), Swiss cyclo-cross cyclist
- Nicolas Wildhaber (1929–2020), Swiss swimmer
