= Lotte Strauss (disambiguation) =

Lotte Strauss may refer to:

- Lotte Strauss (pathologist) (April 15, 1913 – July 4, 1985), German-American pathologist
- Lotte Strauss (author) (August 2, 1913 – September 6, 2020), German-American author
