= Golino =

Golino may refer to:

== People ==
- Carlo Golino (1913–1991), Italian academic and educator
- Enzo Golino (1932−2020), Italian journalist and literary critic
- Valeria Golino (born 1965), Italian actress and director

== Other uses ==
- Golino, a settlement in Centovalli, Ticino, Switzerland
