= Roger Moore (disambiguation) =

Sir Roger Moore (1927–2017) was an English actor, most famous for his role as James Bond.

Roger Moore may also refer to:

- Roger Moore (basketball), American basketball player
- Roger Moore (computer scientist) (1939–2019), designer and implementer of APL\360
- Roger Moore (poker player) (1938–2011), member of the Poker Hall of Fame
- Roger E. Moore (born 1955), writer of roleplaying games including Dungeons & Dragons
- Roger R. Moore (1922–2020), American politician
- Rory O'Moore (c. 1600–1655), also known as Sir Roger Moore, a leader of the Irish Rebellion of 1641

== See also ==
- Moore (disambiguation)
- Roger More (disambiguation)
