= Roger More =

Roger More may refer to:

- Rory O'Moore, a.k.a. Roger More, Irish noble
- Roger More (MP)

== See also ==
- Roger Moore (disambiguation)
