= Toomas Frey =

Estonian scientist (1937–2020)

Toomas Frey (13 December 1937 – 23 September 2020) was an Estonian ecologist, geobotanist and forest scientist.

Frey was born in Põltsamaa. He was also a political leader, with the Estonian Green Movement. When he was named Minister of the Environment in 1990, it was the first time a member of a green political organisation reached a national position in any European government.
