= Emma Morosini =

Italian Roman Catholic pilgrim (1924–2020)

- Born: 8 January 1924; Castiglione delle Stiviere, Kingdom of Italy
- Died: 10 September 2020 (aged 96); Castiglione delle Stiviere, Italy
- Occupation(s): Nurse; Pilgrim

Emma Morosini (8 January 1924 – 10 September 2020) was an Italian Catholic pilgrim, known for the journeys she made from 1991 until her death. She was known as the "Italian Forrest Gump".

== Biography ==
After retiring from her career as a nurse, Morosini was diagnosed with a serious skin disease. However, she miraculously recovered at the age of 67, attributing her recovery to the Virgin Mary. From then on, she dedicated her life to her faith in return for this miracle. She visited many shrines dedicated to Mary, such as the Sanctuary of Our Lady of Lourdes, Our Lady of Pontmain, Our Lady of Guadalupe, Sanctuary of Fátima, Virgin of Larmes, Our Lady of Aparecida, Basilica della Santa Casa, and Camino de Santiago. From 1991 to 2015, she traveled more than 30,000 km on foot. On 27 December 2016, she traveled to the Basilica of Our Lady of Luján. For this occasion, she traveled over 1200 km. In April and May 2018, she traveled 900 km in 40 days to reach Our Lady of Guadalupe. She dedicated this pilgrimage to families, one of her main focuses of prayer.

In April 2015, Morosini met Pope Francis at St. Peter's Square. The Pope had personally invited her to the papal audience after touching the lives of many people following her trip to Argentina.

Emma Morosini died on 10 September 2020 at the age of 96.

== Books ==
- Pellegrina d'eccezione : 1300 km a piedi (2013)
- L'amore si fa strada (2017)
