= Vittorio Mathieu =

Italian philosopher (1923–2020)

- Born: 12 December 1923; Varazze, Kingdom of Italy
- Died: 30 September 2020 (aged 96); Chivasso, Italy
- Occupations: Philosopher; Historian

Vittorio Mathieu (12 December 1923 – 30 September 2020) was an Italian philosopher and historian.

== Biography ==
Mathieu was born in 1923 in Varazze. After his secondary studies, he enrolled in the Faculty of Law in Turin. He graduated from the University of Turin with a degree in theoretical philosophy.

Mathieu became a professor of theoretical philosophy at the University of Trieste in 1961. He then became a professor emeritus of moral philosophy at the University of Turin.

In 1994, Mathieu helped start the Forza Italia movement alongside Silvio Berlusconi, Lucio Colletti, and others. In July 2010, there were reports of Mathieu's membership in Opus Dei, but these rumors were denied by both Opus Dei and Mathieu in an address to the editorial staff of Corriere della Sera.

Throughout his career, Vittorio Mathieu made significant contributions in the fields of philosophy of science, history of philosophy, aesthetics, and civil philosophy. He died in Chivasso on 30 September 2020 at the age of 96.

== Works ==
- Bergson (1954)
- La filosofia trascendentale e l'Opus postumum di Kant (1958)
- Leibniz e Des Bosses (1960)
- L'oggettività nella scienza e nella filosofia contemporanea (1960)
- Il problema dell'esperienza (1963)
- Dio nel "Libro d'ore" di R. M. Rilke (1968)
- Dialettica della libertà (1970)
- La speranza nella rivoluzione (1972)
- Vincenzo Filippone-Thaulero (1973)
- Phénoménologie de l'esprit révolutionnaire (1974)
- "Temi e problemi della filosofia contemporanea" (1977)
- Perché punire (1980)
- Cancro in Occidente (1983)
- La voce, la musica, il demoniaco. Con un saggio sull'interpretazione musicale (1983)
- Filosofia del denaro (1985)
- Elzeviri swiftiani (1986)
- La mia prospettiva filosofica (1988)
- Gioco e lavoro (1989)
- La speranza nella rivoluzione (1992)
- Il problema del nazionalismo (1992)
- Perché leggere Plotino (1992)
- L'opus postumum di Kant (1992)
- Tipologia dei sistemi e origine della loro unità (1994)
- Orfeo e il suo canto. Scritti (1952-1993) (1996)
- Il nulla, la musica, la luce (1996)
- Il problema della fedeltà ermeneutica (1998)
- Per una cultura dell'essere (1998)
- L'uomo animale ermeneutico (2001)
- Le radici classiche dell'Europa (2002)
- Goethe e il suo diavolo custode (2002)
- Privacy e dignità dell'uomo. Una teoria della persona (2004)
- Come leggere Plotino (2004)
- Perché punire. Il collasso della giustizia penale (2008)
- Introduzione a Leibniz (2008)
- In tre giorni (2010)
- La filosofia (2014)
