= Norman Gorbaty =

American artist (1932–2020)

- Born: October 5, 1932; Brooklyn, New York, U.S.
- Died: September 26, 2020 (aged 87); Great Neck, New York
- Education: Yale University, Josef Albers, Louis Kahn
- Known for: Painting, sculpture, printmaking

Norman Gorbaty (October 5, 1932 – September 26, 2020) was an American artist who lived and worked in New York.

== Early life ==
After graduating from Amherst College, Gorbaty was the recipient of a Simpson fellowship from Amherst and a teaching fellowship from Yale University where he furthered his artistic interests in pursuit of an MFA. At Yale, he was part of an diverse milieu, influenced by a number of notable artists such as Josef Albers, Alexi Brodovitch, Leo Leonni, Herbert Matter, Bernard Chaet, Gabor Peterdi and Louis Kahn. While at Yale, Gorbaty had his prints regularly shown in the Brooklyn Museum Printmaking Annual and his master's thesis was titled, Print Making with a Spoon and was later published nearly in its entirety in Gabor Peterdi's instrumental publication Printmaking Methods Old and New.

== Career (1956–2020) ==
Despite an encouraging debut with his work being selected for the 1954 Young American Printmakers show at the Museum of Modern Art in New York, Gorbaty had decided in 1956 that he would pursue a career on Madison Avenue as a graphic designer for advertisements. He had a highly successful career working for some of the most reputable agencies in New York City, including companies such as Benton & Bowles. The choice was made largely out of the uncertainty and financial instability that the life of an artist came to embody and the desire to support his family in a relatively stable and steady career.

Throughout his fifty-year career in graphic design, Gorbaty worked on fine art projects in his spare time and eventually cumulated a large selection of works on paper, sculptures, and carvings. In recent years, works that had been previously unseen by viewers have been steadily gaining attention and recognition. In 2010, he was exhibited in a two-part solo show at Fairfield University's Walsh Gallery and Bellarmine Museum of Art. Gaining both recognition and acclaim with previously unseen works of art, as Gorbaty had an article surveying his artistic career published in the New York Times. Whether it be a painting, a print, or a sculpture, Gorbaty's works are cogent studies of form and motion and as the artist has stated, "When I think of my work, two words come to mind: movement and drawing... I am fascinated by the motion around us and often try to capture this in my work.”
