= Luigi Arisio =

Italian politician (1926–2020)

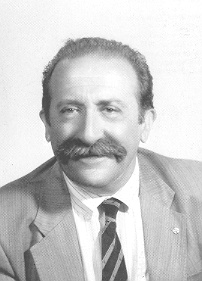
- Born: 25 March 1926; Turin, Piedmont, Italy
- Died: 29 September 2020 (aged 94); Turin, Piedmont, Italy
- Occupation: Politician
- Political party: Italian Republican

Luigi Arisio (25 March 1926 – 29 September 2020) was an Italian politician.

Arisio was born on 25 March 1926 in Turin. During his tenure with Fiat, Arisio founded a group for the company's administrative staff in 1974. On 14 October 1980, Arisio led a counterprotest of strike actions organized by a union of factory workers. The end of the 35-day strike was attributed to this action, which was regarded as an influential moment in Italian labor history. Arisio served a single term as a member of Chamber of Deputies from 1983 to 1987, representing the Italian Republican Party. His bid for reelection was not successful.

Arisio died on 29 September 2020, aged 94.

== Biography ==
The son of a skilled worker from Piedmont and a housewife, he attended the Lancia training school in the 1940s and was subsequently hired at the factory, where he began by calibrating tools. After moving to FIAT, he began a career that would lead him, by the late 1970s, to the position of foreman of the upholstery department, with responsibility for 250 employees.

In that capacity, he promoted the “Coordinating Committee of FIAT Supervisors and Managers,” which on October 14, 1980, organized the so-called “March of the Forty Thousand,” in which FIAT employees and managers protested against the violent picketing that had been blocking access to the factories for weeks in protest against the mass layoffs and furloughs announced in September by the company’s CEO, Cesare Romiti. The demonstrators, estimated at 12,000 by the Turin police, marched silently through the streets of Turin with banners and signs demanding a return to work. In the weeks that followed, the labor unions abandoned their hardline stance and favored settling the dispute with a compromise solution. Beyond its specific effects, the march of the forty thousand was considered the most significant rift between the working class and the middle class and marked the first sign of the unions’ gradual loss of influence in Italian society during the 1980s.

His youngest son, Roberto, was appointed RSA for ACQF and a member of the national executive committee (Fiat Chrysler Automobiles Middle Management Association) in 2019; this association was founded by Arisio himself. Among the cars owned by Arisio was a Lancia Delta HF 4WD that had belonged to Vittorio Ghidella, CEO of Fiat Auto.

In the subsequent general election of 1983, Luigi Arisio ran for the Chamber of Deputies as a candidate for the Italian Republican Party, appearing on the same ticket as Susanna Agnelli in the Turin-Novara-Vercelli constituency: he received 11,404 votesand was elected to the Chamber of Deputies for the 9th Legislature, during which he served as secretary of the parliamentary Labor Committee. He ran again in the subsequent 1987 general election, receiving 5,719 votes, which, however, were not sufficient for re-election.

He died on September 28, 2020, at the age of 94.
