= Stephen B. Baxter =

American historian (1929–2020)

- Born: March 8, 1929
- Died: September 15, 2020 (aged 91)
- Occupation: Historian
- Known for: President of the American Historical Association (1968)

Stephen Bartow Baxter (March 8, 1929 − September 15, 2020) was an American historian specialising in late seventeenth and early eighteenth century English history.

He was educated at Harvard University and Trinity College, Cambridge before working at Dartmouth College and the University of Missouri. He was awarded a Guggenheim Fellowship in 1959-1960, for which he spent seven years researching his biography of William III of England.

His biography of William III remains the standard scholarly study, and projects a favorable view of the King of England, 1689-1702:

William III was the Deliverer of England from the tyranny and arbitrary government of the Stuarts....He repaired and improved an obsolete system of government, and left it strong enough to withstand the stresses of the next century virtually unchanged. The army of Marlborough, and that of Wellington, and to a large extent that of Raglan, was the creation of William III. So too was the independence of the judiciary..... [His government] was very expensive; at their peak the annual expenditures of William III were four times as large as those of James II. This new scale of government was bitterly unpopular. But the new taxes, which were not in fact heavy by comparison with those borne by the Dutch, made England a great power. And they contributed to the prosperity of the country while they contributed to its strength, by the process which is now called 'pump-priming.'

== Works ==
- The Development of the Treasury, 1660-1702 (Cambridge, Mass.: Harvard University Press, 1957).
- William III and the Defense of European Liberty, 1650-1702 (New York: Harcourt, Brace and World, 1966).
- England's Rise to Greatness, 1660-1763 (Berkeley and Los Angeles: University of California Press, 1983).
