= Doak Snead =

American singer and songwriter (1949–2020)

Doak Snead (December 24, 1949–September 16, 2020) was an American singer and songwriter. Born in Bronte, Texas, he lived in Nashville, Tennessee until his death. In 1968 he was in a duo with Gosney Thornton called Tom and Billy. The Doak Snead Band appeared on the Austin music scene in 1973 as part of the Progressive Country Music movement. Snead has appeared in concert around the U.S. most notably the Kerrville Folk Festival and in a concert with the Houston Pops Orchestra in 1975.

== Discography ==
- Think of Me Sometime (1977). Produced by Huey P. Meaux and Danny Epps. Crazy Cajun Records #1096.
- Powderhorn (1978) Produced by Doak Snead and Lloyd Maines. Hearsay Records #001.
- 1015 Main: The Bastrop Demos (1988) Produced by Gary Schiff and Doak Snead.
- Inside (2001) Produced by Richard Barrow and Doak Snead. Sonic Lab Records.
- They Call Me Mister (2001) Produced by Daylon Wear and Doak Snead
- Joy and Peace for the Children compilation (2002) Produced by the American Music Therapists Association.
- After 33 1/3 years, After 33 1/3 rpm Doak Snead Band. (2008) Produced by Doak and Kelley Snead. Hearsay Records.
- "Kids Rule!" (2010) (recorded under stage name Mister Doak) Produced by Drew Ramsey and Doak Snead. CuttyStang Records.
- “And They Call Me Mister Doak!” (2012) Produced by Daylon Wear and Doak Snead. Beans in the Cupboard Studio/TuneCore.
- "Catalogue" (2017) Produced by Kelley Sallee Snead and Doak Snead. Hearsay Records.
- "A Welcome Affair" (2018) Produced by Bob Clement and Cameron Davidson. Mastermind Recordings, Nashville.

=== Other ===
Snead worked as a staff writer for Reba McEntire's publishing company and his songs have been recorded by Lari White and Avalon. The Fontaines recorded his song "Let's Hitch a Ride on Santa's Sleigh" in 2007. and Americana artist Lainie Marsh recorded Doak's "Midnight Misty Juniper" on her album, The Hills Shall Cradle Thee in 2009. In 2015, along with new age musician Tony Gerber, he produced and wrote songs for "Roses & Tumbleweeds", an album released by independent artist Kelley Sallee Snead.
