= Mamu Ram Gonder (Daunkal) =

Indian politician (died 2020)

Member of the Haryana Legislative Assembly
- In office 2009–2014
- Constituency: Nilokheri, Haryana

Personal details
- Born: 04-05-1947 Gonder, Nilokheri, India
- Died: 29 September 2020 Panchkula, Haryana, India
- Party: Indian National Lok Dal (INLD)
- Children: Rajeev and Sanjeev (sons)
- Occupation: Politician

Mamu Ram Gonder (Daunkal) (died 29 September 2020) was an Indian politician. He was a member of the Indian National Lok Dal (INLD), and served as member of the Haryana Legislative Assembly for Nilokheri between 2009 and 2014. He was a follower of Chaudhari Devi Lal, a former Deputy Prime Minister of India and served in INLD for the last 30 years.

== Life ==
Mamu Ram Daunkal also known as Mamu Ram Gonder was born to Clan Daunkal in the village of Gonder in Nilokheri, Karnal district, of Haryana, India. He did his schooling in Gonder and later on moved to Karnal.

He has had a keen interest in INLD since his childhood and he joined INLD as a youth member when he was 19 years old. He took part in number of social activities which resulted in his being appointed a youth leader. He worked continuously working as an INLD member for many years.

Gonder won the seat for the Nilokheri Constituency in the 2009 Haryana Legislative Assembly election. He served until 2014.

== Personal life ==
Mamu Ram Gonder lived with his two sons Rajeev and Sanjeev Daunkal. His wife died during Mamu Ram's election time due to cancer but he won the election with high margin. His two daughters are married.

Gonder tested positive for COVID-19 in early September 2020. After 21 days his tests came back negative. He died at a private hospital in Panchkula on 29 September 2020, aged 70; according to his son, "doctors told them that Covid has damaged his father’s lungs that led to his death".
