= Délio dos Santos =

Brazilian politician (died 2020)

Délio dos Santos (died 1 September 2020) was a Brazilian politician who served as a Deputy. He was lawyer of political prisoners during Getúlio Vargas's dictatorship.
