= Simon Hugh Piper Maddrell =

British insect physiologist (1937–2020)

- Born: 11 December 1937
- Died: 10 September 2020 (aged 82)
- Scientific career
- Fields: Insect psychology

Simon Hugh Piper Maddrell FRS (11 December 1937 – 10 September 2020) was a British insect physiologist whose work predominantly focused on insect kidney organs—the Malpighian tubules. Based at the Department of Zoology at the University of Cambridge (where he had gained his undergraduate degree, followed by a PhD), his research involved insects such as Rhodnius prolixus and later, Drosophila melanogaster. At Cambridge he was a fellow of Gonville and Caius College.

He was associated with The Company of Biologists for much of his career, including a financial advisory role.

He was elected Fellow of the Royal Society in 1981.
