= Bernard Edelman =

French jurist and philosopher (1938–2020)

- Born: 22 February 1938; Paris, France
- Died: 3 September 2020 (aged 82); Paris, France
- Occupations: Jurist; Lawyer

Bernard Edelman (22 February 1938 – 3 September 2020) was a French jurist, philosopher, and lawyer.

== Biography ==
Edelman worked as a lawyer and was a specialist in literary and artistic property as well as copyright. He also served as a lecturer at the École normale supérieure, the School for Advanced Studies in the Social Sciences, and Sciences Po. His expertise in philosophy caused him to focus on simplicity and humanity, enabling him to meet intellectuals from many different countries. He published his first novel, Verticon, in 2017.

Bernard Edelman died in Paris on 3 September 2020 at the age of 82.

== Books ==
- Le droit saisi par la photographie, Éléments pour une théorie marxiste du droit (1973)
- Légalisation de la classe ouvrière (1978)
- L'homme des foules (1981)
- La maison de Kant, Conte moral (1984)
- La propriété littéraire et artistique (1989)
- Droits d'auteur droits voisins (1993)
- Nietzsche, un continent perdu (1999)
- La Personne en danger (1999)
- Le Sacre de l'auteur (2004)
- L'Art en conflits : l'œuvre de l'esprit entre droit et sociologie (2004)
- Quand les juristes inventent le réel : la fabulation juridique (2007)
- La Cour européenne des droits de l'homme : une juridiction tyrannique ? (2008)
- Ni chose ni personne : le corps humain en question (2009)
- L'Adieu aux arts. Rapport sur l'affaire Brancusi (2011)
- Essaie sur la vie assassinée (2016)
- Vertécon (2017)
