= Alércio Dias =

Brazilian politician (died 2020)

Alércio Dias, who died on September 3, 2020, was a Brazilian lawyer and politician. He served as a Deputy from 1983 to 1987. He was involved in drawing up a new Constitution of Brazil in 1988.

In 1979, Dias became the director of Companhia de Eletricidade do Acre (Eletroacre).

His son is Feliciano Dias Neto.

Dias died at Hospital Santa Juliana in Rio Branco due to complications from gastrointestinal issues.
