= Richard Trim =

British radar engineer (1931–2020)

Richard Trim OBE (22 December 1931 – 21 September 2020) was a British radar engineer who developed technology used in air traffic control systems. He was a key figure in the development and adoption of secondary surveillance radar technology. Trim has been referred to by Raytheon as the "father of secondary radar".

== Early life and education ==
Richard Trim was born in Hackney, East London, in 1931. His schooling was disrupted during the Second World War, and he left South West Essex Technical College with no qualifications at the age of 16 and began an apprenticeship at AC Cossor Ltd.

== Career ==
After completing a five-year student apprenticeship, Trim worked on the development of airborne transponders for secondary surveillance radar, contributing to technologies that became the foundation of global air traffic control. He was later promoted to chief engineer (air) at a Cossor subsidiary, and eventually took on senior technical roles at Racal Decca, where he helped develop deep-sea and small boat marine radar systems with daylight colour displays. In the 1990s, he founded Gilden Research Ltd, focusing on adaptive signal processing technologies including SMARTSOUND used on the Docklands Light Railway.

== Awards and honours ==
Officer of the Order of the British Empire (OBE), awarded in the 1972 New Year Honours for services to exports as Technical Director of Cossor Electronics Ltd.

Department of Trade and Industry Smart Award for a microwave beacon project.

Design Council Millennium Product Award for the SMARTSOUND adaptive public address system, exhibited at the Millennium Dome.
