= Jean-Pierre Pophillat =

French painter and lithographer (1938–2020)

- Born: 29 August 1937; Vichy, France
- Died: 19 September 2020 (aged 83); Paris, France
- Occupations: Painter; Lithographer

Jean-Pierre Pophillat (29 August 1938 – 19 September 2020) was a French painter and lithographer.

== Biography ==
Born in Vichy, Pophillat spent the first nine years of his life in Lapalisse where his father was an assistant pharmacist and his mother was a piano teacher. He then moved to Le Raincy, where his parents became herbalists.

In 1957, Pophillat was admitted to the École nationale supérieure des Beaux-Arts in the studio of Roger Chapelain-Midy. He participated in an exhibition of young painters alongside Bernard Buffet, Maurice Boitel, Xavier Valls, Michel Henry, and Pierre-Henry. In 1964, he won the Prize of the Casa de Velásquez. Beginning in 1959, he participated in numerous groups, including the Salon d'Automne, of which he became a member in 1972. He was also a member of the Salon Comparaisons, the Société Nationale des Beaux-Arts, and the Salon des artistes français.

Pophillat painted at his properties in Cannes and Deauville with a bright and colorful style. He died in Paris on 19 September 2020 at the age of 83.

== Personal exhibitions ==
- Galerie Vendôme, Paris (1977)
- Château de la Bertrandière, L'Étrat (2011)
- Gallery Bund 22, Shanghai (2014)
- Ludwig Galerie, Saarlouis (2015)
- Galerie Saint-Hubet, Lyon (2015)

== Prizes ==
- Prix Antral (1963)
- Prix de la Casa Velásquez (1964)
- Médaille d'or des artistes français (1970)
- Prix de la Compagnie Transatlantique (1978)
- Grand Prix du Salon de Colombes (1985)
- Grand Prix de la ville de Blois (1987)
- Grand Prix de la ville de Tours (1987)
- Grand Prix de la ville de Nantes (1993)
