= Chen Dingchang =

Chinese scientist (1937–2020)

- Born: January 1937; Shanghai, China
- Died: September 7, 2020 (aged 83); Beijing, China
- Education: Tsinghua University
- Scientific career
- Fields: Aerospace engineering
- Workplaces: China Aerospace Science and Industry Corporation

Chinese name
- Traditional Chinese: 陳定昌
- Simplified Chinese: 陈定昌
Transcriptions
Standard Mandarin
- Hanyu Pinyin: Chén Dìngchāng

Chen Dingchang (Chinese: 陈定昌; January 1937 – 7 September 2020) was a Chinese scientist specializing in aerospace engineering.

== Biography ==
Chen was born in Shanghai, in January 1937, while his ancestral home was in Zhenjiang, Jiangsu. After graduating from Tsinghua University in 1963, he was assigned to the Second Branch of the Fifth Academy of Defense and later worked at the China Aerospace Science and Industry Corporation. He died of illness in Beijing, on September 7, 2020.

== Contribution ==
Chen developed China's first laser radar.

== Honours and awards ==
- 2009 Member of the Chinese Academy of Sciences (CAS)
