= László Gálos =

Hungarian volleyball player (1933–2020)

Personal information
- Nationality: Hungarian
- Born: 3 April 1933; Bátaszék, Hungary
- Died: 11 September 2020 (aged 87)

Sport
- Sport: Volleyball

László Gálos (3 April 1933 – 11 September 2020) was a Hungarian volleyball player. He competed in the men's tournament at the 1964 Summer Olympics.
