= Georges Azenstarck =

French photographer (1934–2020)

- Born: 1934; Paris, France
- Died: 2 September 2020 (aged 85–86); Marseille, France
- Occupation: Photographer

Georges Azenstarck (1934 – 2 September 2020) was a French photographer.

== Biography ==
Azenstarck was a reporter-photographer for L'Humanité from 1956 to 1968, when he created an association for reporter-photographers alongside his colleagues Marcel Delius, Louis Lucchesi, and Jean-Claude Seine. He also began working for La Nouvelle Vie Ouvrière. He joined the photographic agency Rapho in 1979 and traveled to over fifty countries. He was one of the few photographers to cover the Ratonnades and the May 68 protests. He worked for Roger-Viollet until his retirement.

Georges Azenstarck died in Marseille on 2 September 2020.

== Bibliography ==
- Les Rudiments du monde
- Le Siècle du dragon : un reportage et quelques réflexions sur la Chine d'aujourd'hui et peut-être de demain
- Ces patrons éclairés qui craignent la lumière
- Mon copain de Pékin
