= Jean-Léon Beauvois =

French psychologist (1943–2020)

- Born: 16 August 1943; Aix-en-Provence, France
- Died: 8 September 2020 (aged 77)
- Occupation: Psychologist

Jean-Léon Beauvois (16 August 1943 – 8 September 2020) was a French psychologist and university professor. Alongside Robert-Vincent Joule, he wrote the book Petit traité de manipulation à l'usage des honnêtes gens, which became a bestseller in France.

== Biography ==
Beauvois conducted research as a clinical psychologist operating out of Paris, Nancy, Caen, Grenoble, and Nice. He taught at Pierre Mendès-France University.

In 2007, Beauvois worked as the scientific director for the film Le Jeu de la Mort, directed by Christophe Nick and aired on France 2. Much of the film's success was attributed to Nick and Beauvois.

Jean-Léon Beauvois died on 8 September 2020 at the age of 77.

== Publications ==
- La psychologie quotidienne (1984)
- Petit traité de manipulation à l'usage des honnêtes gens (1987)
- La soumission librement consentie (1998)
- Juger de la valeur sociale des personnes : les pratiques sociales d’évaluation (2004)
- Les illusions libérales, individualisme et pouvoir social: Petit traité des grandes illusions (2005)
- Les influences sournoises. Précis des manipulations ordinaires (2011)
