= Mykola Polyakov =

Ukrainian scientist (1946–2020)

- Born: May 1, 1946; Dnipro
- Died: September 21, 2020 (aged 74)
- Education: Dnipropetrovsk National University

Mykola Polyakov (ukr. Микола Вікторович Поляков; 1 May 1946 – 21 September 2020) was a Ukrainian scientist and rector of Dnipropetrovsk National University.

== Biography ==
Mykola Polyakov was born on 1 May 1946 in Dnipropetrovsk, USSR. In 1971 Polyakov graduated from Dnipropetrovsk National University specializing in mathematics. In 1974 he obtained his Candidate of Sciences (PhD) degree, in 1983 – Doctor of Sciences (Habilitation) degree. During his student years, Polyakov was a Komsomol activist and a member of the Communist Party. Between 1989 and 1996 he was the dean of the mechanics-mathematics faculty. Between 1996 and 1998 Polyakov was a vice-rector of the DNU. In 1998 he was promoted to rector. Polyakov was the author of more than 300 scientific articles, books and inventions. Mykola Polyakov was the chief-editor of the scientific magazine "The Bulletin of the Dnipropetrovsk National University".

In 2010 Mykola Polyakov joined the Party of Regions. On October 31, 2010 he won the local election. He was a member of Dnipropetrovsk City Council.
