= Li Dongying (metallurgist) =

Chinese metallurgist (1920–2020)

- 李东英
- Born: December 14, 1920; Beijing, China
- Died: September 22, 2020 (aged 99); Beijing, China
- Education: Fu Jen Catholic University
- Scientific career
- Fields: Metallurgy; Materials science
- Workplaces: China Nonferrous Metals Industry Corporation

Chinese name
- Traditional Chinese: 李東英
- Simplified Chinese: 李东英
Transcriptions
Standard Mandarin
- Hanyu Pinyin: Lǐ Dōngyīng

Li Dongying (Chinese: 李东英; December 14, 1920 - September 22, 2020) was a Chinese metallurgist and one of the founders of China's rare metal industry.

== Biography ==
Li was born in Beijing on December 14, 1920. After graduating from Fu Jen Catholic University in 1948, he was dispatched to Shenyang as a factory manager. In 1953, he was transferred to Beijing, where he successively served as vice president, deputy chief engineer, chief engineer, and deputy party secretary of the Beijing Research Institute of Nonferrous Metals (formerly Comprehensive Research Institute of Nonferrous Metals). In December 1980, he co-founded the Chinese Society of Rare Earths (CSRE) in Beijing. On September 22, 2020, Li died in Beijing at the age of 99.

== Honours and awards ==
- 1987 State Science and Technology Progress Award (First Class)
- 1989 State Science and Technology Progress Award (First Class)
- 1995 Member of the Chinese Academy of Engineering (CAE)
- June 2012 "Engineering Award" of the 9th Guanghua Engineering Science and Technology Award
