= Conrad Roland =

German architect (1934–2020)

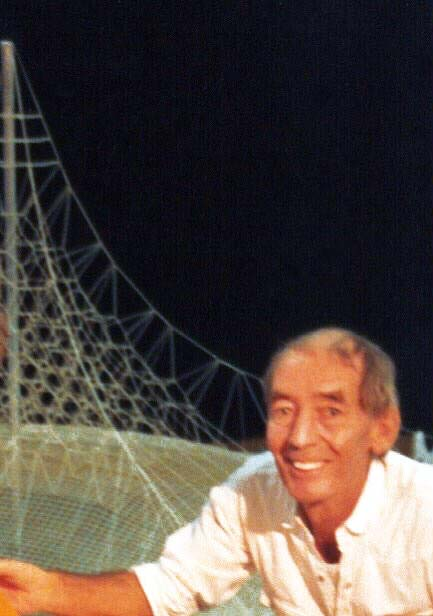
Conrad Roland

Conrad Roland (Konrad Roland Lehmann; 1934 – 25 September 2020) was a German architect and pioneer of the construction of space nets (tensile structures), which primarily are to be found as rope climbing frames on playgrounds. In 1978 he designed and constructed the biggest spacenet of the world until today, the Super Four Mast Spacenet, for the Federal Horticultural Show (BUGA).

== Life ==
Roland was born in München. After his final secondary-school examinations, he completed an apprenticeship as a carpenter. From 1954 until 1963 he studied architecture at Technical University of Munich, at the Illinois Institute of Technology in Chicago and at TU Berlin. During his studies from 1959 till 1961 he was an assistant in Mies van der Rohe's office in Chicago.

In 1963 Roland began to work self-employed in Berlin. He mainly compiled studies, projects and documentations on Hanging-houses and Spacenets. The plans for the construction of a sports stadium in Abu Dhabi, which he developed in co-operation with Jörn-Peter Schmidt-Thomsen in the 1960s, won the tendering competition, but has never been realized.

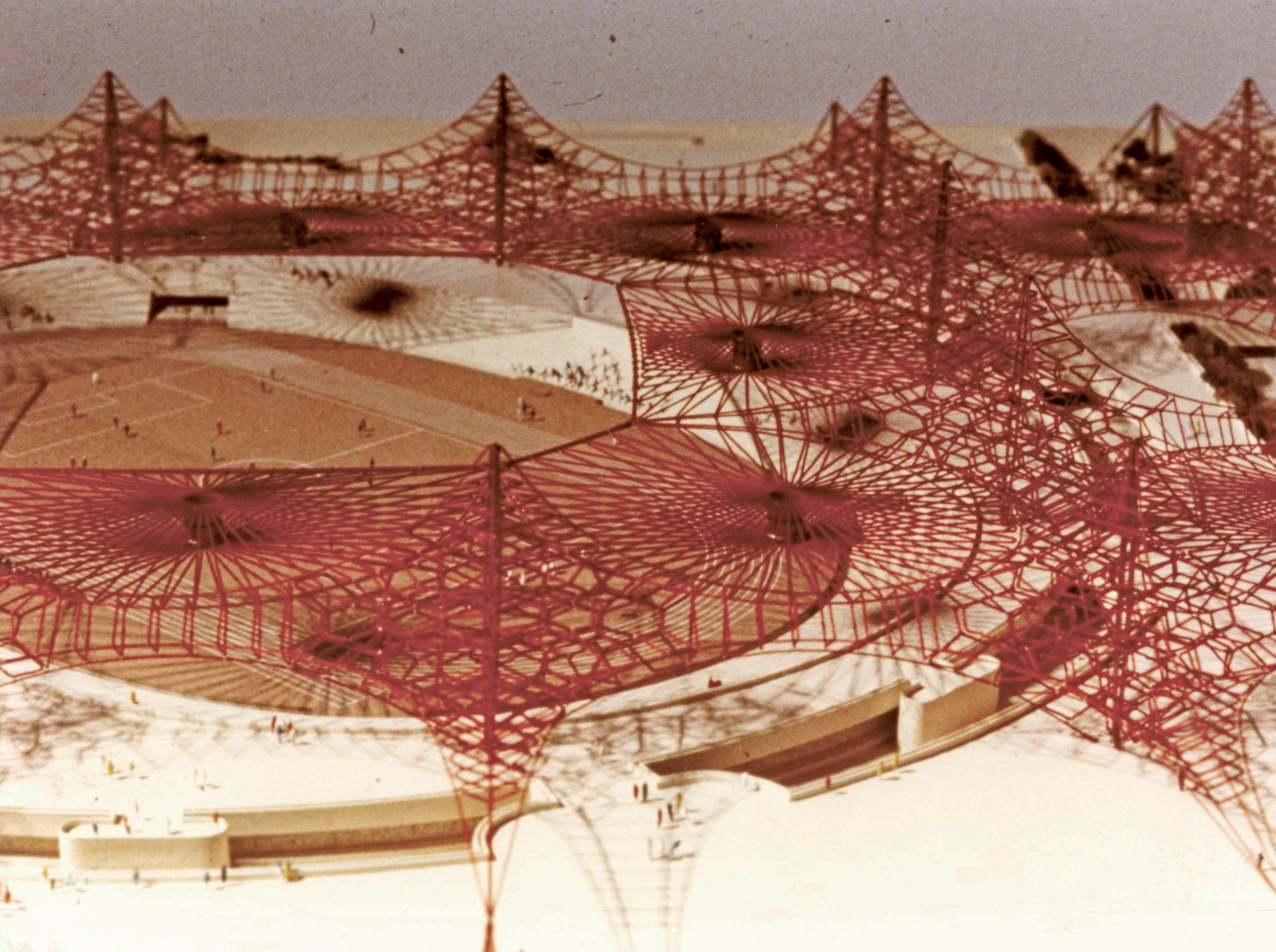
Model of the sports stadium in Abu Dhabi

The subject of spatial net architecture was elaborately covered in his book publication Frei Otto – Spannweiten (1965). A scholarship of the Graham Foundation for Advanced Studies in the Fine Arts, Chicago allowed the work of this monograph. In 1967 Roland worked as guest lecturer in Portsmouth; in 1967 and 1969 he held lectures on “Hanging Houses” in Canada and the United States.

From 1970 onwards the architect devoted himself to the development of the Play-Spacenets. His accomplishments concerning this principle of construction have been honoured with several prizes in and outside the country. In 1974 Roland founded the company “Conrad Roland Spielbau”, which planned and constructed rope play equipment and climbing nets from 1974 until 1985. The succeeding corporation COROCORD Raumnetz GmbH has been carrying the initial letters of his name in the corporate name until today.

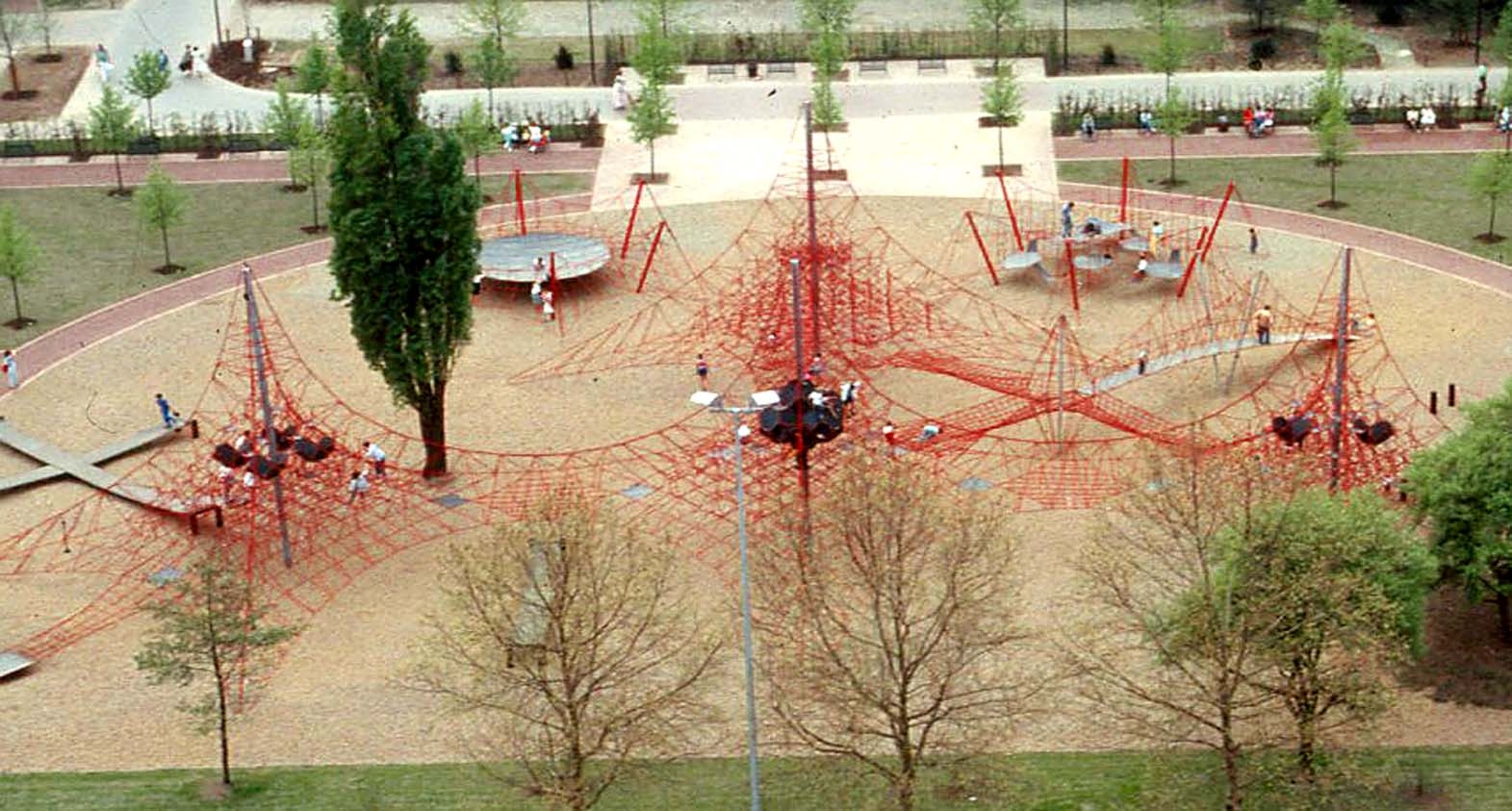
Super Four Mast Circus in Düsseldorf, Germany

Already in 1975 the “Super Two Mast Spacenet” came into being for the Federal Horticultural Show (BUGA) in Mannheim, Germany. For the BUGA in Düsseldorf in 1987 Roland constructed the biggest Spacenet of the world until today, the “Super Four Mast Spacenet” in Südpark Düsseldorf, which is still in use after remedial maintenance in 2007. Predominantly, the architect developed Spacenets for playgrounds. In his publication, such as the patent specification for “Spatial Networks” in 1974, Conrad Roland revealed the multitude of applicability of the Spacenets: e.g. multi-level sun terraces, trellis, summer houses, beach and exhibition pavilions or as frame structure for exhibition spaces and sales areas, seat and reclining furniture and also work scaffoldings.

Since 1987 Roland lived in Hawaii.

== Bibliography ==
- Conrad Roland: Frei Otto – Spannweiten. Ideen und Versuche zum Leichtbau. Ein Werkstattbericht von Conrad Roland. Ullstein, Berlin, Frankfurt/Main und Wien 1965.
