= Melih Onuş =

Turkish mathematician

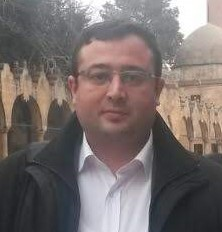
- Born: 8 February 1981; Ankara, Turkey
- Died: 10 September 2020 (aged 39); Ankara, Turkey
- Education: Bilkent University; Arizona State University
- Known for: Overlay Network Construction in Decentralized Networks
- Scientific career
- Fields: Mathematics
- Workplaces: Bartın University; Çankaya University; TOBB University; Bilkent University; Arizona State University; Los Alamos National Laboratory; ETH Zürich
- Doctoral advisor: Andrea W. Richa

Melih Onuş (8 February 1981 – 10 September 2020) was a Turkish mathematician, computer engineer and scientist. He represented Turkey in 1998 and 1999, at the International Mathematical Olympiad and was awarded a bronze and a silver medal, respectively. He died in the COVID-19 pandemic.

== Early life and education ==
Melih Onuş, who spent his early years in Ankara, completed his primary education in Iltekin Primary School and his secondary education in Atatürk Anatolian High School. During his secondary education he represented Turkey at the 39th and 40th International Mathematical Olympiad and was awarded a bronze and a silver medal, respectively.

In 2003, he graduated from Bilkent University Computer Engineering Department by completing his B.Sc. Between 2003 and 2005, he worked as a research assistant in the Department of Computer Science and Engineering at Arizona State University in the United States. In the same period, in 2004, he attended a summer school in the Computer Science department at the ETH Zurich. In 2006, at Los Alamos National Laboratory in New Mexico, he conducted his work with Hristo N. Djidjev entitled "A Scalable and Accurate Graph Clustering and Community Structure Detection". After completing his doctorate study entitled "Overlay Network Construction in Decentralized Networks" at Arizona State University under the supervision of Dr. Andr´ea W. Richa he returned to Turkey.

== Academic career ==
After returning to Turkey, he worked at TOBB University, Bilkent University and Çankaya University Computer Engineering Departments. He continued his academic life at Bartın University from 2016 until his death.

== Death ==
Melih Onuş was infected with COVID-19, while visiting his family in Ankara amid COVID-19 pandemic in 2020. He died at a hospital in Ankara on 10 September 2020. His father died 3 days later also from the virus. Both were buried in Ankara Ortaköy Cemetery.

== Awards ==
- Acknowledgment for Outstanding Work, Arizona State University, April 2006
- Silver Medal: 40th International Mathematics Olympiad, Romania, July 1999
- Bronze Medal: 6th TÜBİTAK National Mathematics Olympiad, December 1998
- Bronze Medal: 39th International Mathematics Olympiad, Taiwan, July 1998
- Silver Medal: 5th TÜBİTAK National Mathematics Olympiad, December 1997
- Gold Medal: 1st TÜBİTAK National Mathematics Olympiad, May 1996

== Research works ==
Some of Melih Onuş's works that are accepted in the international community are as follows:

1. Onus, M. ve Richa, A.W.(2016). "Parameterized maximum and average degree approximation in topic based publish subscribe overlay network design" Computer Networks 94: 307–317.
2. Djidjev, H. ve Onus, M.(2013). "Scalable and Accurate Graph Clustering and Community Structure Detection" IEEE Transactions on Parallel and Distributed Systems 24 (5): 1022- 1029.
3. Onus, M. ve Richa, A.W.(2011). "Minimum Maximum Degree Publish Subscribe Overlay Network Design" IEEE-ACM Transactions on Networking 19 (5) 1331–1343.
4. Onus, M. ve Richa, A.W.(2010). "Parameterized Maximum and Average Degree Approximation in Topic Based Publish Subscribe Overlay Network Design" International Conference on Distributed Computing Systems (ICDCS), Genova, Italy.
5. Onus, M. ve Richa, A.W.(2009). "Minimum Maximum Degree Publish Subscribe Overlay Network Design" IEEE International Conference on Computer Communications(INFOCOM), Rio de Janeiro, Brazil.
6. Onus M., Richa A.W. ve Scheideler C.(2007). "Linearization Locally Self Stabilizing Sorting in Graphs" Workshop on Algorithm Engineering and Experiments (ALENEX), New Orleans, Louisiana, USA.
7. Kothapalli K., Scheideler C., Onus M. ve Schindelhauer C.(2006). "Distributed Coloring in O(log n) bit rounds" International Parallel and Distributed Processing Symposium(IPDPS), Rhodes Island, Greece.
