= Mir Haji Muhammad Hayat Khan Talpur =

Pakistani politician (1937–2020)

Member of the Provincial Assembly of Sindh
- In office 29 May 2013 – 28 May 2018

Personal details
- Born: 13 April 1937 Digri
- Died: 7 September 2020 (aged 83)
- Party: Pakistan Peoples Party

Mir Haji Muhammad Hayat Khan Talpur (13 April 1937 – 7 September 2020) was a Pakistani politician who had been a Member of the Provincial Assembly of Sindh, from May 2013 to May 2018.

== Early life and education ==
He was born on 13 April 1937 in Digri.

He had a Bachelor of Arts degree from University of Sindh.

== Political career ==
He was elected to the Provincial Assembly of Sindh as a candidate of Pakistan Peoples Party from Constituency PS-66 MIRPUR KHAS-III in the 2013 Pakistani general election.
