= Ethan Peters =

American beauty blogger, makeup artist, and social media personality (2003–2020)

- Born: March 8, 2003; Houston, Texas, US
- Died: September 5, 2020 (aged 17); Huntsville, Texas, US
- Occupations: Makeup artist; YouTuber

YouTube information
- Channel: Ethanisupreme
- Subscribers: 125,000
- Views: 6.06 million
- Last updated: 4 August 2026

Ethan Peters (March 8, 2003 – September 5, 2020), colloquially known as Ethan Is Supreme, was an American beauty blogger, makeup artist, and social media personality. He generated a following on various social media platforms including Instagram and YouTube where he shared his avant-garde, emo, and queer-inspired style of makeup and clothing. Peters died on September 5 2020 in Texas at the age of 17.

== Career ==
Ethan Peters started using social media in the 7th or 8th grade. He created a meme account, Betch, before selling it for $25,000 at the age of 13. He then initiated his career in the beauty community and on social media. Peters became a YouTuber on April 24, 2017. He began using makeup at a young age and by the summer of 2017, he had amassed a following of 100,000 people. Peters was forced to leave his private Christian school, Alpha Omega Academy, because of his sexuality and social media activity "code of moral conduct." Even though he was not expelled from the school, the administration implied that he was not welcome, despite receiving support from fellow students. Peters started doing online school and opened the clothing line Hellboy. As of September 2020, Peters had 139,000 subscribers on YouTube and half a million followers on Instagram.

=== Artistry ===
Peters' avant-garde style included a mix of emo, gay, and designer. He described his style as "think gay but kind of dark." He gained inspiration from various music videos, including those of his favorite musical artist, Travis Scott. Other artists he admired included Miley Cyrus and Marilyn Manson. In a 2019 interview, Peters shared that he was inspired by social media personality Tana Mongeau.

== Personal life ==
Peters was from Huntsville, Texas. His parents were property investors. He was gay. Peters advocated against racism during the COVID-19 pandemic. He posted about his experience being bullied at a young age.

It has been speculated that Peters struggled with drug addiction, the likely cause of his death in his home on September 5, 2020.
