= Héctor Giorgetti =

Argentine footballer (1956–2020)

Personal information
- Full name: Héctor Ernesto Juan Giorgetti
- Date of birth: 18 January 1956
- Place of birth: General San Martín, Buenos Aires, Argentina
- Date of death: 8 September 2020 (aged 64)
- Position: Goalkeeper

Senior career*
Years	Team	Apps	(Gls)
1975–1977	Chacarita Juniors		
1977–1978	Deportes Tolima		
1978	Chacarita Juniors		
1979	Sportivo Italiano		
1980–1984	Estudiantes de Buenos Aires		
1985–1986	All Boys		
1987–1988	Huracán		
1988	Universidad de Chile		
1989–1990	Palestino		
1991–1993	Sportivo Italiano		
- * Club domestic league appearances and goals

Héctor Ernesto Juan Giorgetti (18 January 1956 – 8 September 2020) was an Argentine professional footballer who played as a goalkeeper for clubs of Argentina, Chile and Colombia.

Giorgetti was born in General San Martín, Buenos Aires, Argentina. Called the "Mono" or "Loco", he emerged in Chacarita Juniors, followed by Deportes Tolima of Colombia. He returned to Argentina playing in Estudiantes de Buenos Aires, All Boys, Sportivo Italiano and Huracán. In this last he played in first and promotion.

In 1988 he arrived at Universidad de Chile, descending with the team to second division. The following year he played for Palestino and ended his football career in Sportivo Italiano.

== Teams ==
- Chacarita Juniors 1975–1977
- Deportes Tolima 1977–1978
- Chacarita Juniors 1978
- Sportivo Italiano 1979
- Estudiantes de Buenos Aires 1980–1984
- All Boys 1985–1986
- Huracán 1987–1988
- Universidad de Chile 1988
- Palestino 1989–1990
- Sportivo Italiano 1991–1993
