= Bill Power (footballer) =

Australian rules footballer (1937–2020)

Personal information
- Full name: William David Power
- Born: 30 October 1937
- Died: 13 September 2020 (aged 82)
- Height: 179 cm (5 ft 10 in)
- Weight: 79 kg (174 lb)

Playing career^{1}
Years	Club	Games (Goals)
1957–61	South Melbourne	51 (27)
- ^{1} Playing statistics correct to the end of 1961.

William David Power (30 October 1937 – 15 September 2020) was an Australian rules footballer who played with South Melbourne in the Victorian Football League (VFL).
