= Luba Perchyshyn =

American businesswoman and crafter (1923–2020)

- Люба Перчишин
- Luba Perchyshyn, from a 1946 newspaper.
- Born: Luba Mary Procai; October 10, 1923; Minneapolis, Minnesota, United States
- Died: September 7, 2020 (aged 96); Minneapolis, Minnesota, United States
- Occupations: Businesswoman, folk artist
- Years active: 1940s to 2010s
- Known for: Pysanky eggs, classes, tools, books, and kits

Luba Perchyshyn (Note: Ukrainian: Люба Перчишин, romanized: Liuba Perchyshyn) (October 10, 1923 – September 7, 2020, born Luba Mary Procai) was an American businesswoman and crafter who promoted the art of pysanky, Ukrainian decorated eggs.

== Early life ==
Luba Procai was born in Minneapolis, Minnesota, the daughter of Marie Sokol and Anthony B. Procai. Both of her parents were Ukrainian immigrants.

== Career ==
In 1947, Perchyshyn and her mother started a Ukrainian gift shop, selling traditional embroidery, tapestries, and ceramics, as well as books. They started from home, but soon moved into a storefront on Hennepin Avenue, where Luba Perchyshyn began assembling kits for making pysanky, intricately decorated eggs made with a wax-resist technique. Another family member, Luba's sister Johanna Luciow, joined the business in 1958.

In time, the pysanky classes, kits, tools, and other supplies became the shop's signature items. Perchyshyn demonstrated the process on television, on videos, and at cultural events. The Ukrainian Gift Shop was featured in a National Geographic article in 1972, and Perchyshyn's decorated eggs were featured in a 1976 short documentary about pysanky by Slavko Nowytski.

Perchyshyn co-authored several books, including Ukrainian Easter Eggs and How We Make Them (1979), and The Ukrainian Design Book (1999). Perchyshyn's eggs were admired and sold internationally, and were included in White House holiday decorations and events.

== Personal life and legacy ==
Luba Procai married Elko Perchyshyn in 1943, while he was serving in World War II. They had children, Natalie and Elko. Luba Perchyshyn was widowed in 1986, and she died in 2020, aged 96 years.

Marie Sokol Procai died in 1994, and Johanna Procai Luciow died in 1998; the Perchyshyn family continued the business, which remains in operation as of 2020. Her granddaughter Ally Perchyshyn continues to teach pysanky classes in Minneapolis.
