= Brigitte Peskine =

French author and screenwriter (1951–2020)

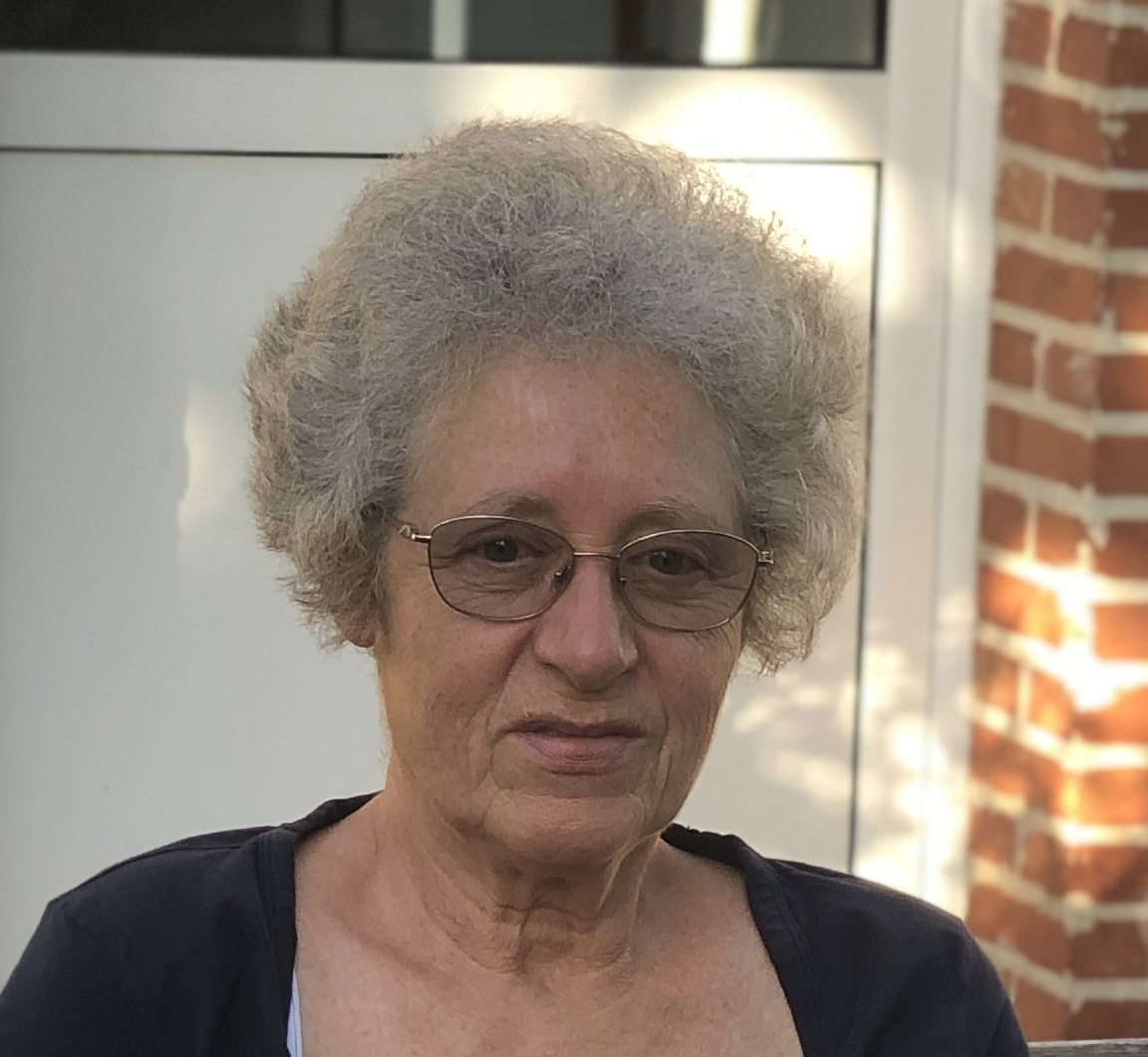
- Brigitte Peskine
- Born: 30 December 1951; Neuilly-sur-Seine, France
- Died: 5 September 2020 (aged 68); Paris, France
- Occupations: Author; Screenwriter

Brigitte Peskine (30 December 1951 – 5 September 2020) was a French author and screenwriter.

== Biography ==
Peskine began writing at the age of 23 after leaving Paris, where she had spent her childhood. She moved to Strasbourg and began working at the Institut national de la statistique et des études économiques as an attaché. Four years later, she moved to Venezuela with her husband and children.

Returning to Paris in 1981, Peskine continued her career as a statistician and a novelist. In 1985, she published her first novel, Le Ventriloque with Actes Sud. Other books would follow in children's fiction and adult literature. Inspired by her daughters, she appeared on the television show La Famille Fontaine, broadcast on France 2 and France 3 from 1989 to 1990. She then devoted herself entirely to screenwriting and authoring.

Following her new career path, she purchased a house in Berry and spent her time living in Paris and Massay. Brigitte Peskine died on 5 September 2020 in Paris at the age of 68.

== Publications ==
=== Novels ===
- Le Ventriloque (1985)
- Et la famille ? Ça va, merci (1986)
- L'Échappée (1988)
- Une robe pour Julia (1992)
- Les Eaux douces d'Europe (1996)
- L'Enfant oublié (1997)
- Buena Familia (2002)
- Intimes Convictions (2004)

=== Children's books ===
- Ça s'arrangera (1985)
- La télé, c'est pas la vie (1986)
- Une odeur de poisson (1988)
- La Famille Fontaine (1989)
- Tout schuss (1990)
- Chantages (1990)
- Chef de famille (1992)
- La Petite Annonce (1993)
- Un père de trop (1995)
- Sarah (1996)
- Le Journal de Clara (1997)
- Le Mal dans la peau (2000)
- Mon grand petit frère (2001)
- Merci papa, merci maman (2001)
- La Grande Brasse (2001)
- Pour un oui, pour un non (2002)
- Comme un poisson hors de l'eau (2002)
- La Vérité vraie (2002)
- J'entends pleurer la nuit (2002)
- Pile ou face (2003)
- L'Île de mon père (2003)
- Moi, Delphine, 13 ans... (2004)
- Zaïna, cavalière de l'Atlas (2005)
- Famille de cœur (2005)
- Les Jumeaux de l'île rouge (2014)

=== Essays ===
- Femmes expatriées (1984)
- Un scénario nommé Désir (1994)

== Screenwriting ==
=== Television ===
- En cas de bonheur (1989)
- La Famille Fontaine (1990)
- Le Second Voyage (1990)
- Des cornichons au chocolat (1991)
- Une famille pas comme les autres (1992)
- Les Compagnons de l'aventure : Lola et les Sardines (1992)
- Carré d'as (1992)
- Seconde B (1993)
- C'est mon histoire (1993)
- Fantômette (1994)
- Papa reviant demain (1996)
- Sarah (1996)
- Les Malheurs de Sophie (1998)
- Un père de plus (1998)
- La Clef des champs (1998)
- Combats de femmes (2000)
- La Kiné (2001)
- Agrippine (2001)
- La Bête du Gévaudan (2002)
- Qui mange quoi (2002)
- Le juge est une femme (2002)
- Les Enfants du miracle (2002)
- Docteur Dassin, généraliste (2003)
- Qui mange quand (2004)
- Granny boom (2004)
- Qui mange où (2005)
- Plus belle la vie (2007)
- Supergranny.com (2007)
- Guy Môquet, un amour fusillé (2008)
- Père et Maire (2009)
- Comme un mauvais souvenir (2009)
- Candice Renoir (2011)

=== Documentaries ===
- M. Neuwirth, tenez bon (2008)
- Le Marché de l'amour (2012)
- Le Lotus dans tous ses états (2012)
