= Ismail Molla =

Greek politician (1938–2020)

MP

Personal details
- Born: 1938; Komotini
- Died: 2 September 2020 (aged 81–82)
- Parent: Hussein (father)

Ismail Molla Rodoplou (Greek: Ισμαήλ Μολά Ροδοπλού Ismaíl Molá Rodoploú, 1938 – 2 September 2020) was a Greek politician who served as an MP.

He was born in Komotini in 1938, the son of Hussein.

He died after suffering a stroke on 2 September 2020.
