= David Hinchliffe (footballer) =

Australian rules footballer (1939–2020)

Personal information
- Full name: David Hinchliffe
- Born: 12 January 1939; Geelong
- Died: 27 September 2020 (aged 81); Surfers Paradise
- Height: 185 cm (6 ft 1 in)
- Weight: 84 kg (185 lb)

Playing career^{1}
Years	Club	Games (Goals)
1960	Geelong	3 (0)
- ^{1} Playing statistics correct to the end of 1960.

David Hinchliffe (12 January 1939 – 27 September 2020) was an Australian rules footballer who played with Geelong in the Victorian Football League (VFL).
