= Mohamed Haytham Khayat =

Syrian physician (1937–2020)

- محمد هيثم الخيَّاط
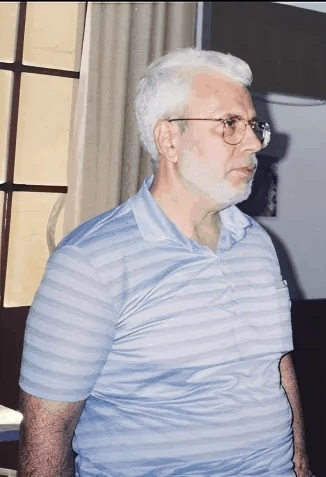
- Born: 1937; Damascus, Syria
- Died: 5 September 2020 (aged 82–83); Cairo, Egypt
- Other names: M. H. Khayat
- Occupations: Physician and lexicographer

Signature
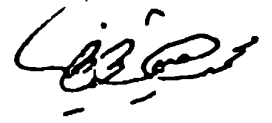

Mohamed Haytham Khayat (Arabic: محمد هيثم الخيَّاط) (1937 – 5 September 2020) was a Syrian physician and lexicographer. He was a senior policy advisor to the World Health Organization Regional Directory for the Eastern Mediterranean, a member of both the Board of Trustees of the International Union of Muslim Scholars, and the Board of Trustees of the Islamic Organization for Medical Sciences. He was known for his major contribution to the Unified Medical Dictionary (UMD).

Khayat was born in Damascus, Syria, in 1937. He was educated at Damascus University, Faculty of Medicine, where he was awarded a Bachelor of Medicine, Bachelor of Surgery in 1959. He has published more than 25 books on medicine, health, chemistry, botany, Arabic language, and Islamic ethics in Arabic, French and English, including some dictionaries. He has also published hundreds of articles in Arabic, French, English, German and Italian in various fields.

He died on 5 September 2020 in Cairo, Egypt.
