= Ken McKim =

Canadian football player (1925–2020)

Profile
- Position: Guard

Personal information
- Born: 1925; Toronto, Ontario, Canada
- Died: September 30, 2020 (aged 94–95); London, Ontario, Canada
- Listed height: 6 ft 0 in (1.83 m)
- Listed weight: 190 lb (86 kg)

Career history
- 1946–1948: Toronto Argonauts
- 1951: Saskatchewan Roughriders

Awards and highlights
- Grey Cup champion (1946, 1947)

Kenneth Robert McKim (1925 – September 30, 2020) was a Canadian professional football player who played for the Toronto Argonauts and Saskatchewan Roughriders. He won the Grey Cup with Toronto in 1946 and 1947.
