= Parrerito =

Brazilian sertanejo singer (1953–2020)

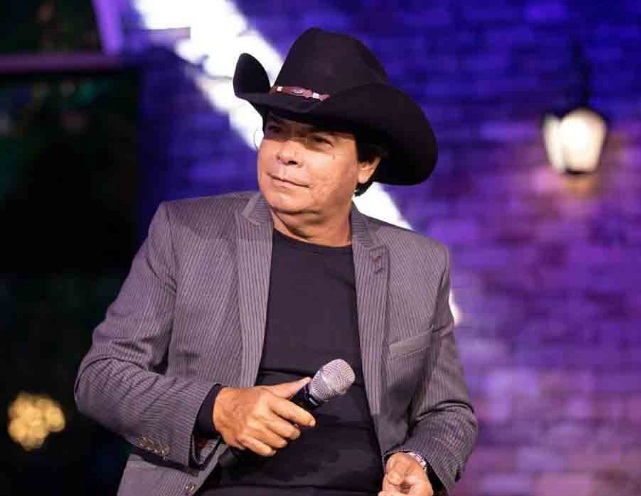

Background information
- Also known as: Eduardo Neves Borges
- Born: June 20, 1953; São Fidélis, Rio de Janeiro, Brazil
- Died: September 13, 2020 (aged 67) Belo Horizonte, Minas Gerais, Brazil
- Genres: Música sertaneja
- Instruments: Vocals, Guitar
- Years active: 1986–2020
- Formerly of: Trio Parada Dura

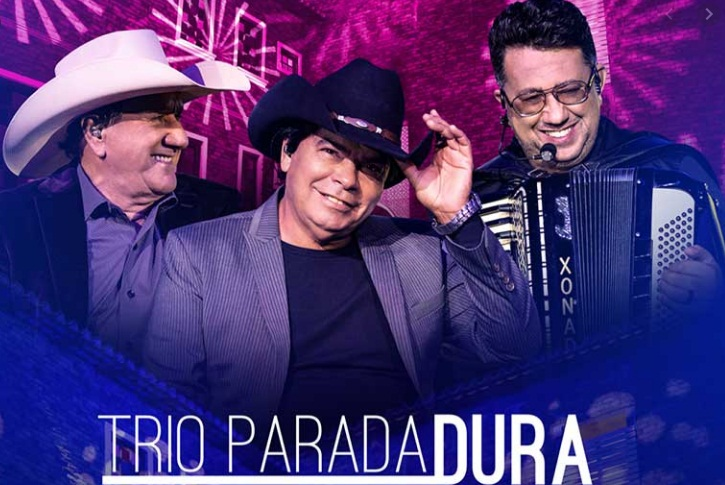
Parrerito with vocalist Creone and accordionist Xonadão. Together, they made up the 7th lineup of Trio Parada Dura (2016-2020).

Eduardo Neves Borges, better known as Parrerito (São Fidélis, 20 June 1953 – Belo Horizonte, 13 September 2020), was a Brazilian singer of sertanejo music, who gained national prominence for being a member of Trio Parada Dura. He was the brother of the singer Barrerito.

== Biography ==
A singer, guitarist and composer, Eduardo Neves Borges was born in São Fidélis, in the state of Rio de Janeiro, in 1953.

On 6 September 1982, his brother Barrerito and the other members of Trio Parada Dura suffered a plane crash in the city of Espírito Santo do Pinhal, in the interior of the state of São Paulo. The accident left Barrerito paraplegic, and Parrerito provisionally took his brother's place in the trio, while his brother was undergoing treatment. A few months later, Barrerito returned to Trio Parada Dura and Parrerito left.

In 1986, alongside Catalão and Marcel he formed the Trio Para Bilhões and changed his stage name to Roserito. O Trio Para Bilhões tevehumb vida curta e durou de 1986 até 1988. With Trio Para Bilhões Parrerito, at the time Roserito, recorded 2 LP's entitled: Trio Para Bilhões (1986) and Espelho Velho (1988).

In 1988, Barrerito decided to leave the Trio Parada Dura and pursue a solo career; after this, Parrerito abandoned the stage name "Roserito" and returned permanently to the Trio Parada Dura; he debuted in the Trio Parada Dura with the recording of LP "Nos Braços do Povo" (1988).

Parrerito was part of the Trio Parada Dura from 1988 until 2006, when he and Creone left the trio and formed a country duo called Os Parada Dura; years later, the duo became a trio again with arrival of accordion player Xonadão.

In 2013, Parrerito, Creone and Xonadão went to court and tried to acquire the right to exploit the stage name "Trio Parada Dura", but they did not succeed. Therefore, the stage name "Trio Parada Dura" was registered as owned by accordion player and founder of Trio Parada Dura, Mangabinha.

In 2015, Mangabinha died after suffering a stroke and his family ceded the right to use the stage name "Trio Parada Dura" to Parrerito, Creone and Xonadão.

With the Trio Parada Dura, Parrerito recorded 5 LPs, 4 CDs and 3 DVDs.

== Death ==
On 29 August 2020, during the COVID-19 pandemic in Brazil, Parrerito was admitted to a private hospital in Belo Horizonte. He tested positive for COVID-19 and was hospitalized.

On 31 August 2020, Parrerito's condition deteriorated suddenly. He was then moved to ICU, but after being hospitalized for sixteen days, he died on 13 September 2020, from complications of COVID-19.
