= Henry van Ameringen =

American philanthropist (1930–2020)

Henry Pfaltz van Ameringen (October 19, 1930 – September 9, 2020) was an American philanthropist.

== Early life and family ==
Henry van Ameringen was born on October 19, 1930, in South Orange, New Jersey, to a wealthy family, with his father among the founders of International Flavors and Fragrances.

== Career and philanthropy ==
In 1985, he helped to found an organization called God's Love We Deliver that provides meals to people with AIDS. He also served as an executive of International Flavors & Fragrances.

During his lifetime, van Ameringen donated around $200 million to LGBT and AIDS-related causes and supported organizations such as Lambda Legal, GMHC (formerly Gay Men's Health Crisis), and God's Love We Deliver.

== Recognition ==
- Funders for LGBTQ Issues (2017)
