= Viktor Nikitin (writer) =

Russian writer, playwright, and editor (1960–2020)

Viktor Nikolaevich Nikitin (15 November 1960 – 30 September 2020) was a Russian writer, playwright and editor. He was a member of the Union of writers of Russia.

== Biography ==
Nikitin graduated from the Voronezh Institute of Civil Engineering in the road traffic department. He lived in Voronezh and worked in his early years as a prose editor in the magazine Pod"yom; from 2005 to 2015, he was the editor of the prose department of the «Russkiy pereplot» portal.

== Writing career ==
Nikitin started writing in 1986 (when his first story, Clever, was published in the Voronezh newspaper Molodoy Kommunar). His works were published in the magazines Rise, Moscow, Zvezda, Our Contemporary, October, Siberian Lights, Russian Echo, Gates of Siberia, Don, North, Russian Federation today; and in the newspapers Komsomolskaya Pravda, Literaturnaya Gazeta, Uchitelskaya Gazeta, Rossiyskiy Pisatel, Interpol-Express and others. He wrote stories, essays, and plays, including Open / Closed, 2004; Viva Stalin!, 2006; Drinking with Chekhov, 2006; A horse has hooves, a man has legs, 2007; Death of the Middle Class, 2008; Afternoon Cruel Disappointment, 2009; and the novel Songs of the Working Class, published in 2011.

The main theme of his work was the impossibility of the presence of a traditional person in the modern world, with a place for "black humor" and mysticism, irony and sarcasm, satire and grotesque.

His 2005 novel Will Disappear Like Birds was a complex, multifaceted work about the life of a "superfluous person" in the Soviet era, and then in democratic market times, saturated with allusions and presenting a phantasmagoric picture of an unstable world.

== Death ==
Nikitin died from COVID-19 in Voronezh, on 30 September 2020, aged 59, during the COVID-19 pandemic in Russia.

== Selected works ==
- Will disappear like birds (novel). Tsentral'no-Chernozemnoye kn. izd-vo, Voronezh, 2007
- Two stories // Rise (journal). - 1995. - No. 1-2.
- Indeed (stories) // Russian binding. - 2002, November 3.
- Other doors // Russian binding. - 2001, September 8.
- Life in the other direction (story) // Star. - 2011. - No. 10.
- Playing with a stranger (story) // Russian binding. - 2010, September 27.
- Dead beetles // Russian binding. - 2004, April 15.
- Nobody (story) // Rise (journal). - 1996. - No. 7.
- Mastering space: Stories and stories. - 2013.
- Slap in the face (story) // Russian binding. - 2003, September 21.
- Pushinka (story) // Literary newspaper. - 2011, January 26.
- Serial killer; Classmate (stories) // Russian binding. - 2006, March 19.
- Fedya Fedyovkin (story) // Russian binding. - 2005, March 15.
- The hour of decay (story) // Russian binding. - 2004, March 8.
- For you — 2: Sat. stories / Civil Literary Forum of Russia. - M. : Publishing house "PoRog", 2012. ISBN 978-5-902377-37-5
- Playing with a stranger: Stories. - Voronezh, Center for Spiritual Revival of the Black Earth Region, 2013—320 p. ISBN 978-5-91338-088-3
- Nowadays. Anthology of Contemporary Russian Literature. Volume 4. - M.; "Publishing House of the Literary Institute named after A. M. Gorky "; M. : Publishing house of the magazine "Youth"; Literary Fund "The Road of Life", 2013. ISBN 978-5-7060-0144-5
- Modern Voronezh prose - Voronezh: GBUK VO "Rise" magazine, 2015. ISBN 978-5-9906964-5-7
- Life the other way. - Tambov: LLC "TPS", 2017. ISBN 978-5-9500762-2-0

== Awards and recognition ==
- Prize of the "Russian binding" portal - "for the best story published in 2001"
- Prize of the "Rise" magazine - "for works published in 2001–2002"
- Prize "Russian binding" (2005) - "for the novel" Disappear like birds "
- Prize "Russian speech" of the magazine "Rise" (2003) - "for stories published in the magazine in 2001–2003."
- Prize "Russian Binding" (2011) - "for the play "Songs of the Working Class"".
- Prize "Native Speech" (2013) - for the best prose in 2012 (the stories "Life in the Other Way" and "House with Green Balconies").
- Prize "Koltsovsky Krai" (2016) - for journalism.
- Prize "Koltsovsky Krai" (2017) - for prose (story "The Mother of God of All Sleepers").
- Prize "Koltsovsky Territory" (2018) - for the book "Life in the Other Side".
