= Roger R. Moore =

American politician (1922–2020)

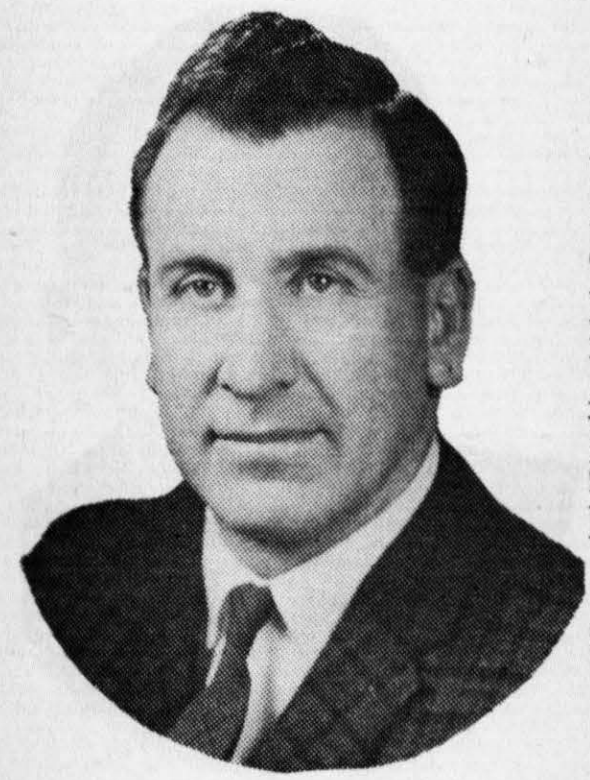

Member of the South Dakota House of Representatives for the 24th district
- In office 1963–1966
- In office 1969–1970

Personal details
- Born: August 4, 1922 Ree Heights, South Dakota, U.S.
- Died: September 21, 2020 (aged 98) Brookings, South Dakota, U.S.
- Party: Democratic
- Spouse: Delores Griese
- Children: five
- Profession: farmer

Roger R. Moore (August 4, 1922 – September 21, 2020) was an American politician in the state of South Dakota. He has been a member of the South Dakota House of Representatives. With a high school education, Moore has been a farmer, partsman, and insurance agent.
