= Nicolas Wildhaber =

Swiss swimmer (1929–2020)

Personal information
- Born: 8 December 1929 Zürich, Switzerland
- Died: 26 September 2020 (aged 90)

Sport
- Sport: Swimming

Nicolas Wildhaber (8 December 1929 – 26 September 2020) was a Swiss breaststroke swimmer. He competed at the 1948 Summer Olympics and the 1960 Summer Olympics.
