= Enzo Golino =

Italian journalist and literary critic (1932–2020)

- Born: 18 March 1932; Naples, Italy
- Died: 18 September 2020 (aged 88); Rome, Italy
- Occupations: Journalist, literary critic

Enzo Golino (18 March 1932 – 18 September 2020) was an Italian journalist, literary critic, and the author of several books.
