= Lotte Strauss (author) =

German author (1913–2020)

- Born: Lotte Schloss; August 2, 1913; Braunschweig, Duchy of Brunswick, German Empire (now Lower Saxony, Germany)
- Died: September 6, 2020 (aged 107); New York City, New York State, United States
- Occupation: Author

Lotte Strauss (born Lotte Schloss; August 2, 1913 – September 6, 2020) was a German-born author who wrote about her experiences as a Jewish woman in Nazi Germany.

== Biography ==
Strauss was born to Louis Schloss (1881–1967) and Johanna Bildesheim (1885–1942) in Braunschweig, Germany in August 1913. She had a brother named Helmut (1915–1991). She was married to Herbert Arthur Strauss (1918–2005).

Between 1942 and 1943, Strauss and her husband hid in Berlin to avoid arrest by German authorities. They were finally able to flee to Switzerland with the help of her uncle Ludwig Schöneberg. In 1946, the couple had a daughter, Jane Helen. That same year, they immigrated to the United States, moving to New York.

In New York, Strauss worked as a secretary at the New York State League of Women Voters.

The film We Were German Jews (1981), directed by Michael Blackwood, followed Strauss and her husband as they fled Germany. In 1997, Strauss published Over the Green Hill: Personal Memoir, Germany 1913-43.

Strauss died in September 2020 at the age of 107.
