= 2020 in the United States =

- Decades: 2000s; 2010s; 2020s; 2030s
- See also: History of the United States (2016–present); Timeline of United States history (2010–present); List of years in the United States

The following is a list of notable events, births and deaths from 2020 in the United States.

The US was heavily impacted by the COVID-19 pandemic, which by the end of the year killed over 300,000 people within American borders. America also became a political battleground for various issues, with various instances of racism and more so police brutality commencing a wide movement of racial unrest and the George Floyd protests. The year has been characterized by some as among the most tumultuous in American history.

Donald Trump was a central figure to American politics during his final full year of his first term as president, which saw not only the pandemic and racial unrest but also Trump's first impeachment trial and the appointment of Amy Coney Barrett to the Supreme Court. While Trump lost the 2020 election to former Vice President Joe Biden, he disputed the result of the election, and his efforts to overturn the election continues for years. Even after his 2025 inauguration he continued to make claims that the election was stolen.

== Incumbents ==
=== Federal government ===
- President: Donald Trump (R-Florida)
- Vice President: Mike Pence (R-Indiana)
- Chief Justice: John Roberts (Maryland)
- Speaker of the House: Nancy Pelosi (D-California)
- Senate Majority Leader: Mitch McConnell (R-Kentucky)
- Congress: 116th

==== State governments ====
Governors and lieutenant governors

=== Governors ===
- Governor of Alabama: Kay Ivey (Republican)
- Governor of Alaska: Mike Dunleavy (Republican)
- Governor of Arizona: Doug Ducey (Republican)
- Governor of Arkansas: Asa Hutchinson (Republican)
- Governor of California: Gavin Newsom (Democratic)
- Governor of Colorado: Jared Polis (Democratic)
- Governor of Connecticut: Ned Lamont (Democratic)
- Governor of Delaware: John Carney (Democratic)
- Governor of Florida: Ron DeSantis (Republican)
- Governor of Georgia: Brian Kemp (Republican)
- Governor of Hawaii: David Ige (Democratic)
- Governor of Idaho: Brad Little (Republican)
- Governor of Illinois: J. B. Pritzker (Democratic)
- Governor of Indiana: Eric Holcomb (Republican)
- Governor of Iowa: Kim Reynolds (Republican)
- Governor of Kansas: Laura Kelly (Democratic)
- Governor of Kentucky: Andy Beshear (Democratic)
- Governor of Louisiana: John Bel Edwards (Democratic)
- Governor of Maine: Janet Mills (Democratic)
- Governor of Maryland: Larry Hogan (Republican)
- Governor of Massachusetts: Charlie Baker (Republican)
- Governor of Michigan: Gretchen Whitmer (Democratic)
- Governor of Mississippi: Phil Bryant (Republican) (until January 14), Tate Reeves (Republican) (since January 14)
- Governor of Missouri: Mike Parson (Republican)
- Governor of Minnesota: Tim Walz (Democratic)
- Governor of Montana: Steve Bullock (Democratic)
- Governor of Nebraska: Pete Ricketts (Republican)
- Governor of Nevada: Steve Sisolak (Democratic)
- Governor of New Hampshire: Chris Sununu (Republican)
- Governor of New Jersey: Phil Murphy (Democratic)
- Governor of New Mexico: Michelle Lujan Grisham (Democratic)
- Governor of New York: Andrew Cuomo (Democratic)
- Governor of North Carolina: Roy Cooper (Democratic)
- Governor of North Dakota: Doug Burgum (Republican)
- Governor of Ohio: Mike DeWine (Republican)
- Governor of Oklahoma: Kevin Stitt (Republican)
- Governor of Oregon: Kate Brown (Democratic)
- Governor of Pennsylvania: Tom Wolf (Democratic)
- Governor of Rhode Island: Gina Raimondo (Democratic)
- Governor of South Carolina: Henry McMaster (Republican)
- Governor of South Dakota: Kristi Noem (Republican)
- Governor of Tennessee: Bill Lee (Republican)
- Governor of Texas: Greg Abbott (Republican)
- Governor of Utah: Gary Herbert (Republican)
- Governor of Vermont: Phil Scott (Republican)
- Governor of Virginia: Ralph Northam (Democratic)
- Governor of Washington: Jay Inslee (Democratic)
- Governor of West Virginia: Jim Justice (Republican)
- Governor of Wisconsin: Tony Evers (Democratic)
- Governor of Wyoming: Mark Gordon (Republican)

=== Lieutenant governors ===
- Lieutenant Governor of Alabama: Will Ainsworth (Republican)
- Lieutenant Governor of Alaska: Kevin Meyer (Republican)
- Lieutenant Governor of Arkansas: Tim Griffin (Republican)
- Lieutenant Governor of California: Eleni Kounalakis (Democratic)
- Lieutenant Governor of Colorado: Dianne Primavera (Democratic)
- Lieutenant Governor of Connecticut: Susan Bysiewicz (Democratic)
- Lieutenant Governor of Delaware: Bethany Hall-Long (Democratic)
- Lieutenant Governor of Florida: Jeanette Nunez (Republican)
- Lieutenant Governor of Georgia: Geoff Duncan (Republican)
- Lieutenant Governor of Hawaii: Josh Green (Democratic)
- Lieutenant Governor of Idaho: Janice McGeachin (Republican)
- Lieutenant Governor of Illinois: Juliana Stratton (Democratic)
- Lieutenant Governor of Indiana: Suzanne Crouch (Republican)
- Lieutenant Governor of Iowa: Adam Gregg (Republican)
- Lieutenant Governor of Kansas: Lynn Rogers (Democratic)
- Lieutenant Governor of Kentucky: Jacqueline Coleman (Democratic)
- Lieutenant Governor of Louisiana: Billy Nungesser (Republican)
- Lieutenant Governor of Maryland: Boyd Rutherford (Republican)
- Lieutenant Governor of Massachusetts: Karyn Polito (Republican)
- Lieutenant Governor of Michigan: Garlin Gilchrist (Democratic)
- Lieutenant Governor of Minnesota: Peggy Flanagan (Democratic)
- Lieutenant Governor of Mississippi: Tate Reeves (Republican) (until January 14), Delbert Hosemann (Republican) (since January 14)
- Lieutenant Governor of Missouri: Mike Kehoe (Republican)
- Lieutenant Governor of Montana: Mike Cooney (Democratic)
- Lieutenant Governor of Nebraska: Mike Foley (Republican)
- Lieutenant Governor of Nevada: Kate Marshall (Democratic)
- Lieutenant Governor of New Jersey: Sheila Oliver (Democratic)
- Lieutenant Governor of New Mexico: Howie Morales (Democratic)
- Lieutenant Governor of New York: Kathy Hochul (Democratic)
- Lieutenant Governor of North Carolina: Dan Forest (Republican)
- Lieutenant Governor of North Dakota: Brent Sanford (Republican)
- Lieutenant Governor of Ohio: Jon A. Husted (Republican)
- Lieutenant Governor of Oklahoma: Matt Pinnell (Republican)
- Lieutenant Governor of Pennsylvania: John Fetterman (Democratic)
- Lieutenant Governor of Rhode Island: Daniel McKee (Democratic)
- Lieutenant Governor of South Carolina: Pamela Evette (Republican)
- Lieutenant Governor of South Dakota: Larry Rhoden (Republican)
- Lieutenant Governor of Tennessee: Randy McNally (Republican)
- Lieutenant Governor of Texas: Dan Patrick (Republican)
- Lieutenant Governor of Utah: Spencer Cox (Republican)
- Lieutenant Governor of Vermont: David Zuckerman (Progressive)
- Lieutenant Governor of Virginia: Justin Fairfax (Democratic)
- Lieutenant Governor of Washington: Cyrus Habib (Democratic)
- Lieutenant Governor of Wisconsin: Mandela Barnes (Democratic)

== Ongoing events ==
- COVID-19 pandemic in the United States
- United States racial unrest (2020–2023)
- 2020 United States elections

== Events ==
=== January ===
- January 1
  - Recreational marijuana becomes legal in Illinois.
  - Several new regulations take effect in the United States, including new regulations on retirement funds, new minimum wage rules, and new overtime rules.
  - Public Domain Day: All books and films published in 1924 enter the public domain in the United States.
- January 3 – 2019–2021 Persian Gulf crisis: President Donald Trump approves the targeted killing of Iranian general Qasem Soleimani and Iraqi paramilitary leader Abu Mahdi al-Muhandis in Baghdad, Iraq.
- January 5 – The 77th Golden Globe Awards are held in Beverly Hills, California.
- January 6 – Former film producer Harvey Weinstein is charged with four additional counts of rape and sexual battery in a Los Angeles court.
- January 8
  - The American Cancer Society reports a 2.2% drop in the cancer death rate between 2016 and 2017, the largest single-year decline in mortality for this disease ever recorded in the U.S.
- January 10
  - For the first time since the Great Recession, women outnumber men in the American workforce, with women holding 50.04% of all jobs.
- January 14
  - The seventh Democratic presidential debate is held in Des Moines, Iowa, with six candidates participating.
  - The Women's National Basketball Association and its players' union reach an eight-year agreement allowing top players to earn $500,000 with an average salary of $130,000. It also provides fully paid maternity leave.
  - En route to Shanghai, Delta Air Lines Flight 89 dumps fuel on a school playground near Los Angeles International Airport. 60 people, including 17 children, are treated for skin irritation.
- January 15 – President Donald Trump and China's Vice Premier Liu He sign the U.S.–China Phase One trade deal in Washington, D.C.
- January 16 – The impeachment trial of President Donald Trump begins in the U.S. Senate.
- January 20 – 22,000 people attend a gun rights rally at the Virginia State Capitol in Richmond to protest proposed gun laws.
- January 21 – COVID-19 pandemic: The first case of COVID-19 in the United States is confirmed by the Centers for Disease Control and Prevention (CDC).
- January 22 – The Oakland Raiders officially relocate to Las Vegas, Nevada.
- January 24 – Donald Trump becomes the first sitting president to personally attend the annual March for Life anti-abortion protest in Washington, D.C.
- January 26
  - A helicopter crash in Calabasas, California, kills nine people, including basketball star Kobe Bryant and his 13-year-old daughter Gianna Bryant.
  - The 62nd Annual Grammy Awards are held in Los Angeles, California, hosted by Alicia Keys.
- January 28
  - Fotis Dulos attempts suicide at his home in Connecticut and is airlifted to a Bronx hospital where he dies 2 days later.
- January 29
  - COVID-19 pandemic: President Donald Trump establishes the White House Coronavirus Task Force.
  - President Trump signs the United States–Mexico–Canada Agreement (USMCA).
- January 30 – COVID-19 pandemic: The CDC confirms the first case of human-to-human transmission of the COVID-19 coronavirus in the U.S.
- January 31
  - COVID-19 pandemic: President Donald Trump imposes travel restrictions preventing foreign nationals from entering the U.S. if they visited China within the previous two weeks.
  - The U.S. Senate votes 51–49 against calling witnesses in President Trump's impeachment trial.
  - Travel ban restricting certain visas, particularly immigration, is expanded to include six new countries: Eritrea, Kyrgyzstan, Myanmar, Nigeria, Sudan, and Tanzania. Tourist visas are still allowed.
  - President Trump signs an executive order creating a new White House position dedicated to addressing Human trafficking in the United States at a White House summit on the issue.

=== February ===
- February 2 – Super Bowl LIV: The Kansas City Chiefs defeat the San Francisco 49ers, 31–20. Jennifer Lopez and Shakira co-headline the halftime show.
- February 3 – The 2020 Iowa Democratic and Republican caucuses take place. The Democratic caucus results are delayed due to problems with a vote-counting app.
- February 4 – President Donald Trump delivers his third State of the Union address. Among the guests are Venezuelan opposition leader Juan Guaidó and conservative radio host Rush Limbaugh, who is awarded the Presidential Medal of Freedom.
- February 5 – The impeachment trial of President Donald Trump concludes with the Senate voting 52–48 to acquit on the first article of impeachment and 53–47 on the second charge. Utah Senator Mitt Romney becomes the first ever senator to vote to remove a president of their own political party.
- February 6 – The National Highway Traffic Safety Administration (NHTSA) gives permission for Nuro Inc. to deploy up to 5,000 driverless delivery vehicles across the country. It is the first time the NHTSA allows deployment of automated driving systems without meeting all national auto safety standards.
- February 9 – The 92nd Academy Awards, the second in a row with no official host, are held at Dolby Theatre in Hollywood. Bong Joon-ho's Parasite becomes the first South Korean film to receive Academy Award recognition, winning four awards as well as becoming the first non-English-language film to win Best Picture; Joon-ho also wins Best Director. Todd Phillips' Joker leads the nominations with 11, with Joaquin Phoenix winning Best Actor. Renée Zellweger wins Best Actress for Judy, Brad Pitt Best Supporting Actor for Once Upon a Time in Hollywood and Laura Dern Best Supporting Actress for Marriage Story. The telecast garners over 23.6 million viewers, a 20% decrease from the previous year, at that point the lowest viewership for the ceremony since Nielsen began compiling figures.
- February 10 – Former Congressman J. C. Watts launches the first all-news channel aimed at African Americans, the Black News Channel.
- February 11 – The 2020 New Hampshire primaries are held.
- February 13 – The McClatchy newspaper chain files for Chapter 11 bankruptcy.
- February 17
  - COVID-19 pandemic: More than 300 Americans are evacuated from the quarantined Diamond Princess cruise ship in Japan, including 14 who have tested positive for the COVID-19 coronavirus.
  - The national Boy Scouts of America files for Chapter 11 bankruptcy, however independently funded local councils are not effected.
  - Pier 1 Imports files for Chapter 11 bankruptcy and plans to do so in Canada as well.
- February 19 – The Utah Senate votes to decriminalize polygamy.
- February 20 – Political consultant Roger Stone is sentenced to 40 months in prison after being found guilty of witness tampering, obstructing an official proceeding, and five counts of making false statements.
- February 21
  - Wells Fargo agrees to pay a $3 billion fine as a result of the 2016 fake account scandal.
- February 22 – The 2020 Nevada Democratic presidential caucuses are held. The Republican caucuses are cancelled with President Trump winning all delegates by default.
- February 23 – Ahmaud Arbery is murdered in Glynn County, Georgia. No arrests are made until May.
- February 24 – Former film producer Harvey Weinstein is found guilty of rape.
- February 25
  - Amazon opens its first cashierless grocery store, located in Seattle.
- February 27
  - COVID-19 pandemic: Growing fear of the COVID-19 coronavirus pandemic causes the Dow Jones Industrial Average to plunge by 1,190.95 points (4.4%), closing at 25,766.64—its largest one-day points decline in history. This follows several days of large falls, the Dow's worst week since 2008.
  - Marine commandant General David H. Berger orders the removal of Confederate symbols from Marine Corps bases around the world.
- February 29
  - The Trump administration and the Taliban sign a conditional peace agreement in Doha, Qatar as part of a process to end the war in Afghanistan.
  - COVID-19 pandemic: The first death from COVID-19 in the U.S. is reported by officials in Washington state, as the total number of cases nationwide reaches 66.
  - The 2020 South Carolina Democratic presidential primary is held; billionaire candidate Tom Steyer suspends his presidential campaign.

=== March ===
- March 1 – Former South Bend, Indiana mayor Pete Buttigieg suspends his presidential campaign.
- March 2
  - A tornado outbreak strikes four counties around Nashville, Tennessee, killing 26 people.
  - Senator Amy Klobuchar suspends her presidential campaign.
  - MSNBC commentator Chris Matthews announces his retirement.
- March 3 – Super Tuesday 2020 takes place.
- March 3–10 – The 2020 Democrats Abroad presidential primary takes place.
- March 4
  - COVID-19 pandemic: California governor Gavin Newsom declares a state of emergency.
  - Former New York City mayor Michael Bloomberg suspends his presidential campaign.
- March 5
  - COVID-19 pandemic: The Senate approves an $8.3 billion federal emergency aid package in response to the COVID-19 coronavirus pandemic. President Trump signs the bill into law the next day.
  - The Arizona House of Representatives passes a bill banning transgender females from sports.
  - Senator Elizabeth Warren suspends her presidential campaign.
- March 6
  - COVID-19 pandemic:
    - Florida reports two deaths from COVID-19, the first confirmed U.S. fatalities outside of the west coast.
    - The annual South by Southwest (SXSW) festival is canceled due to COVID-19 fears, the first time the event has been canceled in its 34-year history.
- March 9
  - Black Monday 2020: Share prices fall sharply in response to economic concerns and the impact of COVID-19. The Dow Jones industrial average plunges more than 2,000 points, its biggest ever fall in intraday trading. Oil prices plunge by as much as 30% in early trading, the biggest fall since 1991, after Saudi Arabia launches a price war with Russia.
- March 11
  - COVID-19 pandemic:
    - President Trump announces a 30-day ban on incoming travel from Europe, except the United Kingdom, effective on March 13. The travel ban is extended to the UK and Ireland on March 16.
    - The National Basketball Association suspends its season after Utah Jazz center Rudy Gobert tests positive for the virus, becoming the first major professional sports league to do so.
  - The Justice Department and the Drug Enforcement Administration announce the arrest of more than 600 alleged members of the Jalisco New Generation Cartel.
  - Former film producer Harvey Weinstein is sentenced to 23 years in prison for rape and sexual assault.
- March 12
  - COVID-19 pandemic:
    - The Metropolitan Opera, Carnegie Hall, and the New York Philharmonic announce temporary shutdowns in response to the COVID-19 pandemic. New York Governor Andrew Cuomo subsequently announces restrictions on gatherings of 500 people or more, forcing all Broadway theatres to close.
    - The National Hockey League and Major League Soccer also suspend their seasons following the NBA suspension the night before. Major League Baseball suspends spring training.
    - The NCAA cancels all Winter and Spring championships, including its men's and women's basketball tournaments, marking the first time both tournaments have been cancelled.
  - Black Thursday 2020: Following a series of recent major falls, the Dow Jones plunges yet again, this time by over 9.5%.
  - Federal judge Anthony Trenga orders whistleblower Chelsea Manning be released from prison, but must pay accrued fines of $256,000.

Confirmed COVID-19 cases per million inhabitants

- March 13
  - COVID-19 pandemic:
    - President Trump declares a national emergency in response to the COVID-19 pandemic, freeing up $50 billion in disaster relief funds.
    - The Food and Drug Administration (FDA) grants emergency authorization for a coronavirus test by Swiss diagnostics maker Roche.
  - Bill Gates steps down from the board of Microsoft to focus on philanthropic activities.
  - Breonna Taylor, a 26-year-old emergency medical technician, is shot eight times by Louisville police during a no-knock warrant as part of a narcotics investigation.
- March 15 – COVID-19 pandemic: The Federal Reserve announces that it will cut its target interest rate to 0-0.25 percent.
- March 16
  - COVID-19 pandemic:
    - Most schools nationwide are closed by this date.
    - The Dow Jones falls by 2,997.10, the single largest point drop in history and the second largest percentage drop ever at −12.93%, a larger crash than the Wall Street Crash of 1929.
    - The first Phase 1 clinical trial evaluating a potential COVID-19 vaccine begins at Kaiser Permanente Washington Health Research Institute in Seattle.
    - The 2020 Kentucky Derby is postponed until September 5, the first postponement since 1945.
- March 17
  - COVID-19 pandemic: West Virginia becomes the 50th state to have a confirmed a case of COVID-19.
- March 18
  - COVID-19 pandemic:
    - President Trump signs the Families First Coronavirus Response Act into law and announces he will invoke the Defense Production Act to improve U.S. medical resources and that he directed the Housing and Urban Development Department (HUD) to suspend evictions and foreclosures of federal housing until the end of April. He also announces the temporary closure of the Canada–United States border; cross-border trade will continue.
    - The Dow Jones closes down 6 percent, falling below 20,000 points.
  - A 5.9M_{w} earthquake hits Salt Lake City, Utah.
  - Representative Tulsi Gabbard suspends her presidential campaign.
- March 19 – COVID-19 pandemic: The Department of Labor reports that 281,000 Americans filed for unemployment in the last week, a 33 percent increase over the prior week and the biggest percentage increase since 1992.
- March 20 – COVID-19 pandemic: New York governor Cuomo orders staff at all "non-essential" businesses to remain at home.
- March 21 – COVID-19 pandemic: Biotech company Cepheid Inc reports that it has been granted FDA approval for a new rapid diagnostic test, able to detect COVID-19 in 45 minutes.
- March 22
  - COVID-19 pandemic:
    - President Trump says the National Guard has been activated in California, Washington, and New York, thus far the states most impacted by the outbreak. The Washington National Guard clarifies that it was yet to be "activated", only put on stand-by.
    - The USNS Comfort (T-AH-20) hospital ship is announced to be deployed to New York. The USNS Mercy (T-AH-19) is to be deployed to Los Angeles.
    - Rand Paul (R-KY) is the first senator to test positive for COVID-19.
- March 23 – Colorado becomes the 22nd state to abolish the death penalty.
- March 24
  - COVID-19 pandemic:
    - The Dow Jones jumps by over 2,100 points, or 11.3 percent—its biggest one-day percentage gain since 1933.
    - The U.S. box office records zero revenue for the first time ever.
    - Nevada governor Steve Sisolak bans the use of anti-malaria drugs for COVID-19 treatment, notably chloroquine and hydroxychloroquine.
    - FBI agents kill a man in Belton, Missouri suspected of plotting a bombing attack at a Kansas City hospital believed to be treating COVID-19 patients.
  - A Gallup poll places President Trump's approval rating at 49 percent, his highest thus far. A separate Hill-HarrisX poll places him at 50 percent, his highest since August 2018.
- March 25
  - COVID-19 pandemic:
    - Nationwide COVID-19 deaths surpass 1,000 as the total number of cases reach almost 69,000.
    - The White House and the Senate agree to a $2 trillion stimulus package—the largest in U.S. history—to boost the economy amid the ongoing pandemic. The Senate subsequently approves the negotiated bill (the CARES Act) in a 96–0 vote. Trump signs the bill into law on March 27 after a House voice vote.
    - The Pentagon orders a 60-day halt on all overseas troop travel and movement as 227 U.S. troops have thus far tested positive for COVID-19. The withdrawal from Afghanistan will continue.
- March 26
  - COVID-19 pandemic:
    - Nationwide COVID-19 infections exceed 82,000—surpassing infections in China and Italy—as the U.S. now has more cases reported than any other country to date.
    - The Department of Labor reports that 3.28 million Americans filed for unemployment benefits in the last week, the largest increase in U.S. history. It supersedes the all-time high of 695,000 in October 1982.
  - The Trump administration indicts Venezuelan president Nicolás Maduro's government of drug trafficking and narcoterrorism and offers a $15 million reward for information leading to Maduro's arrest.
  - The Space Force launches its first satellite, a $1.4 billion Advanced Extremely High Frequency (AEHF-6) military communications satellite.
- March 27 – President Trump signs the CARES Act in response to the COVID-19 pandemic.
- March 31
  - COVID-19 pandemic:
    - Three-quarters of the U.S. population are under lockdown restrictions as Maryland, Virginia, Arizona and Tennessee become the latest states to restrict movement.
    - U.S. dairy producers dump thousands of gallons of milk due to economic restrictions in response to the coronavirus outbreak.
  - The Federal Communications Commission mandates cell phone providers implement STIR/SHAKEN by June 30, 2021, for large carriers and June 30, 2022, for small carriers to prevent robocalls maliciously using caller ID spoofing to avoid being traced.
  - A 6.5M_{w} earthquake strikes Central Idaho.

=== April ===
- April 1
  - The Trump administration deploys anti-drug Navy ships and AWACS planes near Venezuela in reportedly the largest military build-up in the region since the 1989 invasion of Panama.
- April 3 – COVID-19 pandemic: The CDC recommends all citizens consider wearing cloth or fabric face coverings in public.
- April 6
  - COVID-19 pandemic: Nationwide COVID-19 deaths surpass 10,000, with more than 19,800 recoveries.
  - President Trump signs an executive order encouraging future long-term commercial exploitation of various celestial bodies and mining of lunar resources.
- April 8
  - Senator Bernie Sanders suspends his presidential campaign, leaving Joe Biden as the presumptive Democratic nominee.
  - COVID-19 pandemic:
    - Over 100 inmates at Monroe Correctional Complex in Monroe, Washington riot after six inmates test positive for COVID-19.
    - The Broadway League extends the Broadway theatre shutdown through June 7, which would lead to the longest shutdown in Broadway history.
- April 11
  - COVID-19 pandemic:
    - Farmers are forced to dump nearly four million gallons of milk per day and 750,000 eggs per week due to economic restrictions in response to the coronavirus outbreak.
    - The U.S. becomes the country with the highest number of reported COVID-19 deaths: over 20,000, overtaking Italy.
    - For the first time in U.S. history, all 50 states have simultaneous federal major disaster declarations after Wyoming receives the final declaration. Washington, D.C., the U.S. Virgin Islands, the Northern Mariana Islands, Guam and Puerto Rico also have major disaster declarations by this time.
- April 12 – At least 30 people are killed and 1.3 million left without electricity after an Easter tornado outbreak across the South.
- April 14 – COVID-19 pandemic: President Trump announces that he will suspend U.S. funding of the World Health Organization (WHO) pending an investigation into its early response to the outbreak.
- April 15
  - COVID-19 pandemic:
    - Michigan Governor Gretchen Whitmer faces two federal lawsuits accusing her of violating constitutional rights during the state's restrictions. Thousands of people attend a protest in Lansing as anti-lockdown sentiment spreads.
    - New York Governor Andrew Cuomo signs an executive order requiring everyone in the state to wear a mask or a mouth/nose covering in public when not social distancing.
- April 16
  - COVID-19 pandemic:
    - Nearly 22 million Americans have filed for unemployment within a single month due to COVID-19 lockdowns, the worst unemployment crisis since the Great Depression.
    - The Trump administration releases federal guidelines outlining a three-phased, gradual reopening of schools, commerce, and services for parts of the country.
- April 17 – COVID-19 pandemic: Texas is the first state to begin easing coronavirus-related restrictions. Florida's Duval County is the first in the state to ease restrictions, with Jacksonville, Atlantic, and Neptune being the first beaches in the state to reopen, on a limited basis.
- April 21
  - COVID-19 pandemic: The state of Missouri challenges China's sovereign immunity in U.S. district court by suing three Chinese government ministries, two local governments, two laboratories and the Chinese Communist Party over its handling of the COVID-19 outbreak.
- April 22 – COVID-19 pandemic: President Trump signs an immigration executive order halting the issuance of certain green cards for 60 days.
- April 24
  - COVID-19 pandemic: President Trump signs a $483 billion bill to rescue small businesses.
- April 27
  - COVID-19 pandemic: Nationwide confirmed COVID-19 cases surpass 1 million.
  - The Pentagon officially releases three short videos showing "unidentified aerial phenomena".
- April 29 – The Department of Commerce reports that the U.S. economy shrank by 4.8% in the first quarter of 2020, its most severe contraction since 2008.
- April 30
  - COVID-19 pandemic: Armed protesters enter Michigan's State Capitol building to demand an end to lockdown measures.
  - NASA selects three U.S. companies—Blue Origin, Dynetics, and SpaceX—to design and develop human landing systems for the agency's Artemis program, one of which is planned to deliver the first woman and next man on the Moon in 2028.

=== May ===
- May 1 – COVID-19 pandemic: The FDA authorizes emergency remdesivir use to treat the sickest COVID-19 patients.
- May 2 – 2020 Kansas Democratic primary: Joe Biden wins in a mail-in primary with ranked choice voting.
- May 3 – The United States faces an invasion of Asian giant hornets, likely brought by international shipping, which threatens domestic bees.
- May 7 – The Department of Justice drops charges against former National Security Advisor Michael Flynn in the Mueller investigation.
- May 8 – COVID-19 pandemic: The national unemployment level reaches 14.7%, with more than 33 million jobless claims having been filed since mid-March.
- May 11 – Nearly 2,000 former Justice Department officials sign a letter calling for Attorney General William Barr to resign over what they describe as his improper intervention in the Flynn case.
- May 12 – COVID-19 pandemic: The Broadway League extends its shutdown of Broadway theatres for a second time, projecting reopening on September 6.
- May 15
  - COVID-19 pandemic: The Trump administration formally announces Operation Warp Speed, a public–private partnership for accelerating the development of a COVID-19 vaccine.
  - A 6.4M_{w} earthquake strikes Nevada.
- May 16
  - Tropical Storm Arthur is the first storm of the 2020 Atlantic hurricane season.
- May 18 – The FBI confirms that the 2019 Naval Air Station Pensacola shooting was the first terrorist attack on U.S. territory that had been directed by a foreign actor since 9/11.
- May 19
  - COVID-19 pandemic: The Congressional Budget Office reports a 38% fall in GDP on an annualized basis in the second quarter of 2020, with 26 million more unemployed Americans than in Q4 2019.
- May 25 – Minneapolis police officer Derek Chauvin murders George Floyd, 46, by kneeling on his neck, as three other officers watch.
- May 26
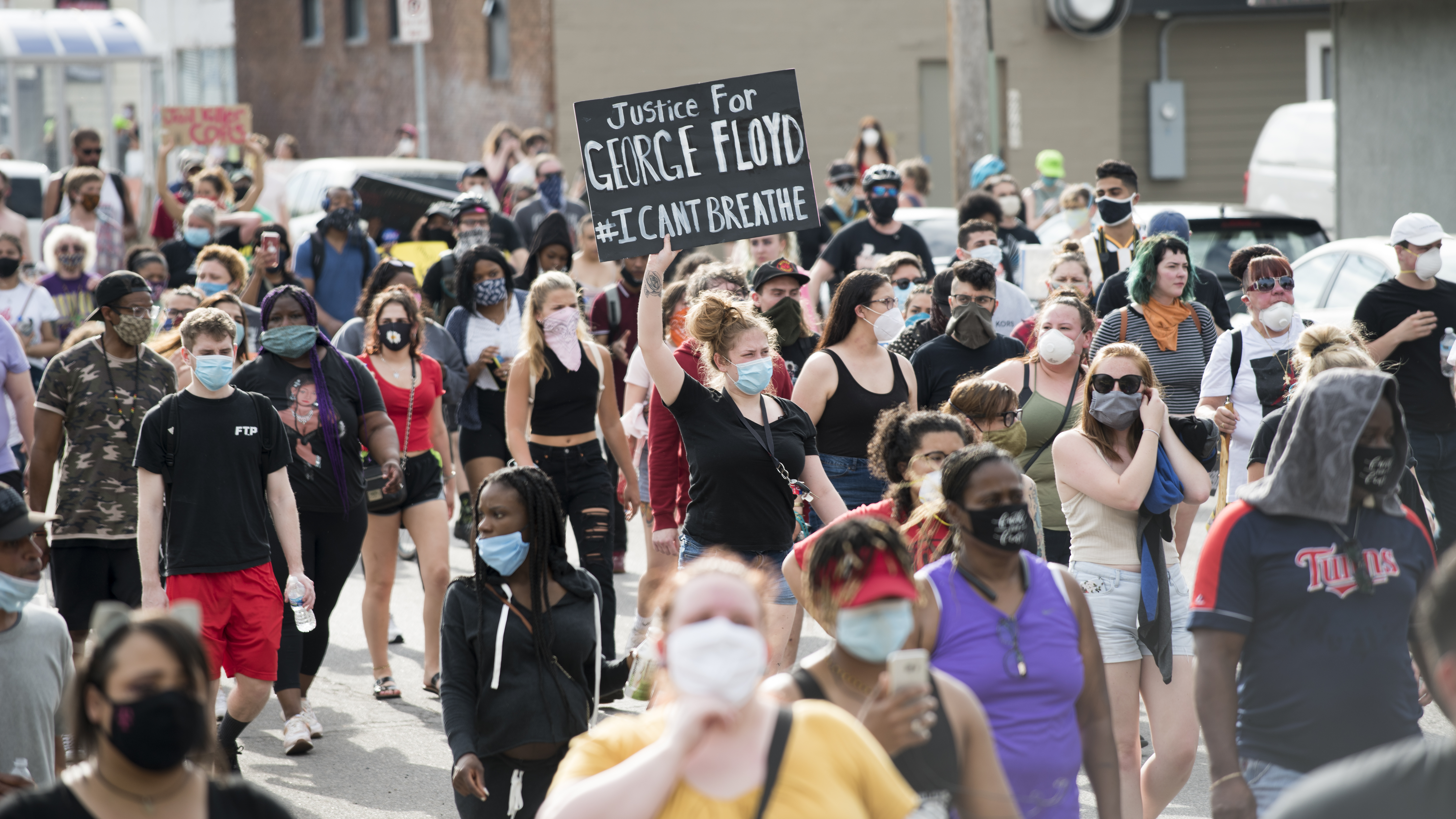
  May 26: George Floyd protests in Minneapolis–Saint Paul begin.
  - George Floyd:
    - Video of the incident goes viral and the four officers are fired.
    - Major protests begin in the Minneapolis–Saint Paul area following the murder of George Floyd.
  - For the first time, Twitter labels a tweet by President Trump "misleading" and includes a "fact check" link.
- May 27
  - COVID-19 pandemic: The official nationwide death toll surpasses 100,000.
  - George Floyd protests: Protests in Minneapolis turn violent as activists call for murder charges against the police officers involved in George Floyd's murder.
  - President Trump threatens to shut down Twitter and other social media platforms, accusing them of bias against conservatives.
- May 28
  - George Floyd protests: A state of emergency is declared in the Twin Cities, with hundreds of National Guard soldiers deployed on the streets as protests spread nationwide.
  - President Trump signs an executive order rolling back liability protections for social media companies over user-generated content.
- May 29
  - George Floyd protests:
    - Minneapolis officer Derek Chauvin is charged with third-degree murder and manslaughter in the killing of George Floyd. An independent autopsy concludes on June 1 that Floyd's cause of death was "homicide caused by asphyxia", with arteriosclerotic and hypertensive heart disease, as well as the presence of fentanyl and methamphetamine also noted. Minnesota Attorney General Keith Ellison later increases the charge against Derek Chauvin to second degree on June 3; charges against the three other officers who were present are also filed.
    - That night, hundreds of George Floyd protesters breached the White House security perimeter. President Trump was temporarily moved into an underground bunker for his protection. Sometime later, in the early hours of May 30, police deployed chemical irritants against the protesters, with the Washington Post reporting "gasses and sprays" were used to disperse the crowds. The confrontation was said to last more than 10 hours in total.
- May 30
  - The first crewed flight of the SpaceX Dragon 2 is launched from Cape Canaveral, Florida, the first crewed spacecraft to launch from U.S. soil since 2011.
  - George Floyd protests: Curfews are declared in Los Angeles, Philadelphia and Atlanta as riots and protests continue nationwide. The weeks' rioting is termed the worst instance of civil unrest in the United States since the 1968 King assassination riots.
- May 31 – In response to the wave of civil unrest across the country, President Trump says he will designate the far-left activist group Antifa a terrorist organization.

=== June ===
- June 1 – Trump threatens to deploy the military to quell the George Floyd riots and conducts a photo-op with a bible at St. John's Episcopal Church. Tear gas was deployed to remove protestors from the area. Religious leaders roundly condemned the Trump admin for attacking the protestors.
- June 2 – Blackout Tuesday, an industry-driven collective protest against racism and police brutality inspired by the George Floyd protests, is observed.
- June 8
  - Rioters and protestors declare an autonomous zone amid unrest in Seattle's Capitol Hill.
- June 9 – Air Force General Charles Brown becomes the first African American to lead a branch of U.S. Armed Forces and the first African American Air Force Chief of Staff.
- June 11 – The Trump administration authorizes sanctions and additional visa restrictions against the International Criminal Court in retaliation for their investigation into potential war crimes by U.S. officials.
- June 12
  - The Minneapolis City Council votes unanimously to disband the Minneapolis Police Department and replace it with a "community" safety department, however it is prevented from doing so by the city charter.
  - Protests breakout in Atlanta following the killing of Rayshard Brooks by a police officer in the parking lot of a fast food restaurant.
- June 13 – Atlanta Chief of Police Erika Shields resigns and protesters burn down the fast food restaurant where the incident took place.
- June 15
  - The Supreme Court rules that Title VII of the Civil Rights Act of 1964, which makes it illegal for employers to discriminate because of a person's sex, also covers sexual orientation.
  - COVID-19 pandemic: The FDA withdraws emergency use authorization for hydroxychloroquine to treat hospitalized COVID-19 patients, citing unnecessary risk.
- June 18 – The Environmental Protection Agency (EPA) withdraws the introduction of federal limits for perchlorate, which has been linked to brain damage in infants.
- June 20 – President Trump holds his first 2020 campaign rally in months at the Bank of Oklahoma Center in Tulsa, Oklahoma.
- June 26
  - President Trump signs an executive order against the destruction or vandalism of public monuments, memorials, or statues.
- June 29 – COVID-19 pandemic: Arizona Governor Doug Ducey orders all bars, nightclubs, gyms, movie theaters and water parks to close for 30 days, due to a spike in COVID-19 cases.
- June 30 – Following a vote by the state legislature, Mississippi governor Tate Reeves signs a bill retiring the official Mississippi state flag, the last state flag incorporating the Confederate Battle Flag of the Army of Northern Virginia into its design. A commission is established to design a new state flag.

=== July ===
- July 1 – The House Armed Services Committee votes for a National Defense Authorization Act amendment to restrict President Trump's ongoing troop withdrawal from Afghanistan and prospective withdrawal from Germany.
- July 2
  - The FBI arrests British socialite Ghislaine Maxwell, an associate of late convicted sex offender Jeffrey Epstein, in New Hampshire.
- July 4
  - Rapper Kanye West announces his candidacy in the 2020 presidential election.
  - The 2020 Salute to America Independence Day event is held in Washington, D.C.
- July 8
  - The Supreme Court rules that President Trump must release his financial records for examination by prosecutors in New York.
- July 10 – President Trump commutes the 40-month sentence of political consultant Roger Stone.
- July 11 – COVID-19 pandemic: President Trump is seen publicly wearing a face mask for the first time while visiting wounded soldiers and health care workers at Walter Reed Military Hospital.
- July 14
  - White supremacist and murderer Daniel Lewis Lee is executed by lethal injection in Terre Haute, Indiana, becoming the first federal execution since 2003.
  - COVID-19 pandemic: Pharmaceutical company Moderna announces that its vaccine will begin the final phase of testing, with approximately 30,000 human volunteers.
- July 15
  - The Twitter accounts of prominent political figures, CEOs, and celebrities are hacked to promote a bitcoin scam.
  - COVID-19 pandemic: Georgia Governor Brian Kemp ends all of the state's local face mask mandates.
- July 17 – Secretary of Defense Mark Esper issues a memorandum to the military on the appropriate display of flags, which excludes the Confederate flag, effectively banning it.
- July 21 – Ohio House Speaker Larry Householder (R) is arrested by federal agents in connection with a $60 million bribery case. Former Ohio GOP Chairman Matt Borges is also arrested, along with a GOP advisor and two lobbyists.
- July 22 – George Floyd protests: President Trump announces a "surge" of federal officers to cities, following an earlier crackdown on protests in Oregon.
- July 23 – The Trump administration announces that it is revoking the Affirmatively Furthering Fair Housing provision of the 1968 Fair Housing Act.
- July 25 – Hurricane Hanna makes two landfalls in South Texas, one in Padre Island and another in Kenedy County, killing 5 people.
- July 29 – George Floyd protests: Oregon Governor Kate Brown and Vice President Mike Pence agree to a phased withdrawal of deployed federal law enforcement from Portland.
- July 30
  - Federal economic figures show a 32.9% annualized rate of GDP contraction between April and June, the sharpest decline since records began in 1945.
  - President Trump suggests delaying the 2020 presidential election, saying increased voting by mail could lead to fraud and inaccurate results.

=== August ===
- August 2 – Crew Dragon Demo-2, the first U.S.-crewed splashdown since 1975, lands in the Gulf of Mexico.
- August 3
  - Hurricane Isaias makes landfall in North Carolina.
  - Thousands of Los Angeles residents are evacuated due to the Apple Fire.
- August 4 – The Great American Outdoors Act is passed, improving conservation and maintenance of national parks.
- August 5 – Secretary of Health and Human Services Alex Azar travels to Taiwan, the highest U.S. official visit to the country in 40 years.
- August 6
  - New York Attorney General Letitia James announces a lawsuit aimed at dissolving the National Rifle Association of America over alleged financial mismanagement.
  - President Trump signs an executive order banning any U.S. companies or citizens from making transactions with ByteDance, the parent company of TikTok, in 45 days. He takes similar action against Tencent.
  - Facebook founder Mark Zuckerberg reaches a net worth exceeding $100 billion, becoming the third centibillionaire, alongside Jeff Bezos and Bill Gates.
- August 7 – COVID-19 pandemic: The Sturgis Motorcycle Rally begins despite concerns by health officials.
- August 9 – President Trump is escorted from a news briefing by the Secret Service following a shooting near the White House.
- August 11 – Democratic presidential candidate Joe Biden names Senator Kamala Harris as his vice presidential nominee, the first African-American and South Asian American woman to serve in the role.
- August 13
  - The 2020 Postal Service crisis begins after plans are revealed to remove hundreds of high-volume mail sorting machines from postal facilities across the country.
  - The Pentagon reportedly begins establishing a new task force to investigate UFO sightings, particularly over military bases, similar to the U.S. Navy's Unidentified Aerial Phenomena Task Force.
- August 16 – During a record-breaking heat wave, a remnant thunderstorm from Tropical Storm Fausto spawns hundreds of wildfires in California.
- August 17 – The Democratic National Convention is begins in Milwaukee, Wisconsin, with events happening virtually. Delegates of the Democratic Party formally choose former Vice President Joe Biden and Senator Kamala Harris of California as the party's respective nominees for president and vice president for the 2020 election.
- August 19 – Apple Inc. becomes the first U.S. company to be valued at over $2 trillion.
- August 20
  - Former White House advisor Steve Bannon is arrested and charged with fraud over a fundraising campaign to build a wall on the U.S.-Mexico border. He is released on a $5 million bail bond after pleading not guilty.
- August 23
  - Violent protests break out in Kenosha, Wisconsin following the shooting of Jacob Blake, by a police officer.
  - COVID-19 pandemic: The FDA grants emergency use authorization to antibody-rich blood plasma for the treatment of COVID-19 in hospitalized patients.
- August 24 – The Republican National Convention begins in Charlotte, North Carolina and Washington, D.C. Delegates of the Republican Party formally nominate incumbent President Donald Trump and Vice President Mike Pence as the party's nominees for the 2020 election.
- August 26 – Riots break out in downtown Minneapolis following false rumors about the suicide of an African-American man being pursued by police.
- August 26
  - Kenosha protests:
    - Two people are fatally shot overnight during unrest in Kenosha, Wisconsin; a suspect is arrested.
    - Professional athletes begin boycotting their respective sports contests in response to the shooting of Jacob Blake.
  - Amazon CEO Jeff Bezos becomes the first person in history to have a net worth exceeding $200 billion, according to Forbes.
- August 28 – Thousands of people gather at the Lincoln Memorial in Washington, D.C. for the Commitment March in support of black civil rights.

=== September ===
- September 2 – Protests breakout in Rochester, New York following the release of police body camera footage of the fatal March 2020 arrest of Daniel Prude.
- September 4 – A Trump administration memo calls on all executive branch agencies to cease funding for diversity and sensitivity training and teachings of critical race theory.
- September 5 – Authentic wins the 2020 Kentucky Derby.
- September 6 – California sets a new record for land area destroyed by wildfires, with 2.1 million acres burned in the year thus far.
- September 9 – President Donald Trump is nominated for the 2021 Nobel Peace Prize by a Norwegian lawmaker for his role in facilitating the Israel–United Arab Emirates normalization agreement.
- September 10 – Over 10 percent of Oregon's state population are reported to be fleeing wildfires.
- September 12 – Two Los Angeles County Sheriff's Department deputies are shot and critically injured while sitting in their patrol car in Compton, California.
- September 16 – Hurricane Sally brings massive flooding to the South after making landfall, killing eight people and costing billions in damage.
- September 18 – Supreme Court Justice Ruth Bader Ginsburg dies, creating a vacancy in the court, which President Trump says he will fill with a woman.
- September 19 – Law enforcement officials report the interception of a package, addressed to President Trump, containing the lethal toxin ricin.
- September 21 – Microsoft agrees to buy ZeniMax Media holding company and its subsidiaries for $7.5 billion, the largest and most expensive takeover in the history of the video game industry.
- September 25 – President Trump unveils his "Platinum Plan" at a campaign rally in Atlanta, in which he proposes making Juneteenth a federal holiday, labeling the Ku Klux Klan and Antifa as terrorist organizations, and making lynching a national hate crime, among other socioeconomic initiatives aimed at African Americans.
- September 26 – President Trump nominates Seventh Circuit Court of Appeals Judge Amy Coney Barrett to fill the vacant Supreme Court seat following the death of Justice Ruth Bader Ginsburg.
- September 27 – A New York Times report on President Trump's personal and business tax returns alleges years of tax avoidance and millions in debt and IRS penalties, among other allegations.
- September 28 – The Tampa Bay Lightning defeat the Dallas Stars 4–2 to win their second Stanley Cup championship.
- September 29 – The first 2020 presidential debate between President Donald Trump and former Vice President Joe Biden takes place in Cleveland, Ohio.

=== October ===
- October 1
  - COVID-19 pandemic: President Donald Trump and First Lady Melania Trump, along with several White House staffers and multiple members of Congress test positive for coronavirus during the White House COVID-19 outbreak.
  - The Trump administration announces plans to slash U.S. refugee admissions for 2021 to a record low–15,000 refugees, down from a cap of 18,000 for 2020.
- October 2 – President Trump is hospitalized at Walter Reed National Military Medical Center.
- October 5 – COVID-19 pandemic: President Trump returns to the White House after three days of hospitalization.
- October 7
  - Ruby Tuesday files for Chapter 11 bankruptcy protection after closing 185 restaurants. Pizza Hut files for Chapter 11 bankruptcy after closing 163 restaurants.
  - The 2020 vice presidential debate takes place in Salt Lake City.
- October 8 – The FBI charges 13 militiamen with plotting to kidnap Michigan Governor Gretchen Whitmer at her vacation home. A fourteenth suspect is arrested on October 15.
- October 9
  - Hurricane Delta makes landfall near Creole, Louisiana, the tenth landfalling storm in the 2020 season, a record breaking amount.
  - COVID-19 pandemic: The Broadway League extends its shutdown of Broadway theaters for a third time, until May 30, 2021.
- October 10 – COVID-19 pandemic: President Trump hosts his first public event at the White House since becoming ill, informing attendees that a vaccine is forthcoming.
- October 11 – The Los Angeles Lakers defeat the Miami Heat in the 2020 NBA Finals to win their 17th championship in franchise history.
- October 12
  - Facebook bans content relating to Holocaust denial.
  - Activists in Portland, Oregon, topple statues of former presidents Theodore Roosevelt and Abraham Lincoln in protest of the execution of 38 Dakota people in 1862 and Roosevelt's views on Native Americans.
- October 15 – President Trump and Joe Biden participate in dueling town halls. Biden's is hosted by ABC's George Stephanopoulos and Trump's is hosted by NBC's Savannah Guthrie.
- October 22 – The second 2020 presidential debate takes place in Nashville, Tennessee.
- October 26
  - The Senate confirms Amy Coney Barrett as Supreme Court justice with a party line vote of 52–48.
  - The Supreme Court rules 5-3 that Wisconsin cannot count mail-in ballots received after election day.
  - Walter Wallace Jr. is shot and killed by two Philadelphia police officers, resulting in subsequent protests and riots.
- October 27 – The Los Angeles Dodgers defeat the Tampa Bay Rays to win the 2020 World Series, their first in 32 years.
- October 28 – President Trump declares a state of emergency for Louisiana ahead of Hurricane Zeta's landfall.
- October 30 – Trump supporters are reported to have surrounded the Biden campaign bus in Texas.
- October 31 – COVID-19 pandemic: New York Governor Andrew Cuomo announces all out-of-state visitors must test negative for COVID-19 three days before arrival.

=== November ===
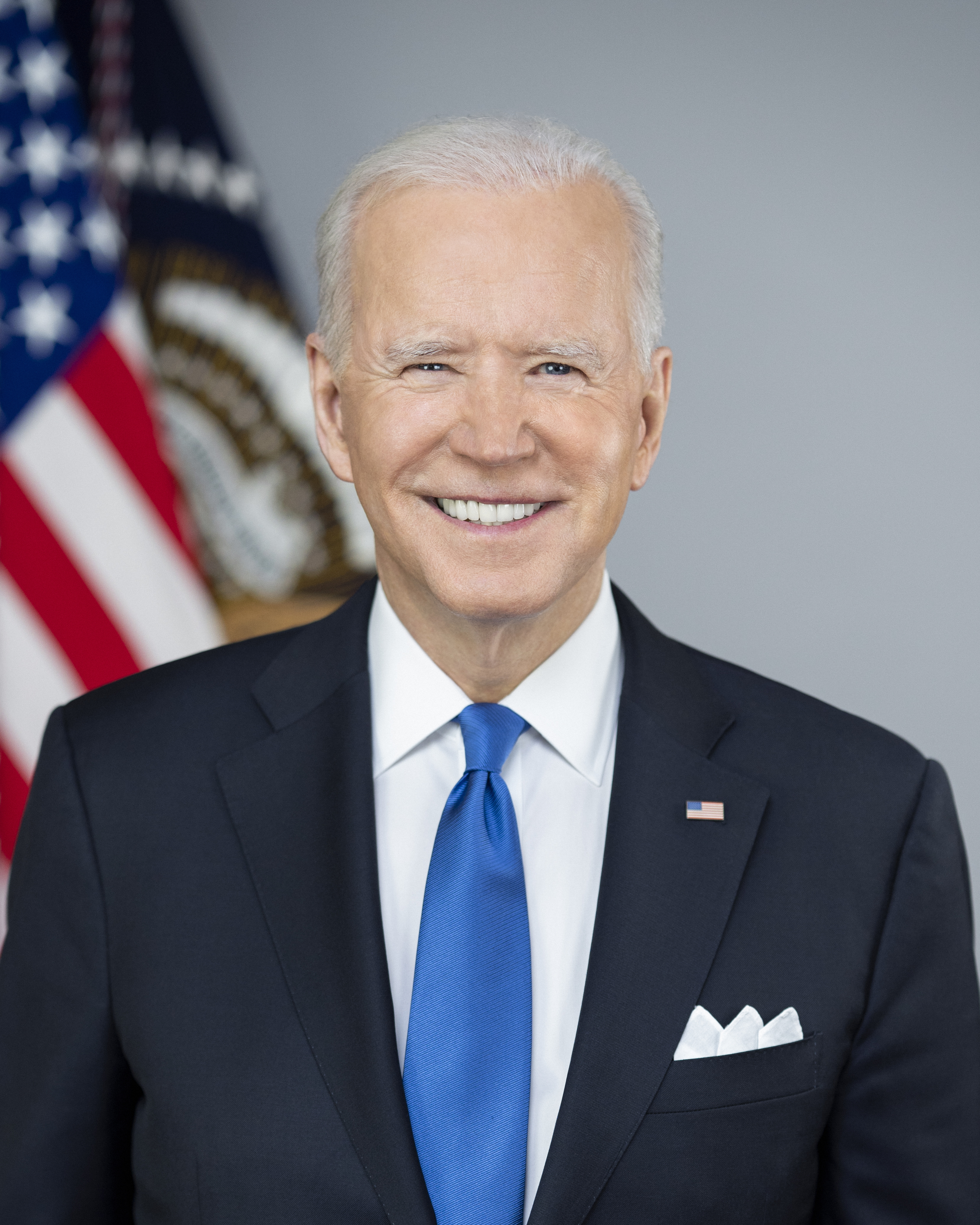
Joe Biden is elected the 46th president of the United States

- November 3
  - 2020 United States elections:
    - The 2020 United States presidential election takes place. Shortly after midnight, President Trump asserts that he has won the election and demands all vote counting to stop, alleging potential electoral fraud.
    - Oregon becomes the first state to decriminalize possession of small amounts of narcotics, including heroin, cocaine and LSD.
    - Voters in Arizona, Montana, New Jersey, and South Dakota vote to legalize recreational marijuana. Voters in Mississippi and South Dakota vote to legalize medical marijuana.
    - Mississippi approves a new state flag to replace the previous design that featured a Confederate battle flag, while voters in Rhode Island approve the removal of "...and Providence Plantations" from the state's official name.
- November 4 – The United States formally withdraws from the Paris Agreement.
- November 5
  - Former White House advisor Steve Bannon is permanently banned from Twitter after suggesting FBI Director Christopher Wray and NIAID Director Dr. Anthony Fauci be beheaded during a live broadcast.
  - 2020 presidential election: Facebook bans a 300,000-member Stop the Steal group page being used by supporters of President Trump to organize protests against the election results.
- November 7
  - 2020 presidential election:
    - Joe Biden is projected to have won the presidential election, following several days of uncertainty due to postal vote counting. It is the first time since 1992 that an incumbent president's challenger has won the election over the incumbent president, when Bill Clinton defeated George H. W. Bush.
    - Kamala Harris is the first woman and second person of color to be elected Vice President of the United States. Her husband, Doug Emhoff, is to become the first Second Gentleman and the first Jewish spouse of a U.S. vice president.
    - Rudy Giuliani, attorney for then-president Donald Trump, hosts a press conference at Four Seasons Total Landscaping. The event was considered a symbolic end to Trump's first presidency, according to several news outlets.
- November 9
  - 2020 presidential election: President Trump's re-election campaign files multiple lawsuits in several states alleging widespread electoral fraud.
  - Defense Secretary Mark Esper is dismissed from his position in a tweet by President Trump.
- November 10 – President Trump promotes a number of reported loyalists to various roles in the Defense Department.
- November 12
  - 2020 presidential election: A coalition of federal and state officials declare the 2020 presidential election "the most secure in American history" and asserts there is no evidence of compromised voting systems.
  - The FBI arrests convicted murderer Leonard Rayne Moses, who escaped from custody in 1971 and had been on the Ten Most Wanted Fugitives list.
- November 13
  - 2020 presidential election: President-elect Joe Biden is projected to win Arizona, the first Democrat to do so since Bill Clinton in 1996. Biden also becomes the first Democrat to win Georgia since Clinton did so in 1992.
  - COVID-19 pandemic – Oregon and North Dakota issue new mask mandates and restrictions on businesses.
- November 14 – 2020 presidential election: Thousands of protesters march in Washington, D.C. in support of President Trump and his claims of electoral voter fraud.
- November 15 – 2020 presidential election: President Trump concedes that Joe Biden won the presidential election, but alleges vote rigging.
- November 16 – SpaceX Crew-1, the first operational SpaceX crew dragon mission, launches from the Kennedy Space Center.
- November 17
  - COVID-19 pandemic:
    - Pennsylvania announces that out-of-state travelers will be required to either quarantine or present a negative COVID-19 test result to enter the state.
    - Ohio Governor Mike DeWine orders a three-week night time curfew from 10:00 pm until 5:00 am EST beginning November 19.
    - The FDA grants emergency use authorization to a home testing kit by Lucira Health, Inc. that provides COVID-19 results in 30 minutes.
- November 18
  - COVID-19 pandemic:
    - New York City Mayor Bill de Blasio orders public schools to conduct classes exclusively online.
    - Minnesota Governor Tim Walz imposes several new four-week restrictions on businesses and indoor gatherings beginning November 20.
  - The Federal Aviation Administration allows the Boeing 737 MAX to fly in the United States citing modifications following a 20-month ban.
- November 19
  - One-third of the nine-member Cincinnati City Council had been arrested on bribery charges by this date.
  - 2020 presidential election: Joe Biden's win in Georgia is upheld and reaffirmed following a hand recount, making him the first Democrat to win the state since Bill Clinton in 1992.
  - COVID-19 pandemic: California Governor Gavin Newsom orders a 10:00 p.m. to 5:00 a.m. PST curfew for 41 counties beginning November 21, affecting more than 90 percent of the state population.
- November 21
  - COVID-19 pandemic: The FDA grants emergency use authorization for Regeneron Pharmaceuticals' antibody cocktail to treat COVID-19 patients.
- November 22 – The United States withdraws from the Treaty on Open Skies.
- November 23
  - 2020 presidential election:
    - The presidential transition of President-elect Joe Biden formally begins.
    - Joe Biden announces several people he will nominate to his cabinet, including Avril Haines as the first female Director of National Intelligence, Alejandro Mayorkas as the first Hispanic Secretary of Homeland Security, and Janet Yellen as the first female Treasury Secretary.
- November 24 – The Dow Jones increases by 500 points to surpass 30,000 for the first time.
- November 28
  - Wilton Daniel Gregory becomes the first African American cardinal.
  - Mike Tyson returns to boxing in an exhibition bout against Roy Jones Jr..
- November 29
  - President-elect Biden nominates an all-female communications team, including Kate Bedingfield as Communications Director and Jen Psaki as Press Secretary.
- November 30 – Arizona becomes the 12th state to legalize recreational cannabis.

=== December ===
- December 1 – COVID-19 pandemic: Congress unveils a $908 billion COVID-19 relief plan.
- December 2 – Former astronaut Mark Kelly is sworn in as a U.S. Senator after a special election in Arizona.
- December 3
  - COVID-19 pandemic: President-elect Joe Biden announces that Dr. Vivek Murthy and Jeffrey Zients will lead his administration's response to the COVID-19 pandemic and asks Dr. Anthony Fauci to become the White House Coronavirus Task Force's chief medical advisor.
  - The Department of Justice files a lawsuit against Facebook, accusing them of discriminating against American workers.
  - The circuit court of Kenosha, Wisconsin orders 17-year old suspect Kyle Rittenhouse in the fatal Kenosha protest shooting to stand trial on two first-degree homicide charges, as well as possession of a firearm by a minor, and two counts of reckless endangerment.
- December 4 – The House of Representatives passes the MORE Act to decriminalize recreational cannabis at the federal level.
- December 6
  - President-elect Biden nominates California Attorney General Xavier Becerra to be the first Hispanic Health and Human Services Secretary.
- December 7
  - 2020 presidential election: Georgia re-certifies Joe Biden as the winner of the state following a second recount.
  - Joe Biden nominates retired Army General Lloyd Austin to be the first African American Secretary of Defense.
  - The National Football League announces an investigation into the Washington Football Team for allegations of workplace sexual harassment.
  - COVID-19 pandemic:
    - Michigan extends its statewide partial shutdown on businesses, indoor dining in restaurants, and in-person instruction at high schools and colleges through December 20.
    - Wyoming issues new restrictions, including a statewide mask mandate for indoor public spaces from December 9 to January 8.
- December 9
  - Vice President Mike Pence announces the 18 Artemis astronauts at the eighth meeting of the National Space Council.
  - COVID-19 pandemic: Alabama Governor Kay Ivey announces that the statewide mask mandate and stay-at-home order will be extended until January 22.
- December 11
  - 2020 presidential election: The Supreme Court denies a lawsuit to overturn Joe Biden's victory in four battleground states.
  - COVID-19 pandemic: The FDA grants emergency authorization of the Pfizer–BioNTech COVID-19 vaccine.
- December 12
  - Four people are stabbed, one is shot, and 33 are arrested during 2020–2021 United States election protests in Washington, D.C..
  - The MLS Cup 2020 hosted in Columbus, Ohio, Columbus Crew defeated Seattle Sounders FC with the score 3–0 and win their second MLS Cup championship.
- December 13 – The Pfizer-BioNTech vaccine begins shipment to all 50 states.
- December 14
  - COVID-19 pandemic:
    - The first doses of the Pfizer-BioNTech vaccine are administered.
  - U.S. Representative Paul Mitchell (R-Michigan) announces he is leaving the Republican Party and becoming an independent.
- December 15 – President-elect Joe Biden nominates Pete Buttigieg to be Secretary of Transportation, becoming the first openly gay person appointed to a cabinet-level position if confirmed.
- December 17 – Joe Biden nominates Deb Haaland for Secretary of the Interior, becoming the first Native American appointed to a cabinet-level position if confirmed.
- December 18
  - Roy Charles Waller, also known as the NorCal Rapist, is sentenced to 897 years in prison for a series of rapes that spanned from 1991 to 2006.
  - COVID-19 pandemic: The FDA authorizes emergency use of the Moderna COVID-19 vaccine.
- December 21
  - COVID-19 pandemic: Congress passes the Consolidated Appropriations Act, 2021, a packaged $2.3 trillion pandemic relief and omnibus spending bill. At 5,593 pages, it is the longest bill ever passed by Congress.
- December 22
  - President Trump begins issuing a new round of pardons for dozens of associates, including Roger Stone, Paul Manafort, and Charles Kushner.
  - California Secretary of State Alex Padilla is appointed to fill the remaining Senate term of Kamala Harris, becoming the state's first Latino senator.
  - The local council of Murdock, Minnesota gives permit approving for a whites-only church. The Asatru Folk Assembly describes itself as a "warrior" religion of "white people" from northern Europe.
  - The United States Department of Justice begins trial with Walmart and other chain retail stores for illegally selling opioids to its customers.
- December 25 – A suicide car bomb explosion in downtown Nashville, Tennessee leaves multiple people injured.
- December 29
  - A statue of Abraham Lincoln in Boston that featured a slave kneeling before the former president is removed.
  - The Department of Justice announces there will be no charges against the two Cleveland, Ohio police officers accused of killing Tamir Rice.
- December 31
  - COVID-19 pandemic: A Wisconsin pharmacist is arrested after destroying 500 doses of the Moderna vaccine.

== Deaths ==
=== January ===
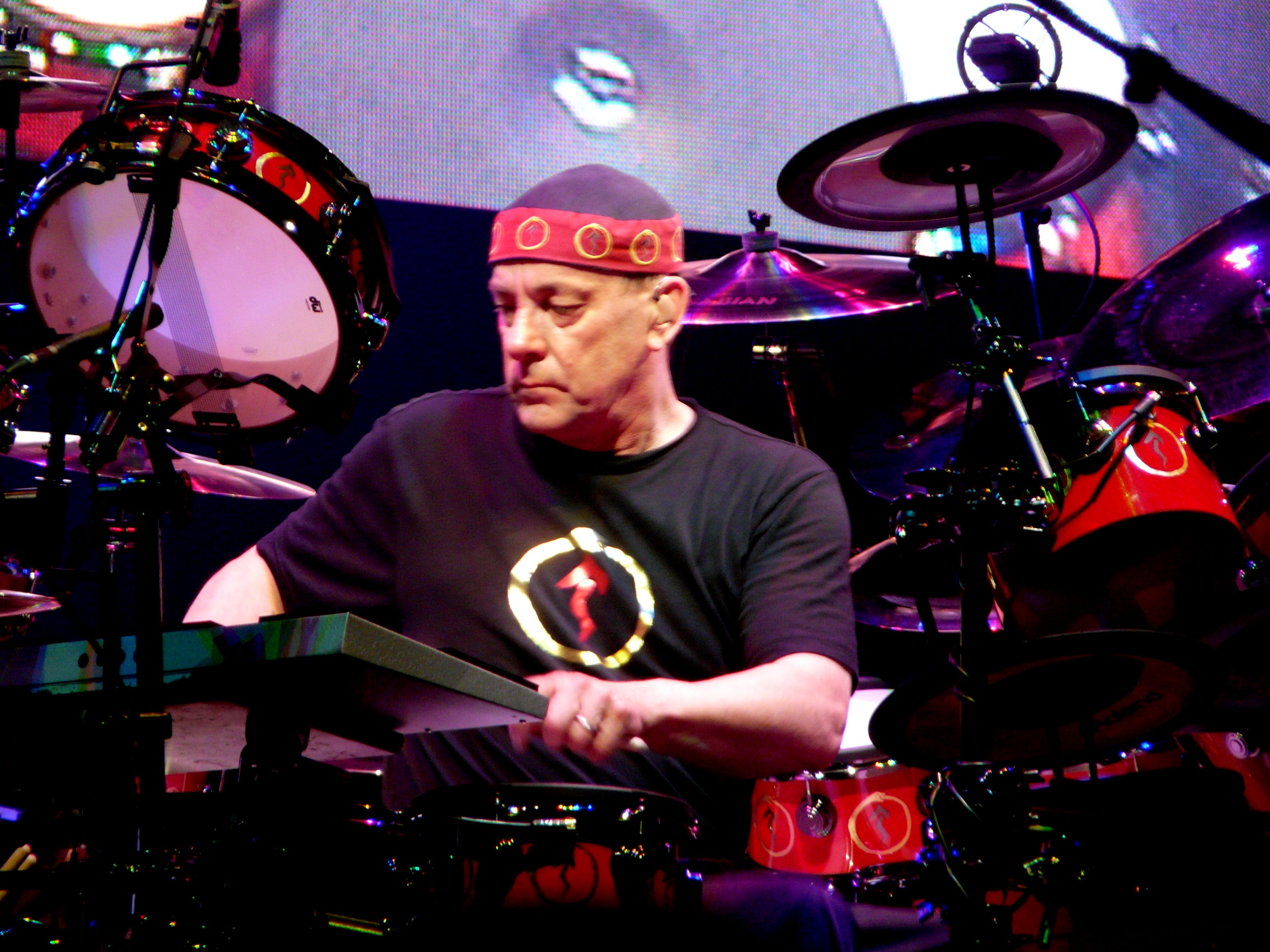
Neil Peart

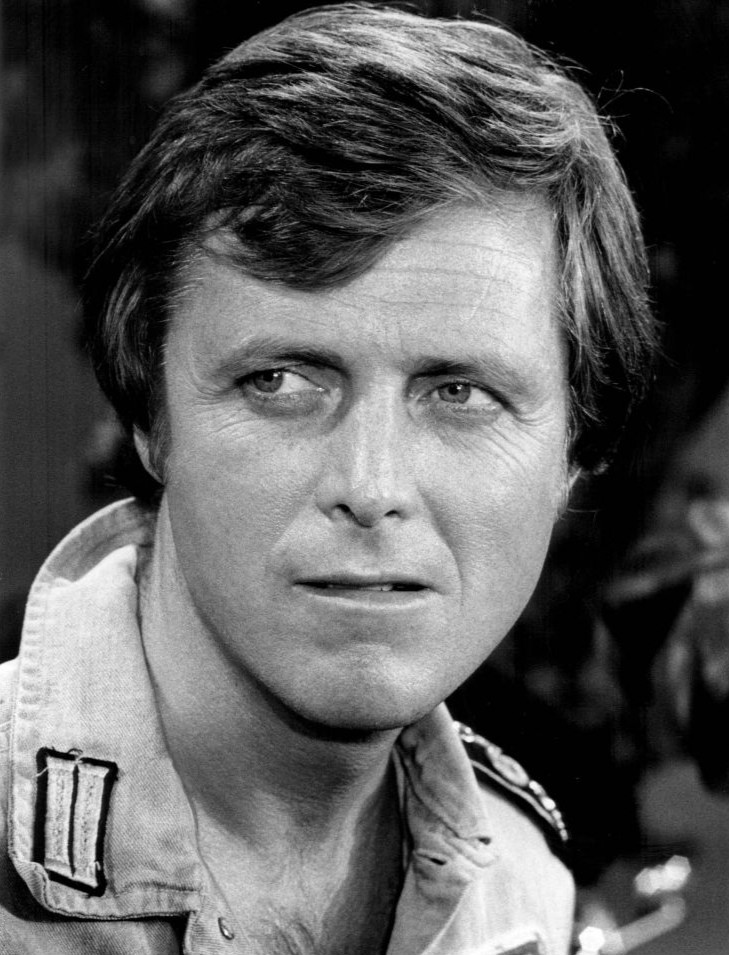
Edd Byrnes

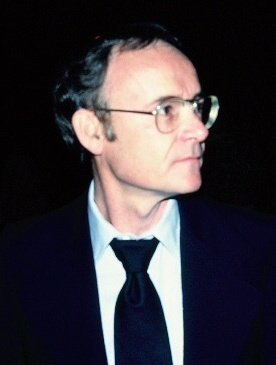
Buck Henry

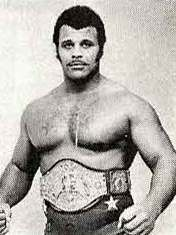
Rocky Johnson

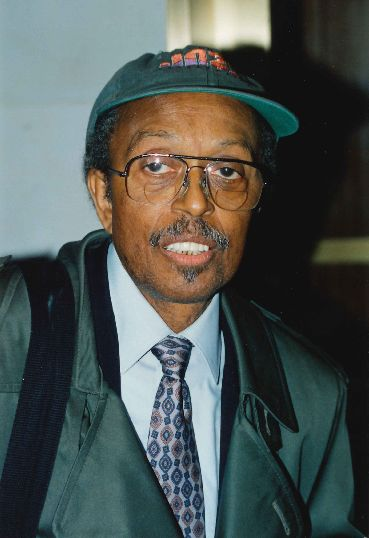
Jimmy Heath

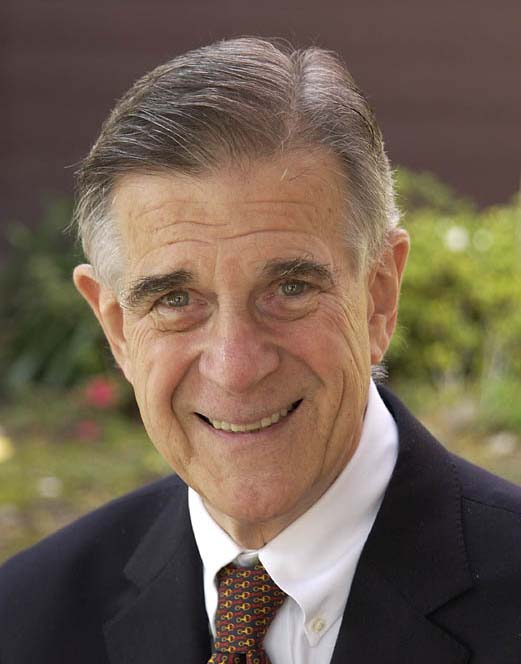
Pete Stark

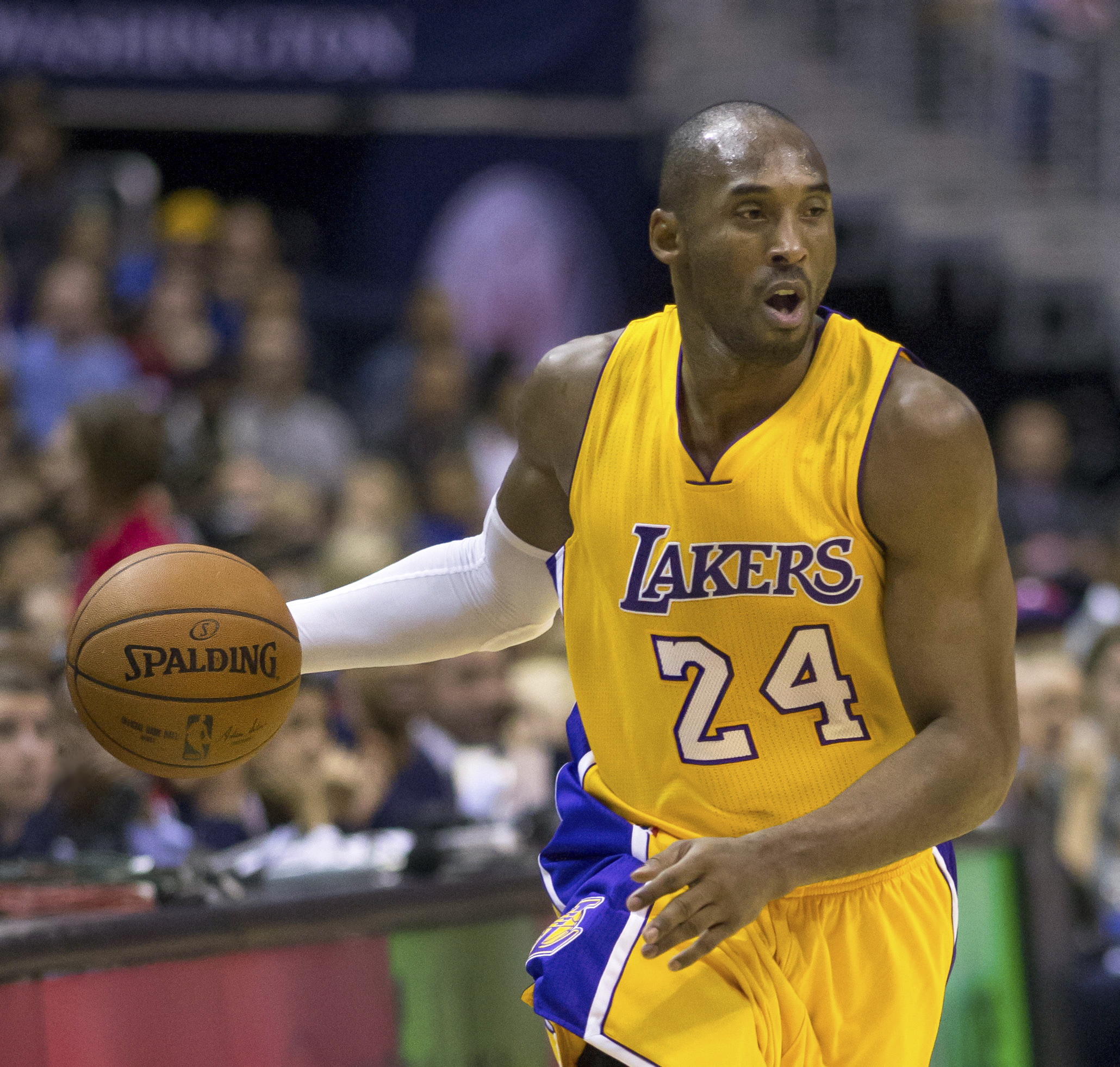
Kobe Bryant

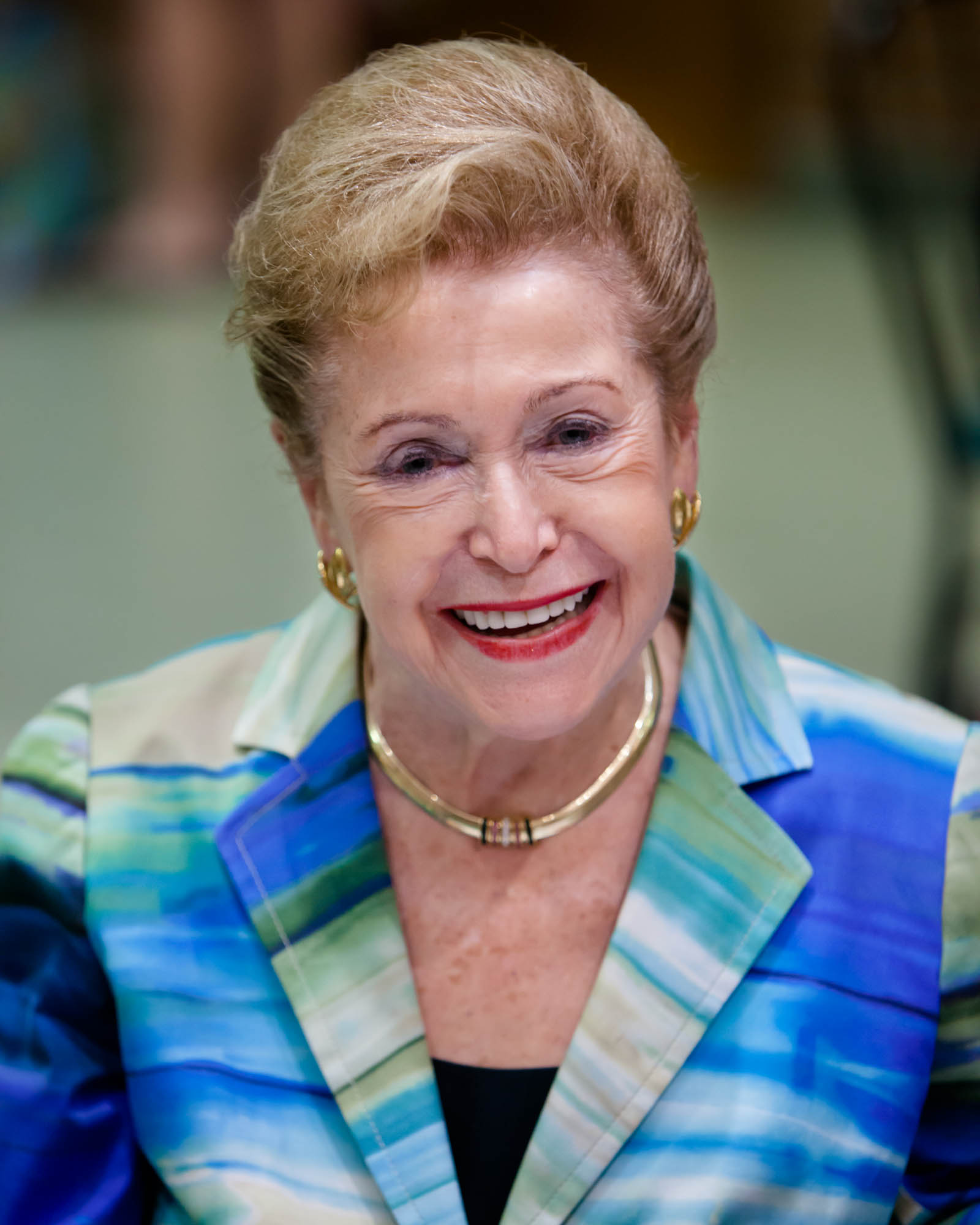
Mary Higgins Clark

- January 1
  - Lexii Alijai, rapper (b. 1998)
  - Tommy Hancock, Western swing fiddler and bandleader (b. 1929)
  - Doug Hart, football player (b. 1939)
  - Don Larsen, baseball player (b. 1929)
  - Roland Minson, basketball player (b. 1929)
  - David Stern, National Basketball Association commissioner (b. 1942)
- January 2
  - John Baldessari, conceptual artist (b. 1931)
  - Tom Buck, politician and lawyer (b. 1938)
  - Lorraine Chandler, soul singer and songwriter (b. 1946)
  - R. Kern Eutsler, United Methodist bishop (b. 1919)
  - Nick Fish, politician and lawyer (b. 1958)
  - Sam Wyche, football player and coach (b. 1945)
- January 3
  - Ken Fuson, journalist (b. 1956)
  - Reuben Hersh, mathematician (b. 1927)
- January 4
  - Emanuel Borok, violinist and concertmaster (b. 1944)
  - James Parks Morton, Episcopal priest (b. 1930)
- January 5 – Betty Pat Gatliff, forensic artist (b. 1930)
- January 6
  - Mike Fitzpatrick, politician (b. 1963)
  - Frank Gordon Jr., judge (b. 1929)
- January 7
  - Silvio Horta, screenwriter and television producer (b. 1974)
  - Neil Peart, Canadian-American drummer and lyricist (b. 1952)
  - George Perles, football coach (b. 1934)
  - Patrick Welch, politician (b. 1948)
  - Elizabeth Wurtzel, writer and journalist (b. 1967)
- January 8
  - Edd Byrnes, actor (b. 1932)
  - Buck Henry, actor, screenwriter, and film director (b. 1930)
- January 9
  - Walter J. Boyne, U.S. Air Force officer and historian (b. 1929)
  - Galen Cole, businessman and philanthropist (b. 1925)
  - Pete Dye, golf course designer (b. 1925)
  - Pampero Firpo, professional wrestler (b. 1930)
  - Mike Resnick, science fiction writer (b. 1942)
  - Hal Smith, baseball player (b. 1930)
- January 10 – Ed Sprague Sr., baseball pitcher (b. 1945)
- January 11
  - Stan Kirsch, actor, screenwriter, and film director (b. 1968)
  - Steve Stiles, cartoonist and writer (b. 1943)
- January 12
  - Jack Baskin, engineer, businessman, and philanthropist (b. 1919)
  - C. Robert Sarcone, politician (b. 1925)
- January 14 – Steve Martin Caro, pop vocalist (b. 1948)
- January 15 – Rocky Johnson, Canadian professional wrestler (b. 1944)
- January 19 – Jimmy Heath, jazz saxophonist (b. 1926)
- January 23 – Jim Lehrer, journalist, novelist and screenwriter (b. 1934)
- January 24 – Pete Stark, businessman and politician (b. 1931)
- January 26
  - John Altobelli, baseball coach (b. 1963)
  - Gianna Bryant, basketball player (b. 2006)
  - Kobe Bryant, basketball player (b. 1978)
  - Louis Nirenberg, Canadian-American mathematician (b. 1925)
- January 28 – Chris Doleman, American Hall of Fame football player (b. 1961)
- January 31 – Mary Higgins Clark, author (b. 1927)

=== February ===
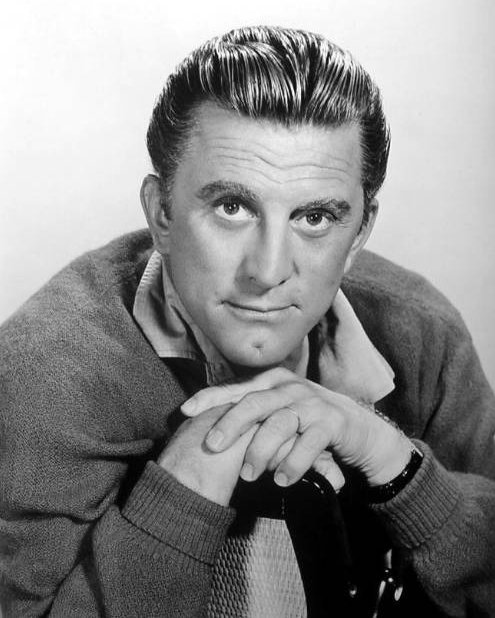
Kirk Douglas

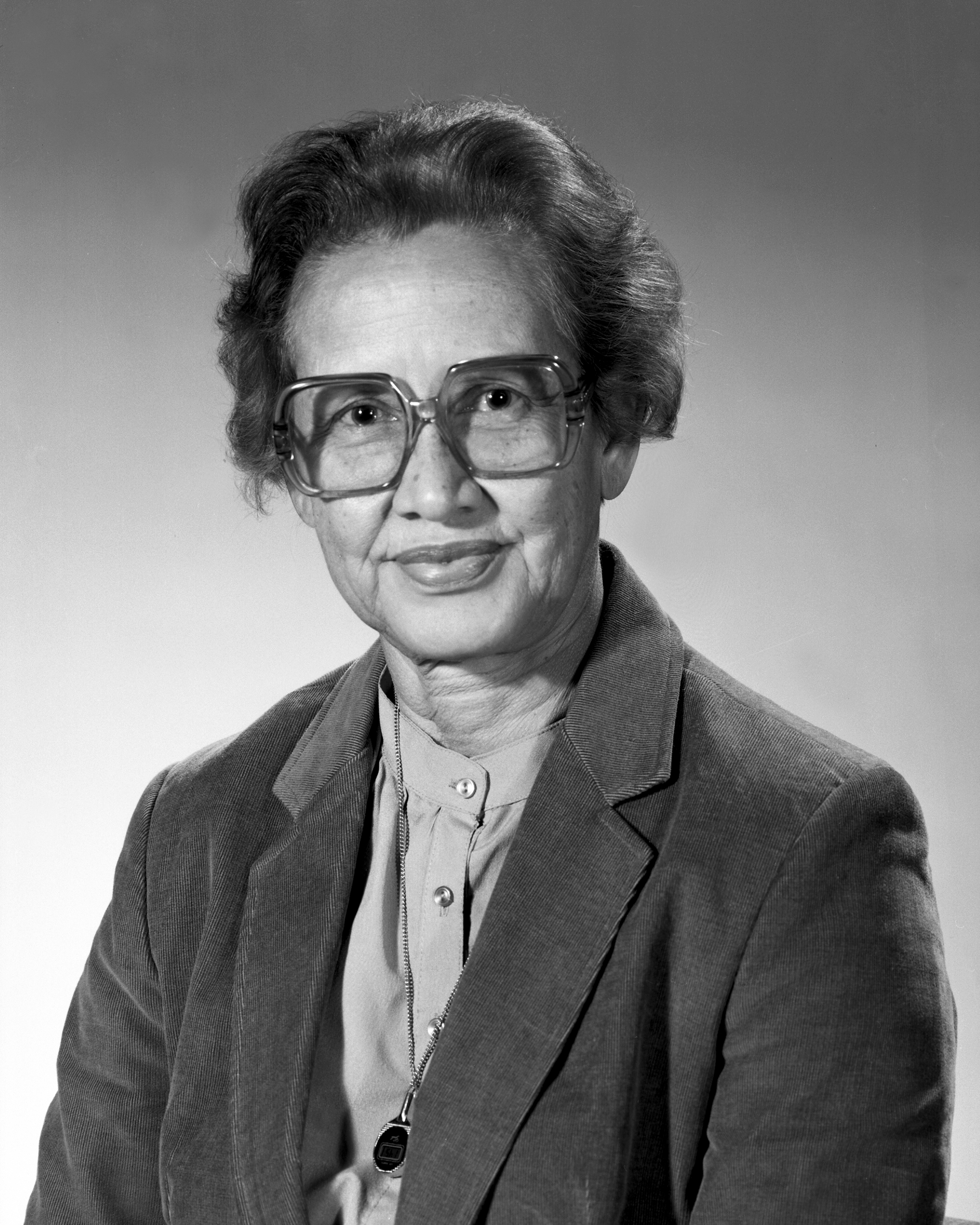
Katherine Johnson

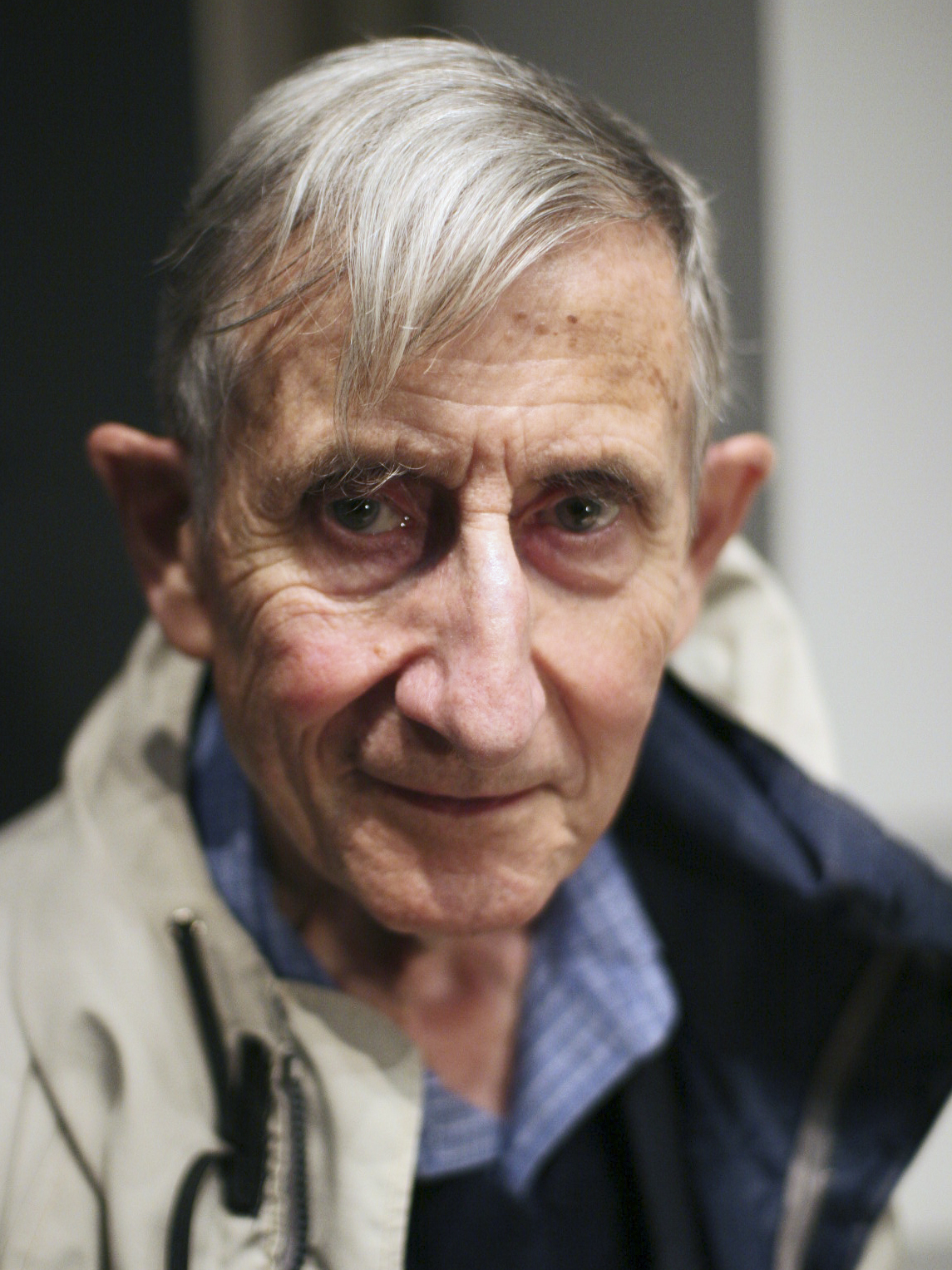
Freeman Dyson

- February 3
  - Gene Reynolds, actor, television writer, director, and producer (b. 1923)
  - George Steiner, French-American literary critic and essayist (b. 1929)
  - Willie Wood, American Hall of Fame professional football player (b. 1936)
- February 5
  - Stanley Cohen, biochemist (b. 1922)
  - Kirk Douglas, actor, director, producer (b. 1916)
- February 7 – Orson Bean, actor and comedian (b. 1928)
- February 8
  - Robert Conrad, actor (b. 1935)
  - Dave McCoy, founder of the Mammoth Mountain Ski Area (b. 1915)
- February 9 – Paula Kelly, dancer, singer, and actress (b. 1942)
- February 10 – Lyle Mays, jazz pianist and composer (b. 1953)
- February 14 – Lynn Cohen, actress (b. 1933)
- February 16 – Larry Tesler, computer scientist (b. 1945)
- February 17
  - Ja'Net DuBois, actress (b. 1945)
  - Mickey Wright, American Hall of Fame professional golfer (b. 1935)
- February 19 – Pop Smoke, rapper (b. 1998)
- February 22 – Laurence Rappaport, politician (b. 1940)
- February 24
  - Diana Serra Cary, child actress (b. 1918)
  - Clive Cussler, author (b. 1931)
  - Katherine Johnson, mathematician (b. 1918)
- February 27
  - R. D. Call, actor (b. 1950)
  - Colin S. Gray, British-American writer (b. 1943)
- February 28 – Freeman Dyson, British-born American physicist and mathematician (b. 1923)
- February 29 – Bill Bunten, politician (b. 1930)

=== March ===
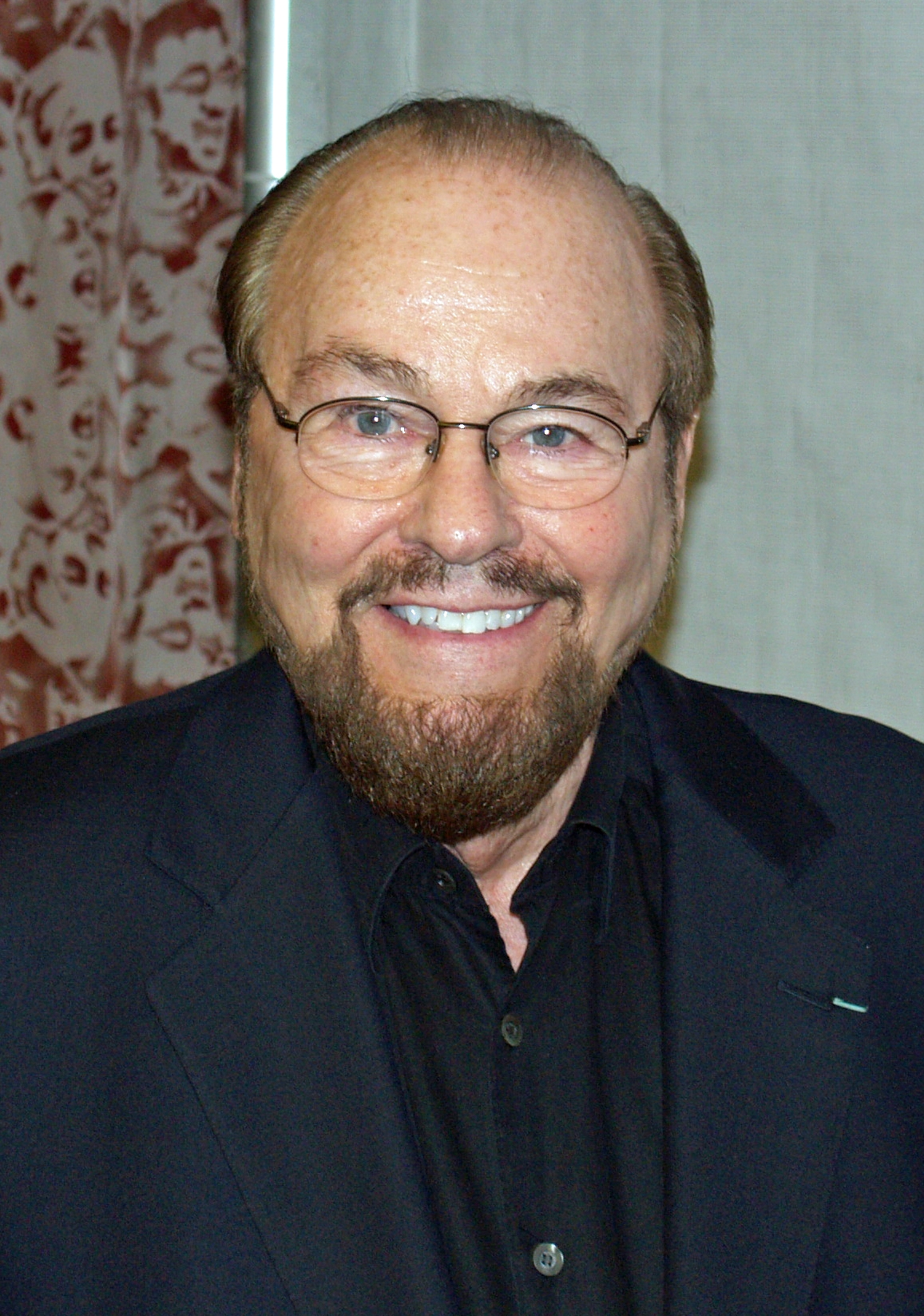
James Lipton

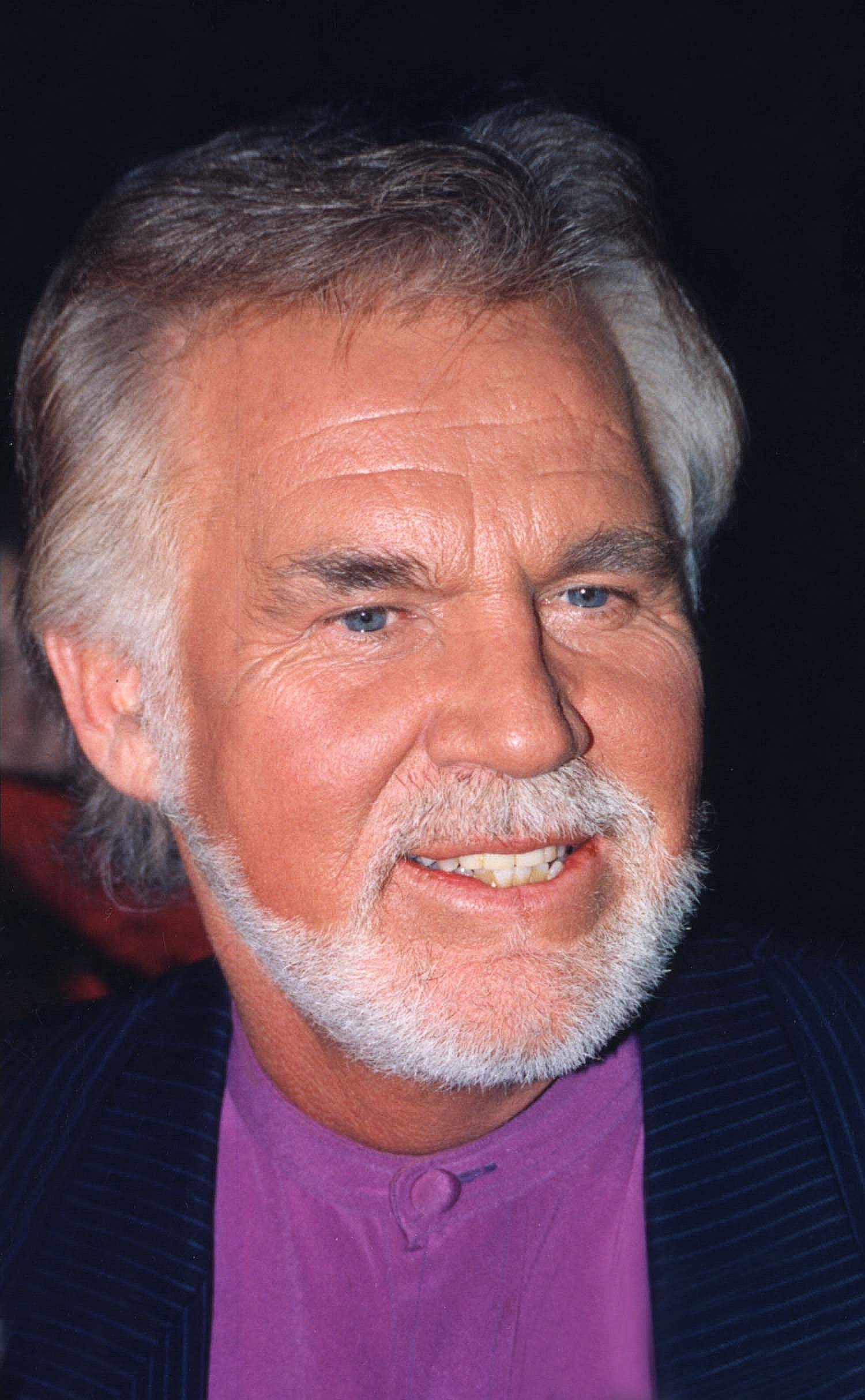
Kenny Rogers

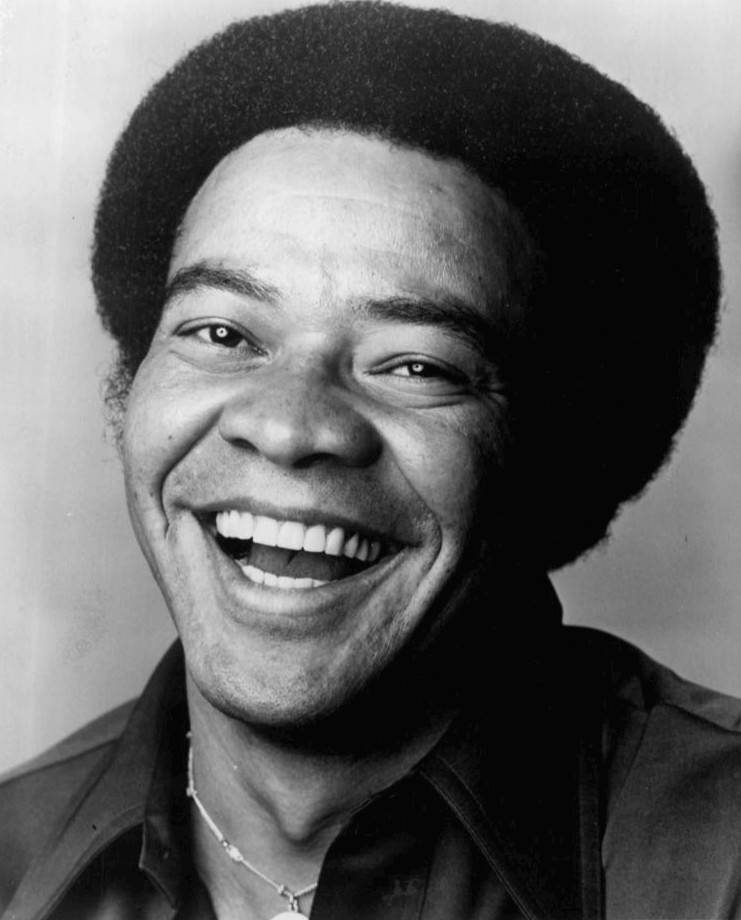
Bill Withers

- March 1 – Jack Welch, businessman, engineer and writer (b. 1935)
- March 2 – James Lipton, television host (b. 1926)
- March 6 – McCoy Tyner, jazz pianist (b. 1938)
- March 11 – Charles Wuorinen, American composer (b. 1938)
- March 16 – Stuart Whitman, American actor (b. 1928)
- March 17
  - Roger Mayweather, American professional boxer and trainer (b. 1961)
  - Lyle Waggoner, American actor (b. 1935)
  - Alfred Worden, American astronaut (b. 1932)
- March 20 – Kenny Rogers, country singer and songwriter (b. 1938)
- March 24
  - Stuart Gordon, American film director (b. 1947)
  - Terrence McNally, American playwright (b. 1938)
- March 26 – Curly Neal, American basketball player with the Harlem Globetrotters (b. 1942)
- March 27 – Joseph Lowery, minister and civil rights activist (b. 1921)
- March 28 – Tom Coburn, politician and physician (b. 1948)
- March 29
  - Philip W. Anderson, American physicist (b. 1923)
  - Joe Diffie, country singer (b. 1958)
- March 30
  - Tomie dePaola, children's author and illustrator (b. 1934)
  - Bill Withers, American singer-songwriter and musician (b. 1938)

=== April ===
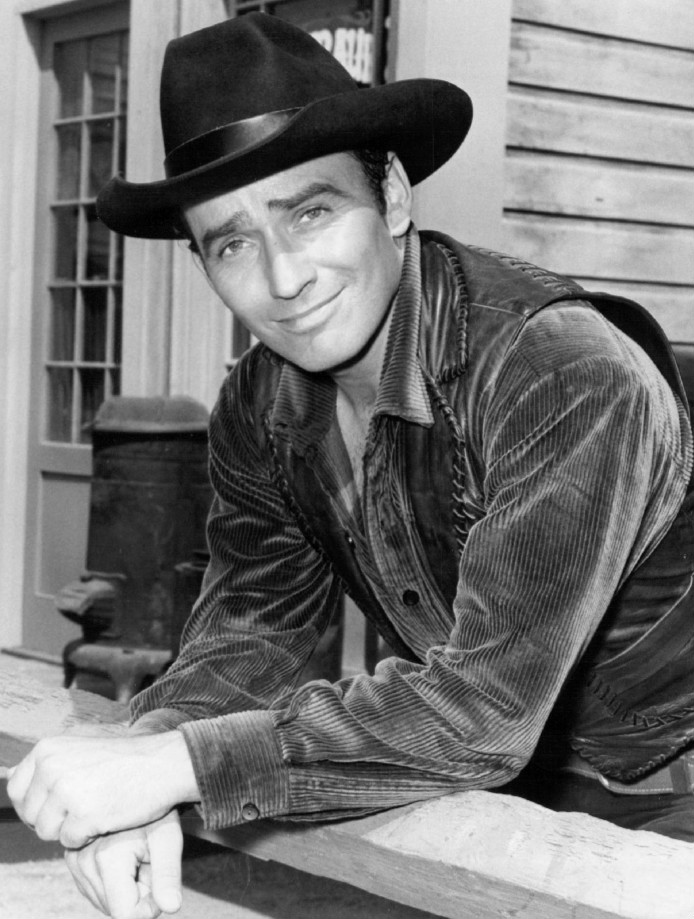
James Drury

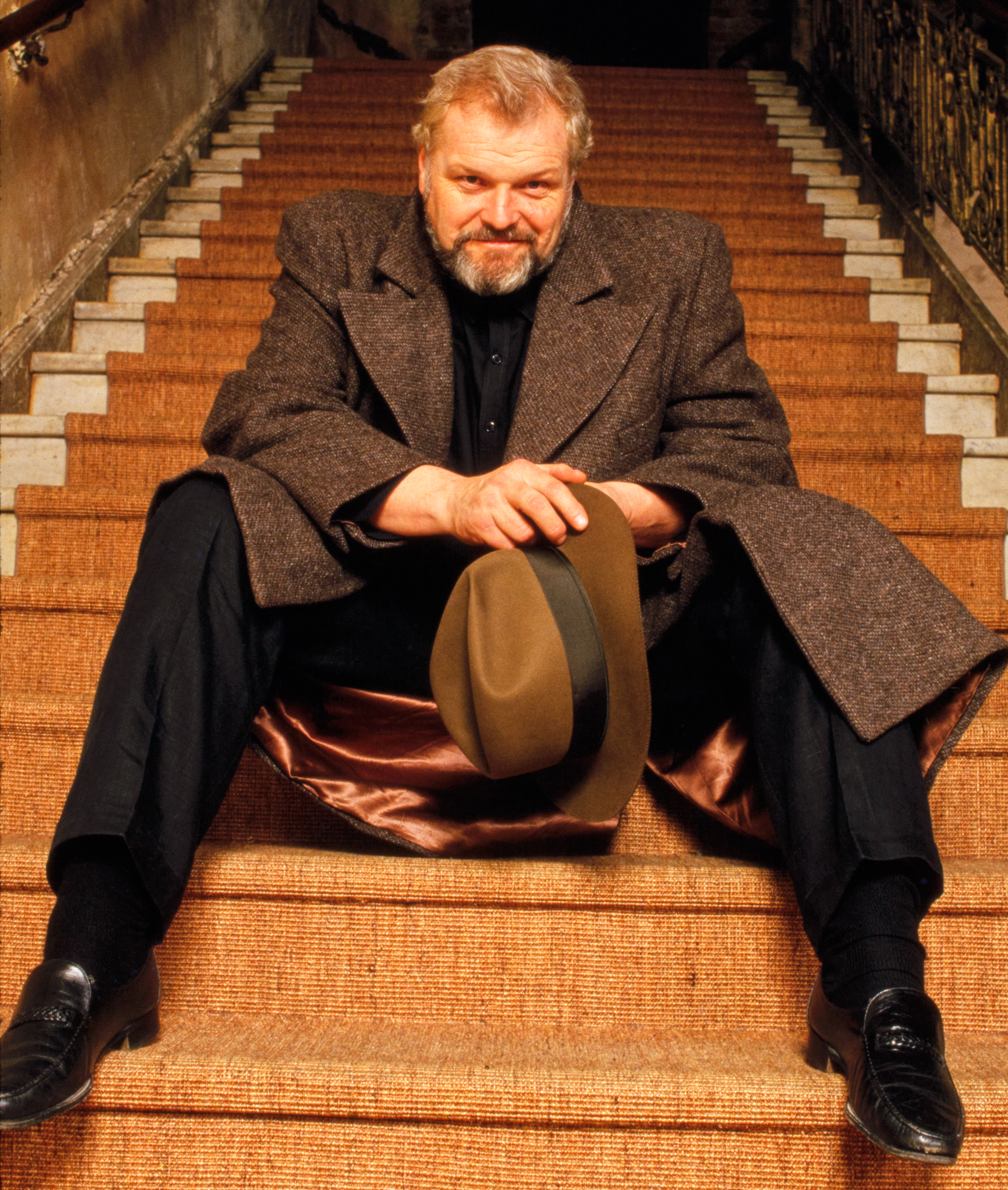
Brian Dennehy

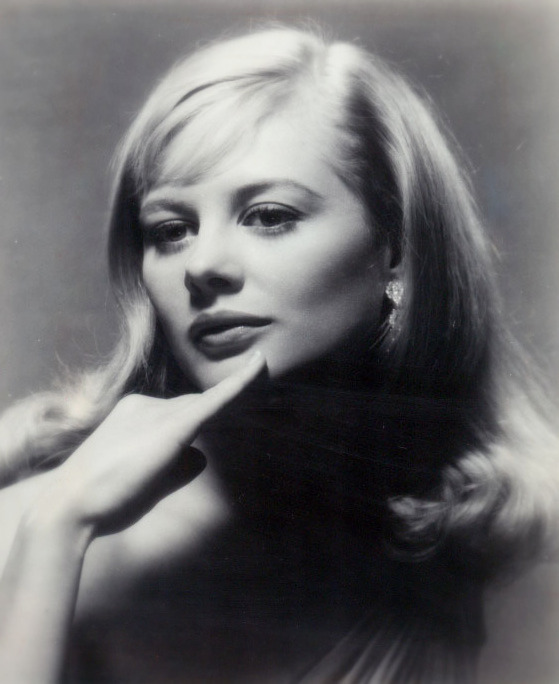
Shirley Knight

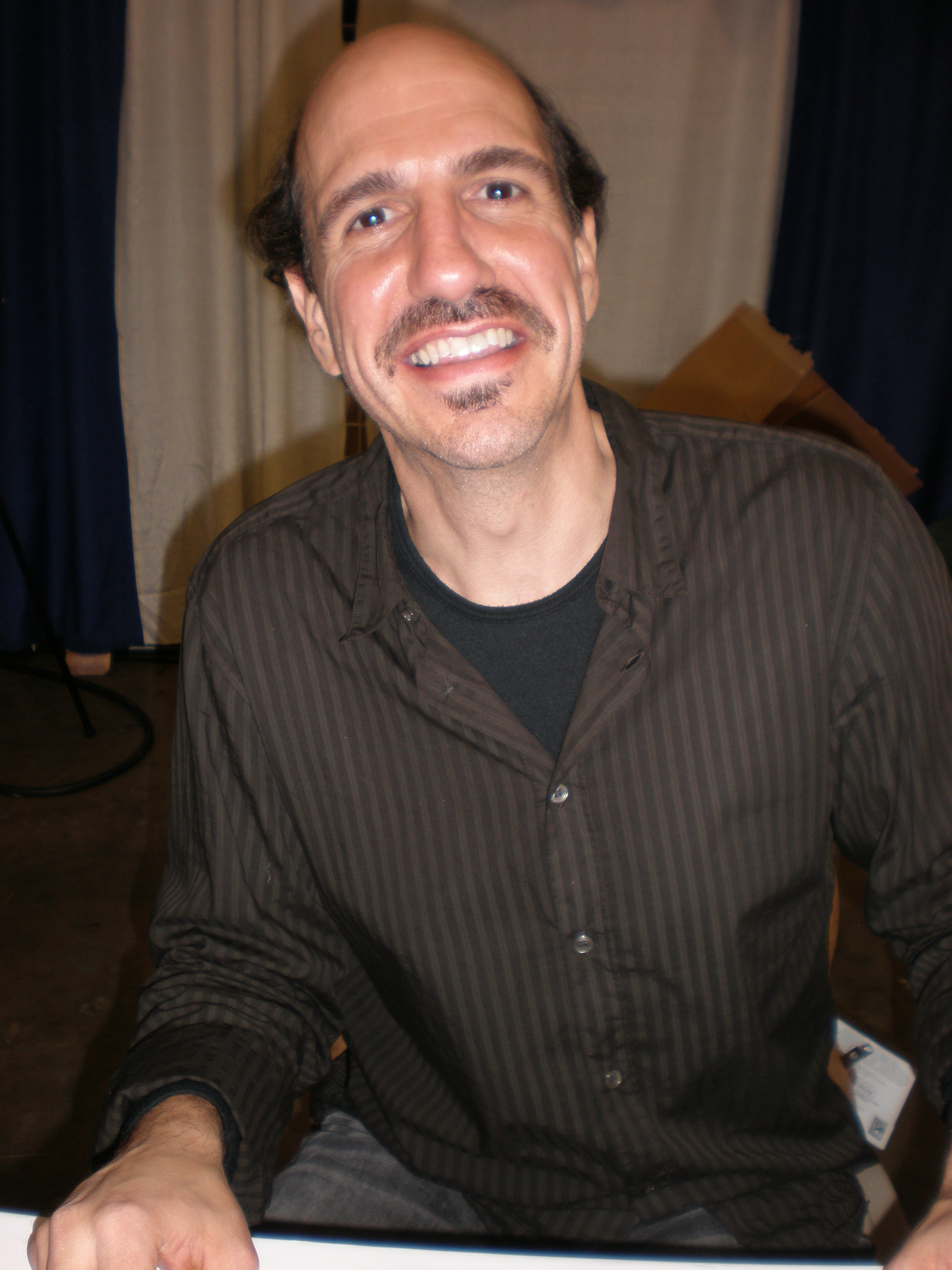
Sam Lloyd

- April 1
  - Anne Hendricks Bass, investor and philanthropist (b. 1941)
  - Cristina, singer (b. 1959)
  - David Driskell, visual artist and academic (b. 1931)
  - Kevin Duffy, jurist (b. 1933)
  - Ed Farmer, baseball player (b. 1949)
  - Edward L. Feightner, Navy officer and flying ace (b. 1919)
  - Ellis Marsalis Jr., jazz pianist (b. 1934)
  - Bucky Pizzarelli, jazz guitarist (b. 1926)
  - Adam Schlesinger, musician (b. 1967)
- April 4 – Tom Dempsey, American professional football player (b. 1947)
- April 5 – Bobby Mitchell, American Hall of Fame professional football player. (b. 1935)
- April 6
  - James Drury, American actor (b. 1934)
  - Al Kaline, American professional baseball player, announcer, and executive (Detroit Tigers) (b. 1934)
  - Fred Singer, Austrian-born American physicist (b. 1924)
- April 7
  - John Prine, folk singer (b. 1946)
  - Herb Stempel, game show contestant (b. 1926)
- April 8 – Norman I. Platnick, American arachnologist and curator (b. 1951)
- April 12 – Tarvaris Jackson, NFL Quarterback (b. 1983)
- April 14 – Hank Steinbrenner, American businessman and part owner of the New York Yankees (b. 1957)
- April 15
  - Allen Daviau, American cinematographer (b. 1942)
  - Brian Dennehy, American actor (b. 1938)
  - Lee Konitz, American composer and alto saxophonist (b. 1927)
- April 16
  - Gene Deitch, American-born Czech illustrator, animator, and comics artist (b. 1924)
  - Howard Finkel, American wrestling ring announcer (b. 1950)
- April 18 –
  - Paul H. O'Neill, American politician (b. 1935)
  - Anne Priestley, American politician (b. 1932)
- April 20 – Tom Lester, American actor and evangelist (b. 1938)
- April 21 – Dimitri Diatchenko, American actor (b. 1968)
- April 22
  - Vanessa Guillen, soldier, murder victim (b. 1999)
  - Shirley Knight, actress (b. 1936)
- April 27
  - Lynn Harrell, classical cellist (b. 1944)
  - Troy Sneed, gospel musician (b. 1967)
- April 30 – Sam Lloyd, American actor, singer, and musician (b. 1963)

=== May ===
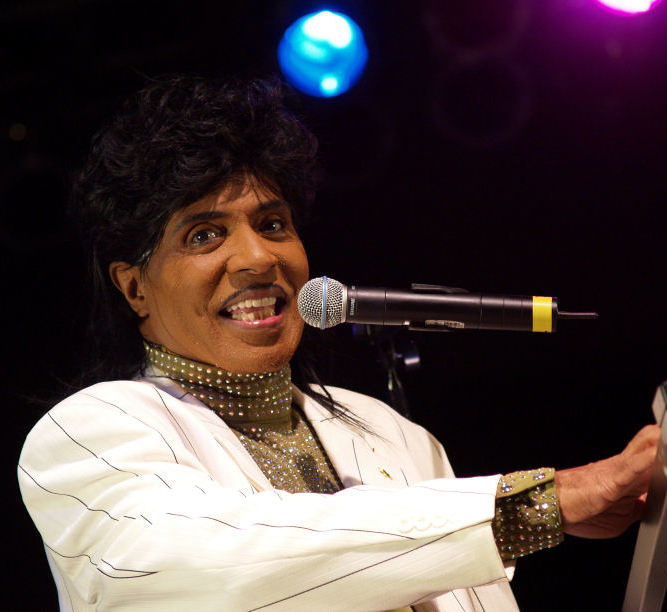
Little Richard

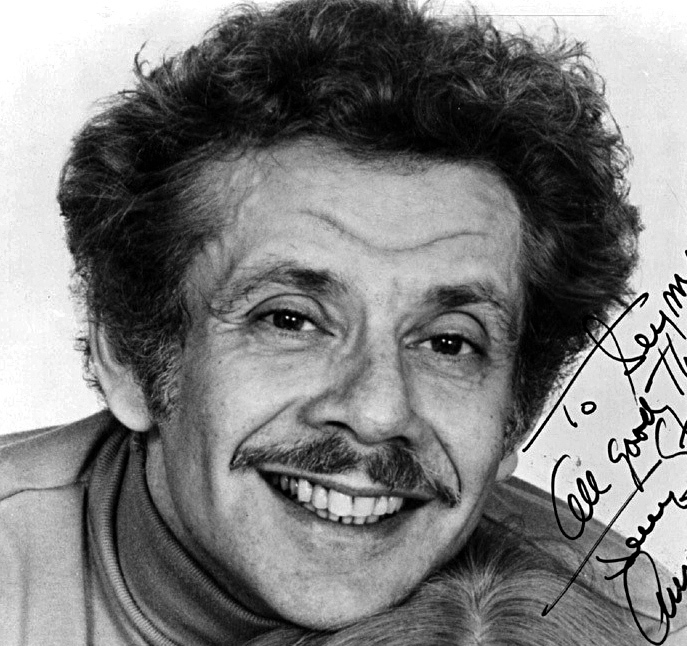
Jerry Stiller

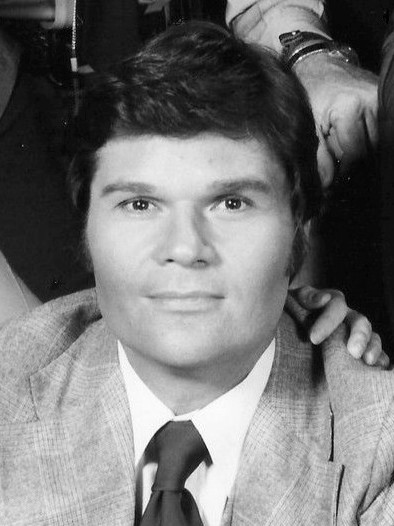
Fred Willard

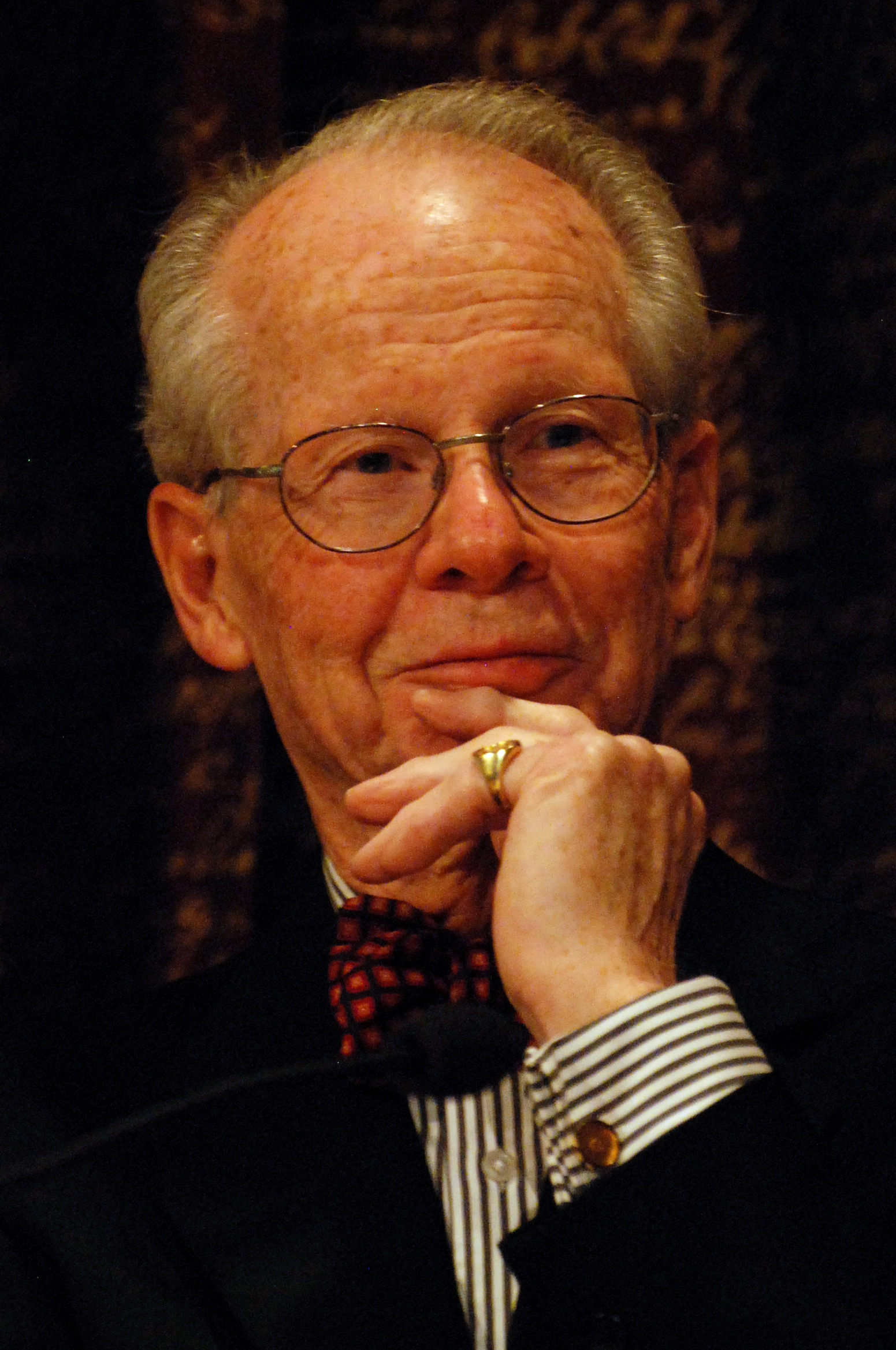
Oliver E. Williamson

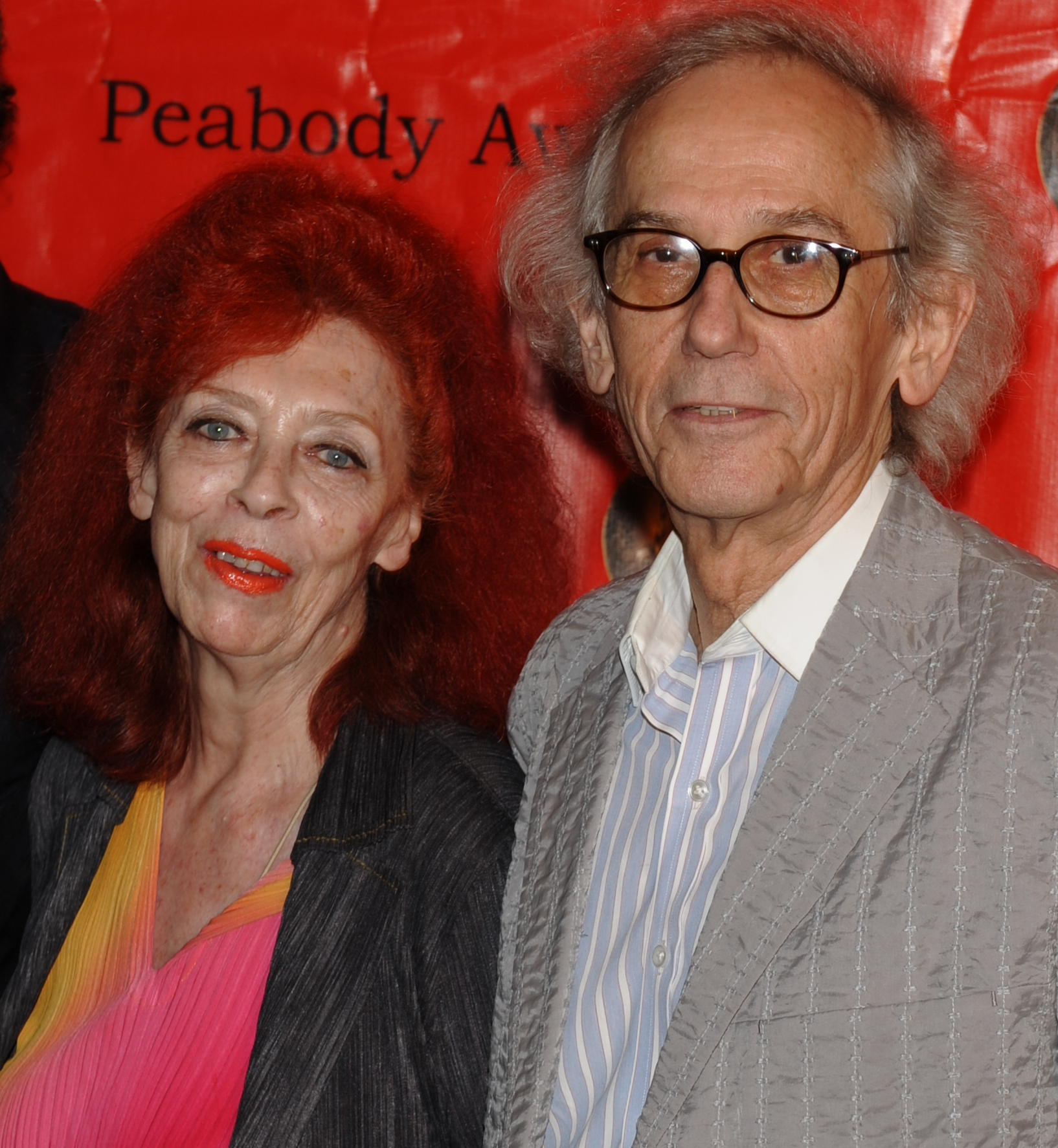
Christo

- May 3 – John Ericson, German-born American actor (b. 1926)
- May 4
  - Michael McClure, American poet and playwright (b. 1932)
  - Don Shula, American football player and coach (b. 1930)
  - Marion Hartzog Smoak, American lawyer and politician (b. 1916)
- May 7 – Mike Storen, American sports executive in basketball, baseball, and football.(b. 1935)
- May 8 – Roy Horn, German-American magician (b. 1944)
- May 9 – Little Richard, American singer, songwriter, and musician (b. 1932)
- May 10 – Betty Wright, American soul and R&B singer (b. 1953)
- May 11 – Jerry Stiller, American actor and comedian (b. 1927)
- May 14
  - Phyllis George, American businesswoman, actress, and sportscaster (b. 1949)
  - Bob Watson, American professional baseball player and sports executive (b. 1946)
- May 15
  - Lynn Shelton, American filmmaker (b. 1965)
  - Fred Willard, American actor and comedian (b. 1939)
- May 17
  - Shad Gaspard, American professional wrestler and actor (b. 1981)
  - Lucky Peterson, American blues singer and musician (b. 1964)
- May 19 – Ravi Zacharias, Indian-born Canadian-American Christian apologist (b. 1946)
- May 21 – Oliver E. Williamson, American economist (b. 1932)
- May 22 – Jerry Sloan, American basketball player and coach (b. 1942)
- May 24 –
  - Jimmy Cobb, American jazz drummer (b. 1929)
  - Vincent Migliore, American politician.
- May 25 – George Floyd, American truck driver and security guard, murder victim (b. 1973)
- May 26 – Richard Herd, American actor (b. 1932)
- May 27 – Larry Kramer, American author and LGBT rights activist (b. 1935)
- May 30 – Bobby Morrow, American athlete (b. 1935)
- May 31 – Christo, Bulgarian-American artist (b. 1935)

=== June ===
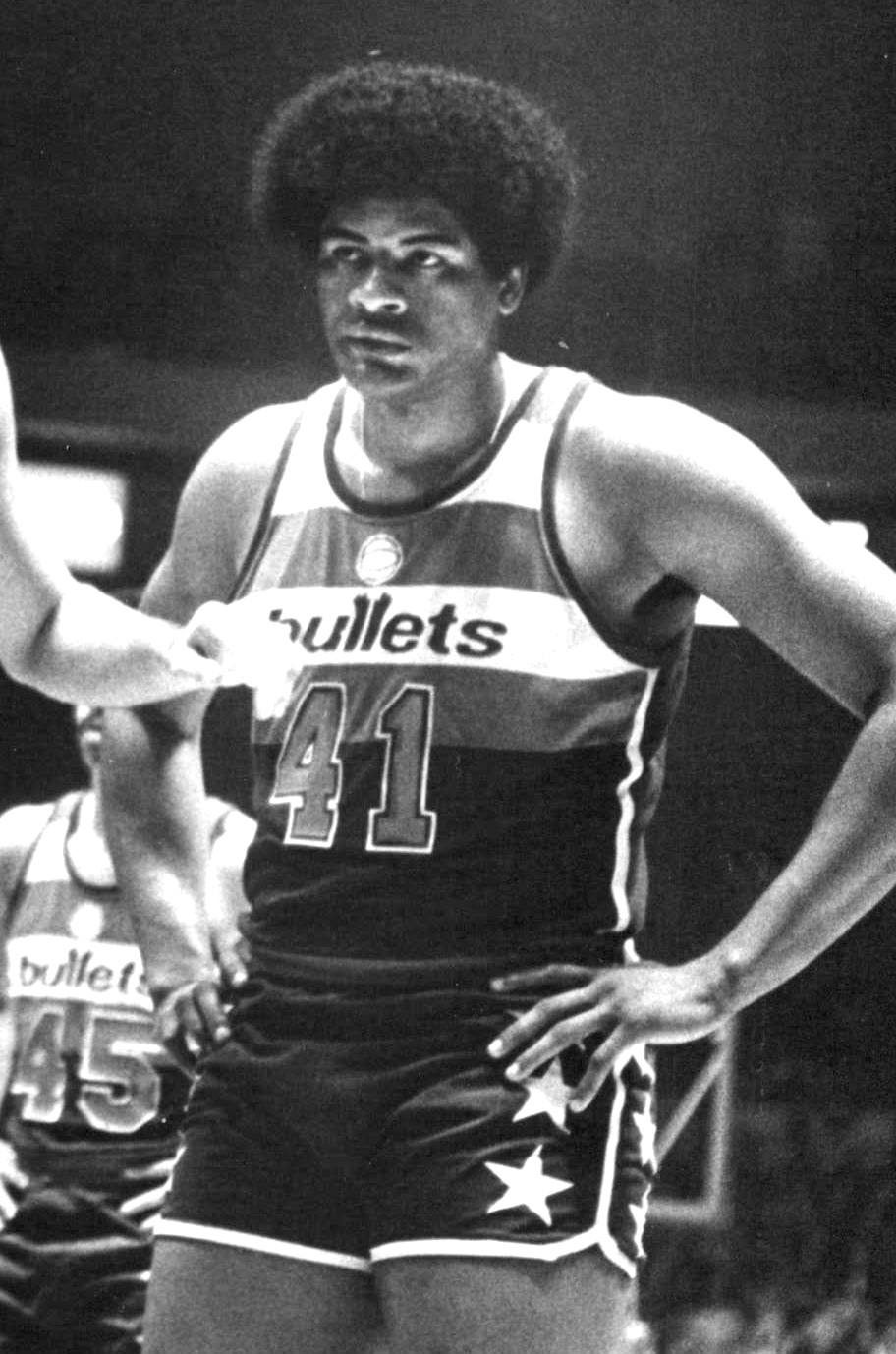
Wes Unseld

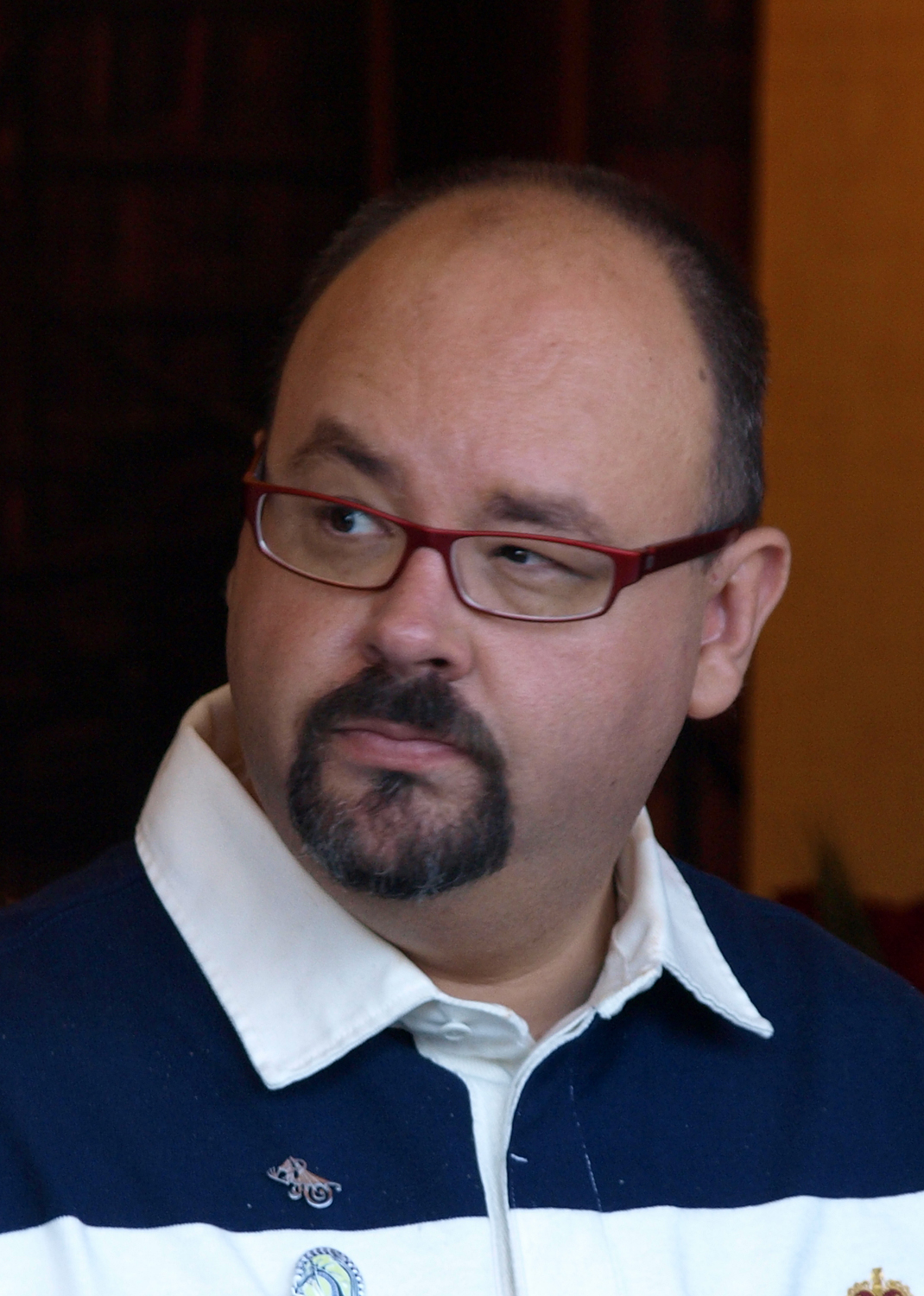
Carlos Ruiz Zafón

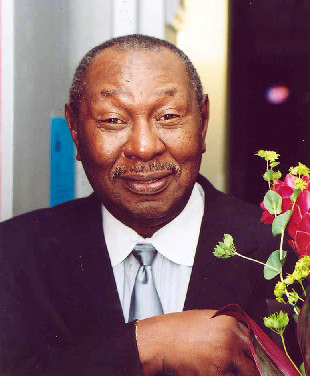
Freddy Cole

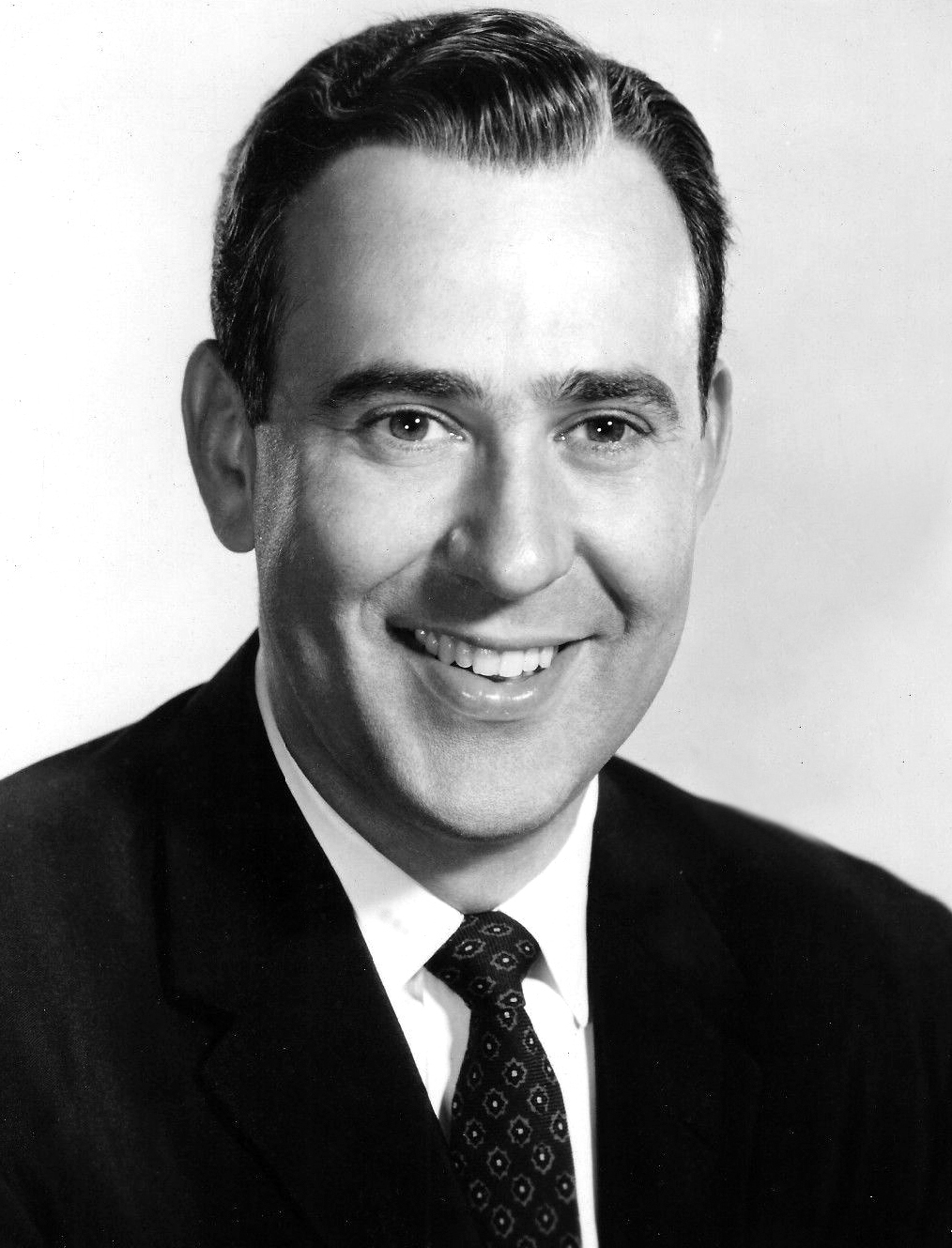
Carl Reiner

- June 1 – Pat Dye, American football player, coach, and college athletics administrator (b. 1939)
- June 2
  - Mary Pat Gleason, actress (b. 1950)
  - Wes Unseld, American Hall of Fame professional basketball player, coach and executive (b. 1946)
- June 4 – Pete Rademacher, Olympic boxing champion (b. 1928)
- June 6 – Reche Caldwell, NFL Wide Receiver (b. 1979)
- June 10 – Claudell Washington, American professional baseball outfielder (b. 1954)
- June 11
  - Dennis O'Neil, comic book writer (b. 1939)
  - David N. Vaughan Jr., politician (b. 1935)
  - Mel Winkler, actor (b. 1941)
- June 13 – Dick Garmaker, basketball player (b. 1932)
- June 17
  - Dan Foster, radio DJ (b. 1958)
  - Jean Kennedy Smith, diplomat (b. 1928)
- June 19 – Carlos Ruiz Zafón, Spanish novelist (b. 1964)
- June 20 – Emma Harman, American politician (b. 1912)
- June 26
  - Kelly Asbury, film director and animator (b. 1960)
  - Milton Glaser, graphic designer (b. 1929)
- June 27 – Freddy Cole, jazz singer and pianist (b. 1931)
- June 28 – Rudolfo Anaya, author (b. 1937)
- June 29
  - Johnny Mandel, composer (b. 1925)
  - Carl Reiner, actor, film director and comedian (b. 1922)

=== July ===
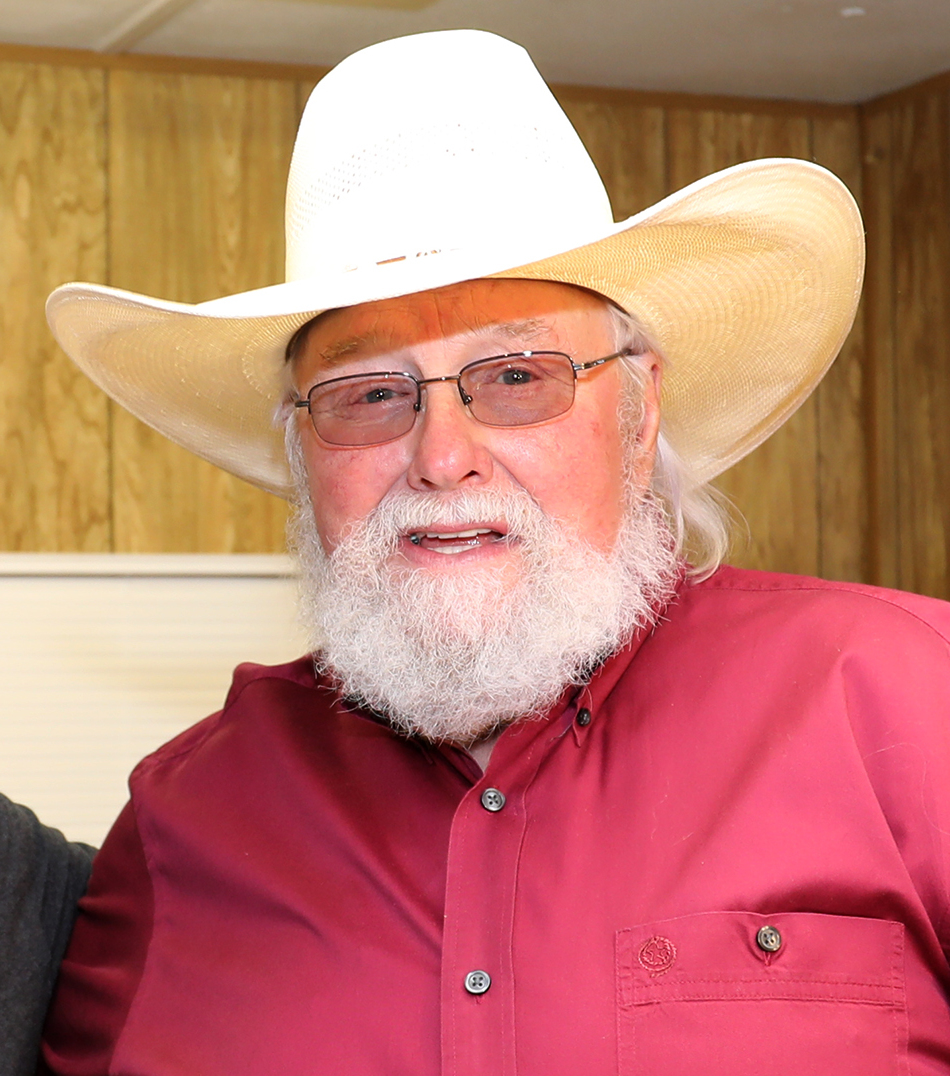
Charlie Daniels

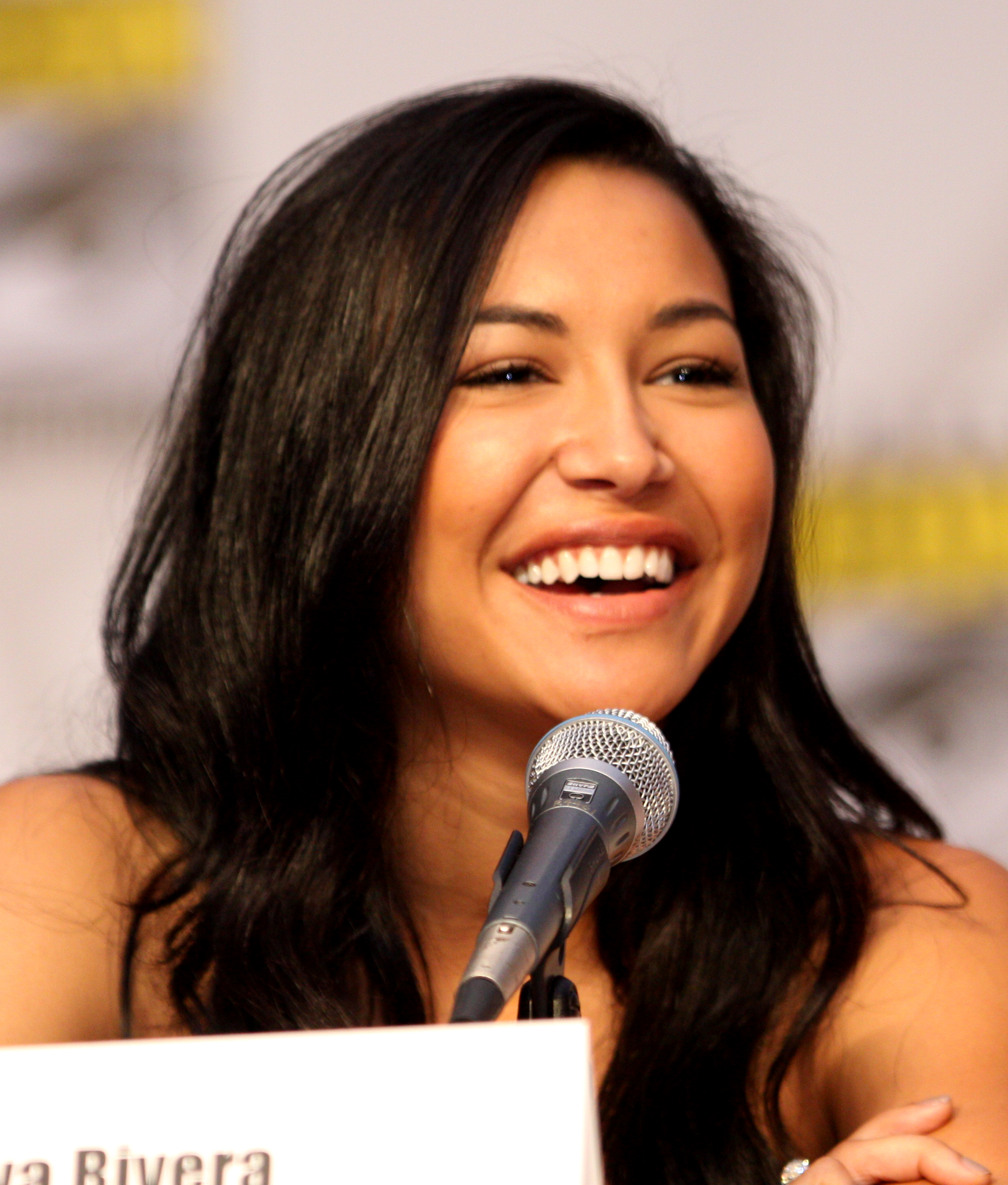
Naya Rivera

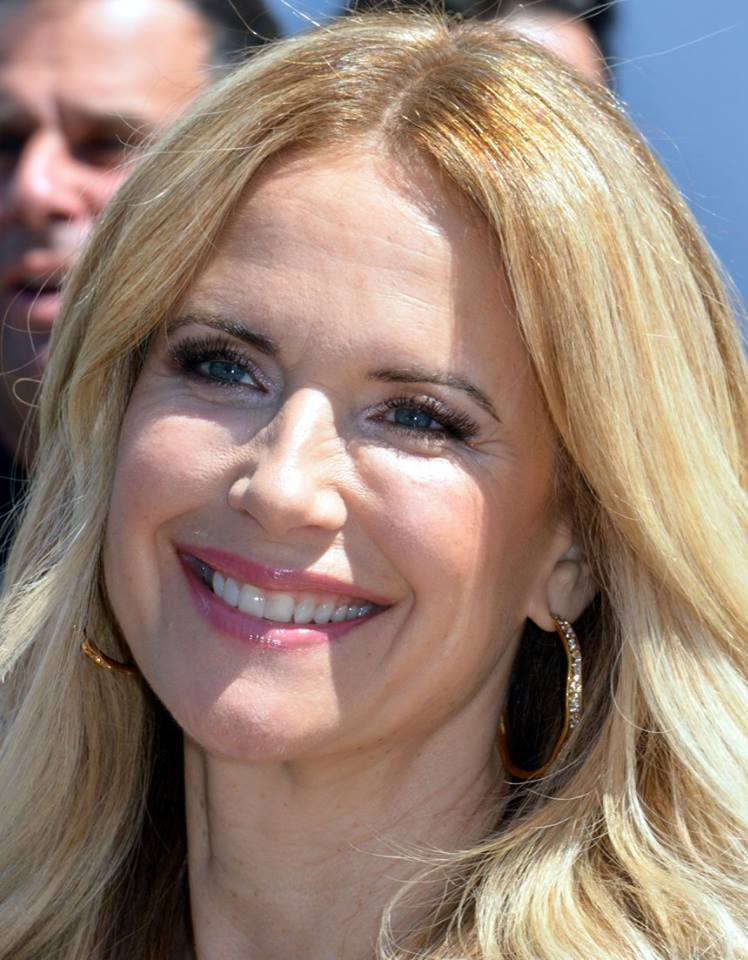
Kelly Preston

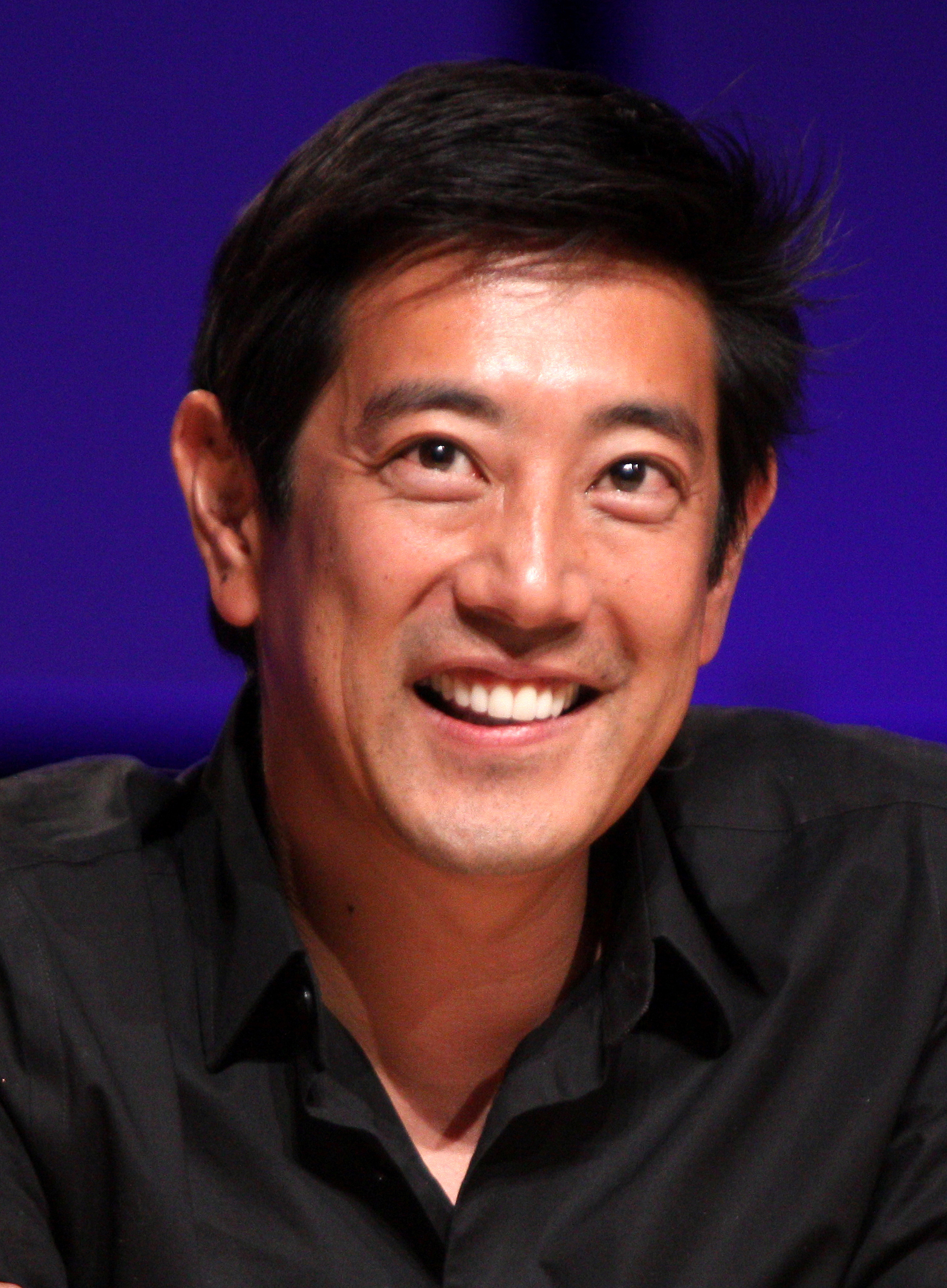
Grant Imahara

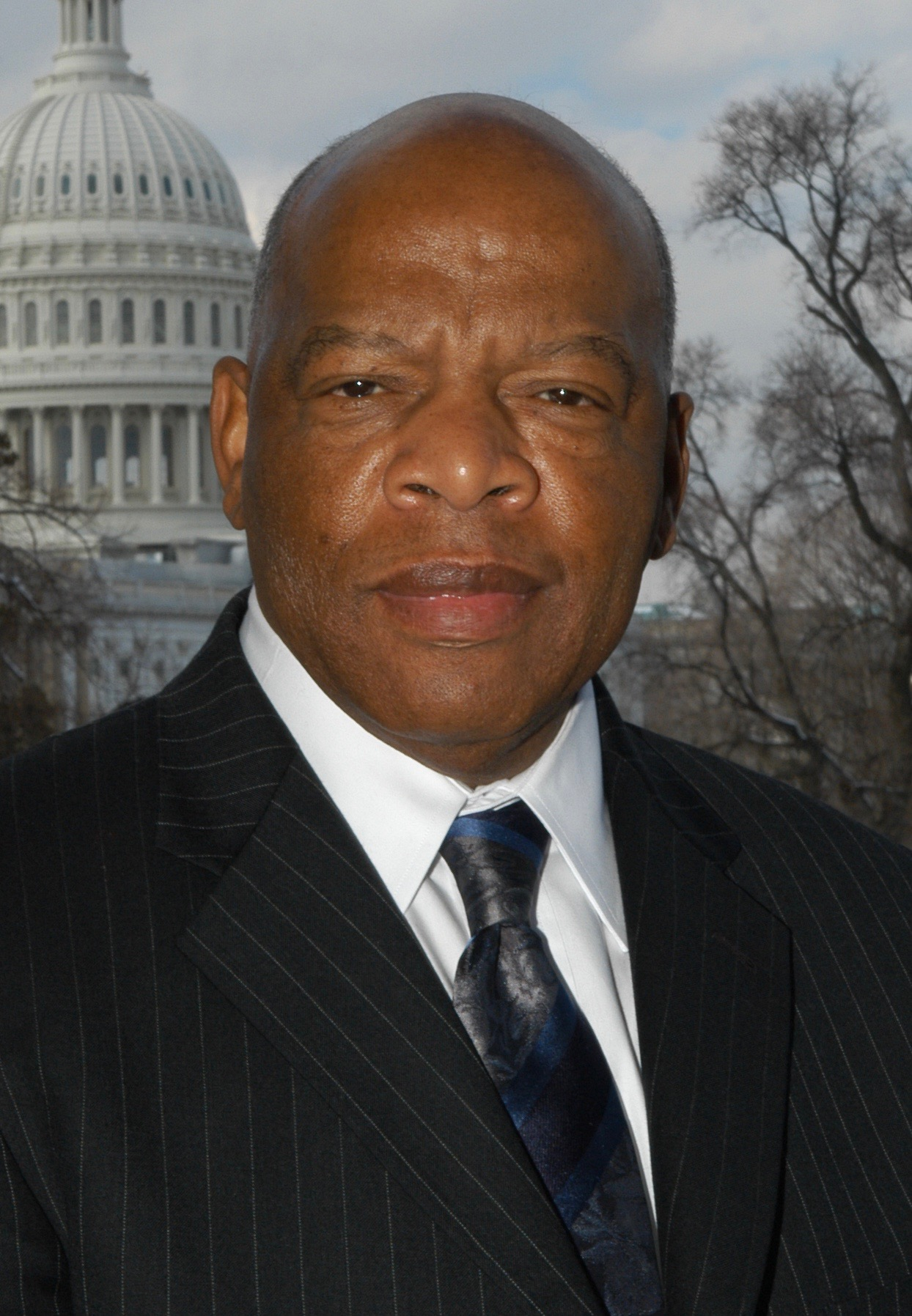
John Lewis

- July 1 – Hugh Downs, broadcaster and television personality (b. 1921)
- July 2
  - Betsy Ancker-Johnson, American plasma physicist (b. 1927)
  - Christian Garrison, American writer (b. 1942)
  - Jon Gilliam, American football player (b. 1938)
  - Reckful, American gamer and Twitch streamer (b. 1989)
- July 5 – Nick Cordero, Broadway actor and singer (Bullets Over Broadway) (A Bronx Tale) (Waitress)(b. 1978)
- July 6
  - Mary Kay Letourneau, schoolteacher, convicted of having sex with a minor. Later marrying the victim, her former student (b. 1962)
  - Charlie Daniels, country singer-songwriter and musician (b. 1936)
  - Ronald Graham, mathematician (b. 1935)
- July 8 – Naya Rivera, actress, model and singer (b. 1987)
- July 12 – Kelly Preston, actress and model (b. 1962)
- July 13
  - Grant Imahara, electrical engineer, roboticist, and television host (b. 1970)
  - Fahim Saleh, entrepreneur, computer programmer, and founder Gokada (b. 1986)
- July 16 – Phyllis Somerville, actress (b. 1943)
- July 17
  - John Lewis, civil-rights leader and politician (b. 1940)
  - C. T. Vivian, minister, author and lieutenant of Martin Luther King Jr. (b. 1924)
- July 18 – Sylvia Gale, activist and politician, member of the New Hampshire House of Representatives (2012–2014), (b. 1950).
- July 20 – Michael Brooks, political commentator and talk show host (b. 1983)
- July 21 – Annie Ross, Scottish-American singer and actress (b. 1930)
- July 24 – Regis Philbin, actor, singer, and media personality (b. 1931)
- July 25 – John Saxon, actor (b. 1936)
- July 26 – Olivia de Havilland, British-born American actress (b. 1916)
- July 30 – Herman Cain, businessman and politician (b. 1945)

=== August ===
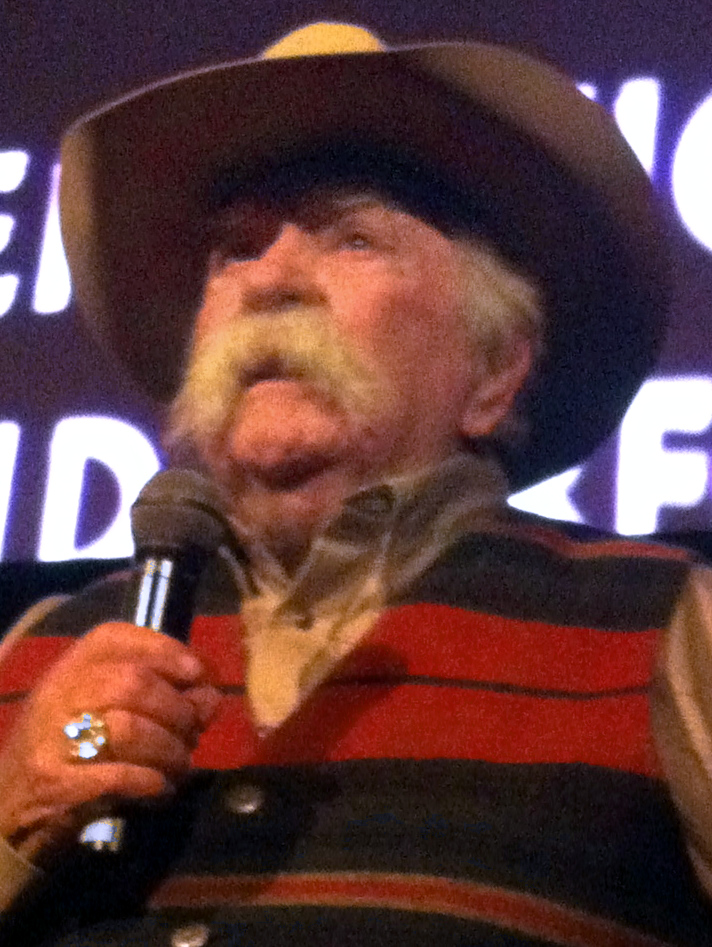
Wilford Brimley

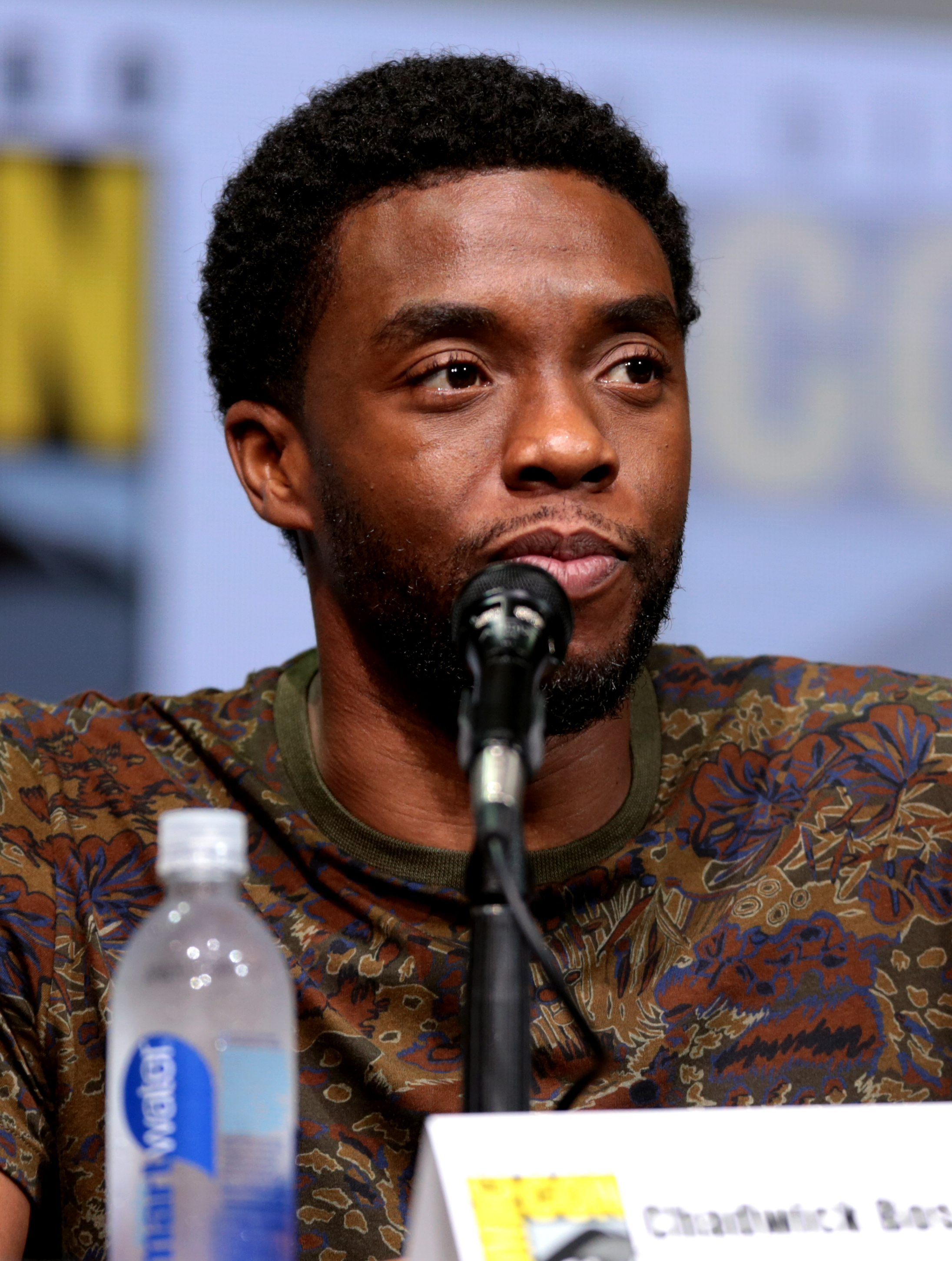
Chadwick Boseman

- August 1 – Wilford Brimley, actor and singer (b. 1934)
- August 2 – Leon Fleisher, American pianist (b. 1928)
- August 3 – Shirley Ann Grau, American writer (b. 1929)
- August 4 – Frances Allen, American computer scientist (b. 1932)
- August 5 – Eric Bentley, English-born American theater critic and playwright (b. 1916)
- August 6 – Brent Scowcroft, American diplomat (b. 1925)
- August 9 – Kamala, American professional wrestler (b. 1950)
- August 11
  - Russell Kirsch, American computer scientist (b. 1929)
  - Trini Lopez, American singer and actor (b. 1937)
  - Sumner Redstone, American media executive (b. 1923)
- August 12 – Marvin Creamer, American sailor (b. 1916)
- August 15 – Robert Trump, younger brother of Donald Trump (b. 1948)
- August 16 – Xavier, wrestler (b. 1977)
- August 18 – Jack Sherman, American guitarist (b. 1956)
- August 23 – Lori Nelson, American actress and model (b. 1933)
- August 26
  - Gerald Carr, American astronaut and aeronautical engineer (b. 1932)
  - Joe Ruby, American animator, co-creator of Scooby-Doo (b. 1933)
- August 28 – Chadwick Boseman, actor (b. 1976)
- August 29 – Clifford Robinson, American basketball player (b. 1966)
- August 31 – Tom Seaver, American baseball player (b. 1944)

=== September ===
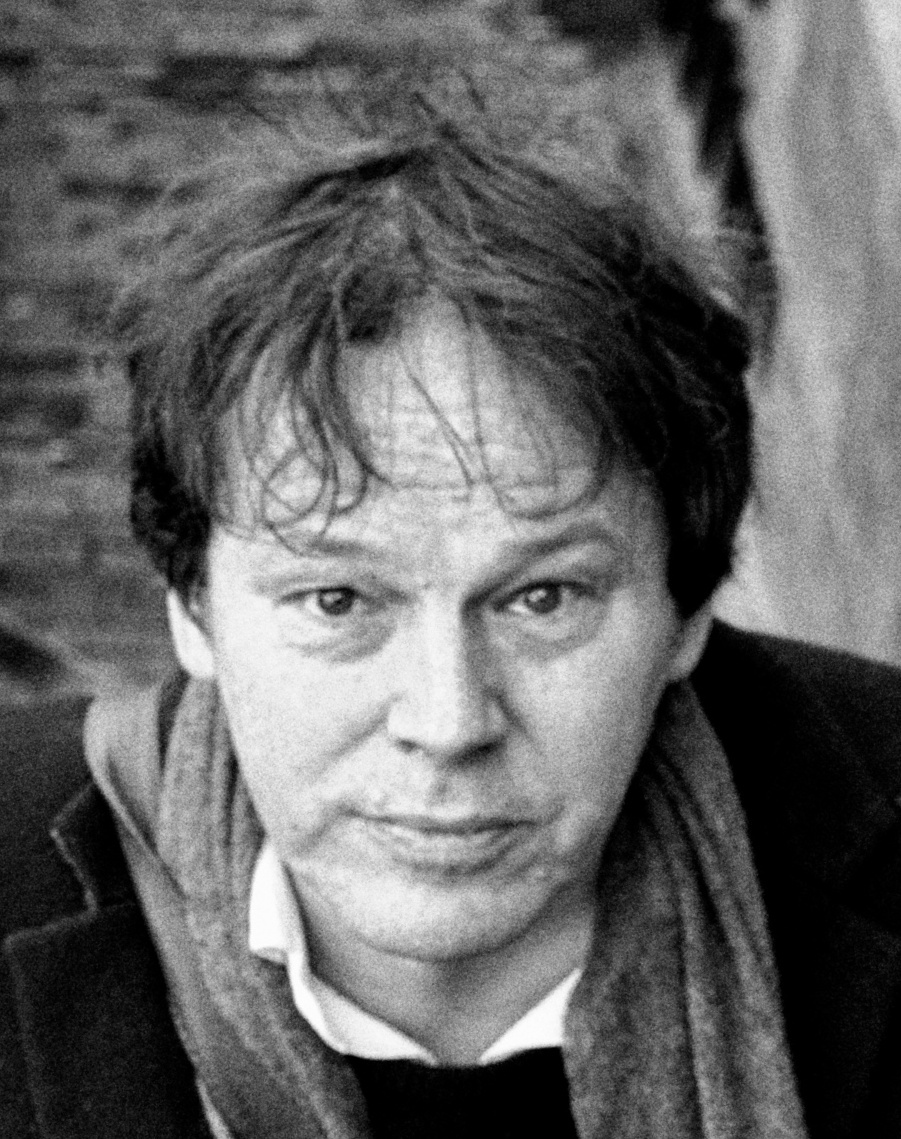
David Graeber

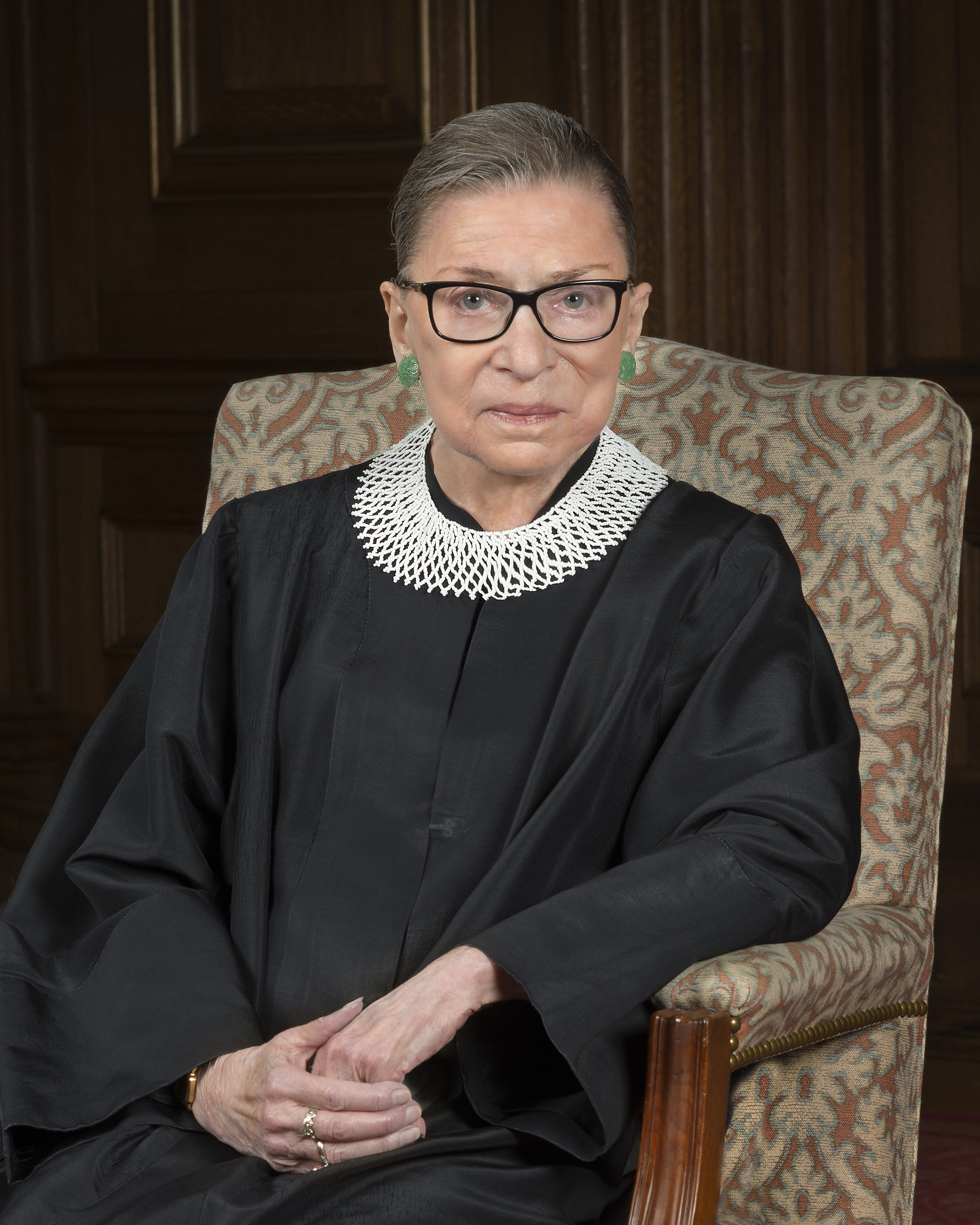
Ruth Bader Ginsburg

- September 1 – Erick Morillo, Colombian-American DJ and music producer (b. 1971)
- September 2 – David Graeber, American anthropologist and anarchist author (b. 1961)
- September 4 – Gary Peacock, American jazz double-bassist (b. 1935)
- September 6 – Lou Brock, American baseball player (b. 1939)
- September 14 – Bill Gates Sr., American attorney and philanthropist (b. 1926).
- September 17
  - Terry Goodkind, American novelist (b. 1948)
  - Winston Groom, American novelist (b. 1943)
- September 18
  - Stephen F. Cohen, American academic and historian (b. 1938)
  - Ruth Bader Ginsburg, jurist (Supreme Court of the United States) (b. 1933)
- September 20 – Michael Chapman, American cinematographer and film director (b. 1935)
- September 21
  - Arthur Ashkin, American Nobel physicist (b. 1922)
  - Tommy DeVito, American musician and singer (b. 1928)
  - Jackie Stallone, American astrologer, dancer, promoter and businesswoman (b. 1921)
- September 22 – Road Warrior Animal, American professional wrestler (b. 1960)
- September 23
  - Sir Harold Evans, English-American journalist (The Sunday Times, The Week, The Guardian) and author (b. 1928)
  - Gale Sayers, American Hall of Fame football player (b. 1943)
- September 29
  - Mac Davis, country singer, songwriter, and actor (b. 1942)
  - Helen Reddy, singer, songwriter, and actor (b. 1941)

=== October ===
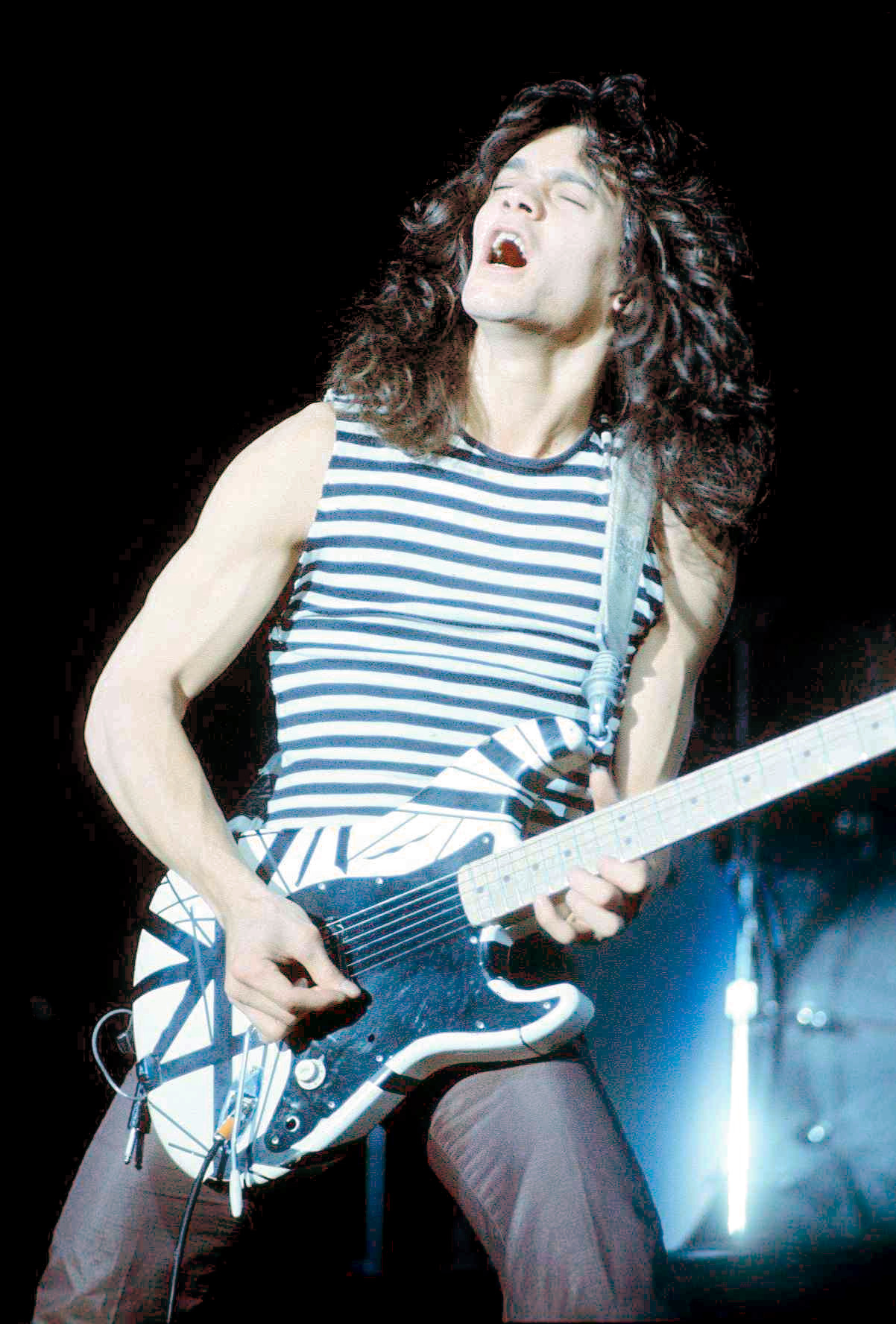
Eddie Van Halen

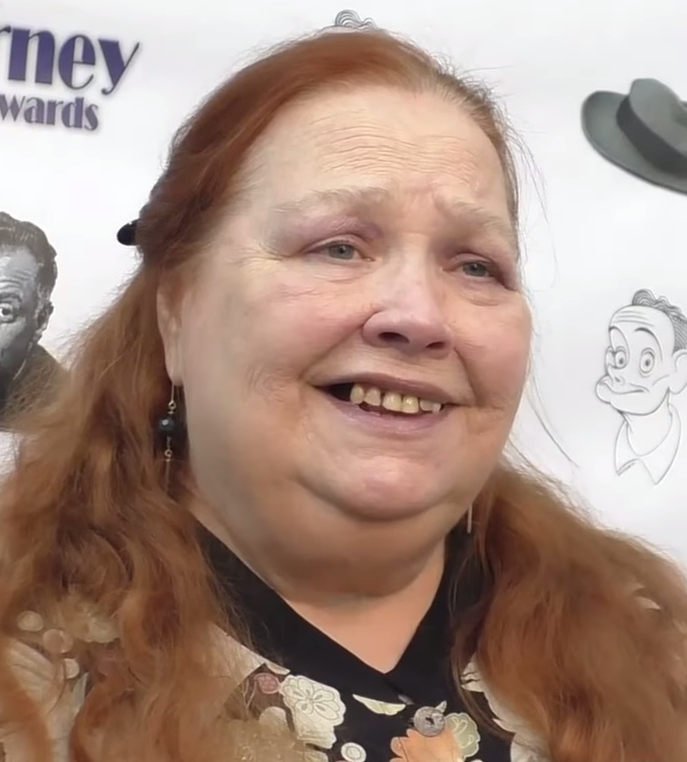
Conchata Ferrell

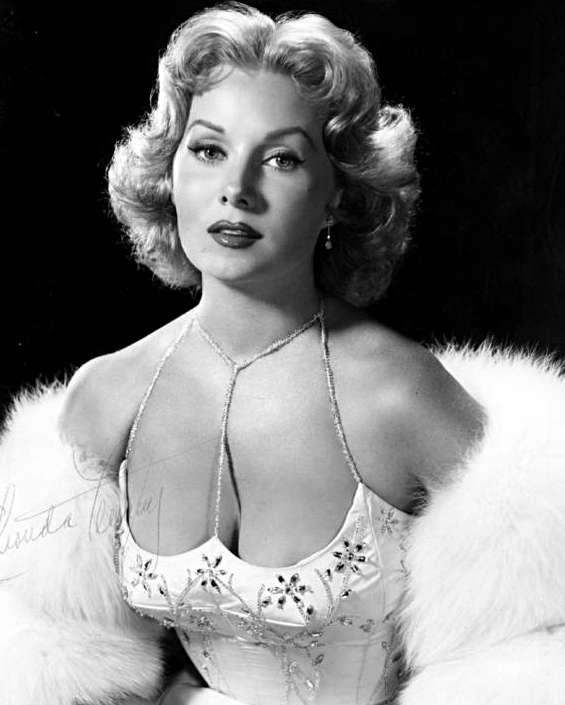
Rhonda Fleming

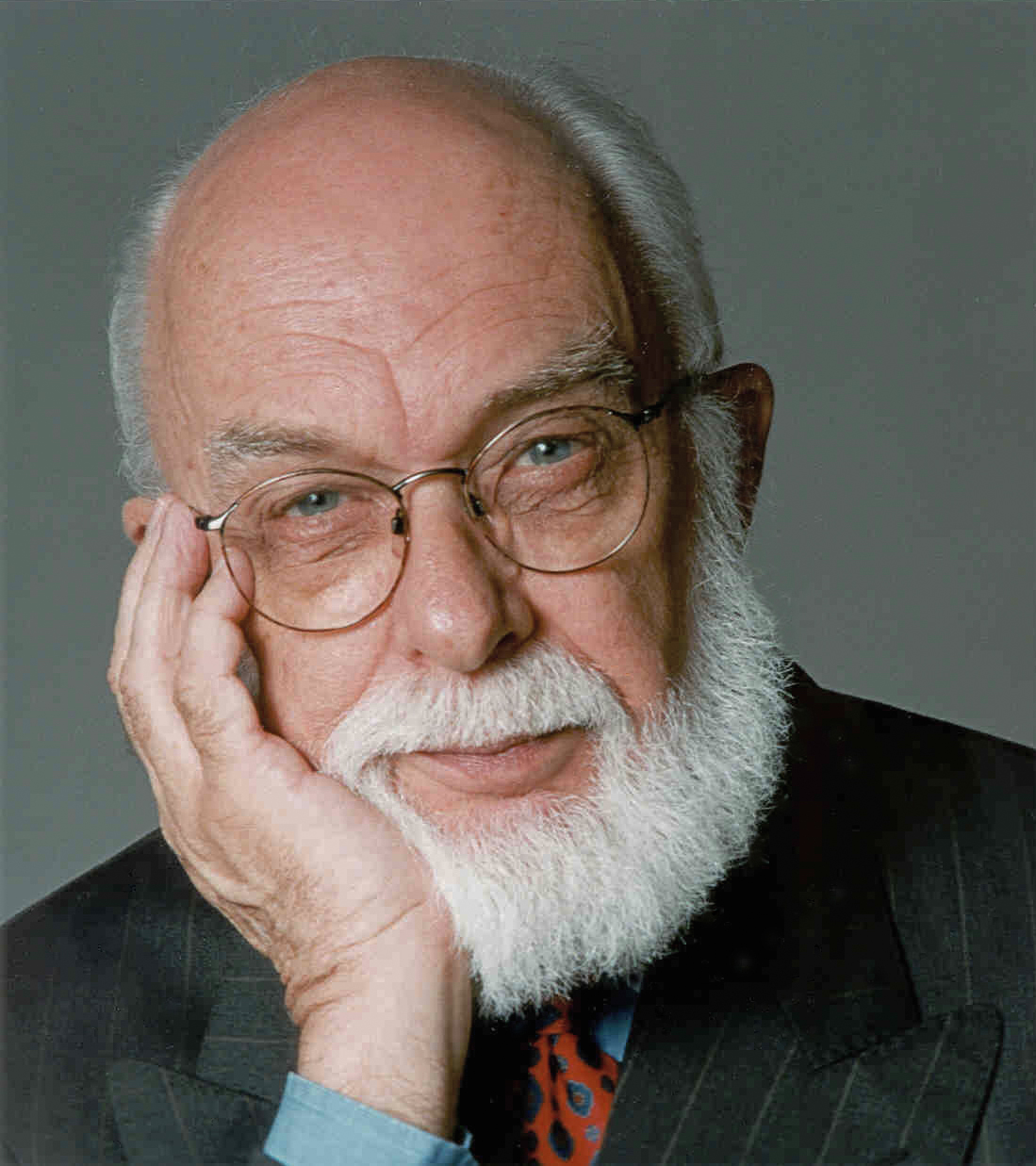
James Randi

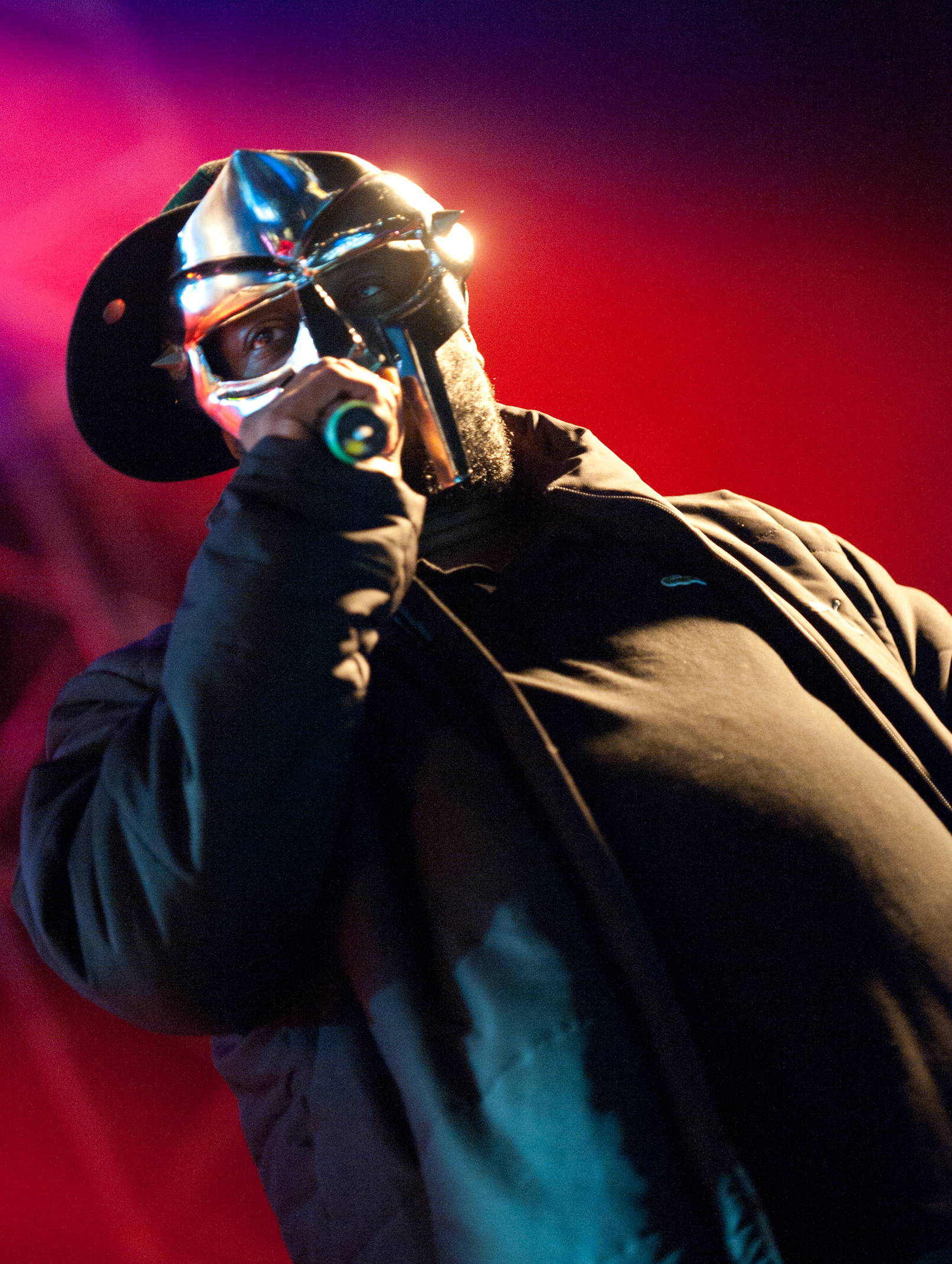
MF Doom

- October 2 – Bob Gibson, American baseball player (b. 1935)
- October 3 – Charlie Haeger, American baseball player (b. 1983)
- October 6
  - Johnny Nash, singer-songwriter (b. 1940)
  - Eddie Van Halen, Dutch-American musician and songwriter (b. 1955)
- October 8
  - Whitey Ford, American baseball player (b. 1928)
  - Charles Moore, American athlete (b. 1929)
- October 11
  - Joe Morgan, American baseball player (b. 1943)
  - Donald Pellmann, American masters athlete (b. 1915)
- October 12
  - Conchata Ferrell, American actress (b. 1943)
  - Roberta McCain, socialite and mother of John McCain (b. 1912)
- October 14 – Rhonda Fleming, American actress (b. 1923)
- October 16 – John Henderson, American football player (b. 1912)
- October 20 – James Randi, Canadian-American magician and skeptic (b. 1928)
- October 21
  - Marge Champion, American dancer and actress (b. 1919)
  - Viola Smith, American drummer (b. 1912)
- October 23 – Jerry Jeff Walker, American singer-songwriter (b. 1942)
- October 25 – Diane di Prima, American poet (b. 1934)
- October 28 – Leanza Cornett, model (Miss America 1993), TV host and actress (b. 1971)
- October 29 – Angelika Amon, Austrian-American molecular and cell biologist (b. 1967)
- October 31 – MF Doom, British-born American rapper and record producer (b. 1971)

=== November ===
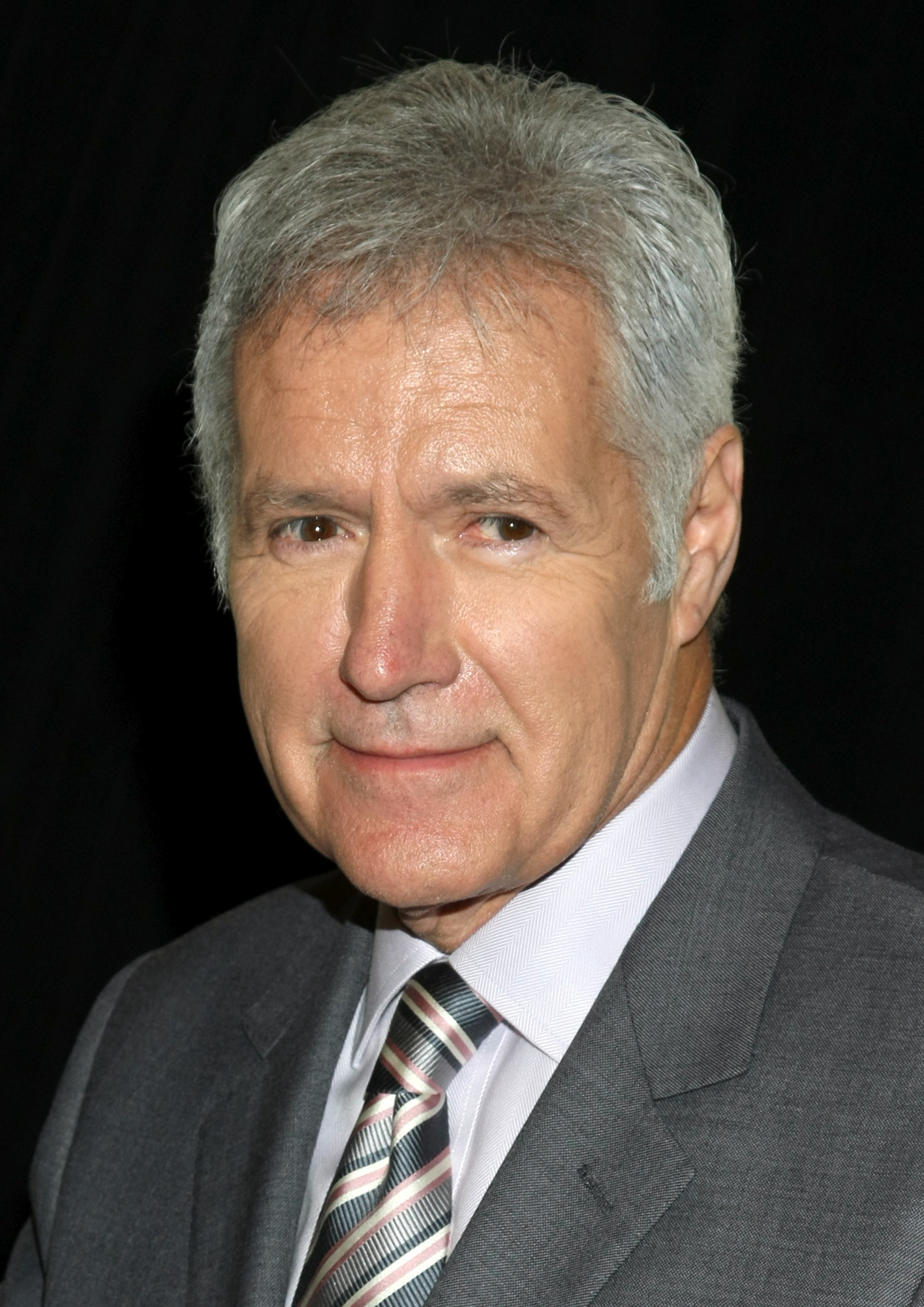
Alex Trebek

- November 1
  - Carol Arthur, actress (b. 1935)
  - Nikki McKibbin, finalist on American Idol (b. 1978)
- November 2 – Robert Sam Anson, journalist and author (b. 1945)
- November 3 – Elsa Raven, actress (b. 1929)
- November 4 –
  - Tom Metzger, politician, white supremacist, neo-Nazi leader and Klansman (b. 1938)
  - John Meyer, football player and coach (b. 1942)
- November 5 – Len Barry, singer (b. 1942)
- November 6
  - Ken Spears, writer (b. 1938)
  - King Von, rapper (b. 1994)
- November 7 – Norm Crosby, actor and comedian (b. 1927)
- November 8 – Alex Trebek, Canadian-born game show host (Jeopardy!) (b. 1940)
- November 10 – Tom Heinsohn, Hall of Fame basketball player, coach, and broadcaster (b. 1934)
- November 13 – Roger Jepsen, American politician (b. 1928)
- November 17 – Walt Davis, American athlete (b. 1931)
- November 23
  - Abby Dalton, American actress (b. 1932)
  - David Dinkins, American politician, lawyer, and author (b. 1927)
  - Hal Ketchum, American country singer-songwriter (b. 1953)
- November 27 – Tony Hsieh, Internet entrepreneur (b. 1973)

=== December ===
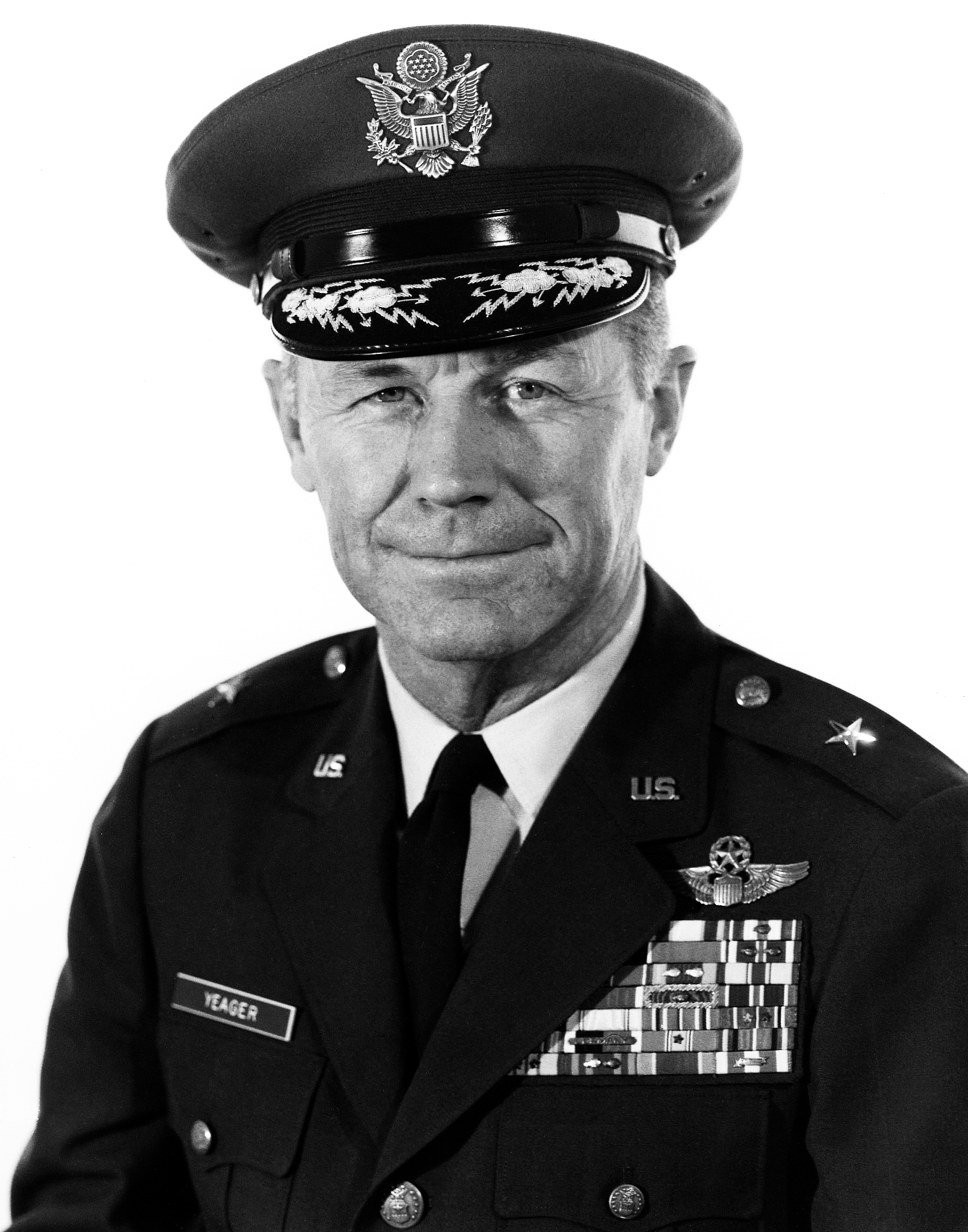
Chuck Yeager

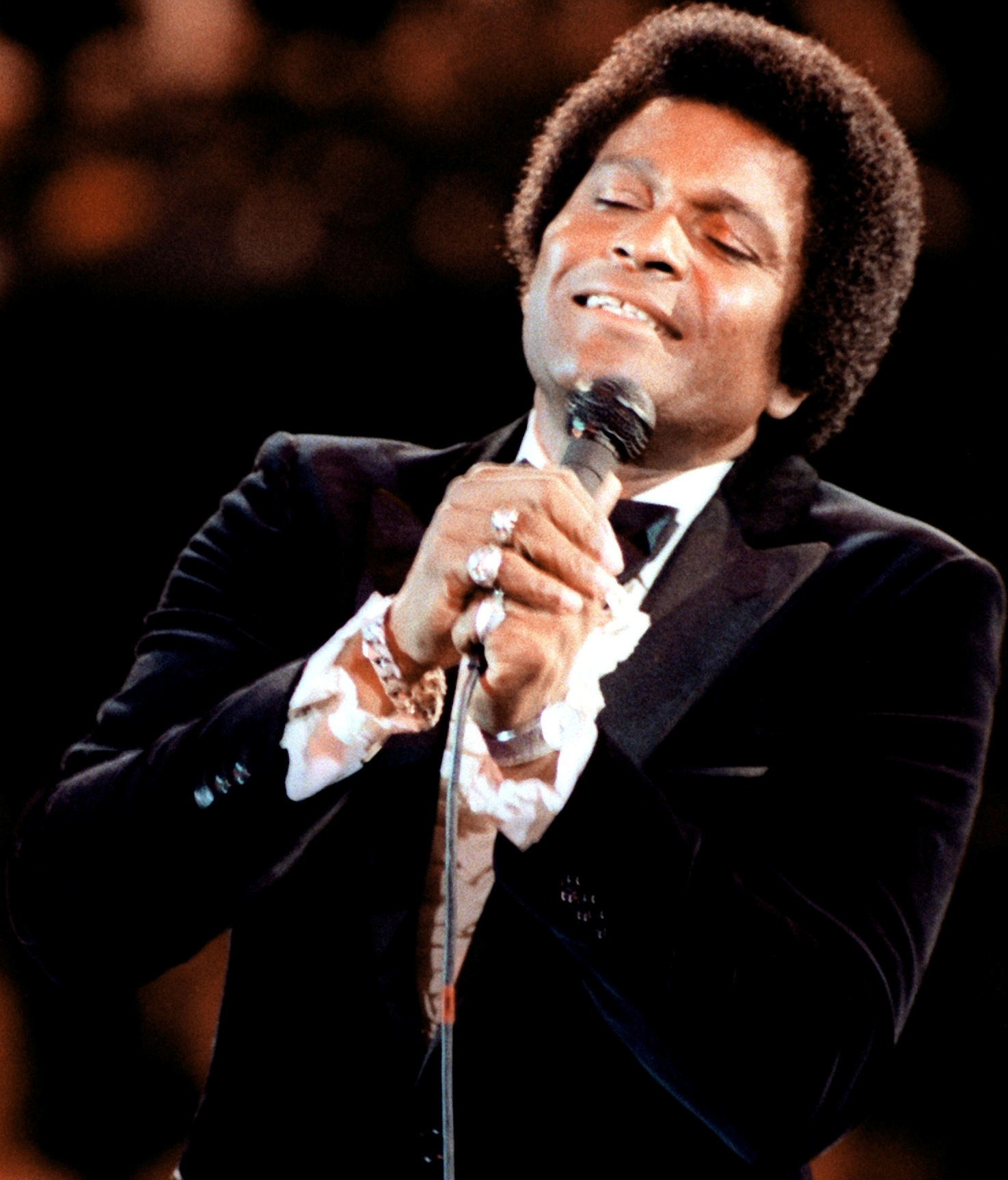
Charley Pride

- December 1 – Arnie Robinson, American athlete (b. 1948)
- December 2
  - Rafer Johnson, American athlete (b. 1935)
  - Pat Patterson, Canadian-born American wrestler (b. 1941)
  - Pamela Tiffin, American actress and model (b. 1942)
- December 4 – David Lander, American actor (Laverne & Shirley) (b. 1947)
- December 5 – Martin Sandoval, politician (b. 1964)
- December 6 – Paul Sarbanes, American politician and attorney (b. 1933)
- December 7
  - Chuck Yeager, first pilot to break the sound barrier (b. 1923)
  - Natalie Desselle-Reid, actress (b. 1967)
- December 9 – Ray Perkins, American football player and coach (b. 1941)
- December 10
  - Tommy Lister Jr., actor and professional wrestler (b. 1958)
  - Brandon Bernard, murderer (b. 1980)
- December 12 – Charley Pride, American singer, musician and guitarist (b. 1934)
- December 16 – Lorenzo Taliaferro, football player (b. 1991)
- December 17 – Richard Burchell, politician (b. 1943)
- December 20 – Ezra Vogel, American sociologist (b. 1930)
- December 21 – Kevin Greene, hall of fame football player (b. 1962)
- December 22 – Leslie West, guitarist and songwriter (b. 1945)
- December 23 – Frankie Randall, boxer (b. 1961)
- December 25 – Barry Lopez, author (b. 1945)
- December 26
  - Brodie Lee, professional wrestler and actor (b. 1979)
  - John Sedensky, politician (b. 1935)
- December 29 – Joe Louis Clark, educator (b. 1938)
- December 30 – Samuel Little, American serial killer; the confirmed most prolific serial killer U.S. history (b. 1940)
- December 31 – Dick Thornburgh, Governor of Pennsylvania (1979–1987) and United States Attorney General (1988–1991) (b. 1932)

== See also ==
- 2020 in United States politics and government
- 2020 United States presidential election
- 2020 in politics and government
- 2020 in American music
- 2020 in American soccer
- 2020 in American television
- List of American films of 2020

=== Country overviews ===
- United States
- History of United States
- History of modern United States
- Outline of United States
- Government of United States
- Politics of United States
- Years in United States
- Timeline of United States history

=== Related timelines for current period ===
- 2020
- 2020s
- 2020s in political history
- 2020s in United States political history
- 2020 in New York City

=== Specific situations and issues ===
- First impeachment of Donald Trump
- COVID-19 pandemic in the United States
- George Floyd protests
- 2020 United States Postal Service crisis
- 2020–2021 United States racial unrest
