= Deaths in January 2020 =

The following is a list of notable deaths in January 2020.

Entries for each day are listed alphabetically by surname. A typical entry lists information in the following sequence:

- Name, age, country of citizenship at birth, subsequent country of citizenship (if applicable), reason for notability, cause of death (if known), and reference.

== January 2020 ==
=== 1 ===
- János Aczél, 95, Hungarian-Canadian mathematician.
- Lexii Alijai, 21, American rapper, drug and alcohol overdose.
- Chris Barker, 39, English footballer (Barnsley, Cardiff City, Southend United), suicide.
- Joan Benson, 94, American keyboard player.
- Aleksandr Aleksandrovich Blagonravov, 86, Russian scientist.
- George W. Blair, 98, American politician, member of the South Dakota House of Representatives (1979–1986).
- Marius Bruat, 89, French footballer.
- Günter Brümmer, 86, German canoeist.
- Martin Bundi, 87, Swiss politician, president of the National Council (1985–1986).
- Frank L. Clarke, 86, Australian business economist.
- Carlos De León, 60, Puerto Rican boxer, WBC cruiserweight champion (1980–1982, 1983–1985, 1986–1988, 1989–1990), heart attack.
- Alexander Frater, 82, British-Australian travel writer and journalist.
- Marty Grebb, 73, American musician (The Buckinghams).
- Tommy Hancock, 90, American musician.
- Doug Hart, 80, American football player (Green Bay Packers).
- Walter Hayman, 93, German-born British mathematician.
- Jiao Ruoyu, 104, Chinese politician and diplomat, Mayor of Beijing (1981–1983), Ambassador to Peru (1972–1977) and Iran (1977–1979).
- Les Josephson, 77, American football player (Los Angeles Rams) and actor (Heaven Can Wait).
- Don Larsen, 90, American baseball player (New York Yankees, Baltimore Orioles, San Francisco Giants), esophageal cancer.
- Bengt Levin, 61, Swedish orienteer, world championship silver medalist (1981).
- Peter Lo Su Yin, 96, Malaysian politician, Chief Minister of Sabah (1965–1967).
- Aleksandr Manachinsky, 61, Ukrainian Olympic swimmer (1976).
- Jim Manning, 76, American baseball player (Minnesota Twins).
- Barry McDonald, 79, Australian rugby union player (national team).
- Roland Minson, 90, American basketball player (BYU Cougars).
- Jimmy Moran, 84, Scottish footballer (Norwich City, Northampton Town, Workington).
- Peter Neumann, 88, Canadian football player (Hamilton Tiger-Cats).
- Ng Jui Ping, 71, Singaporean entrepreneur and army general, Chief of Defence Force (1992–1995), pancreatic cancer.
- Chris Pattikawa, 79, Indonesian film director and producer.
- Jaap Schröder, 94, Dutch violinist and conductor.
- Dick Scott, 96, New Zealand historian.
- Katsura Shinnosuke, 66, Japanese rakugoka, acute myeloid leukemia.
- David Stern, 77, American sports executive and lawyer, commissioner of the National Basketball Association (1984–2014), brain hemorrhage.
- Silva Zurleva, 61, Bulgarian journalist, heart attack.

=== 2 ===
- John Baldessari, 88, American conceptual artist.
- Fazilatunnesa Bappy, 49, Bangladeshi lawyer and politician, MP (2011–2018), pneumonia.
- Daitari Behera, 81, Indian politician, MLA (1974–1977 and 1995–2000).
- Tom Buck, 81, American politician, member of the Georgia House of Representatives (1966–2004).
- Michel Celaya, 89, French rugby player (national team).
- Lorraine Chandler, 73, American singer and songwriter.
- Chen Suhou, 83, Chinese politician, Vice Governor of Hainan (1990–1997), Vice Chairman of the Hainan Provincial People's Congress (1997–2003).
- Marie Clarke, 104, American labor leader.
- Auxence Contout, 94, French Guianese writer.
- Mohamed Salah Dembri, 81, Algerian politician, Minister of Foreign Affairs (1993–1996).
- R. Kern Eutsler, 100, American United Methodist Church bishop.
- Marian Finucane, 69, Irish broadcaster (Liveline, The Marian Finucane Show).
- Nick Fish, 61, American politician and lawyer, Portland city commissioner (since 2008), stomach cancer.
- Veronika Fitz, 83, German actress (The Vulture Wally, The Spessart Inn, Oh! This Bavaria!).
- Bill Graham, 84, Canadian football player (Hamilton Tiger-Cats).
- Robert M. Graham, 90, American computer scientist.
- Terry Gray, 81, Canadian ice hockey player (St. Louis Blues, Los Angeles Kings).
- Edward A. Grouby Jr., 92, American politician, Alabama state representative (1978–1990).
- Luciana Guindani, 82, Italian Olympic sprint canoer.
- Tom Hickey, 86, Canadian politician, member of the Newfoundland and Labrador House of Assembly (1966–1986).
- Houston Hogg, 71, American football player.
- Fernando Lecuona, 93, Cuban Olympic gymnast.
- Raymond K. Mason, 92, American businessman.
- Gale McArthur, 90, American basketball player (Oklahoma State Cowboys).
- Bruce McEwen, 81, American neuroendocrinologist.
- Jack McGuire, 86, American politician, member of the Illinois House of Representatives (1990–2012).
- Yukiko Miyake, 54, Japanese politician, member of the House of Representatives (2009–2012), suicide by drowning.
- Roman Monchenko, 55, Russian rower, Olympic bronze medallist (1996).
- George Nicolau, 94, American arbitrator, MLB (1985–1995), NHL (1993–1996), NBA (1979–1981), president of NAA.
- Bogusław Polch, 78, Polish artist.
- Herbert Preudhomme, 88, Grenadian politician, Deputy Prime Minister of Grenada (1974-1979).
- Najwa Qassem, 52, Lebanese journalist and television presenter (Al Arabiya), heart attack.
- Élisabeth Rappeneau, 84, French film director (J'ai peur d'oublier) and screenwriter (Lovers Like Us, Une Femme ou Deux).
- Jacques Renaud, 96, French racing cyclist.
- Ricardo Rosales, 85, Guatemalan politician, head of the Guatemalan Party of Labour (1974–1996).
- Edward Spiegel, 88, American physicist.
- Shen Yi-ming, 62, Taiwanese Air Force general officer, Chief of the General Staff (since 2019), helicopter crash.
- D. P. Tripathi, 67, Indian politician, MP (2012–2018).
- Grant Weatherstone, 88, Scottish rugby union player (Edinburgh District, national team).
- Barbara Uehling, 87, American educator and university administrator, complications from Alzheimer's disease.
- Sam Wyche, 74, American football player (Washington Redskins) and coach (Cincinnati Bengals, Tampa Bay Buccaneers), melanoma.

=== 3 ===
- Derek Acorah, 69, English self-styled spiritual medium and television personality (Most Haunted, Derek Acorah's Ghost Towns), sepsis.
- Antonis Balomenakis, 65, Greek lawyer and politician, MP (2015–2019).
- Christopher Beeny, 78, English actor (Upstairs, Downstairs, In Loving Memory, Last of the Summer Wine).
- Robert Blanche, 57, American actor (Grimm, World Trade Center, Leverage).
- Pete Brewster, 89, American football player (Cleveland Browns, Pittsburgh Steelers) and coach.
- Wolfgang Brezinka, 91, German-Austrian educational scientist.
- Ninez Cacho-Olivares, 78, Filipino journalist (Daily Tribune), heart attack.
- Mike Colsten, 70, American racing driver.
- Domenico Corcione, 90, Italian general, Minister of Defence (1995–1996).
- Gérard de Sélys, 75, Belgian journalist.
- Mónica Echeverría, 99, Chilean journalist, writer and actress.
- Ken Fuson, 63, American journalist (The Baltimore Sun, The Des Moines Register), complications from liver disease.
- James W. Hennigan Jr., 92, American politician, member of the Massachusetts House of Representatives (1953–1955) and Massachusetts Senate (1955–1965).
- Reuben Hersh, 92, American mathematician.
- Nathaël Julan, 23, French footballer (Le Havre, Valenciennes, Guingamp), traffic collision.
- M. Sakthivel Murugan, Indian politician, MLA (2001–2006), heart attack.
- Stella Maris Leverberg, 57, Argentine politician and trade unionist, Deputy (2007–2015), traffic collision.
- Penny Morrell, 81, British actress (A Stitch in Time, Mrs. Gibbons' Boys, The End of the Affair).
- Rameshwar Prasad, Indian politician, MLA (1980–1985), kidney disease.
- Harvey Reti, 82, Canadian Olympic boxer (1964).
- Marie Mercury Roth, 93, American synthetic organic chemist.
- Bernard Ryan Jr., 96, American writer.
- Michael Shute, 68, Canadian academic, amyotrophic lateral sclerosis.
- Yoshikazu Sunako, 87, Japanese motorcycle and racecar driver.
- Douglas N. Walton, 77, Canadian academic.
- Bo Winberg, 80, Swedish singer and guitarist.
- People killed in the Baghdad International Airport airstrike:
  - Abu Mahdi al-Muhandis, 65, Iraqi military commander, head of the Popular Mobilization Forces (since 2011).
  - Qasem Soleimani, 62, Iranian major general, commander of the Quds Force (since 1998).

=== 4 ===
- Oliver Batali Albino, 84, South Sudanese politician, heart failure.
- Guy Arnold, 87, English writer and explorer, complications from dementia.
- Sir Jack Baldwin, 81, British chemist.
- Russell Bannock, 100, Canadian fighter ace during World War II.
- Byron W. Bender, 90, American linguist.
- Herbert Binkert, 96, German football player (1. FC Saarbrücken, Saarland national team) and manager (FC 08 Homburg).
- Emanuel Borok, 75, Soviet-born American violinist (Boston Symphony Orchestra, Boston Pops, Dallas Symphony Orchestra), teacher and concertmaster, lung cancer.
- Bonnie Burstow, 74, Canadian psychotherapist.
- Júlio Castro Caldas, 76, Portuguese lawyer and politician, MP (1980–1983), Minister of National Defence (1999–2001).
- Marie-Thérèse Cheroutre, 95, French historian, General Commissioner of Guides de France (1953–1979).
- John R. Cunningham, 92, Canadian medical physicist.
- Ding Xieping, 81, Chinese mathematician.
- Georges Duboeuf, 86, French vintner, stroke.
- Károly Gesztesi, 56, Hungarian actor (A Kind of America, The District!, Children of Glory), heart attack.
- Emilio Giletti, 90, Italian racing driver.
- Gugum Gumbira, 74, Indonesian gamelan composer and orchestra leader.
- John W. Hasper, 84, American politician, member of the New York State Assembly (1987–1992).
- Junko Hirotani, 63, Japanese singer, breast cancer.
- Bill Hobbs, 70, American rower, Olympic silver medalist (1972).
- Jiang Hongde, 77, Chinese engineer.
- Tom Long, 51, American-born Australian actor (Two Hands, The Dish, The Postcard Bandit), encephalitis.
- Lorenza Mazzetti, 92, Italian film director (Together) and novelist.
- James Parks Morton, 89, American Episcopal priest and founder of Interfaith Center of New York.
- K. S. S. Nambooripad, 84, Indian mathematician, academic and computer scientist.
- Martha Elizabeth Newton, 78, British bryologist and botanist.
- Walter Ormeño, 93, Peruvian footballer (Club América, Atlante, national team).
- P. H. Pandian, 74, Indian politician, MP (1999–2004), heart disease.
- Puerto Plata, 96, Dominican musician.
- Zdravko Tomac, 82, Croatian politician and writer, MP (1995–2005).
- Galia Yishai, 69, Israeli actress and singer, cancer.
- Ben Verhagen, 93, Dutch Olympic sailor.
- Kiyoshi Yoshimoti, 71, Japanese swordsman.

=== 5 ===
- Rubén Almanza, 90, Mexican Olympic basketball player (1952).
- James Barber, 79, British biochemist.
- T. N. Chaturvedi, 90, Indian civil servant, Governor of Karnataka (2002–2007) and Kerala (2004).
- Charlie Cook, 78, American professional wrestler (NWA).
- Peter Dyck, 73, Canadian politician, MLA (1995–2011), complications of progressive supranuclear palsy.
- Betty Pat Gatliff, 89, American forensic artist, stroke.
- Maciej Górski, 75, Polish diplomat, ambassador to Italy (1996–2001) and Greece (2005–2006).
- Colin Howson, 74–75, British philosopher.
- Guri Ingebrigtsen, 67, Norwegian politician, mayor of Vestvågøy Municipality (1999–2007) and Minister of Social Affairs (2000–2001), cancer.
- Anri Jergenia, 78, Abkhazian politician, Prime Minister (2001–2002).
- Walter Learning, 81, Canadian actor, director and producer, founder of Theatre New Brunswick.
- Liu Zhongyi, 89, Chinese politician, Minister of Agriculture (1990–1993).
- Danny Masterton, 65, Scottish footballer (Ayr United, Clyde).
- John Migneault, 70, Canadian ice hockey player (Philadelphia Blazers, Vancouver Blazers, Phoenix Roadrunners), cancer.
- Antoni Morell Mora, 78, Spanish-born Andorran diplomat and writer, ambassador to the Holy See (2005–2010), heart failure.
- Sylvia Jukes Morris, 84, British biographer.
- Charles Oguk, 55, Kenyan Olympic hockey player.
- Issiaka Ouattara, 53, Ivorian rebel general (First Ivorian Civil War).
- Ana Maria Primavesi, 99, Austrian-Brazilian agronomist.
- Kamal Singh, 93, Indian politician, MP (1952–1962).
- Sir Michael Stear, 81, British Royal Air Force air chief marshal.
- Mien Sugandhi, 85, Indonesian politician, member of the People's Representative Council (1977–1993).
- Hans Tilkowski, 84, German football player (Westfalia Herne, Borussia Dortmund, West Germany national team) and manager.
- Bjørn Unneberg, 91, Norwegian politician.
- Peter Wertheimer, 72, Romanian-Israeli flautist, saxophonist and clarinetist, cancer.
- David Albin Zywiec Sidor, 72, American-Nicaraguan Roman Catholic prelate, Bishop of Siuna (since 2017), brain tumour.

=== 6 ===
- Bernt Andersson, 86, Swedish football player (Djurgården) and manager (Halmstad, Helsingborg).
- Timoshenko Aslanides, 76, Australian poet.
- John Brownjohn, 90, British literary translator.
- Ray Byrom, 85, English footballer (Accrington Stanley, Bradford (Park Avenue)).
- Cabeção, 89, Brazilian footballer (Corinthians, Portuguesa, national team).
- Sir George Cooper, 94, British general, Adjutant-General to the Forces (1981–1984).
- Michel Didisheim, 89, Belgian aristocrat and royal secretary.
- Duncan Dowson, 91, British engineer.
- Mike Fitzpatrick, 56, American politician, member of the U.S. House of Representatives (2005–2007, 2011–2017), melanoma.
- Reva Gerstein, 102, Canadian psychologist, educator, and mental health advocate.
- Frank Gordon Jr., 90, American jurist, Justice (1975–1992) and Chief Justice (1987–1992) of the Arizona Supreme Court.
- Arne Holmgren, 79, Swedish biochemist.
- Prem Nath Hoon, 90, Indian military officer, General Officer Commanding-in-Chief of the Western Command (1986–1987).
- Ria Irawan, 50, Indonesian actress (Biola Tak Berdawai, Arisan!, Love for Share), lymphoma.
- Oswaldo Larriva, 74, Ecuadorian academic and politician, Governor of Azuay Province (2007–2009, 2019) and Deputy (1992–1994, 2013–2017), leukaemia.
- Richard Maponya, 99, South African property developer, owner of Maponya Mall.
- Aloïse Moudileno-Massengo, 86, Congolese politician and lawyer, Vice President (1971–1972).
- James Mehaffey, 88, Irish Anglican prelate, Bishop of Derry and Raphoe (1980–2002).
- Minati Mishra, 91, Indian classical dancer.
- Zacarías Ortiz Rolón, 85, Paraguayan Roman Catholic prelate, Bishop of Concepción en Paraguay (2003–2013).
- Akbar Padamsee, 91, Indian painter.
- John Post, 83, American philosopher.
- Ivan Salaj, 58, Serbian basketball player (Crvena zvezda).
- Jochen Schneider, 77, German Olympic sprint canoeist.
- Alejandro Trujillo, 67, Chilean footballer.

=== 7 ===
- André Abadie, 85, French rugby union player (Sporting Club Graulhetois, SC Albi).
- Raghunath Singh Anjana, 75, Indian politician, MLA (1990–1993).
- Zijad Arslanagić, 83, Bosnian footballer (Sarajevo, Tasmania Berlin, Yugoslavia national team).
- Igor Avrunin, 62, Soviet-born Israeli shot putter and discus thrower.
- Gerald Bowden, 84, British politician, MP (1983–1992).
- Vincenzo Cerundolo, 60, Italian medical researcher, lung cancer.
- Chang Chiu-hua, 83, Taiwanese politician, mayor (1973–1982) and county magistrate (1989–1993) of Miaoli, liver cancer.
- Chi Zhiqiang, 95, Chinese pharmacologist.
- Stephen Clements, 47, British radio personality (BBC Radio Ulster), suicide.
- Jacques Dessange, 94, French hairdresser.
- Liliane Dévieux-Dehoux, 77, Haitian and Canadian writer.
- Fakhruddin G. Ebrahim, 91, Pakistani judge, Attorney General (1971–1977) and Governor of Sindh (1989–1990).
- Larry Gogan, 85, Irish broadcaster (RTÉ Gold, RTÉ 2fm).
- Bruce Haywood, 94, American educator.
- Silvio Horta, 45, American film and television writer (Ugly Betty, Jake 2.0, Urban Legend), suicide by gunshot.
- C. Harry Knowles, 91, American physicist and inventor.
- Alexandre Matheron, 93, French philosopher.
- Harvey Alfred Miller, 91, American botanist.
- Jaime Monzó, 73, Spanish Olympic swimmer (1968).
- Kennedy Njiru, 32–33, Kenyan steeplechase runner, traffic collision.
- Phil O'Neill, 78, Australian politician, member of the New South Wales Legislative Assembly (1978–1984).
- Henrik Ottesen, 85, Danish Olympic boxer.
- Khamis Al-Owairan, 46, Saudi Arabian footballer (Al-Hilal, Al-Ittihad, national team), brain cancer.
- Neil Peart, 67, Canadian Hall of Fame drummer (Rush) and lyricist ("The Spirit of Radio", "Tom Sawyer"), glioblastoma.
- David Penner, 61, Canadian architect, heart attack.
- George Perles, 85, American football player and coach (Pittsburgh Steelers, Michigan State Spartans), Parkinson's disease.
- Abderrazak Rassaa, 90, Tunisian politician, Minister of Finance (1969–1971).
- Ron Rogers, 65, American cartoonist.
- Rob Ronayne, 64, New Zealand lawyer and jurist, District Court judge (since 2013).
- Fritz Hans Schweingruber, 83, Swiss dendrochronologist.
- Colin Seeley, 84, English motorcycle engineer and racer.
- Ana Lucrecia Taglioretti, 24, Paraguayan violinist.
- R. P. Ulaganambi, 81, Indian politician, MP (1971–1977).
- Patrick Welch, 71, American politician, member of the Illinois Senate (1983–2005), complications from a stroke.
- Elizabeth Wurtzel, 52, American author (Prozac Nation), LMD as a complication of breast cancer.

=== 8 ===
- Haskel Ayers, 83, American auctioneer and politician, member of the Tennessee House of Representatives (1967–1968).
- Edd Byrnes, 87, American actor (77 Sunset Strip, Grease) and recording artist ("Kookie, Kookie (Lend Me Your Comb)").
- Rollie Cook, 85, Canadian football player (Edmonton Eskimos).
- Anthony Crickmay, 81, British dance photographer.
- Pat Dalton, 77, Australian footballer (Perth).
- Boken Ete, 97, Indian politician, MLA (1978–1980).
- Buck Henry, 89, American actor, screenwriter (The Graduate, Get Smart) and director (Heaven Can Wait), heart attack.
- Peter T. Kirstein, 86, British computer scientist, brain tumour.
- John Lysak, 105, American Olympic canoer.
- Madan Mohan, 74, Indian cricketer (Kerala).
- David Montgomery, 2nd Viscount Montgomery of Alamein, 91, British peer and businessman, member of the House of Lords (1976–1999, 2005–2015).
- Infanta Pilar, Duchess of Badajoz, 83, Spanish royal, Grandee of Spain, colon cancer.
- Christine Præsttun, 48, Norwegian television presenter, cancer.
- Bill Ray, 83, American photojournalist (Life), heart attack.
- Kevin Thompson, 58, American karateka, amyotrophic lateral sclerosis.
- Miklós Vető, 83, Hungarian-born French philosopher.
- Zhu Yuli, 85, Chinese politician and aerospace executive, General Manager of the Aviation Industry Corporation of China (1993–1999).

=== 9 ===
- 5th Ward Weebie, 42, American rapper, complications from heart surgery.
- Tom Alexander, 85, Scottish musician (The Alexander Brothers).
- Michael Allison, 61, American composer and musician, cancer.
- Jacques de Bauffremont, 97, French prince.
- Annette Bezor, 69, Australian painter and feminist.
- Walter J. Boyne, 90, American Air Force officer and writer (The Wild Blue: The Novel of the U.S. Air Force).
- Galen Cole, 94, American World War II veteran and philanthropist.
- Bobby Comstock, 78, American pop singer.
- Rudolf de Korte, 83, Dutch politician, Deputy Prime Minister (1986–1989), Minister of Economic Affairs (1986–1989).
- Linda Donley-Reid, 74, American museum curator, archaeologist and clinical psychologist.
- Pete Dye, 94, American Hall of Fame golf course designer (TPC at Sawgrass).
- David Efird, 45, American philosopher.
- Jack Faxon, 83, American politician, member of the Michigan House of Representatives (1965–1971) and the Michigan Senate (1971–1995).
- Pampero Firpo, 89, Argentine-American professional wrestler (NWA, WWF).
- Greg Gates, 93, American rower, Olympic bronze medalist (1948).
- David Glass, 84, American businessman, CEO of Walmart (1988–2000), owner of the Kansas City Royals (2000–2019), complications from pneumonia.
- Jo Heng, 59, Singaporean lyricist, lymphoma.
- Chukwuemeka Ike, 88, Nigerian writer.
- Kermit D. Johnson, 91, American army chaplain.
- Euphrase Kezilahabi, 75, Tanzanian novelist, poet and scholar.
- Leo Kolber, 90, Canadian politician, Senator (1983–2004), Alzheimer's disease.
- Pablo Macera, 90, Peruvian historian.
- Robert Molimard, 92, French physician.
- Roscoe Nance, 71, American sports journalist (USA Today) and beat writer (NBA, SWAC).
- Lan O'Kun, 87, American television writer (The Love Boat, Highway to Heaven, Insight), heart failure.
- Breandán Ó Madagáin, 87–88, Irish scholar, writer and Celticist.
- Ivan Passer, 86, Czech film director (Born to Win, Cutter's Way, Silver Bears) and screenwriter, pulmonary complications.
- Matthew Quashie, 68, Ghanaian naval officer.
- Phyllis Rappeport, 90, American pianist.
- Mike Resnick, 77, American science fiction writer (The Goddess of Ganymede, Stalking the Unicorn, Kirinyaga), cancer.
- Karel Saitl, 95, Czech Olympic weightlifter (1952).
- Bergljot Sandvik-Johansen, 97, Norwegian Olympic gymnast (1952).
- Jimmy Shields, 88, Northern Irish footballer (Southampton, Headington United, national team).
- Hal W. Smith, 89, American baseball player (Baltimore Orioles, Kansas City Athletics, Pittsburgh Pirates).
- Iñaki Vicente, 65, Filipino footballer (De La Salle Green Archers, national team), stroke.
- Geoff Wilson, 81, Australian nuclear physicist and academic administrator.
- Yūji Yamaguchi, Japanese anime director (The Severing Crime Edge, Fate/stay night, Angel Links). (death announced on this date)
- Yong Pung How, 93, Singaporean judge, Chief Justice (1990–2006).

=== 10 ===
- Brice Armstrong, 84, American voice actor (Dragon Ball, Case Closed, Barney & Friends).
- Neda Arnerić, 66, Serbian actress (Shaft in Africa, Venom, The End of the War).
- Qaboos bin Said, 79, Omani royal, Sultan (since 1970), colon cancer.
- Marino Bollini, 86, Sammarinese politician, captain regent (1979, 1984–1985, 1995, 1999–2000).
- André Capron, 89, French immunologist.
- Alun Gwynne Jones, Baron Chalfont, 100, British politician, Minister of State for Foreign Affairs (1964–1970) and member of the House of Lords (1964–2015).
- John Crosbie, 88, Canadian politician, MHA (1966–1976), MP (1976–1993), Lieutenant Governor of Newfoundland and Labrador (2008–2013).
- Wolfgang Dauner, 84, German jazz pianist and composer.
- Bud Fowler, 94, Canadian football player (Toronto Argonauts).
- Jørgen Frantzen, 84, Danish Olympic rower.
- Dante Frasnelli Tarter, 95, Italian-born Peruvian Roman Catholic prelate, Bishop of Huarí (1967–2001).
- Gopinath Gajapati, 76, Indian politician, MP (1989–1996).
- Michael Greene, 86, American actor (The Dakotas, To Live and Die in L.A.).
- Mozammel Hossain, 79, Bangladeshi politician, MP (1991–1995, 1996–2001, since 2008), kidney disease.
- Genshō Imanari, 94, Japanese academic.
- Brian James, 76, Australian rugby league player (South Sydney, St. George, national team).
- Patrick Jordan, 96, English actor (The Angry Hills, The Marked One, Star Wars).
- Bernard Joly, 85, French politician, Senator (1995–2004).
- Roddy Lumsden, 53, Scottish poet, heart attack.
- Guido Messina, 89, Italian racing cyclist, Olympic (1952) and world champion (1948, 1953, 1954, 1955, 1956).
- P. T. Mohana Krishnan, 84, Indian politician, MLA (1987–1991).
- Marc Morgan, 57, Belgian singer-songwriter.
- Michael Posluns, 78, Canadian writer and activist.
- Petko Petkov, 73, Bulgarian football player (Beroe, Austria Wien, national team) and manager.
- Carlos Cuco Rojas, 65, Colombian harpist (Cimarrón).
- Jean-Pierre Souche, 92, French Olympic rower (1948, 1952).
- Ed Sprague Sr., 74, American baseball player (Oakland Athletics, Milwaukee Brewers, Cincinnati Reds).
- Tiny White, 95, New Zealand equestrian.
- Russell Wayt, 77, American football player (Dallas Cowboys).
- Wu Shuqing, 88, Chinese economist, President of Peking University (1989–1996).

=== 11 ===
- Ahmed Ali, 87, Bangladeshi politician, prostate cancer.
- Tom Belsø, 77, Danish motor racing driver, stomach cancer.
- Sabine Deitmer, 72, German crime writer.
- Jean-René Farthouat, 85, French lawyer and Legion of Honour recipient.
- Alana Filippi, 59, French singer and songwriter.
- Thomas F. Goldsmith, 80, American politician.
- Musharraf Karim, 74, Bangladeshi writer.
- Stan Kirsch, 51, American actor (Highlander: The Series), suicide by hanging.
- La Parka, 54, Mexican professional wrestler (AAA), kidney failure after wrestling injury.
- Norma Michaels, 95, American actress (The King of Queens, Mind of Mencia, Easy A).
- Manfred Moore, 69, American football (San Francisco 49ers, Minnesota Vikings) and rugby league (Newtown Jets) player.
- Valdir de Moraes, 88, Brazilian football player (Palmeiras, national team) and manager, multiple organ failure.
- M. Chidananda Murthy, 88, Indian historian.
- Edward Pinkowski, 103, American writer, journalist, and historian.
- Fernanda Pires da Silva, 93, Portuguese businesswoman.
- Steve Stiles, 76, American cartoonist and writer, cancer.
- Hilarion Vendégou, 78, French politician, High Chief of the Isle of Pines (since 1974) and mayor of L'Île-des-Pins (since 1989).
- Maceo Woods, 87, American gospel musician and organist.

=== 12 ===
- Carlo Azzini, 84, Italian racing cyclist.
- Jack Baskin, 100, American philanthropist, engineer, and businessman.
- William Bogert, 83, American actor (WarGames, Small Wonder, The Greatest American Hero).
- Jackie Brown, 84, Scottish boxer, Commonwealth Games champion (1958), British and Commonwealth flyweight champion (1962–1963).
- Brian Clifton, 85, English footballer (Southampton, Grimsby Town, Boston United).
- Shlomo Eckstein, 91, Israeli economist and President of Bar-Ilan University (1992–1996).
- Mary Evelyn Fredenburg, 97, American nurse and missionary.
- Tony Garnett, 83, British film producer (Kes, Earth Girls Are Easy).
- Paulo Gonçalves, 40, Portuguese motorcycle rally racer, race crash.
- Robert Heinich, 96, American designer and writer.
- Murad Wilfried Hofmann, 88, German diplomat and author, Ambassador to Algeria (1987–1990) and Morocco (1990–1994).
- Rolf Koschorrek, 64, German politician, MP (2005–2013), cancer.
- Maurice Kujur, 84, Indian politician, MP (1984–1989).
- Francis MacNutt, 94, American priest.
- Jayalath Manoratne, 71, Sri Lankan actor (Doo Daruwo, Handaya, Sooriya Arana), brain cancer.
- Frank Nervik, 85, Norwegian footballer (Brage, Fredrikstad, national team).
- Marc Riolacci, 74, French football director, President of Ligue corse de football.
- Kazuo Sakurada, 71, Japanese rikishi, professional wrestler (Stampede Wrestling, CWF, BJPW) and trainer, cardiac arrhythmia.
- C. Robert Sarcone, 94, American politician, member of the New Jersey General Assembly (1960–1964) and Senate (1964–1966).
- Dick Schnittker, 91, American basketball player (Minneapolis Lakers).
- Sir Roger Scruton, 75, British philosopher and author (How to Be a Conservative), editor of The Salisbury Review (1982–2001), lung cancer.
- Aart Staartjes, 81, Dutch actor (De Stratemakeropzeeshow, Sesamstraat, Pinkeltje) and television presenter, traffic collision.

=== 13 ===
- Demetri Callas, 77, American guitarist (The Four Seasons), heart failure.
- Jean Delumeau, 96, French historian.
- Carlos Girón, 65, Mexican diver, Olympic silver medalist (1980), pneumonia.
- Jaime Humberto Hermosillo, 77, Mexican film director (Homework).
- Edmund Ironside, 2nd Baron Ironside, 95, British hereditary peer, naval officer and businessman.
- Andrew Kashita, 87, Zambian politician, MP (1974–1975, 1991–1996), Minister of Mines and Industry (1973–1975) and Transport and Communications (1991–1994).
- Sophie Kratzer, 30, German Olympic ice hockey player (2014), cancer.
- Pierre Lacoste, 95, French admiral, Chief of Directorate-General for External Security (1982–1985).
- André Lufwa, 94, Congolese sculptor.
- Manmohan Mahapatra, 68, Indian film director (Neeraba Jhada, Klanta Aparahna) and screenwriter.
- David Scott Milton, 85, American author and playwright.
- Digby Moran, 71, Australian Aboriginal artist.
- Maurice Moucheraud, 86, French racing cyclist, Olympic champion (1956).
- Ștefan Petrache, 70, Moldovan singer.
- Sherwood Price, 91, American actor (The Gray Ghost, Bonanza, Ice Station Zebra).
- H. L. Richardson, 92, American politician, Member of the California State Senate (1966–1989), founder of Gun Owners of America.
- Jack D. Shanstrom, 87, American jurist, Judge (1990–2001) and Chief Judge (1996–2001) of the U.S. District Court for Montana, Parkinson's disease.
- Doug Shedden, 82, Australian politician, member of the New South Wales Legislative Assembly (1987–1999).
- Isabel-Clara Simó, 76, Spanish journalist and writer.
- Hylda Sims, 87, English folk musician and poet.
- L. Douglas Smoot, 85, American chemical engineer.
- Gerald Weisfeld, 79, British retailer, founder of What Every Woman Wants.

=== 14 ===
- Nana Akwasi Agyeman, 86, Ghanaian politician, mayor of Kumasi (1977–2001).
- Tony Beddison, 71, Australian businessman and philanthropist.
- John N. Brandenburg, 90, American lieutenant general.
- José Calle, 75, French rugby union footballer.
- Nand Lal Chaudhary, 84, Indian politician, MLA (1980–1990).
- Chamín Correa, 90, Mexican guitarist.
- Kazi Sekendar Ali Dalim, 75, Bangladeshi politician, MP (1996–2001).
- Guy Deplus, 95, French clarinetist.
- Bernard Diederich, 93, New Zealand-born Haitian journalist, author and historian.
- Jan-Olof Ekholm, 88, Swedish crime writer.
- Giovanni Gazzinelli, 92, Brazilian physician and scientist.
- Eville Gorham, 94, Canadian-American scientist.
- Heshimu Jaramogi, 67, American journalist, cancer.
- Jack Kehoe, 85, American actor (Serpico, The Sting, The Untouchables), complications from a stroke.
- Naděžda Kniplová, 87, Czech operatic soprano.
- Liang Jun, 90, Chinese tractor driver and national hero, depicted on the one yuan banknote.
- Gudrun Lund, 89, Danish composer.
- Carl McNulty, 89, American basketball player (Milwaukee Hawks).
- Jerry Norton, 88, American football player (Philadelphia Eagles, Green Bay Packers).
- Saidi Shariff, 79, Singaporean politician, MP (1980–1984).

=== 15 ===
- Buddy Allen, 82, American football player (Denver Broncos).
- Bobby Brown, 96, Scottish Hall of Fame football player (Rangers, Queen's Park) and manager (national team).
- Chris Darrow, 75, American musician (Kaleidoscope, Nitty Gritty Dirt Band), stroke.
- Frederick Darwent, 92, English bishop.
- Mark Harris, 72, Australian rugby league player (Eastern Suburbs, North Sydney Bears, national team), throat cancer.
- Rocky Johnson, 75, Canadian Hall of Fame professional wrestler (WWF, Big Time Wrestling, CWF) and trainer, pulmonary embolism.
- Julie Malenfant, 46, Canadian athlete.
- Bruno Nettl, 89, Czech-born American ethnomusicologist and musicologist.
- Abe Piasek, 91, American public speaker.
- Katherine W. Phillips, 47, American social scientist and academic, cancer.
- Rocky Rosema, 73, American football player (St. Louis Cardinals), dementia.
- Victor Salvemini, 73, Australian Paralympic athlete (1972, 1976).
- David Smeeton, 83, English journalist, cancer.
- Milovan Stepandić, 65, Serbian basketball coach (Šabac, Metalac, OKK Beograd).
- Kotaro Suzumura, 76, Japanese economist, pancreatic cancer.
- Ben Swane, 92, Australian nurseryman.
- Saša Tešić, 50, Serbian footballer (FK Priština, FK Milicionar).
- Nikolai Tsymbal, 94, Russian military officer.
- Ivan Ustinov, 100, Russian intelligence officer (NKVD, SMERSH, KGB).
- Michael Wheeler, 84, British sprinter, Olympic bronze medalist (1956).
- David Wildt, 69, American wildlife biologist.

=== 16 ===
- Bernard Grosfilley, 70, French alpine skier.
- Maik Hamburger, 88, German writer and dramaturge.
- Peter Hammersley, 91, British rear admiral.
- Hal Haskell, 98, American politician, member of the U.S. House of Representatives (1957–1959), mayor of Wilmington, Delaware (1969–1973).
- László Iván, 86, Hungarian psychiatrist and politician, MP (2006–2014).
- John Klyberg, 88, British priest, Bishop of Fulham (1985–1996).
- Naka Laxmaya, 69, Indian politician, MLA (1980–1985).
- Ian Mathers, 89, Australian footballer (Hawthorn).
- Alan Pattillo, 90, British television director (Supercar, Thunderbirds), writer and editor (All Quiet on the Western Front), complications from Parkinson's disease.
- Jibon Rahman, 56, Bangladeshi film director.
- Magda al-Sabahi, 88, Egyptian actress (Jamila, the Algerian).
- William J. Samarin, 93, American linguist and translator.
- Efraín Sánchez, 93, Colombian football player (San Lorenzo, Independiente Medellín, national team) and manager.
- R. Sathyanarayana, 93, Indian musicologist.
- Gene Schwinger, 87, American basketball player.
- Hiroshi Suzuki, 86, Japanese-American jazz trombonist.
- Christopher Tolkien, 95, British academic and editor (The Silmarillion, The History of Middle-earth).
- Barry Tuckwell, 88, Australian horn player and conductor, heart disease.
- Zhao Zhongxiang, 78, Chinese TV presenter (CCTV New Year's Gala).

=== 17 ===
- Pietro Anastasi, 71, Italian footballer (Juventus, Inter, national team), amyotrophic lateral sclerosis.
- Charles Carrère, 91, Senegalese poet.
- Peter Clarricoats, 87, British engineer.
- Jacques Desallangre, 84, French politician, Deputy (1997–2012).
- Thérèse Dion, 92, Canadian TV cooking show host.
- Rahşan Ecevit, 97, Turkish politician, co-founder of the Democratic Left Party.
- Derek Fowlds, 82, British actor (Yes Minister, Heartbeat, East of Sudan), heart failure from sepsis.
- Fernando Miguel Gil Eisner, 66, Uruguayan Roman Catholic prelate, Bishop of Salto (since 2018).
- Grant Goldman, 69, Australian radio announcer (2GB), cancer.
- Terence Hallinan, 83, American defense lawyer and prosecutor, District Attorney of San Francisco (1996–2004).
- Ralph P. Hoagland III, 86, American businessman, posterior cortical atrophy.
- Hwang Sun-hui, 100, North Korean politician, director of the Korean Revolution Museum (since 1990), pneumonia.
- Bobby Kay, 70, Canadian professional wrestler (Cormier wrestling family) and promoter (Eastern Sports Association).
- Georgi Kutoyan, 38, Armenian lawyer, director of the National Security Service (2016–2018), shot.
- Khagendra Thapa Magar, 27, Nepali record holder, world's shortest man (2010–2011), pneumonia.
- Bapu Nadkarni, 86, Indian cricketer (national team).
- Oswald Oberhuber, 88, Austrian sculptor and painter.
- Walter E. Powell, 88, American politician, Ohio state senator (1967–1971), member of the U.S. House of Representatives (1971–1975).
- Lech Raczak, 73, Polish theatre director, heart attack.
- Steve Rayner, 66, British social scientist, cancer.
- Claudio Roditi, 73, Brazilian-born American trumpeter, prostate cancer.
- Roger Schneider, 36, Swiss speed skater.
- Emanuele Severino, 90, Italian philosopher.
- Stanisław Stefanek, 83, Polish Roman Catholic prelate, Bishop of Łomża (1996–2011).
- Kaj Sylvan, 96, Danish sprint canoeist.
- Morimichi Takagi, 78, Japanese Hall of Fame baseball player (Chunichi Dragons), heart failure.
- Rhona Wurtele, 97, Canadian Olympic skier (1948).

=== 18 ===
- Dan Andrei Aldea, 69, Romanian rock musician (Sfinx), heart attack.
- Fernando Báez Sosa, 18, Argentine law student, murdered.
- V. Balram, 72, Indian politician, MLA (1996–2004).
- Mario Bergamaschi, 91, Italian footballer (Milan, Sampdoria, national team).
- Peter Beyerhaus, 90, German Protestant theologian.
- Bollin Eric, 21, British racehorse, St Leger winner (2002).
- John Burke, 68, Canadian composer and music educator, recipient of the Jules Léger Prize for New Chamber Music (1995).
- Cajun Beat, 20, American Thoroughbred racehorse, Breeders' Cup Sprint winner (2003).
- Isabel Cabanillas, 26, Mexican artist and activist, shot.
- Frieda Rapoport Caplan, 96, American businesswoman.
- Ashwini Kumar Chopra, 63, Indian journalist, cricketer and politician, MP (2014–2019), cancer.
- Allison Copening, 55, American politician, member of the Nevada Senate (2009–2013).
- Tom Crow, 88, Australian cricketer and golfer.
- William C. Davis, 81, American football player (Mount Union Purple Raiders), coach (Adrian Bulldogs) and executive (Philadelphia Eagles), complications from Alzheimer's disease.
- Stanley Dudrick, 84, American surgeon.
- André Dulait, 82, French politician, Senator (1995–2014), mayor of Ménigoute (2001–2008).
- Urs Egger, 66, Swiss film director (Children of the Open Road, Opernball).
- Empire Maker, 19, American racehorse, Belmont Stakes winner (2003).
- Mohamed Gouider, 79, Tunisian Olympic runner.
- Antonia Gransden, 91, English historian and medievalist.
- Dr. Hannibal, 56, Canadian professional wrestler (Stampede Wrestling, FMW), heart attack.
- Norm Hill, 91, Canadian football player (Calgary Stampeders, Winnipeg Blue Bombers).
- Peter Hobday, 82, British news presenter (Today, Newsnight, World at One).
- Bubby Jones, 78, American Hall of Fame racing driver.
- Egil Krogh, 80, American lawyer, U.S. Under Secretary of Transportation (1973), heart failure.
- Robert Maclennan, Baron Maclennan of Rogart, 83, British politician, MP (1966–2001), Leader of the SDP (1987–1988) and President of the Liberal Democrats (1995–1998).
- Abdul Mannan, 66, Bangladeshi politician, MP (since 2008), cardiac arrest.
- Peter Mathebula, 67, South African WBA flyweight champion boxer (1980–1981).
- Roger Nicolet, 88, Belgian-born Canadian engineer (CN Tower, Louvre Pyramid).
- David Olney, 71, American singer-songwriter, heart attack.
- Petr Pokorný, 86, Czech Protestant theologian.
- Robert Sampson, 86, American actor (Bridget Loves Bernie, Re-Animator, Falcon Crest).
- Piri Sciascia, 73, New Zealand Māori leader, kapa haka exponent and university administrator.
- Abbas Ullah Shikder, 65, Bangladeshi film producer (Beder Meye Josna, Moner Majhe Tumi, Ji Hujur).
- Gordon A. Smith, 100, Canadian artist.
- Jim Smith, 84, Canadian politician.
- Jack Van Impe, 88, American televangelist.
- George Herbert Walker III, 88, American businessman, diplomat and philanthropist, Ambassador to Hungary (2003–2006).

=== 19 ===
- Charles Alverson, 84, American screenwriter (Jabberwocky).
- Kazım Ayvaz, 81, Turkish Greco-Roman wrestler, Olympic champion (1964).
- David Chadwick, 93, American clinical and research pediatrician and author.
- Herbert W. Chilstrom, 88, American Lutheran bishop.
- David Climer, 66, American sports columnist (The Tennessean), cancer.
- Manfred Clynes, 94, Austrian-born Australian-American scientist, inventor and musician.
- Richard M. Dudley, 81, American mathematician.
- Pat Evans, 93–94, Welsh Olympic gymnast (1948).
- Fang Shouxian, 87, Chinese accelerator physicist, President of the Institute of High Energy Physics.
- Lee Gelber, 81, American urban historian and tour guide.
- John Gibson, 60, Canadian ice hockey player (Winnipeg Jets, Toronto Maple Leafs, Los Angeles Kings).
- Harold G. Glasgow, 90, American major general.
- Bill Greenwood, 77, American television reporter (ABC News).
- Chisako Hara, 84, Japanese actress.
- Jimmy Heath, 93, American jazz saxophonist (Heath Brothers).
- Marilyn Lanfear, 89, American sculptor and performance artist.
- David Leach, 91, Australian vice admiral, Chief of the Naval Staff (1982–1985).
- Gene London, 88, American children's television presenter (WCAU, WABD, NBC), cerebral hemorrhage from a fall.
- Dee Molenaar, 101, American mountaineer and writer.
- James Mollison, 88, Australian arts administrator, director of the National Gallery of Australia (1971–1989) and the National Gallery of Victoria (1989–1995).
- Nanjil Nalini, 76, Indian actress.
- Ikkō Narahara, 88, Japanese photographer.
- Joe Steve Ó Neachtain, 77, Irish writer and playwright.
- Robert Parker, 89, American R&B singer ("Barefootin'").
- Sunanda Patnaik, 85, Indian Gwalior gharana classical singer.
- Audrey Rennard, 87, British Olympic gymnast.
- Anne Wilson Schaef, 85, American clinical psychologist and author.
- Blagovest Sendov, 87, Bulgarian diplomat, mathematician and politician, Chairperson of the National Assembly (1995–1997) and ambassador to Japan (2004–2009).
- Ali Mardan Shah, 63, Pakistani politician, member of the Provincial Assembly of Sindh (2002–2018), cardiac arrest.
- Shin Kyuk-ho, 98, South Korean businessman, founder of Lotte Corporation.
- Sher Bahadur Singh, 87, Indian politician.
- Man Sood, 80, Indian cricketer (national team).
- Danny Talbott, 75, American football player (Washington Redskins), cancer.
- Allah Thérèse, Ivorian traditional musician.
- Guy Thomas, 85, Belgian-born French songwriter.
- Josie Urpani, 83, Maltese footballer (Valletta, national team) and manager (Valletta).
- Leonard Woodley, 92, British barrister.

=== 20 ===
- Steph Bowe, 25, Australian author and blogger, T-lymphoblastic lymphoma.
- Nedda Casei, 87, American operatic mezzo-soprano.
- Franck Delhem, 83, Belgian Olympic fencer (1960).
- Gilles Delouche, 71, French literary scholar.
- Pesach Eliyahu Falk, 77, British rabbi, heart attack
- Raymond D. Fogelson, 86, American anthropologist.
- Wolfgang J. Fuchs, 74, German author, historian and comic book translator.
- Jay Hankins, 84, American baseball player (Kansas City Athletics).
- Wendy Havran, 64, American immunologist, complications from a heart attack.
- Kit Hood, 76, British-born Canadian television producer (Degrassi), brain aneurysm.
- Bill Kaiserman, 77, American fashion designer, complications from a stroke and pneumonia.
- Emory Kemp, 88, American civil engineer and industrial archaeologist.
- Jaroslav Kubera, 72, Czech politician, President of the Senate (since 2018) and mayor of Teplice (1994–2018).
- Reijo Kuistila, 88, Finnish Olympic equestrian.
- Richard L. Lawson, 90, American Air Force general.
- Bicks Ndoni, 61, South African politician, chief whip of Nelson Mandela Bay Metropolitan Municipality (since 2018), heart attack.
- Ulf Norrman, 84, Swedish Olympic sailor (1968).
- Gyanendra Nath Pande, Indian engineer.
- Roy Piovesana, 77, Canadian historian, heart attack.
- Tom Railsback, 87, American politician, member of the Illinois (1962–1966) and U.S. House of Representatives (1967–1983).
- Joe Shishido, 86, Japanese actor (Youth of the Beast, Branded to Kill, A Tale of Sorrow and Sadness).
- Michael I. Sovern, 88, American legal scholar and academic administrator, President of Columbia University (1980–1993), amyloid cardiomyopathy.
- Shamsher Singh Surjewala, 87, Indian politician, MLA (1967–1972, 1977–1987, 1991–1992, 2005–2009), MP (1992–1998).
- Mick Vinter, 65, English footballer (Notts County, Wrexham, Oxford United).
- Henry C. Wente, 83, American mathematician, complications from pneumonia.

=== 21 ===
- Paul Addison, 76, British author and historian.
- Norman Amadio, 91, Canadian jazz pianist and bandleader.
- Larry Amar, 47, American Olympic field hockey player (1996) and manager.
- Katerina Anghelaki-Rooke, 80, Greek poet and academic.
- Hédi Baccouche, 90, Tunisian politician, Prime Minister (1987–1989).
- Herbert Baumann, 94, German composer.
- Eugène Berger, 59, Luxembourgish politician, MP (1994–2004, since 2007).
- Bandar bin Muhammad Al Saud, 95, Saudi prince.
- John R. Buckley, 88, American politician, Massachusetts state representative (1965–1975), Massachusetts Secretary of Administration and Finance (1975–1979).
- Hank Burnine, 87, American football player (Philadelphia Eagles).
- James Chesebro, 75, American communication theorist.
- Sébastien Demorand, 50, French journalist, cancer.
- Terry Jones, 77, Welsh comic actor, screenwriter and film director (Monty Python), frontotemporal dementia.
- Patrick Kennedy, 78, Irish politician, Senator (1981–1982, 1983–1993).
- Hermann Korte, 71, German academic.
- Shuchi Kubouchi, 99, Japanese Go player.
- Warren Meck, 63, American psychologist.
- Zlatko Mesić, 73, Croatian footballer (Dinamo Zagreb).
- Vladimir Muravyov, 81, Russian military officer, Strategic Missile Forces.
- Meritxell Negre, 48, Spanish singer (Peaches & Herb), cancer.
- Gerry Priestley, 88, English footballer (Grimsby Town, Crystal Palace, Halifax Town).
- Ismat Ara Sadique, 77, Bangladeshi politician, Minister of Primary and Mass Education (2014) and Public Administration (2014–2018), MP (since 2014).
- Ronald Senungetuk, 87, American Iñupiat artist.
- Tengiz Sigua, 85, Georgian politician, Prime Minister (1992–1993).
- Boris Tsirelson, 69, Russian-Israeli mathematician.
- Ian Tuxworth, 77, Australian politician, Chief Minister of the Northern Territory (1984–1986).
- Theodor Wagner, 92, Austrian football player (Wacker Wien, national team) and manager (Wacker Innsbruck).
- Gloria Weber, 86, American politician, Missouri state representative (1993–1995).
- De'Runnya Wilson, 25, American football player (Mississippi State Bulldogs), shot.
- Morgan Wootten, 88, American Hall of Fame high school basketball coach (DeMatha Catholic High School).
- Fa-Yueh Wu, 88, Chinese mathematician and physicist, emeritus professor at Northeastern University.

=== 22 ===
- Hercules Ayala, 69, Puerto Rican professional wrestler (Stampede Wrestling, NJPW, WWC).
- Tom Calvin, 93, American football player (Pittsburgh Steelers).
- Roser Rahola d'Espona, 105, Spanish editor and baroness.
- Sonny Grosso, 89, German-born American police detective, actor and television producer (The French Connection, Night Heat).
- John Karlen, 86, American actor (Daughters of Darkness, Dark Shadows, Cagney & Lacey), heart failure.
- John Kasper, 73, New Zealand cricketer (Auckland, Natal).
- Gerda Kieninger, 68, German politician, member of the Landtag of North Rhine-Westphalia (1995–2017).
- Salvatore Laudani, 72, Italian Olympic weightlifter.
- Oskar Leupi, 87, Swiss Olympic runner.
- George F. MacDonald, 81, Canadian anthropologist, director of Canadian Museum of Civilization (1983–1998).
- Julius Montgomery, 90, American aerospace engineer and politician.
- John Douglas Morrison, 85, Australian police officer.
- Paul Murphy, 87, American politician and judge, Massachusetts state representative (1961–1974).
- John S. Pobee, 82, Ghanaian theologian.
- Sandor Rivnyak, 82, American Olympic handball player.
- Opas Ruengpanyawut, 64, Thai Olympic sport shooter.
- Bertrand Teyou, 50, Cameroonian author.
- Addy Valero, 50, Venezuelan politician, National Assembly Deputy (since 2016), uterine cancer.
- Ralph Weymouth, 102, American Vice Admiral and anti-nuclear activist.
- M. Crawford Young, 88, American political scientist, complications from heart failure.

=== 23 ===
- Robert Archibald, 39, Scottish basketball player (Memphis Grizzlies, Toronto Raptors, Club Joventut Badalona).
- Sir Frederick Ballantyne, 83, Vincentian cardiologist, Governor-General (2002–2019).
- Clayton Christensen, 67, American business theorist, cancer.
- Hester Diamond, 91, American art collector, breast cancer.
- Tom Daley, 86, English footballer (Grimsby Town).
- Fernand Daoust, 93, Canadian trade unionist, President of the Fédération des travailleurs et travailleuses du Québec (1991–1993).
- Frank Froehling, 77, American tennis player, lymphocytic leukemia.
- Jake Godbold, 86, American politician, mayor of Jacksonville, Florida (1978–1987).
- Robert Harper, 68, American actor (Frank's Place, Once Upon a Time in America, Twins), cancer.
- Adolf Holl, 89, Austrian theologian.
- Ricarda Jacobi, 96, German painter.
- Stephen James Joyce, 87, Irish literary executor of James Joyce.
- Alfred Körner, 93, Austrian football player (Rapid Wien, national team) and manager (First Vienna).
- Marsha Kramer, 74, American actress (Modern Family).
- Jim Lehrer, 85, American journalist (PBS NewsHour).
- Thaddeus F. Malanowski, 97, American priest, Deputy Chief of Chaplains of the United States Army.
- Franz Mazura, 95, Austrian operatic bass-baritone, Grammy winner (1981, 1986).
- Michele McDonald, 67, American model and beauty pageant contestant, Miss USA 1971.
- Patrick Mitchell, 89, British Anglican priest, Dean of Wells (1973–1989) and Windsor (1989–1997).
- Gourahari Naik, 60, Indian politician, MLA (2000–2009).
- Adolfo Natalini, 78, Italian architect (Superstudio).
- Ashish Parmar, 40, Indian photographer, complications from a heart attack.
- Gudrun Pausewang, 91, German author (The Last Children of Schewenborn, Die Wolke).
- Barbara Remington, 90, American artist and illustrator.
- Peter Salama, 51, Australian epidemiologist and WHO official, heart attack.
- Jean-Noël Tremblay, 93, Canadian politician.
- Kalevi Tuominen, 92, Finnish Hall of Fame basketball player (Tampereen Pyrintö), coach (national team) and executive.
- Armando Uribe, 86, Chilean writer and diplomat, Ambassador to China (1971–1973) and winner of the National Prize for Literature (2004).
- Herbert Voelcker, 90, American Olympic sports shooter (1956).

=== 24 ===
- David Adam, 83, British priest and author.
- Nusrat Badr, Indian lyricist ("Dola Re Dola").
- Duje Bonačić, 90, Croatian rower, Olympic champion (1952).
- Georges Castera, 83, Haitian poet and writer.
- José Luis Castro Medellín, 81, Mexican Roman Catholic prelate, Bishop of Tacámbaro (2002–2014).
- Chai Chidchob, 92, Thai politician, President of the National Assembly (2008–2011).
- Fernando Cordero Rusque, 80, Chilean military officer and politician, General Director of Carabineros (1995–1997) and Senator (1998–2006).
- Gene Corrigan, 91, American Hall of Fame lacrosse player, coach (Washington and Lee Generals, Virginia Cavaliers) and college athletics administrator (Notre Dame Fighting Irish).
- Sheldon Drobny, 74, American accountant and founder of the Air America radio network.
- Robert Erwin, 85, American jurist, Justice of the Alaska Supreme Court (1970–1977), complications from heart failure.
- Abderraouf El-Fassy, 86, Moroccan Olympic fencer.
- John Fry, 90, American journalist, heart attack.
- Aenne Goldschmidt, 99, Swiss expressionist dancer and choreographer.
- Herman Goldstein, 88, American criminologist.
- Carl Holm, 92, Danish footballer.
- Kennedy Isles, 28, Saint Kitts and Nevis footballer, shot.
- Leila Janah, 37, American entrepreneur, founder of Samasource, epithelioid sarcoma.
- Vic Kristopaitis, 84, American football player (BC Lions, Toronto Argonauts).
- Yuri Viktorovich Kuznetsov, 73, Russian military officer, Hero of the Soviet Union.
- Li Fanghua, 88, Chinese physicist, member of the Chinese Academy of Sciences.
- Margo Lion, 75, American theatre producer (Hairspray), brain aneurysm.
- Seamus Mallon, 83, Northern Irish Gaelic footballer (Middletown) and politician, Senator (1982) and Deputy First Minister (1998–2001).
- Horst Meyer, 77, German rower, Olympic gold medalist (1968).
- Justice Pain, 41, American professional wrestler (CZW), suicide by jumping.
- Ibsen Pinheiro, 84, Brazilian prosecutor and politician, President of the Chamber of Deputies (1991–1993) and Deputy (1983–1994, 2003–2011), cardiac arrest.
- Juan José Pizzuti, 92, Argentine football player (Banfield, Racing Club, national team) and manager.
- Sean Reinert, 48, American drummer (Cynic, Death, Æon Spoke).
- Rob Rensenbrink, 72, Dutch footballer (DWS, Anderlecht, national team), progressive spinal muscular atrophy.
- Zsolt Richly, 78, Hungarian animator.
- Giovanny Romero Infante, 31, Peruvian journalist and LGBTQ activist.
- Jagannath Rout, 77, Indian politician, MLA (1980–1990, 1995–1999), cardiac arrest.
- Millard Seldin, 93, American businessman.
- Vinay Kumar Sinha, 74, Indian film producer (Chor Police, Andaz Apna Apna, Naseeb).
- Pete Stark, 88, American politician and attorney, member of the U.S. House of Representatives (1973–2013).
- Edwin Straver, 48, Dutch rally motorcyclist, injuries sustained in race crash.
- Mülhüpra Vero, 86, Indian politician, MP (since 1989).
- Wes Wilson, 82, American psychedelic poster artist (Jefferson Airplane, Grateful Dead, Bill Graham), cancer.
- Forrest L. Wood, 87, American entrepreneur, founder of Ranger Boats.

=== 25 ===
- Antonia Apodaca, 96, American musician and songwriter.
- Vasily Bakalov, 90, Russian military engineer and designer (9M113 Konkurs, 2K22 Tunguska, Drozd).
- Sir Michael Cummins, 80, British parliamentary official, Serjeant at Arms of the House of Commons (2000–2005).
- Siegfried Enns, 95, Canadian politician.
- Meredith Etherington-Smith, 73, British fashion journalist, heart attack.
- Lorenzo Ghiglieri, 88, American sculptor.
- Golok Chandra Goswami, 96, Indian academic and linguist.
- Nina Griscom, 65, American model, television host and columnist, amyotrophic lateral sclerosis.
- Ip Ching, 83, Chinese martial artist.
- Anne Kulle, 76, Swedish actress.
- Liang Wudong, 60, Chinese physician, COVID-19.
- Otakar Mareček, 76, Czech rower, Olympic bronze medalist (1972).
- Bob Markell, 95, American television producer (The Defenders, N.Y.P.D.) and art director (12 Angry Men).
- Shirley Murray, 88, New Zealand hymn writer.
- Tor Obrestad, 81, Norwegian author.
- Narciso Parigi, 92, Italian singer and actor.
- Todd Portune, 61, American politician, Hamilton County Commissioner (2001–2019), spinal cancer.
- Stephen R. Reed, 70, American politician, member of the Pennsylvania House of Representatives (1975–1980) and mayor of Harrisburg (1982–2010).
- Denis Rivière, 75, French painter.
- Holger Romander, 98, Swedish civil servant, National Police Commissioner (1978–1987).
- Dame Alison Roxburgh, 85, New Zealand women's rights advocate and community leader.
- Carleton H. Sheets, 80, American real estate investor and author.
- Jordan Sinnott, 25, English footballer (Altrincham, FC Halifax Town), beaten.
- Hartmut Steinecke, 79, German literary critic.
- Thuy Thanh Truong, 34, Vietnamese entrepreneur, cancer.
- Monique van Vooren, 92, Belgian-born American actress (Tarzan and the She-Devil, Happy Anniversary, Fearless Frank) and dancer, cancer.
- Ben Hur Villanueva, 81, Filipino artist.
- Clifford Wiens, 93, Canadian architect.
- Garbis Zakaryan, 90, Turkish boxer.

=== 26 ===
- Jos Bernard, 95, Luxembourgish Olympic gymnast (1948).
- Maharaj Kishan Bhan, 72, Indian virologist and paediatrician, cancer.
- Vsevolod Chaplin, 51, Russian Orthodox clergyman, stroke.
- Alfredo Da Silva, 84, Bolivian-American artist, traffic collision.
- Maurice Sanford Fox, 95, American geneticist and molecular biologist.
- Lucy Jarvis, 102, American television producer (Family Reunion).
- Nathaniel R. Jones, 93, American attorney and jurist, Judge of the U.S. Court of Appeals for the Sixth Circuit (1979–2002).
- Gloria Lubkin, 86, American science journalist and editor.
- Gordon McLauchlan, 89, New Zealand author, social historian, and television and radio presenter.
- Terje Meyer, 77, Norwegian industrial designer.
- Michou, 88, French cabaret artist.
- Hubert Mingarelli, 64, French writer, cancer.
- Santu Mofokeng, 64, South African photographer, progressive supranuclear palsy.
- Louis Nirenberg, 94, Canadian-American mathematician, co-developer of Gagliardo–Nirenberg interpolation inequality, Abel Prize winner (2015).
- Bob Shane, 85, American singer and guitarist (The Kingston Trio), complications from pneumonia.
- Wang Xianliang, 62, Chinese politician, COVID-19.
- Robert Weilbacher, 73, Micronesian politician, Governor of Kosrae (2007–2011).
- Notable Americans killed in the Calabasas helicopter crash:
  - John Altobelli, 56, baseball coach (Orange Coast College).
  - Gianna Bryant, 13, student-athlete
  - Kobe Bryant, 41, basketball player (Los Angeles Lakers), Olympic champion (2008, 2012) and Oscar winner (2018).

=== 27 ===
- Sharif al Mujahid, 93, Pakistani professor.
- Frank Anderson, 77, American intelligence officer and spymaster.
- Xana Antunes, 55, British-American business journalist, pancreatic cancer.
- Ramón Avilés, 68, Puerto Rican baseball player (Boston Red Sox, Philadelphia Phillies).
- Lina Ben Mhenni, 36, Tunisian political activist and blogger, kidney disease.
- Haakon Bjørklid, 94, Norwegian artist.
- Allen Brown, 76, American football player (Green Bay Packers).
- Jack Burns, 86, American comedian, actor (The Andy Griffith Show) and screenwriter (The Muppet Show), respiratory failure.
- Rathin Datta, 88, Indian physician.
- Bernard de Give, 106, Belgian Trappist monk.
- Derek Edwards, 77, British rugby league player (Castleford, national team).
- Flamarion, 68, Brazilian football player and trainer.
- Edvardas Gudavičius, 90, Lithuanian historian.
- James Houra, 67, Ivorian painter.
- Rolf Jobst, 68, German Olympic rower.
- Émile Jung, 78, French chef (Au Crocodile).
- Eva Marks, 87, Austrian-born Australian Holocaust survivor.
- Lovemore Matombo, 75, Zimbabwean trade unionist, president of ZCTU (2002–2008).
- Norbert Moutier, 78, French film director (Dinosaur from the Deep).
- Reed Mullin, 53, American rock drummer (Corrosion of Conformity, Teenage Time Killers).
- Alberto Naranjo, 78, Venezuelan musician.
- Gennaro Olivieri, 77, Italian football player (SPAL, Perugia) and manager (Reggina).
- Jason Polan, 37, American artist and illustrator, cancer.
- Johnny Ray, 82, American NASCAR driver.
- K. Amarnath Shetty, 80, Indian politician, MLA (1983–1998).
- Harold Edward Taylor, 81, American politician.
- Nelly Wicky, 96, Swiss politician, member of the National Council (1971–1975).
- Michael W. Wright, 81, American CFL player (Winnipeg Blue Bombers) and business executive, CEO of SuperValu, managing director of Wells Fargo, pneumonia.
- Yang Xiaobo, 57, Chinese engineer, politician and business executive, mayor of Huangshi (2009–2014), COVID-19.
- Mohammad Zuhdi Nashashibi, 95, Palestinian politician, Finance Minister of the Palestinian National Authority (1994–2002).

=== 28 ===
- Julia Breck, 78, British actress (Q...).
- Lowry Burgess, 79-80, American artist.
- Chris Doleman, 58, American Hall of Fame football player (Minnesota Vikings, Atlanta Falcons, San Francisco 49ers), glioblastoma.
- Marj Dusay, 83, American actress (Guiding Light, The Facts of Life, MacArthur).
- Frank Edwards, 69, American politician, mayor of Springfield, Illinois (2010–2011), plane crash.
- Narciso Elvira, 52, Mexican baseball player (Milwaukee Brewers), shot.
- Paul Farnes, 101, British Royal Air Force flying ace (The Few).
- Harriet Frank Jr., 96, American screenwriter (Hud, Norma Rae, The Carey Treatment).
- Robert V. Gentry, 86, American Young Earth creationist and nuclear physicist.
- Abdul Ghafoor, 60, Indian politician, MLA (1995–2005, since 2010).
- Oscar N. Harris, 80, American politician, member of the North Carolina Senate (1998–2002), mayor of Dunn, North Carolina (1987–1995, 2003–2019).
- Harry Harrison, 89, American radio personality (WMCA, WABC, WCBS-FM).
- Don Hasenmayer, 92, American baseball player (Philadelphia Phillies).
- Hergo, 68, French photographer.
- Sándor Kaló, 75, Hungarian Olympic handball player (1972) and coach.
- Naomi Karungi, 41, Ugandan military officer, helicopter crash.
- Théo Klein, 99, French lawyer (Conseil Représentatif des Institutions juives de France).
- Irwin Lewis, 80, Australian Indigenous artist.
- Jameela Malik, 74, Indian actress (Chottanikkara Amma, Sexilla Stundilla, Nadhiyai Thedi Vandha Kadal).
- Othmar Mága, 90, German conductor.
- John Mitchell, 82, American baseball player (Birmingham Black Barons, Detroit Stars).
- Léon Mokuna, 91, Congolese football player (Sporting, Gent) and manager (national team).
- Mohammad Munaf, 84, Pakistani cricketer (national team).
- Nicholas Parsons, 96, British actor (Four Feather Falls), radio and television presenter (Just a Minute, Sale of the Century), Rector of the University of St Andrews (1988–1991).
- Carlos Rocha, 93, Portuguese-born Canadian professional wrestler (WWWF).
- Peter Rogers, 72, British businessman (Babcock International).
- Jasper Sanfilippo, 88, American businessman.
- Dyanne Thorne, 83, American actress (Ilsa, She Wolf of the SS, Chesty Anderson, USN, Hellhole), pancreatic cancer.

=== 29 ===
- Sheikha Ahmed al-Mahmoud, Qatari politician.
- Qasim al-Raymi, 41, Yemeni Islamic militant, emir of Al-Qaeda in the Arabian Peninsula (since 2015), drone airstrike.
- Michiyo Azusa, 76, Japanese singer and actress, heart attack.
- Vidmantas Bartulis, 65, Lithuanian composer.
- Ruth Butterworth, 85, British-born New Zealand political scientist.
- Mike Dancis, 80, Latvian-born Australian Olympic basketball player (1964).
- Georges-Hilaire Dupont, 100, French Roman Catholic prelate, Bishop of Pala (1964–1975).
- Kim Eastland, 67, American game designer.
- Larry Eisenhauer, 79, American football player (Boston Patriots).
- Alfred John Ellis, 104, Canadian banker.
- Robert Enstad, 81, American journalist (Chicago Seven).
- Tofig Gasimov, 81, Azerbaijani politician and diplomat, Minister of Foreign Affairs (1992–1993).
- Blagoja Georgievski, 69, Macedonian basketball player (Rabotnički) and coach, Olympic silver medallist (1976).
- Homero Gómez González, 50, Mexican anti-logging activist, head trauma. (body discovered on this date)
- Tushar Kanjilal, 84, Indian social worker.
- Donnie Cleveland Lance, 66, American convicted murderer, execution by lethal injection.
- Irina Laricheva, 55, Russian Olympic trap shooter (2004, 2008).
- Eddie Legard, 84, English cricketer (Warwickshire).
- Antonino Riccardo Luciani, 88, Italian classical composer and conductor.
- Félix Marcilhac, 78, French art historian and collector.
- Christoph Meckel, 84, German author and graphic designer.
- Dale L. Mortensen, 53, American politician, member of the Montana House of Representatives (since 2014).
- Keith Nelson, 77, Scottish-born New Zealand footballer (national team).
- Frank Press, 95, American geophysicist, President of the National Academy of Sciences (1981–1993).
- Sigurbergur Sigsteinsson, 71, Icelandic Olympic handball player.
- Ajmal Sultanpuri, 95, Indian Urdu poet.
- Matty Todd, 95, British submariner.
- Yannis Tseklenis, 82, Greek fashion designer.
- Bruce Wannell, 66, English translator and linguist.

=== 30 ===
- Muhammad Abu Khubza, 87, Moroccan theologian and linguist.
- John Andretti, 56, American racing driver (NASCAR Cup Series, CART), colon cancer.
- Miguel Arroyo, 53, Mexican road racing cyclist, National champion (2000), complications during surgery.
- Vidya Bal, 84, Indian feminist writer.
- Lucien Barbarin, 63, American jazz trombonist (Preservation Hall Jazz Band), cancer.
- Vitaliy Boiko, 82, Ukrainian lawyer and diplomat, Minister of Justice (1990–1992), Ambassador to Moldova (1993–1994) and Chairman of the Supreme Court (1994–2002).
- Larbi Chebbak, 73, Moroccan footballer (Union Sidi Kacem, national team).
- Luboš Dobrovský, 87, Czech journalist, politician and dissident, Minister of Defence (1990–1992) and Ambassador to Russia (1996–2000).
- Jörn Donner, 86, Finnish writer, film director (Fanny and Alexander, Men Can't Be Raped, Anna) and politician, MP (1987–1995, 2007, 2013–2015), MEP (1996–1999), lung disease.
- Gisela Eckhardt, 93, German physicist, co-developer of the Raman laser.
- Nello Fabbri, 85, Italian racing cyclist.
- Terry Fair, 59, American basketball player (Georgia Bulldogs, Hapoel Tel Aviv, Maccabi Tel Aviv).
- Yoshinaga Fujita, 69, Japanese novelist and screenwriter (Adrift in Tokyo), lung cancer.
- Ge Hongsheng, 88, Chinese politician, Governor of Zhejiang (1990–1993).
- Johannes Geiss, 93, German astrophysicist.
- Barrie Gilbert, 82, English-American inventor.
- Chanin Hale, 91, American actress (The Red Skelton Show).
- Roger Holeindre, 90, French military officer and politician, MP (1986–1988).
- Richard Hunstead, 76, Australian astronomer.
- Dale Jasper, 56, English footballer (Chelsea, Brighton, Crewe Alexandra).
- Ann J. Johanson, 85, American pediatric endocrinologist.
- M. Kamalam, 93, Indian politician, MLA (1980–1987).
- Pierre-Étienne Laporte, 85, Canadian politician.
- Jake MacDonald, 70, Canadian author, fall.
- Joe Millea, 78, Irish hurler.
- William Mitchell, 94, English sculptor.
- Soroku Murata, 92, Japanese violinmaker, cancer.
- Z. Obed, 88, Indian politician, MLA (1993–1998, 2003–2008).
- Erneido Oliva, 87, Cuban-American military officer (Brigade 2506).
- T. S. Raghavendra, 75, Indian actor (Vaidehi Kathirunthal, Chinna Thambi Periya Thambi, Vaazhga Jananayagam), playback singer and music director.
- Raymond Reierson, 100, Canadian politician.
- Fred Silverman, 82, American Hall of Fame television programmer (CBS, ABC, NBC) and producer, cancer.
- Tian Chengren, 93, Chinese actor (Warm Spring), winner of the 1984 Flying Apsaras Award for Outstanding Actor.
- Manohar Untwal, 53, Indian politician, MLA (1988–2003, 2008–2014, since 2018) and MP (2014–2018), brain hemorrhage.
- Mauro Varela, 78, Spanish banker, lawyer and politician, Deputy (1989–2000) and member of the Parliament of Galicia (1997–2001).
- Roland Wlodyka, 81, American racing driver.
- Zhang Changshou, 90, Chinese archaeologist, Vice Director of the Institute of Archaeology, Chinese Academy of Social Sciences (1985–1988).

=== 31 ===
- Khaled Bichara, 48, Egyptian business executive, CEO of Orascom Telecom Holding (since 2009), traffic collision.
- Michel Billière, 76, French rugby union player (Stade Toulousain).
- Buck Bounds, 90, American politician.
- Alexander Joseph Brunett, 86, American Roman Catholic prelate, Archbishop of Seattle (1997–2010).
- Johnny Bumphus, 59, American boxer, WBA junior welterweight champion (1984), cardiac arrest.
- Anne Cox Chambers, 100, American media proprietor (Cox Enterprises) and diplomat, Ambassador to Belgium (1977–1981).
- Chen Fushou, 88, Indonesian-born Chinese badminton player and coach, Uber Cup winner (1984, 1986).
- Louise D. Clement-Hoff, 93, American artist.
- Guy Delcourt, 72, French politician, MP (2012–2017) and mayor of Lens (1998–2013).
- James Dunn, 92, Australian diplomat.
- Mark Dziersk, 60, American industrial designer.
- Thomas Fay, 79, American politician and jurist, Rhode Island state representative (1969–1978), Chief Justice of the Rhode Island Supreme Court (1986–1993).
- Tony Ford, 77–78, New Zealand lawyer and jurist, Chief Justice of the Kingdom of Tonga (2006–2010).
- Delphine Forest, 53, French actress, cancer.
- Mary Higgins Clark, 92, American author (A Stranger Is Watching, A Cry in the Night, Remember Me).
- Wazi Uddin Khan, 83, Bangladeshi politician, MP (1986–1988, 1996–2001).
- Wen Zengxian, 68, Chinese politician, Deputy director-general of the Civil Affairs Department of Hubei Province (1997–2010), COVID-19.
- Mirza Khazar, 72, Azerbaijani author and political analyst.
- Ram Lakhan Mahato, 74, Indian politician, MLA (1995–2000, 2005–2010), heart attack.
- Andrée Melly, 87, English actress (The Brides of Dracula).
- Bob Monahan, 91, American ice hockey player (Michigan Tech Huskies).
- Miloslav Penner, 47, Czech footballer (SK Dynamo České Budějovice, 1. FK Příbram, Fastav Zlín).
- Uma Sambanthan, 90, Malaysian political activist.
- Melvin Seeman, 101, American social psychologist.
- Janez Stanovnik, 97, Slovenian economist and politician, President (1988–1990).
- Gunnar Svensson, 64, Swedish ice hockey player (Björklöven) and coach (Djurgården, Troja/Ljungby), non-Hodgkin lymphoma.
- William Thomas, 92, British priest, Archdeacon of Northumberland (1982–1993).
- Dalip Kaur Tiwana, 84, Indian author, lung disease.
- Katsumasa Uchida, 75, Japanese actor.
- Donald J. West, 95, English psychiatrist and parapsychologist.
- Yang Xin, 79–80, Chinese art historian and curator, Vice Director of the Palace Museum (1987–2000).
- César Zabala, 58, Paraguayan footballer (Cerro Porteño, Talleres, national team), bladder cancer.
