= Sheikha Ahmed al-Mahmoud =

Qatari politician (died 2020)

Minister of Education
- In office May 2003 – 2009
- Monarch: Hamad bin Khalifa Al Thani
- Prime Minister: Abdullah bin Khalifa Al Thani; Hamad bin Jassim bin Jaber Al Thani
- Succeeded by: Saad bin Ibrahim Al-Mahmoud

Sheikha Ahmed al-Mahmoud (died 29 January 2020) was appointed the first woman member of the Qatari cabinet in 2003. She became the Minister of Education, a post she held till 2009. She died on 29 January 2020.

== Early life ==
Al-Mahmoud was the daughter of Ahmed bin Ali bin Mohammed Al Mahmoud. She held a Bachelor of Arts degree in Arabic literature.

== Career ==
Her career began in 1970 when she became a school teacher. Apart from teaching, Al-Mahmoud has served as a secondary school's principal, member of Committee for revising elementary education methods. In 1996, she became the first woman Deputy Assistant Minister of education in Qatar. She was also appointed an Under secretary in the Ministry of Culture, Cultivation and Education. She retained the post till May 2003, when the Emir of Qatar Sheikh Hamad bin Khalifa Al Thani made her the Minister of Education; the first Qatari women to hold a cabinet post and the second in Gulf region to do so.

Al-Mahmoud was made the Secretary General of Qatar's Supreme Education Council in May 2006. In 2009, Saad bin Ibrahim Al-Mahmoud succeeded her as the Minister of Education.

== Personal life ==
Al-Mahmoud had two daughters and two sons.
