= Frank Anderson (intelligence officer) =

American intelligence officer and spymaster

President of the Middle East Policy Council
- In office 2009–2012
- Preceded by: Chas W. Freeman Jr.

Personal details
- Born: February 1, 1942 Chicago, Illinois, U.S.
- Died: January 27, 2020 (aged 77)
- Education: University of Illinois in Chicago

Frank Anderson (February 1, 1942 – January 27, 2020) was an American intelligence officer and spymaster.

== Life and career ==
Anderson was born in Chicago. He attended the University of Illinois in Chicago, earning his bachelor's degree. He was a CIA officer.

Anderson was president of the Middle East Policy Council from 2009 to 2012.

Anderson died on January 27, 2020, at the age of 77.
