= Golok Chandra Goswami =

Indian academic (1923–2020)

- Born: 15 November 1923; Undived Nagaon, now Morigaon, Assam, British Raj
- Died: 24 January 2020 (aged 96); Guwahati, Assam, India

Dr. Golok Chandra Goswami (15 November 1923 – 24 January 2020) was an academician, journalist, linguist and litterateur from Assam, India. He joined the Assamese department at Gauhati University as a lecturer in 1954 and retired as a Professor and Head of the department in 1985. His book, An Introduction to Assamese Phonology, which was published in 1966, is regarded as an important contribution to the linguistic study of the Assamese language. He died on 24 January 2020 at the age of 96.

== Works ==
=== Books on linguistics ===
- ধ্বনিবিজ্ঞানৰ ভূমিকা, ১৯৬৬
- অসমীয়া বৰ্ণপ্ৰকাশ, ১৯৬৯
- অসমীয়া আখৰ-জোটনি, ১৯৭২
- অসমীয়া ব্যাকৰণৰ মৌলিক বিচাৰ, ১৯৮৭
- অসমীয়া গোলোক ব্যাকৰণ, প্ৰবোধ ভাগ, ১৯৭২ আৰু সুবোধ ভাগ, ১৯৭৪;
- ভাষা-ভাষণিকা, ১৯৯২
- An Introduction to Assamese Phonology, ১৯৬৬
- Structure of Assamese, ১৯৮৩

=== Editing ===
- সুধৰ্মাৰ উপাখ্যান (পদ্মাৱতী দেৱী ফুকননী), ১৯৬৭
- ধৰ্মনাথ বৰঠাকুৰ : শতবৰ্ষৰ স্মৃতি-অৰ্ঘ্য, ১৯৮৭ ভাৰতৰ মুক্তিযুদ্ধত পাণবাৰীত ৰেলগাড়ী বগৰোৱাৰ ইতিবৃত্ত (মহদানন্দ দেৱ গোস্বামী), ১৯৯৫
- Assamese, Its Formation and Development (Dr. Banikanta Kakati), ১৯৬২
- An Assamese Grammar, (Fr. O.Paviotti), ১৯৮৭
- Dr. Banikanta Kakati Commemoration Volume, ১৯৯৭

=== Dictionary ===
- Hindi-Assamese-English trilingual dictionary, 1985
- Hindi Asomiya Laghukosh (হিন্দী-অসমীয়া লঘুকোষ), 1985
- Bharatiyo Bhashakosh (ভাৰতীয় ভাষাকোষ), 1985

=== Translation ===
- ঈশ্বৰৰ বাণী, ১৯৯৩
- ব্যাকৰণ-মহাভাষ্য : পম্পশাহ্নিক (মহৰ্ষি পতঞ্জলি), ১৯৯৬

=== Other books ===
- মায়াং প্ৰসঙ্গ, ১৯৮৪
- ঠাকুৰব্ৰহ্ম হৰিদাস চৰিত, ১৯৮৭
- আনন্দ সাগৰ শ্ৰীকৃষ্ণ, ১৯৮৭
- পৰমাৰ্থকথা, ১৯৯৪

== Awards and honours ==
During his lifetime he received many awards and titles; these included the Ananda Ram Baruah Award in 2005 and the title of Asom Sahitya Sabha’s ‘Sahityacharya’ in 2002 and of ‘Bhashacharya’ in 2000.
