= Wen Zengxian =

Chinese politician (1952–2020)

- 文增显

Deputy director-general of the Civil Affairs Department of Hubei Province
- In office June 1997 – February 2010

Personal details
- Born: June 1952 Xinye County, Henan, China
- Died: 31 January 2020 (aged 67) Wuhan, Hubei, China
- Cause of death: COVID-19 (suspected)
- Party: Chinese Communist Party
- Education: Wuhan University

Chinese name
- Simplified Chinese: 文增显
- Traditional Chinese: 文增顯
Transcriptions
Standard Mandarin
- Hanyu Pinyin: Wén Zēngxiǎn

Wen Zengxian (Chinese: 文增显; pinyin: Wén Zēngxiǎn, June 1952 – 31 January 2020) was a Chinese politician who served as Deputy director-general of the Civil Affairs Department of Hubei Province from 1997 to 2010.

== Biography ==
Wen was born in Xinye County, Henan. In April 1972, he started to work at Xiangfan Municipal Propaganda Team. In January 1975, he worked as a clerk at Xiangfan Municipal Bureau of Culture. He joined the Chinese Communist Party in September 1976.

Wen entered Wuhan University in February 1977, majoring in Chinese Language and Literature. After earning his bachelor's degree in January 1980, he started to work at Politics Division of the Civil Affairs Department of Hubei Province. Later, he served as the President of Hubei Civil Administration School (December 1988 – January 1993), Director of the General Office of Hubei Provincial Commerce Department (January 1993 – June 1997), then the Deputy director-general of the Civil Affairs Department of Hubei Province (June 1997 – February 2010). He was appointed inspector of Civil Affairs Department since February 2010. He was also the President of Hubei Social Organization General Chamber of Commerce.

Wen died on 31 January 2020. His death was suspected of being caused by the COVID-19 infection. Many Chinese media (including Sina, Sohu, NetEase and Phoenix Television) had reported his death, however, the news was soon deleted due to censorship.
