= Melvin Seeman =

American social psychologist (1918–2020)

- Born: February 5, 1918; Baltimore, Maryland, U.S.
- Died: January 31, 2020 (aged 101); Malibu, California
- Education: Johns Hopkins University, Ohio State University
- Awards: 1996 Cooley-Mead Award from the American Sociological Association
- Scientific career
- Fields: Social psychology
- Workplaces: University of California, Los Angeles, Ohio State University

Melvin Seeman (February 5, 1918 – January 31, 2020) was an American social psychologist and emeritus professor of sociology at the University of California, Los Angeles (UCLA). He is known for researching social isolation. Seeman turned 100 in February 2018.

== Biography ==
Seeman was born in Baltimore, Maryland, and received his Ph.D. from Ohio State University in 1947. He subsequently taught at Ohio State for several years, and eventually became an associate professor there. He also served as the director of Ohio State's Operations Research Group from 1956 to 1958. In 1959, he joined the faculty at UCLA, where he chaired the sociology department from 1977 to 1980. He taught at UCLA for 29 years before he retired. He has been the editor-in-chief of Sociometry, associate editor of the American Sociological Review, and the president of the Pacific Sociological Association.

== Awards ==
In 1996, Seeman received the Cooley-Mead Award from the American Sociological Association's Section on Social Psychology.
