= R. Sathyanarayana =

Indian musicologist (1927–2020)

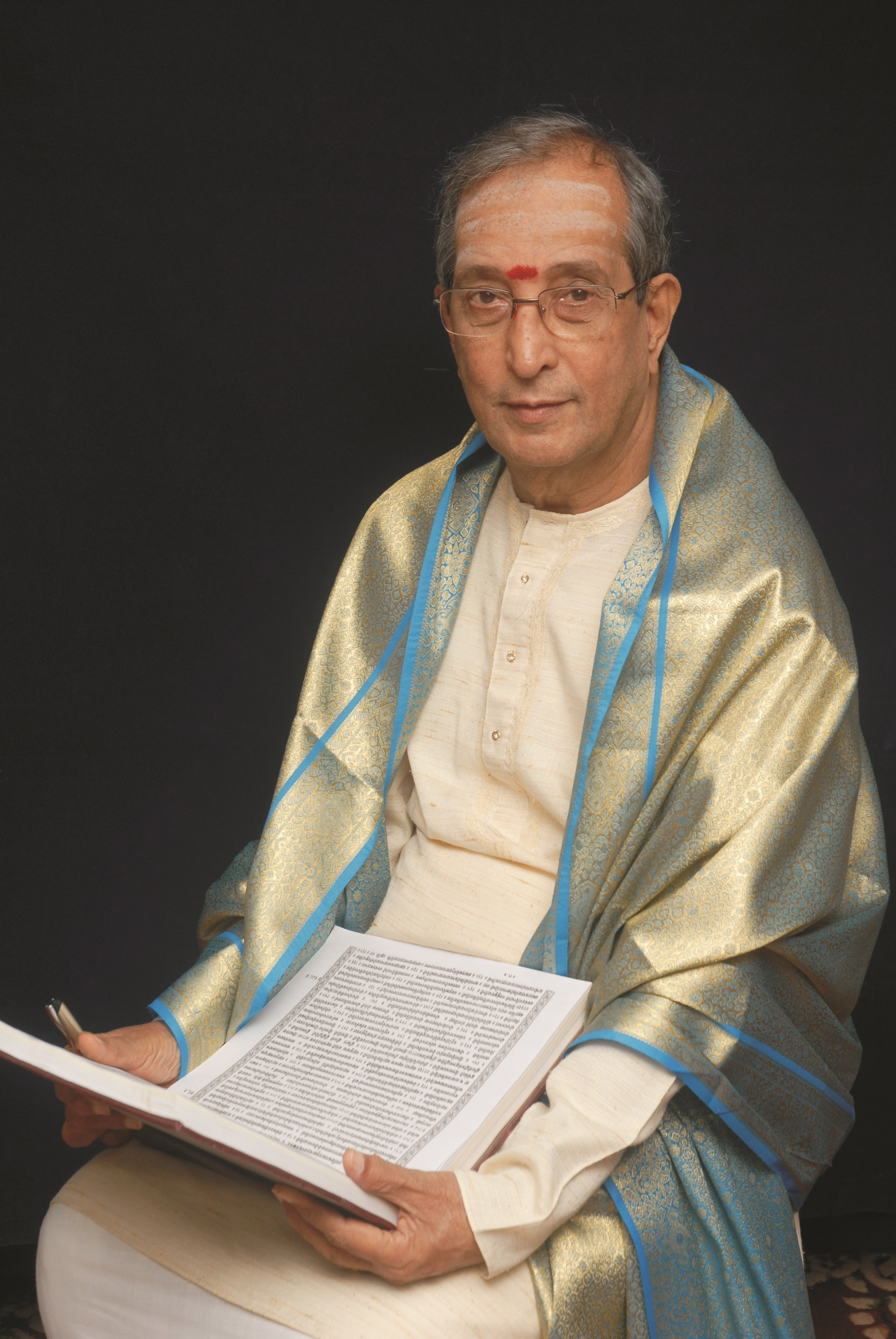
- Born: 9 May 1927; Mysore, India
- Died: 16 January 2020 (aged 92); Mysore
- Occupations: Musicologist & indologist
- Years active: 1945-2020
- Awards: Padma Sri (2018)

R. Sathyanarayana (9 May 1927 – 16 January 2020) was a musicologist and dance scholar from Mysore, India. In 2018, Sathyanarayana received the Padma Shri civilian honour from the President of India for his contribution to the field of music. His most prominent disciples include his son, Vidwan Dr. R. S. Nandakumar, who is a renowned Karnataka Classical vocal musician and scholar of international repute, and Vidwan Dr Srikantham Nagendra Shastry, who is also a renowned Karnataka Classical vocal musician, Professor and Scholar.

== Career ==
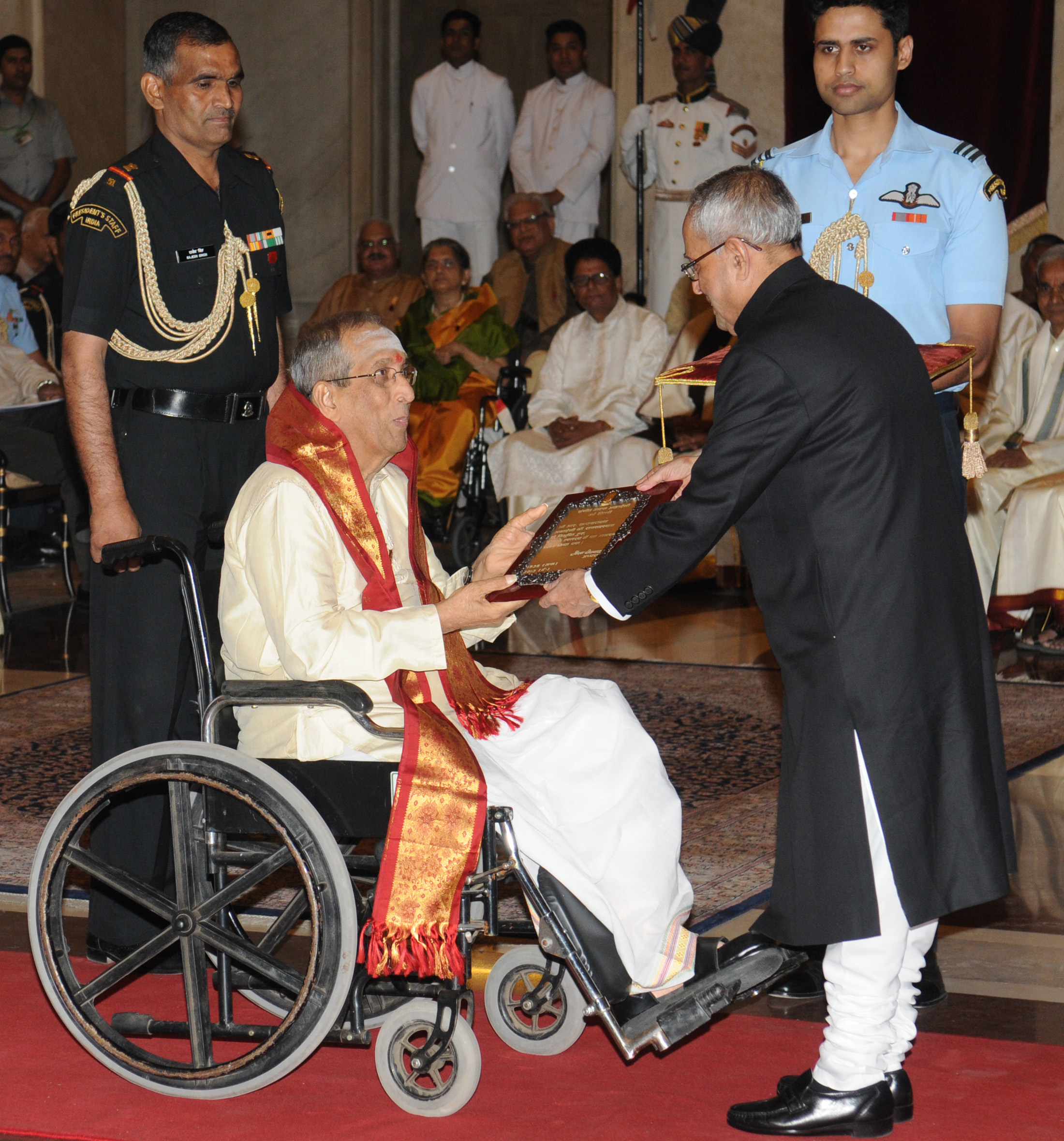
Pranab Mukherjee presenting an award to Shri R. Sathyanarayana in 2018

Dr R Sathyanarayana has degrees ranged from a Master's in chemistry from the University of Mysore to a PhD and multiple D.Litt. degrees from various universities, including Mysore University, Hampi University (Honoris Causa) and Gangubhai Hangal Music University of Mysore.

Between 1949 and 1984, he taught chemistry at the Sarada Vilas College, and also taught Karnataka music. He wrote treatises in Sanskrit language on dance and music. Pundarikamala, Shruti: The Scalic Foundation, Suladis and Ugabhogas of Karnataka Music, and Karnataka Sangeetha Vahini were some of his notable works. He was a public speaker on Indological disciplines, and was an active participant in Government of India sponsored music festivals and international seminars. He was the President of the Indian Music Congress.
