= Gerda Kieninger =

German politician (1951–2020)

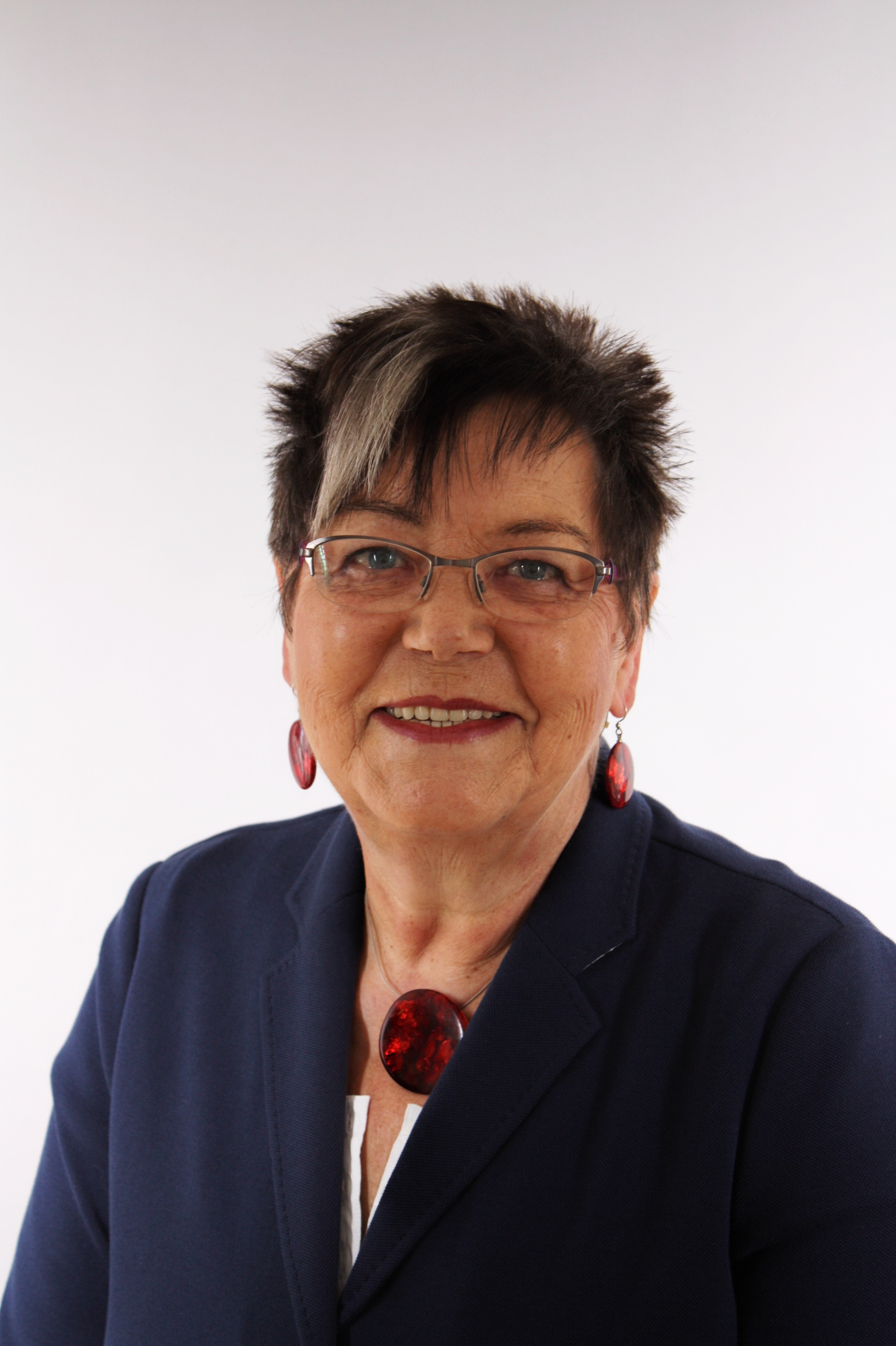

Gerda Kieninger (21 February 1951 – 22 January 2020) was a German politician. She was a member of the Social Democratic Party of Germany. She was born in Castrop-Rauxel, Germany. Kieninger was a member of the Landtag of North Rhine-Westphalia from 1995 to 2017.

Kieninger died in Cologne on 22 January 2020 at the age of 68 in Cologne, Germany at the age of 68.
