= Chen Suhou =

Chinese politician (1936–2020)

Chen Suhou (Chinese: 陈苏厚; November 1936 – 2 January 2020) was a Chinese politician. He served as Vice Governor of Hainan Province (1990–1997) in charge of agriculture and Vice Chairman of the Hainan Provincial People's Congress (1997–2003).

== Biography ==
Chen was born in November 1936 in Lingao County, Hainan (then part of Guangdong province), Republic of China. He entered the work force in August 1954 and joined the Chinese Communist Party in August 1956.

From 1954 to 1969 he worked in township (commune) governments in Lingao County, including Nanbao Township, Jialai Commune, Nanbao Commune, and Bohou Commune. He was promoted to serve in the county government in September 1969, and became the Chinese Communist Party Committee Secretary of Lingao County in October 1979, serving until 1983.

From 1983 to 1985, Chen studied at the Central Party School of the Chinese Communist Party, earning an associate degree. He subsequently served in the government of the Hainan Administrative Area of Guangdong province. After Hainan was elevated to a province, he served as Director of the Hainan Provincial Farm Reclamation Bureau (which was later restructured as a company) from 1988 to 1990.

In January 1990, Chen was promoted to Vice Governor of Hainan Province in charge of agriculture. He served in the position for seven years. From January 1997 to January 2003 he served as Vice Chairman of the Hainan Provincial People's Congress. He retired in December 2003. After his retirement, he returned to live in his hometown, Songmei Village in Nanbao, Lingao County, and helped develop the infrastructure and agriculture of the village.

Chen died on 2 January 2020 in Haikou, aged 83.
