= Lee Gelber =

American tour guide (1938–2020)

Lee Peter Gelber (February 8, 1938 – January 19, 2020) was an American tour guide and urban historian whose primary expertise was New York City and its environs.

== Early life ==
Gelber was born in Bronx, New York, where he was raised in the Fordham neighborhood by his parents Max Gelber and Rebecca Spiegel. He graduated from DeWitt Clinton High School and from Queens College, where he majored in history. He initially worked as a toy industry executive before going into the tour business following the occasion of the firm that he was working for having been subsumed by a larger entity in a merger.

== Professional career ==
With an earlier tenure as a Big Apple Greeter under his belt, he became a tour guide for Gray Line in 1994. His breadth of knowledge and tour guide finesse soon led him to become a trainer of other guides for Grayline and then a subsequent series of other outfits. Therein he was popularly known as the so-called (New York City) "Dean of Guides" and was referred to as such in reflective attribution by among other publications the Chicago Tribune and the New York Times. He was a co-president of The Guides Association of New York City (GANYC) (with Carol Ann Seidelman), an organization which honored him in March 2016 with their inaugural "Guiding Spirit Award" at the second annual apple awards. in 1993, while still a toy executive, Gelber was a contestant on the seniors edition of the American game show Jeopardy! and finished second on the episode in which he appeared with a total of $10,400.

Prior to his retirement in 2018, Gelber operated his own tour guide outfit, "Here is New York Tours", while also continuing to work with other firms.

On January 19, 2020, Gelber died in Schenectady, New York, from complications after having suffered a series of strokes. He was 81.
