= Ian Mathers =

Australian rules footballer (1930–2020)

Personal information
- Full name: Ian Wallace Mathers
- Born: 7 September 1930 (age 96)
- Original team: Blackburn
- Height: 183 cm (6 ft 0 in)
- Weight: 91 kg (201 lb)

Playing career^{1}
Years	Club	Games (Goals)
1951, 1953–54	Hawthorn	4 (0)
- ^{1} Playing statistics correct to the end of 1954.

Ian Mathers BEM (7 September 1930 – 16 January 2020) was an Australian rules footballer who played with Hawthorn in the Victorian Football League (VFL) and a big name in the Australian Brass Band community. One of the founders of the Victorian State Youth Band he has an award named after him in the Australian National Brass Band Championships and in 1981 he was awarded a British Empire Medal for services to brass banding in Australia.
