= Wendy Havran =

American immunologist (1955–2020)

Wendy Havran (September 1, 1955 – January 20, 2020) was an American immunologist at the Scripps Research Institute. She specialized in T cells, showing that they are scarce in certain areas of the body.

== Life ==
Havran was born in Houston, Texas, and would visit science museums and natural parks with her family. She attended Duke University, where she learned about immunology and received a bachelor's degree in zoology. Havran attended the University of Chicago and worked in the laboratory of Dr.Frank Fitch for her doctorate degrees. Havran completed her post-doctoral training with Dr. James P. Allison at the University of California. This is where she earned the Lucille P. Markey Scholar in Biomedical grant.

Havran opened her lab with Scripps in 1991. The research she started led her to γδT cells. These cells play a role in helping wounds heal.

Havran also served as a professor of dermatology at the University of California, San Diego. She also served as a member of the American Association of Immunologists. At Scripps, havran served as associate dean of the Skaggs graduate School of Chemical and Biological Sciences.

In 2002, she founded the Scripps Research's Summer Immunology Internship program for undergraduates and was director from 2004 to 2006. Due to her outstanding mentorship skills towards new trainees, she was named the 2018 Outstanding mentor by the Society of Fellows.

Havran died at the age of 64 on January 20, 2020, because of complications following a heart attack.

== Research ==
Havran's research has been centered in T-cell, especially epidermal T-cell's. She has made many contributions in the field in understanding the role of γδ T cell at epithelial barriers and how the immune system works.

Havran's research has included research in epithelial cells and how changes in these cells can trigger specific pathways affecting the immune system. This includes negative changes like inflammation due to misfolded proteins and positive changes such as avoidance of immunopathology. Havran's research found that negative impacts are due to the fact that some immune responses from foreign bodies cause cells to have negative impacts on the body. She has also investigated the role of T-cells in oily substances found in the skin. Her research found that sebum ( a hydrophobic substance secreted onto outermost layer of skin) may prevent self- reactive T-cells from being exposed to their antigens because of an epidermal skin barrier . More research is being done in this field.

Some of her research also includes data on Intraepithelial γδ T cells and how they interact with epithelial cells. Epithelial cells like skin cells are the first line of defense against microorganisms and this is done with T-cells. Havran's research shows that Intraepithelial cells can help epithelial cells with homeostasis, tissue repair, and inflammation. In mice, when there was an absence of these cells, dysregulation occurred showing that there is cross talk between epithelial cells & intraepithelial lymphocyte's.

Havran has also made significant discoveries such as that discrete γδ T cell subsets come from waves of progenitors. She also has done studies in tissue-resident dendritic epidemeral γδ T-cells that originated from the fetus and the benefits of these cells including wound healing. In addition, she has been involved in research concerning how γδ T cells can initiate a tumor- protective response. This was examined through the observation of epithelial tissues in mouse skin and the presence of T cells in immunosurveillance.

== Publications ==
Havran have published many papers on T-cells including those such as:

- Cross-talk between intraepithelial γδ T cells and epithelial cells
- Epithelial decision makers: in search of the 'epimmunome'
- [gamma][delta] T cells and IgE team up to prevent tumors
- JAML promotes CD8 and gamma 8 T cell antitumor immunity and is a novel target for cancer immunotherapy
- Oiling the wheels of autoimmunity
- The Role of Tissue-resident γδ T Cells in Stress Surveillance and Tissue Maintenance

== Honors and awards ==
- Lucille P. Markey Scholarship in Biomedical Science grant in 1989
- AAI Distinguished Service Award in 2018
- Outstanding Mentor by the Society of Fellows in 2018
- American Association of Immunologists Distinguished Fellows in 2019
