= Rollie Cook (Canadian football) =

Canadian football player

Profile
- Positions: Guard, Tackle

Personal information
- Born: February 6, 1934; Edmonton, Alberta
- Died: January 8, 2020 (aged 85)
- Listed height: 6 ft 3 in (1.91 m)
- Listed weight: 190 lb (86 kg)

Career history
- 1955–1956: Edmonton Eskimos

Awards and highlights
- Grey Cup champion (1955, 1956)

Roland Cook (February 6, 1934 – January 8, 2020) was a Canadian professional football player who played for the Edmonton Eskimos. He won the Grey Cup with the Eskimos in 1955 and 1956. Born in Edmonton, Alberta., he previously played football with the London, Ontario Royal Canadian Air Force team. Cook lives in White Rock, British Columbia where he is the White Rock Lawn Bowling Club president.
