= David Wildt =

American wildlife biologist (1950–2020)

David Edwin Wildt (March 12, 1950 – January 15, 2020) was an American wildlife biologist, who worked at the Smithsonian Institution's National Zoo and Conservation Biology Institute (SCBI) for almost 40 years. He pioneered research in wildlife reproductive physiology, and became instrumental in rescuing species which would have otherwise gone extinct due to dwindling population sizes. The species he may have helped "save" from extinction included cheetahs, lions, African antelopes, black-footed ferrets, while his work included first time artificial inseminations of the clouded leopard, puma, snow leopard, tiger, Eld's deer, scimitar-horned oryx, Persian onager, and the Przewalski's horse.

== Early life and education ==
Wildt was born in Jacksonville, Illinois on March 12, 1950. He received a BS from Illinois State University in 1972, then went on to Michigan State University for his graduate work. He completed a master's in animal husbandry in 1973, and a PhD in physiology and animal husbandry in 1975.

== Selected publications ==
- Wildt, David E., Mitchell Bush, KLn Goodrowe, Craig Packer, A. E. Pusey, J. L. Brown, P. Joslin, and Stephen J. O'Brien. "Reproductive and genetic consequences of founding isolated lion populations." Nature 329, no. 6137 (1987): 328–331.
- O'Brien, Stephen J., Melody E. Roelke, L. Marker, A. Newman, C. A. Winkler, D. Meltzer, L. Colly, J. F. Evermann, M. Bush, and David E. Wildt. "Genetic basis for species vulnerability in the cheetah." Science 227, no. 4693 (1985): 1428–1434.
