= Jiang Hongde =

Chinese engineer (1942–2020)

- Born: July 4, 1942; Hengyang, Hunan, China
- Died: January 4, 2020 (aged 77); Beijing, China
- Resting place: Babaoshan Revolutionary Cemetery
- Education: Tsinghua University; University of Science and Technology of China
- Scientific career
- Fields: Turbomachine; Power engineering
- Workplaces: Tsinghua University

Chinese name
- Traditional Chinese: 蔣洪德
- Simplified Chinese: 蒋洪德
Transcriptions
Standard Mandarin
- Hanyu Pinyin: Jiǎng Hóngdé

Jiang Hongde (Chinese: 蒋洪德; 4 July 1942 – 4 January 2020) was a Chinese engineer and professor at Tsinghua University.

== Early life and education ==
Jiang was born in Hengyang, Hunan, Republic of China (1912-1949), on July 4, 1942, while his ancestral home was in Changsha. He attended Changsha No.1 High School. He received his bachelor's degree from Tsinghua University in 1968 and his master's degree from University of Science and Technology of China in 1981, respectively.

== Career ==
After university, he worked at Qingdao Steam Turbine Factory between March 1968 and September 1978. In July 1981 he joined the Institute of Engineer Thermophysics, Chinese Academy of Engineering as a researcher, and served until November 2004. From 1987 to 1989 he was a visiting scholar at Virginia Tech. He joined the Chinese Communist Party in December 1992. In November 2004 he became a professor and doctoral supervisor at Tsinghua University.

== Death ==
On January 4, 2020, he died of illness in Beijing.

== Honors and awards ==
- 1999 Member of the Chinese Academy of Engineering (CAE)
