= Carl Holm =

Danish footballer (1927–2020)

Personal information
- Full name: Carl Leo Leegaard Holm
- Date of birth: 14 September 1927
- Place of birth: Copenhagen, Denmark
- Date of death: 24 January 2020 (aged 92)
- Place of death: Måløv, Denmark
- Position: Forward

Senior career*
Years	Team	Apps	(Gls)
- B 1903
- * Club domestic league appearances and goals

Carl Leo Leegaard Holm (14 September 1927 – 24 January 2020) was a Danish footballer. He was part of Denmark's squad at the 1952 Summer Olympics, but he did not play in any matches.
