= Hergo =

French photographer (1951–2020)

- Born: Henri Godineau; 20 July 1951; Cholet, France
- Died: 28 January 2020 (aged 68); Paris, France
- Occupation: Photographer

Henri "Hergo" Godineau (20 July 1951 – 28 January 2020) was a French photographer who began his career in the 1970s. He lived and worked in Paris, France.

== Biography ==
In 1978, he began working on the photo album Two children on the way, which highlighted the first 20 years of the newspaper Libération. Many of Hergo's photo albums dealt with youth, love, death, gender, cinema, art, and intimacy. In 1995, he became a resident of the International City of the Arts, which allowed him to visit artist studios much more frequently. Hergo held a large amount of photographic expositions throughout his career. He died on 28 January 2020.

== Publications and collections ==
- Mille Publishing Postcards (1983)
- First deposit of works at the BNF (1983)
- Air France / City of Paris Price (1984)
- Japanese magazine portfolio (1985)
- Portfolio Photographies magazine (1985)
- Portfolio éditions Autrement (1986)
- Poster Flammarion 4 (1987)
- Vis-à-Vis International Portfolio (1988)
- Vis-à-Vis international Photo (1990)
- Catalog of the exhibition "Screens / Icons of Le Blanc (Indre) at the contemporary art space Art Brenne" (1991)
- Acquisition par le conseil général du Pas-de-Calais de la série «Ciné Spectator» (1994)
- Acquisition by the Pas-de-Calais General Council of the “Ciné Spectator” series (1994)
- Contrejour Portfolio (1995)
- Commissions and illustrations for the newspaper Liberation (1985–1997)
- Vis-à-Vis International Portfolio (1998)
- Acquisition of portraits of artists by the BNF (2004)
- Important donation of silver prints to the National Library of France (2012)
- Donation of 65 photographs from the “Artists” series to the Kandinsky Library (2014)
- Donation of 24 photographs from the “Mythos” series and 12 photographs from the “Alterations” series (2014)
