= Boken Ete =

Indian politician (1922–2020)

Arunachal Pradesh Legislative Assembly
- In office 1978–1980
- Preceded by: Constituency Established
- Succeeded by: Tumpak Ete
- Constituency: Along South

Personal details
- Born: 1 March 1922
- Died: 8 January 2020 (aged 97)

Boken Ete (1 March 1922 – 8 January 2020) was an Indian politician and civil servant from Arunachal Pradesh. He was a legislator of the Arunachal Pradesh Legislative Assembly.

== Biography ==
Ete was born on 1 March 1922 at Bene in West Siang. He started his career as a member of the Agency Labour Corps in 1944. He worked on various posts on it.

Ete was conferred with Assam Governor's Earthquake Relief Fund Medal for his relief work after Assam earthquake in 1950. He also received Assam Governor's Commendation Certificate in 1958 and Lt. Governor's Commendation Certificate 1978. He was elected as a legislator of the Arunachal Pradesh Legislative Assembly as an independent candidate from Along South in 1978.

Ete died on 8 January 2020 at the age of 97.
