= Frank L. Clarke =

Australian business economist (1933–2020)

Francis Lewis Clarke (26 November 1933 – 1 January 2020) was an Australian business economist who was emeritus Professor of Accounting at University of Newcastle. He is best known for his 1997 publication of "Corporate collapse: Regulatory, accounting and ethical failure."

Clarke received his BEc and his PhD, and has been Professor of Accounting at University of Newcastle. After his retirement he was made Honorary Professor at the University of Sydney Business School. Clarke was former editor of Abacus, and co-author of The Routledge Companion to Accounting History, and the History of accounting: An international Encyclopedia.

Clarke died on 1 January 2020, at the age of 86.

== Selected publications ==
- Clarke, Frank L., and Graeme W. Dean. Contributions of Limperg and Schmidt to the Replacement Cost Debate in the 1920s. Garlan, 1990.
- Clarke, F. L., Dean, G. W., Oliver, K. G., & Clarke, F. L. (1997). Corporate collapse: Regulatory, accounting and ethical failure. Cambridge: Cambridge University Press.

Articles, a selection:

- Clarke, Frank L., and Graeme W. Dean. "Schmidt's Betriebswirtschaft theory." Abacus 22.2 (1986): 65–102.
- Craig, Russell J., Frank L. Clarke, and Joel H. Amernic. "Scholarship in university business schools-Cardinal Newman, creeping corporatism and farewell to the “disturber of the peace”?." Accounting, Auditing & Accountability Journal 12.5 (1999): 510-524.
- Walker, R. G., Frank L. Clarke, and G. W. Dean. "Reporting on the state of infrastructure by local government." Accounting, Auditing & Accountability Journal 12.4 (1999): 441–459.
- Walker, Robert G., Frank L. Clarke, and Graeme W. Dean. "Options for infrastructure reporting." Abacus 36.2 (2000): 123–159.
- Dean, Graeme W., and Frank L. Clarke. "An evolving conceptual framework?." Abacus 39.3 (2003): 279–297.
