= Marilyn Lanfear =

American sculptor and performance artist (1930–2020)

- Born: December 27, 1930; Waco, TX
- Died: January 19, 2020
- Education: University of Texas at San Antonio, University of Texas at Austin
- Occupation: Artists

Marilyn Lanfear (December 27, 1930 - January 19, 2020) was an American sculptor and performance artist.

== Life ==
Lanfear was born in Waco, Texas, and raised in Corpus Christi. She earned her bachelor's degree at the University of Texas and received an MFA from the University of Texas San Antonio in 1978. She married, raised a family, and lived in New York City for some years. After her return to Texas, she became a resident of San Antonio, where she showed much of her work.

== Work ==
Her work has been shown in many venues in Texas, as well as some outside the United States. Her art is strongly autobiographical and sociological. Her work is also influenced by the theme of family. Her works are exhibited in the permanent collections of the San Antonio Museum of Art and the Crystal Bridges Museum of American Art.
