= Ron Rogers (cartoonist) =

American cartoonist (1954–2020)

- Born: May 13, 1954; Richmond, Virginia, U.S.
- Died: January 7, 2020 (aged 65)
- Education: J. Sargeant Reynolds Community College; Virginia Commonwealth University
- Occupation: Cartoonist
- Spouse: Donna Whitaker Rogers

Ronald L. Rogers (May 13, 1954 – January 7, 2020) was an African-American political cartoonist, designer, and illustrator. His work was published in Richmond Planet from 1980 to 1988, in books and greeting cards throughout his career, in the South Bend Tribune until 2010, and in the Winston-Salem Chronicle from 2014 to 2018. Rogers died at age 65 due to sudden illness.

== Early life ==
Ron Rogers was born on May 13, 1954, in Richmond, Virginia, where he grew up and lived for most of his life. Rogers began showing his passion and talent for art at a young age, where he began creating his first comic series. He graduated from Maggie L Walker High School in 1974 and attended both Virginia Commonwealth University and J. Sargeant Reynolds Community College, where he studied art, history, and politics.

== Career ==
Ron Rogers began his career as a freelancer for The Richmond Afro-American and Planet in 1980. His works were published in said magazine thought 1988. Throughout his entire career, Rogers' works appeared in publications all across the South. In 2005, Rogers joined the South Bend Tribune following many instances of freelance work for the paper since 2002. He was laid off in 2010. Throughout his career, Rogers designed cards and graphics that appears across the US. He played the role of graphics editor, graphics director, and assistant design editor at many newspapers in Indiana, Alabama, and Louisiana.

In 2014, Ron Rogers joined the Winston-Salem Chronicle as a cartoonist and designer, where he worked until 2018 when he retired. After retirement, Rogers continued to freelance for the same newspaper until his death in 2020.

== Awards and honors ==
- Three Statewide Editorial Cartoonist Awards in Louisiana
- Two Statewide Editorial Cartoonist Awards in Indiana
- National Recognition for Cartooning in the Suburban Newspapers of America
- Various Illustration Awards
- Featured in Editor & Publisher
