= Giovanny Romero Infante =

Peruvian journalist (1988–2020)

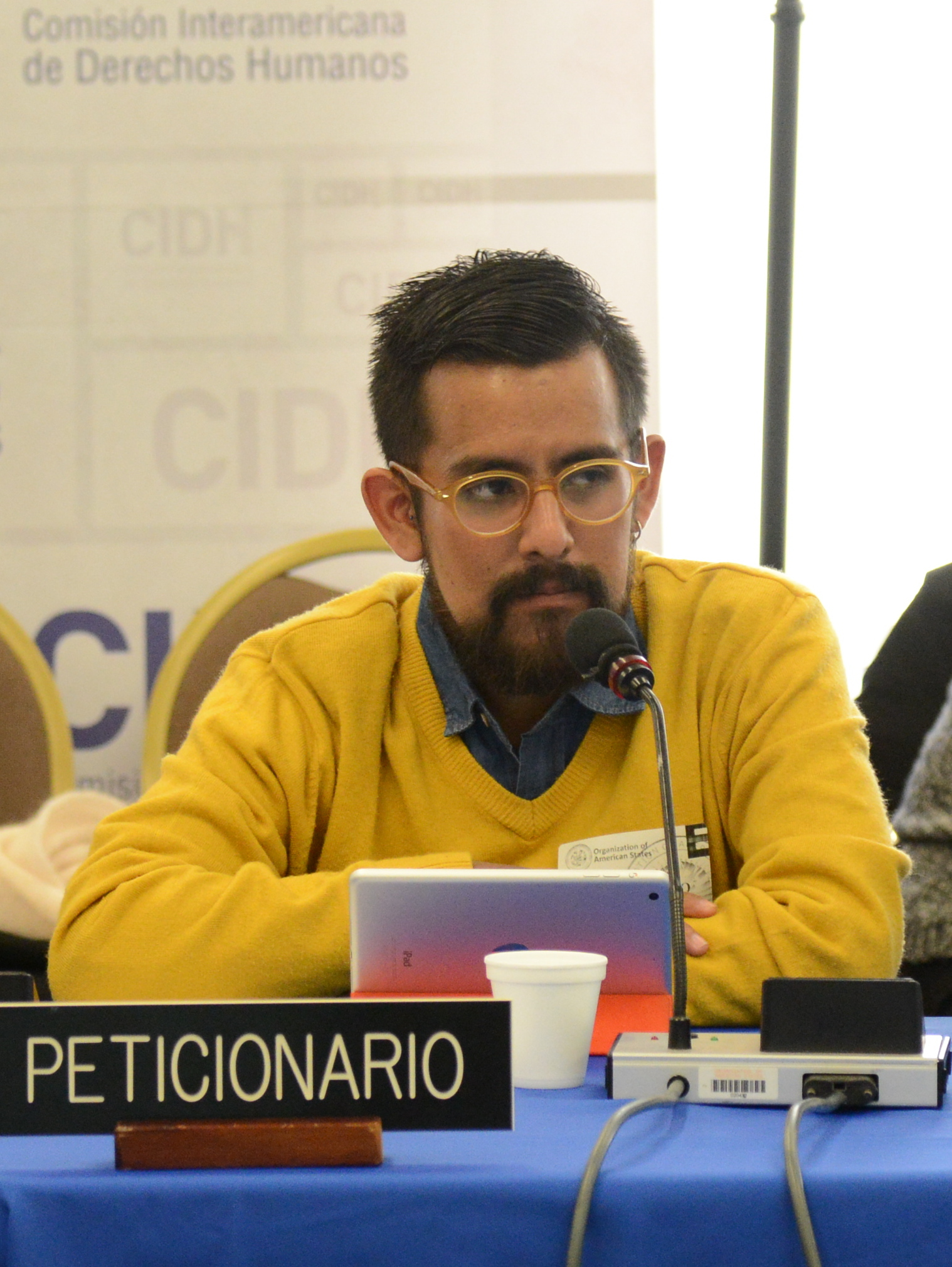
- Infante in 2015
- Born: 18 September 1988
- Died: 24 January 2020 (aged 31)
- Other names: Gio Infante
- Occupations: Journalist, LGBT activist

Giovanny Romero Infante, also known as Gio Infante, (18 September 1988 – 24 January 2020) was a Peruvian journalist and LGBT activist.

Infante was well known, from Peru to the United States, for his advocacy on behalf of sexual minorities. Infante was the executive director of the Homosexual Movement of Lima.

== See also ==
LGBT rights in Peru
