= Leonard Woodley =

British barrister (1927–2020)

Leonard Gaston Woodley QC (13 September 1927 – 19 January 2020) was a British barrister. He became the first person in Britain of Afro-Caribbean heritage to become a Queen's Counsel, Recorder of the Crown Court and a bencher of Inner Temple.

== Biography ==
Woodley was born in Port of Spain, Trinidad and Tobago, the son of Leonard Woodley, a bandleader, and his wife, Ethel Owen Fleming, a businesswoman. He attended Saint Mary's College and thereafter became first a clerk and later a commercial administrator.

In 1960 he moved to the United Kingdom to study law. He studied at the University of London and was called to the bar at Inner Temple in 1963. He began his legal career working at the chambers of Dingle Foot. At the bar he specialised in criminal defence, and often appeared in trials with a political or civil liberties element. He was involved in many of the famous race trials of the 20th century, including those related to the Mangrove Nine trial, 1981 Brixton riot, 1980 St Pauls riot, Broadwater Farm riot. He was instructed in the Scarman inquiry, chaired the Laudat inquiry into mental health, and sat on the Royal Commission on long term care for the elderly.

In 1988 he was made Queen's Council, and between 1988 and 2000 he was head of 8KBW and 1MCB Chambers. In 1988, he invited Nelson Mandela to be an honorary door tenant of Chambers, as a mark of solidarity with the South African freedom struggle. He endowed the Leonard Woodley Scholarship at the Inner Temple, to be given to black or Asian pupils with a view to promoting greater diversity at the Bar. He served as a Recorder between 1989 and 2000 and was elected as a Barrister Governing Bencher of Inner Temple in 1990.

Woodley lived in Hampstead, London, and died on 19 January 2020. He was predeceased in 1990s by his much loved only child and son who died in a tragic accident on London Underground.
