= Bruce Haywood =

American educator (1925–2020)

- Born: 30 September 1925; York, England
- Died: 7 January 2020 (aged 94); Galesburg, Illinois, United States
- Known for: Applicability of Liberal Arts education in the 20th century

Academic background
- Education: University of Leeds; McGill University; Harvard University
- Thesis: A study of imagery in the works of Novalis (1956)
- Doctoral advisor: Stuart Atkins

Academic work
- Discipline: German language and literature
- Notable works: Novalis, the veil of imagery; a study of the poetic works of Friedrich von Hardenberg, 1772–1801 's-Gravenhage: Mouton, 1959; Cambridge, Mass.: Harvard University Press, 1959.

Bruce Haywood (30 September 1925 – 7 January 2020) was an English-born American academic, who served as a professor of German language and literature, dean and provost of Kenyon College and was president of Monmouth College in Illinois. He died in Galesburg, Illinois in 2020 at the age of 94.

== Early life and education ==
Born in York, England in 1925, Haywood was raised in Allerton Bywater, Yorkshire. He served with the British Army intelligence corps near Bremerhaven in northern Germany for twenty-seven months at the end of World War II, then attended the University of Leeds. He then went on to McGill University, where he studied under Willem Graff for his bachelor's and master's degrees in 1950. He then moved on to Harvard University, where he completed his doctorate under Stuart Atkins in 1956 with a thesis on "A study of imagery in the works of Novalis."

== Academic career ==
From 1954 to 1963, Haywood served as a professor of German language and literature at Kenyon College, after having been recruited by the school's president, Gordon Keith Chalmers.

In 1959, Harvard University Press published his work titled: Novalis, the veil of imagery; a study of the poetic works of Friedrich von Hardenberg, 1772–1801.

From 1963 to 1980, he served as Kenyon College dean and provost. In 1980 he was appointed as the tenth president of Monmouth College, a position he held until his retirement in 1994.

== Published works ==
- Novalis, the veil of imagery; a study of the poetic works of Friedrich von Hardenberg, 1772–1801 's-Gravenhage: Mouton, 1959; Cambridge, Mass.: Harvard University Press, 1959.
- The Essential College, Gambier, OH: XOXOX Press, 2006
- Allerton Bywater: A Yorkshire Boyhood, Gambier, OH: XOXOX Press, 2007
- Bremerhaven: A Memoir of Germany, 1945–1947, Nantucket, MA: EditAndPublishYourBook.com/ Lulu; 1st edition (21 September 2010)
