= Gudrun Lund =

Danish composer (1930–2020)

Gudrun Lund (22 April 1930 – 14 January 2020) was a Danish composer. She was born in Aalborg and studied music, German and English at the Copenhagen Conservatory. After graduating, she took a position teaching at the Copenhagen Day and Evening College of Education (KDAS).

Lund began composing in 1975 at the age of 45. At that time she continued her studies in composition with Svend S. Schultz and Mogens Winkel Holm. In 1983-4 she studied at Hartt College of Music, University of Hartford in West Hartford, Connecticut, USA.

== Works ==
Lund has composed over a hundred works in several genres. Selected compositions include:

- Three Pieces for Horn
- Piano Trio op. 67
- Five Dialogues
- Six Duos Op.40 for trumpet
- Clarinet Trio for clarinet, viola and piano
- Talks, op. 136 for flute, clarinet and bassoon (I. Learning something II. Politicians III. Sad news IV. Solving problems)

Her music has been recorded and issued on CD, including:

- New Danish Woodwind Music Audio CD (July 1, 1997) Paula Records, ASIN: B00000I5BH
- 10 Tankevaekkende udsagn [10 suggestive ulterances], for female voice, flute, cello and accordion (1994) FA2351-WARM Quartet CD Danacord DACOCD423 (1995)
