= Ding Xieping =

Chinese mathematician (1938–2020)

Ding Xieping (Chinese: 丁协平; 16 April 1938 – 4 January 2020) was a Chinese mathematician and a professor at Sichuan Normal University. He served as Director of the Institute of Mathematics at the university.

== Biography ==
Ding was born on 16 April 1938 in Zigong, Sichuan, Republic of China. After graduating from Sichuan University in 1961, he taught as an assistant professor at the Department of Mathematics of the former Chengdu University (now Southwestern University of Finance and Economics).

In 1964, Ding transferred to Sichuan Normal University, where he taught until his retirement in 2010. He served as Director of the university's Institute of Mathematics. His research focus was nonlinear analysis and applications. Starting in 1979, he published more than 360 research papers, including 160 on Science Citation Index (SCI) journals. In 1999 and 2000, he was China's most prolific authors of papers on SCI journals in the field of mathematics.

He was named a National Outstanding Scientist in 1986 and was awarded a special pension for distinguished scholars by the State Council of the People's Republic of China. He was named a National Outstanding Teacher in 2001.

Ding died on 4 January 2020, aged 81.
