= Ken Fuson =

American journalist (1956–2020)

- Born: June 23, 1956
- Died: January 3, 2020 (aged 63); Omaha, Nebraska, U.S.
- Education: University of Missouri
- Occupation: Journalist

Ken Fuson (June 23, 1956 – January 3, 2020) was an American journalist for The Baltimore Sun and The Des Moines Register.

== Life ==
Fuson was born in 1956 and he grew up in Granger, Iowa. He dropped out of the University of Missouri and became a journalist.

Fuson began his career at the Columbia Daily Tribune. He worked for The Des Moines Register from 1981 to 1995, The Baltimore Sun from 1995 to 1999, and The Des Moines Register once again from 1999 to 2008. Over the course of his career, Fuson won "more than 40 national and state writing awards", including one from the American Society of News Editors.

Fuson died of liver failure on January 3, 2020, in Omaha, Nebraska, at age 63.
