= Hiroshi Suzuki (trombonist) =

Japanese American jazz trombonist (1933–2020)

Hiroshi Suzuki 鈴木 弘
- Suzuki as depicted on Cat (1976)

Background information
- Born: November 12, 1933; Yokohama, Kanagawa, Japan
- Died: January 16, 2020 (aged 86) Las Vegas, Nevada, U.S.
- Genres: Jazz
- Occupations: Musician; trombonist
- Instrument: Trombone
- Label: Columbia

Hiroshi Suzuki (鈴木 弘, Suzuki Hiroshi; November 12, 1933 – January 16, 2020) was a Japanese American jazz trombonist and musical artist most well known for his 1976 album Cat.

== Career ==
Suzuki moved to the United States at 38 to play with bandleader and drummer Buddy Rich. During this time, Suzuki lived in Las Vegas. In 1975, he returned to Japan, recording the five tracks on his album Cat during October the same year at Nippon Columbia Studio in Tokyo. The album was released on February 26, 1976. After release, the album didn't receive any notable acclaim, flopping in sales in Japan, and Suzuki experienced little to no recognition throughout his career. However, 39 years later in 2015, Columbia Records re-released the album in Japan to bring it to a wider audience. In the 21st century, the album has received light critical acclaim, and has found somewhat of a cult following amongst listeners of Japanese jazz, receiving recognition for its laid-back production and catchy rhythm. Cat was praised by The Vinyl Factory in 2021. "Romance" was included on the WaJazz album series, becoming his most well-known track across multiple music platforms and receiving over 11 million views on YouTube. A posthumous music video for "Romance" was released in 2023.

== Personal life ==
Suzuki died on January 16, 2020, in Las Vegas at the age of 86.

== Discography ==
=== Studio albums ===
- Variation (1969) (Hiroshi Suzuki & Masahiko Togashi Quintet)
- Up Up and Away (1969) (Hiroshi Suzuki & His Happy Cats)
- Trombone Standard Deluxe (1969)
- Trombone Deluxe (1970)
- Cat (1976)
