= John Post =

American philosopher

- Born: August 26, 1936; Madison, Wisconsin
- Died: January 6, 2020 (aged 83); Nashville, Tennessee

Academic background
- Education: University of California, Berkeley (PhD), University of Wisconsin (MA), Harvard University (BA)

Academic work
- Discipline: Philosophy
- Main interests: logic, metaphysics

John Frederic Post (August 26, 1936 - January 6, 2020) was an American philosopher and Professor of Philosophy, emeritus at Vanderbilt University. He was the Whichard Distinguished Chair of the Humanities at East Carolina University (1996-97).

== Publications ==
=== Books ===
- From Nature to Norm: An Essay in the Metaphysics of Morals, BookSurge (2008)
- The Faces of Existence: An Essay in Nonreductive Metaphysics. Ithaca: Cornell UP, 1987.
- Metaphysics: A Contemporary Introduction. New York: Paragon House, 1991.

=== Journal articles ===
- "Naturalism, Reduction and Normativity: Pressing from Below," forthcoming in Philosophy and Phenomenological Research.
- "Method, Madness, and Normativity"Philo, forthcoming (2004)
- "Reply to Gale and Pruss" Philo, forthcoming (2004)
- "Omniscience, Weak PSR, and Method" Philo, 6 (2003), 33–48
- "Sense and Supervenience." Philo. Fall Wint 01; 4(2): 123–137.
- (with Derek Turner) "Sic Transitivity: Reply to McGrew and McGrew." Journal of Philosophical Research. Ja 2000; 25: 67–82.
- "Is Supervenience Asymmetric?" Manuscrito. O 99; 22(2): 305–344.
- "Post-Quinean Philosophical Investigations," Quine and Wittgenstein. Edited by Robert Arrington and Hans-Johann Glock. New York: Routledge, 1996. pp. 252–279.
- "The Foundationalism in Irrealism, and the Immorality." Journal of Philosophical Research. Ja 96; 21: 1–14.
- "Epistemology." Discourse on the Method and Meditations on First Philosophy. Edited by David Weissman. New Haven: Yale UP, 1996.
- "Perspectives on Buchler." Metaphilosophy. Jl 95; 26(3): 279–299.
- ""Global" Supervenient Determination: Too Permissive?" Supervenience: New Essays. Edited by Elias E. Savellos. Cambridge: Needham Heights, 1995.
- "Objective Value, Realism, and the End of Metaphysics." Journal of Speculative Philosophy. 1990; 4(2): 147–160.
- "Paradox in Critical Rationalism and Related Theories." Evolutionary Epistemology. Edited by Gerard Radnitzky. La Salle: Open Court, 1987.
- "A Godelian Theorem for Theories of Rationality." Evolutionary Epistemology. Edited by Gerard Radnitzky. La Salle: Open Court, 1987.
- "On the Determinacy of Valuation." Philosophical Studies. MY 84; 45: 315–334.
- "On the Determinacy of Truth and Translation." Southern Journal of Philosophy. SUPP 83; 22: 117–136.
- "Response: "Comment on Paul Teller's 'A Poor Man's Guide To Supervience and Determination." Southern Journal of Philosophy. SUPP 83; 22: 163–167.
- "Infinite Regress of Justification and of Explanation." Philosophical Studies. JL 80; 38: 31–52.
- "Presupposition, Bi-valence and the Possible Liar." Philosophia. O 79; 8: 645–650.
- "Shades of Possibility." Journal of Philosophical Logic. AP 74; 3: 155–158.
- "Propositions, Possible Languages and The Liar's Revenge." British Journal for the Philosophy of Science. S 74; 25: 223–234.
- "New Foundations for Philosophical Theology: Quine with God." Journal of Philosophy. 7 NOV 74; 71: 736–748.
- "Shades of the Liar." Journal of Philosophical Logic. JL 73; 2: 370–385.
- "Referential Presupposition." Australasian Journal of Philosophy. AG 72; 50: 160–167.
- "The Possible Liar." Nous. N 70; 4: 405–409.
- "An Analysis of Presupposing." Southern Journal of Philosophy. FALL 68; 6: 167–171.
- "Special Reasons and Specific Answers." Analysis. JA 65; 25: 86–93.
- "Does Knowing Make a Difference to What Is Known?" Philosophical Quarterly. JL 65; 15: 220-228
