= Kevin Thompson (karate) =

American karateka (1962–2020)

- Born: 1962; Newark, New Jersey, US
- Died: January 8, 2020 (aged 57–58); West Orange, New Jersey, US
- Other names: Lil K.A.
- Style: Karate
- Teacher: Karriem Abdallah

Other information
- Spouse: Shena
- Children: 6

Kevin Brown Thompson (1962 – January 8, 2020) was an American world champion of karate. Thompson was referred to in his early years of fighting as Lil K.A. named after his teacher Karriem Abdallah. At the age of 14, Thompson had an article in Black Belt Magazine. Kevin was inducted into the 1988 Black Belt Magazine Hall of Fame as the Co-Competitor of the Year.

== Martial arts competitive career ==
Since the early '70s, Thompson had amassed well over 1000 trophies from local and international martial arts competitions, possibly closer to 2000. He fought in the Professional Karate League in the mid 1990s and was known as a forms and sparring star. Under the Budweiser Karate Team, The Atlantic Team and Team Paul Mitchell, he would compete in and win in major tournaments such as the Players Cup, Diamond National, Battle of Atlanta, Binns Galaxy of Stars(prior to team affiliation), U.S. Open, B.I.G aka Bermuda Internationals, Atlantic Events, Bluegrass Nationals and Ocean State Grand Nationals. Thompson was the winner of the elusive triple crown, the winner of sparring, forms, and weapons. Thompson entered into mixed martial arts and had a 3-1 record in professional matches. He also had an amateur MMA record of 4-1.

== Martial Arts teaching ==
Thompson taught out of a dojo in New Jersey. He had a team of performers he calls Shakil’s Warriors. He instructed students on the physical and psychological aspects of competitive fighting. He suffered from ALS but continued to teach karate until no longer able to do so.

== Personal life ==
Thompson was married to Shena and had 6 children. He served as a spokesman pushing for a cure for ALS. Thompson died aged 58 on January 8, 2020, from amyotrophic lateral sclerosis (ALS).
