= Houston Hogg =

American football player (1948–2020)

Houston Hogg (March 2, 1948 – January 2, 2020) was an American football player at the University of Kentucky and the Southeastern Conference. Hogg was one among four of the first African American athletes to play college level football at the University of Kentucky, as well as the Southeastern Conference alongside Greg Page, Nate Northington and Wilbur Hackett.

== Early life ==
Houston Hogg was born on March 2, 1948, to his father Houston Hogg Sr. and his mother Margaret L. Hogg in the city of Hazard, Kentucky. In high school, Hogg would go on to play American football in the linebacker and quarterback for Hazard High School. During his junior year of high school, Hogg and his family would move to Daviess County High School in Owensboro, Kentucky where Hogg would play for the remainder of his high school career. According to Hogg, despite the current political atmosphere of the times, he never experienced overt racism during his time at either high school. During his junior year, Hogg would begin to hear scholarship offers from colleges around the state. His excellent high school football career would net him a scholarship to play for the University of Kentucky, where he'd major in Special Education.

Upon arriving at the University of Kentucky, Hogg would be faced with rising racial prejudice. As he was among only four African American players on the university's team, Hogg would become a target of racism by his teammates and his peers. Despite this, Hogg played for the University of Kentucky for three seasons. During his 31 games and 3 seasons at the University of Kentucky, Hogg would total 245 yards, 2 touchdowns on 92 carries, and 135 yards on 20 receptions.

After completing his studies at the university, Hogg moved back to Owensboro, Kentucky, where he'd work at AEP Rockport Power Plant, and marry his wife Deborah Hogg. Houston Hogg would eventually return to college and pursue a bachelor's degree in Bible from the Great Commission Bible College. In 1991, Hogg and his wife would begin fostering children, eventually fostering over 200 children.

Houston Hogg died on January 2, 2020, of old age at Owensboro Health Regional Hospital.

== Athletic career ==
In 1967, Houston Hogg began his career as one of the four African American players on the University of Kentucky football team. His first debut on the field, was against the University of Mississippi. This was just a week after the historic debut of Nate Northington, the first African American to play football in the Southeastern Conference.

The former defensive and running back at Kentucky, totaled two touch downs throughout his career. Hogg rushed 92 times for 245 yards, lettering in both 1969 and 1970.

== Legacy ==
Houston Hogg is a key player among those who helped break the color barrier in the Southeastern Conference. Throughout his time at Kentucky, he embraced his individuality and looked past the unwelcoming political atmosphere that surrounded him. For those that knew Hogg, they recognized him for his optimistic attitude towards the many burdens he carried on his back throughout his athletic career. He carried himself with grace, and allowed his passion for football to drive away any negativity or criticism. He accounted on multiple occasions, the prejudice he experienced within his own teammates and the blatant acts of disrespect towards him from opposing teams.

Hogg was never a quitter. In fact, he decided to leave Lexington once his football career came to an end and returned to his hometown in Owensboro, Kentucky. For almost 15 years, Hogg decided not to return to the University of Kentucky. He then later on re-established his relationship with the university, and became an active member of the University of Kentucky K-Club.

In 2019, the University of Kentucky football team, recognized Hogg as its honorary captain for the 2019 season opener. Those in the stadium and watching the game from home paid tribute to his legacy, and recognized him for his role on the field and lasting impact made on those who knew him.
