= Liang Wudong =

Chinese physician (1959–2020)

- Born: 14 March 1959; China
- Died: 25 January 2020 (aged 60); Wuhan, Hubei, China
- Cause of death: COVID-19
- Occupation: Physician
- Known for: Being the first doctor to die from COVID-19

Liang Wudong (Chinese: 梁武东; pinyin: Liáng Wǔdōng; 14 March 1959 – 25 January 2020) was a physician at Xinhua Hospital in Wuhan, Hubei, notable for being the first doctor to die from COVID-19 due to a nosocomial infection.

== Life ==
Liang was the director of the Department of Otorhinolaryngology of Hubei Province Integrated Traditional Chinese and Western Medicine Hospital (Xinhua Hospital). He had a history of arrhythmia and persistent atrial fibrillation.

On 16 January 2020, Liang felt unwell and had a high fever and chills. He went to Hubei Integrated Traditional Chinese and Western Medicine Hospital for treatment and found that CT scan showed that the lungs were white and there was obvious symptoms of lung infections. After being contracted with COVID-19, he was admitted to an isolation ward for hospital treatment, and transferred to Wuhan Jinyintan Hospital on 18 January to continue treatment.

At 7 a.m. on 25 January, Liang died at the age of 60. (Note: His age of death by East Asian age reckoning is 62.) On 3 February, the pharmaceutical company Shanxi Zhendong donated 100,000 yuan to Liang Wudong's family, in addition to 2,000 monthly yuan to pay for living expenses, as part of their Benevolent Angel Fund (Chinese: 仁爱天使基金) for families of medical personnel affected by the COVID-19 pandemic in China.

== See also ==
- List of deaths due to COVID-19
