= Yang Xin (art historian) =

Chinese art historian (1940–2020)

Yang Xin (Chinese: 杨新; 1940 – 31 January 2020) was a Chinese art historian and curator who served as Vice Director of the Palace Museum in Beijing from 1987 to 2000. He edited the 60-volume The Palace Museum's Essential Collections as well as its 10-volume English edition (Commercial Press, 2015), and co-authored Three Thousand Years of Chinese Painting (Yale University Press, 2002).

== Biography ==
Yang was born in 1940 in Xiangyin County, Hunan, Republic of China. After graduating from the Guangzhou Academy of Fine Arts High School in 1960, he entered the first class of the Art History Department of the Central Academy of Fine Arts, where he studied under the renowned scholars Xu Bangda and Qigong.

He began working at the Palace Museum in Beijing in 1965. After the turmoil of the Cultural Revolution, Yang became a researcher and served as the main assistant and disciple of Xu Bangda in the 1970s and 1980s. In 1984, he spent a year as a Henry Luce Scholar at the University of California, Berkeley in the United States.

Yang served as Vice Director of the Palace Museum from September 1987 to December 2000, and organized many exhibitions and research projects. In 1992, he and Chang Lin-sheng (张临生), the vice director of the National Palace Museum in Taipei, co-authored the book Guobao Huicui (国宝荟萃, "A Collection of National Treasures"), the first co-publication by the two Palace Museums across the Taiwan Strait. In the decade around 2000, he edited the monumental 60-volume series The Palace Museum's Essential Collections (故宫博物院藏文物精品集). He subsequently oversaw the publication of the English edition of the series, which was published in 10 volumes in 2015 by the Commercial Press of Hong Kong.

Yang wrote many other books, including biographies of Xiang Shengmo, Cheng Zhengkui, and the Eight Eccentrics of Yangzhou. He co-authored Three Thousand Years of Chinese Painting (Yale University Press, 2002) with Richard Barnhart, Nie Chongzheng, James Cahill, Lang Shaojun, and Wu Hung.

Yang died on 31 January 2020.
