= Madan Mohan (cricketer) =

Indian cricketer (1945–2020)

K. Madan Mohan
Personal information
- Born: 12 February 1945
- Died: 8 January 2020 (aged 74)
- Source: ESPNcricinfo, 13 June 2020

Koyippillil Madan Mohan (12 February 1945 – 8 January 2020) was an Indian cricketer who played in thirty-two first-class matches for Kerala between 1961 and 1971.
