= Wang Xianliang =

Chinese politician (1957–2020)

- 王献良

Director of the Wuhan Ethnic and Religious Affairs Committee
- In office 29 February 2012 – April 2017

Personal details
- Born: May 1957 Jianli County, Jingzhou, Hubei
- Died: 26 January 2020 (aged 62) Wuhan, Hubei
- Cause of death: COVID-19
- Party: Chinese Communist Party
- Education: Wuhan Teachers College

Chinese name
- Simplified Chinese: 王献良
- Traditional Chinese: 王獻良
Transcriptions
Standard Mandarin
- Hanyu Pinyin: Wáng Xiànliáng

Wang Xianliang (Chinese: 王献良; pinyin: Wáng Xiànliáng; May 1957 – 26 January 2020) was a Chinese politician and government official who served as the head of the bureau level of Wuhan Ethnic and Religious Affairs Committee.

== Biography ==
Wang Xianliang was born in Jianli, Hubei, China. He studied in Hubei Shayang Normal School and Wuhan Teachers College in 1976. After graduation, he worked in Shayang Normal School and Jingzhou District Education Bureau. He was transferred to Hubei Education College in 1988 and served as the deputy director, director, and director of the Dean's Office. In 1999, he served as the deputy director of Wuhan Civil Affairs Bureau.

On 29 February 2012, a meeting of the Standing Committee of the 13th peoples Congress of Wuhan city voted to approve a new round of personnel appointments and removal, in which Wang Xianliang was appointed director of the Wuhan Ethnic and Religious Affairs Committee. The Committee on Ethnic and Religious Affairs has had problems with squandering and wasting public property, and using vehicles of business management units in violation of the eight regulations of the Central Committee. He served in this position for five years, until April 2017. Wang Xianliang began to report in the media as the leader of the bureau level of Wuhan citizens patriarchal clan Committee.

In February 2017, Wang Xianliang was notified by the Wuhan Commission of Discipline Inspection of the unit's violation of the eight central regulations. After April 2017, he no longer served as director, but still retained the leadership status of the Wuhan Municipal Bureau of Ethnic and Religious Affairs.

Wang died at the age of 62 as a result of COVID-19 on 26 January 2020. Chinese news outlet Caixin reported that he was the first government official to die from the disease.
