= Eddie Legard =

English cricketer (1935–2020)

Personal information
- Full name: Edwin Legard
- Born: 23 August 1935; Barnsley, Yorkshire, England
- Died: 29 January 2020 (aged 84)
- Batting: Right-handed
- Role: Wicket-keeper

Domestic team information
- Years: Team
- 1962–1968: Warwickshire

Career statistics
| Competition | First-class |
|---|---|
| Matches | 20 |
| Runs scored | 144 |
| Batting average | 11.07 |
| 100s/50s | 0/0 |
| Top score | 21 |
| Catches/stumpings | 33/9 |
- Source: Cricinfo, 23 August 2023

Edwin "Eddie" Legard (23 August 1935 – 29 January 2020) was an English cricketer who played in 20 first-class cricket matches for Warwickshire between 1962 and 1968. He was born in Barnsley, Yorkshire.

Legard was a lower-order right-handed batsman and a wicketkeeper. He played for Yorkshire's second eleven in both the Minor Counties and Second Eleven Championship competitions between 1954 and 1959, winning the Minor Counties Championship in both 1957 and 1958. However, he was unable to dislodge his contemporary Jimmy Binks from the Yorkshire first team, and Binks's remarkable immunity from injury or rest meant there were no opportunities whatsoever, so from 1960, Legard started qualifying for Warwickshire. From 1961, however, the former Oxford University captain A. C. Smith became Warwickshire's regular wicketkeeper, and Legard's opportunities were again restricted.

Legard finally made his first-class debut in 1962, appearing in four matches that season and in five the following year, mostly when Smith was called up for representative matches. He was awarded his county cap in 1963. Against Oxford University that season, he had seven wicketkeeping victims in the match, with six catches and one stumping, three of the catches coming off the bowling of Smith, who, after Legard left the county, increasingly turned his hand to medium-pace bowling. In the mid-1960s, however, Legard was unable to displace Smith from the regular first team as wicketkeeper, and after the 1964 season his appearances over the remaining four years that he was on the Warwickshire staff were confined to non-Championship matches; of his 20 first-class games in all, only four were in the Championship. He left Warwickshire after the 1968 season and retired the following year.
