= Raghunath Singh Anjana =

Indian politician (c.1945–2020)

Madhya Pradesh Legislative Assembly
- In office 1990–1993
- Preceded by: Bharat Singh
- Succeeded by: Mohan Singh Kalukheda
- Constituency: Jaora

Personal details
- Born: c. 1945
- Died: 7 January 2020 (aged 75)
- Party: Bharatiya Janata Party

Raghunath Singh Anjana (c. 1945 – 7 January 2020) was an Indian politician from Madhya Pradesh belonging to Bharatiya Janata Party. He was a legislator of the Madhya Pradesh Legislative Assembly.

== Biography ==
Anjana was elected as a legislator of the Madhya Pradesh Legislative Assembly from Jaora in 1990. He beat then Home Minister of the Government of Madhya Pradesh Bharat Singh in the election. He also contested from this constituency in 1993 but did not win.

Anjana died on 7 January 2020 at the age of 75.
