= Giovanni Gazzinelli =

Brazilian medical doctor and scientist (1927–2020)

Giovanni Gazzinelli (6 September 1927, in Araçuaí – 14 January 2020) was a Brazilian medical doctor and scientist, with a PhD in biochemistry from the Universidade Federal de Minas Gerais, with a specialization in immunology.

Gazzinelli was Chief Scientific Investigator at Fiocruz. He received the grã-cruz ("Great Cross") of the Ordem Naciona l do Mérito Científico ("National Order of Scientific Merit") of Brazil.
