= R. Kern Eutsler =

American bishop (1919–2020)

Ralph Kern Eutsler (August 2, 1919 – January 2, 2020) was an American bishop of the United Methodist Church, elected in 1984.

== Birth and family ==
Eutsler was born August 2, 1919, in Bridgewater, Virginia. He married Eva Rebecca Vines of Greenville, Virginia October 10, 1945. She was born June 23, 1922, and is a graduate of Mary Baldwin College, Staunton, Virginia. They had two daughters: Rebecca Ann Coulter and Mary Margaret Abramson.

== Education ==
Eutsler earned the B.A. degree in 1940 from Berea College in Berea, Kentucky, just south of Lexington. He then earned the B.D. degree in 1943 from Union Theological Seminary in New York City.

== Ordained ministry ==
He became a member of the Virginia Annual Conference of The Methodist Church. Rev. Eutsler served the following appointments: Greenville-Mint Spring (1943–45), Elkton (1945–49), Luray (1949–53), South Roanoke (1953–60), the Ginter Park Methodist Church in Richmond (1960–65), and the Washington Street Church in Alexandria (1965–66). In 1966 he was appointed the executive director of Virginia Methodist Homes, Inc., serving in this capacity until 1973. Rev. Eutsler then was appointed the superintendent of the Alexandria District of the United Methodist Church (1973–78), then pastor of the Reveille U.M. Church in Richmond (1978–82). His final appointment before his election to the episcopacy was as director of the Virginia Conference Council on Ministries (1982–84).

Rev. Eutsler was elected a delegate to U.M. General and Jurisdictional Conferences, 1964–84. He served on numerous conference agencies, and on the U.M. General Board of Global Ministries (1972–76) and the General Board of Discipleship (1980–88).

== Episcopal ministry ==
The Rev. Ralph Kern Eutsler was elected to the episcopacy by the 1984 Southeastern Jurisdictional Conference of the U.M. Church. He was assigned to the Holston Episcopal Area, where he served until his retirement in 1988. Bishop Eutsler served as the Chairman of the Curriculum Resources Committee of the U.M. General Board of Discipleship (1984–88).

In retirement Bishop Eutsler served for seven years as the Director of Interpretation and Promotion of United Methodist Volunteers in Mission in the Southeastern Jurisdiction. He also served as a fund raising consultant with local churches. He died on January 2, 2020, at the age of 100.

== See also ==
- List of bishops of the United Methodist Church
