= Paul Murphy (Massachusetts politician) =

American politician (1932–2020)

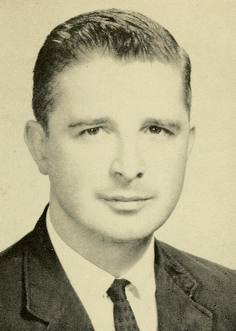
- Murphy in 1967

Member of the Massachusetts House of Representatives from the 11th Plymouth district
- In office 1971–1974 Serving with Robert Creedon (1971–1972) and Paul Studentski (1973–1974)

Member of the Massachusetts House of Representatives from the ? Plymouth district
- In office 1961–1970

Personal details
- Born: Paul Maurice Murphy; February 24, 1932 Brockton, Massachusetts, U.S.
- Died: January 22, 2020 (aged 87)
- Party: Democratic
- Spouse: Marcia McGahan
- Children: 4
- Education: Williams College; Boston University Law School

Paul Maurice Murphy (February 24, 1932 – January 22, 2020) was an American politician and judge from the state of Massachusetts.

== Early life ==
He was born in Brockton, Massachusetts, the son of Judge Maurice J. Murphy and Edith Saxton Murphy. He graduated from Williams College, where he played baseball, and Boston University School of Law. He was a second lieutenant in the U.S. Air Force.

== Political career ==
He served in the Massachusetts House of Representatives from 1961 to 1974, representing the 11th Plymouth district from 1971 to 1974. He lost renomination in 1974.

== Judicial career ==
He was appointed by President George H. W. Bush as an administrative law judge in the Social Security Administration, a position he held for 25 years.

== Personal life and death ==
Murphy married Marcia McGahan with whom he had 4 children, Sarah Murphy Brown, Charles Murphy, Emily Murphy Doyle, and Andrew Murphy.

He died on January 22, 2020.

== Electoral history ==
1974 Massachusetts 12th Plymouth District State Representative Democratic Primary

Mark E. Lawton (D) 64.6%
Paul M. Murphy (D) (inc.) 35.4%

1972 Massachusetts 11th Plymouth District State Representative General Election

Paul M. Murphy (D) (inc.) 36.2%
Paul V. Studentski (D) 34.4%
Paul J. Burns (R) 17.3%
Warren Russell Emerson (R) 12.2%

1972 Massachusetts 11th Plymouth District State Representative Democratic Primary

Paul M. Murphy (D) (inc.) 29.4%
Paul V. Studentski (D) 25.1%
James J. Adams (D) 18.4%
Francis P. Carchidi (D) 11.5%
Howard A. Coleman Jr. (D) 9.2%
T. Robert Saad (D) 6.3%

1970 Massachusetts 11th Plymouth District State Representative General Election

Robert S. Creedon Jr. (D) 51.2%
Paul M. Murphy (D) (inc.) 48.8%
