= January–March 2020 in science =

This article lists a number of significant events in science that have occurred in the first quarter of 2020.

== Events ==
=== January ===
- 1 January
  - Researchers demonstrate an artificial intelligence (AI) system, based on a Google DeepMind algorithm, that is capable of surpassing human experts in breast cancer detection.
  - Astrophysicist Ronald Mallett proposes a theoretical way of building a time machine, albeit with limitations, based on ring lasers and special and general relativity equations.
- 3 January
  - Astronomers report evidence that suggests that the planet Venus is currently volcanically active, and the residue from such activity may be a potential source of nutrients for possible microorganisms in the Venusian atmosphere, according to researchers.
- 3–5 January – Chinese virologist Zhang Yongzhen sequences the Severe acute respiratory syndrome coronavirus 2 genome.
- 6 January
  - The American College of Physicians issues clinical guidelines for exogenous testosterone treatment in adult men with age-related low levels of testosterone. The guidelines are supported by the American Academy of Family Physicians.
  - NASA reports the discovery of TOI 700 d, the first Earth-sized exoplanet in the habitable zone discovered by the Transiting Exoplanet Survey Satellite (TESS). The exoplanet orbits the star TOI 700 101.4 light-years away in the constellation Dorado.
  - Astronomers report that a repeating Fast Radio Burst (FRB) (namely, FRB 180916), the second such FRB precisely located, originated from a medium-sized spiral galaxy 500 million light-years away.
  - The Chinese paddlefish is found to be extinct after extensive surveys failed to find any living specimens, pending official IUCN confirmation.
  - A rare circumbinary planet, called TOI 1338 b, is discovered by Wolf Cukier, a 17-year-old intern at NASA's Goddard Space Flight Center.

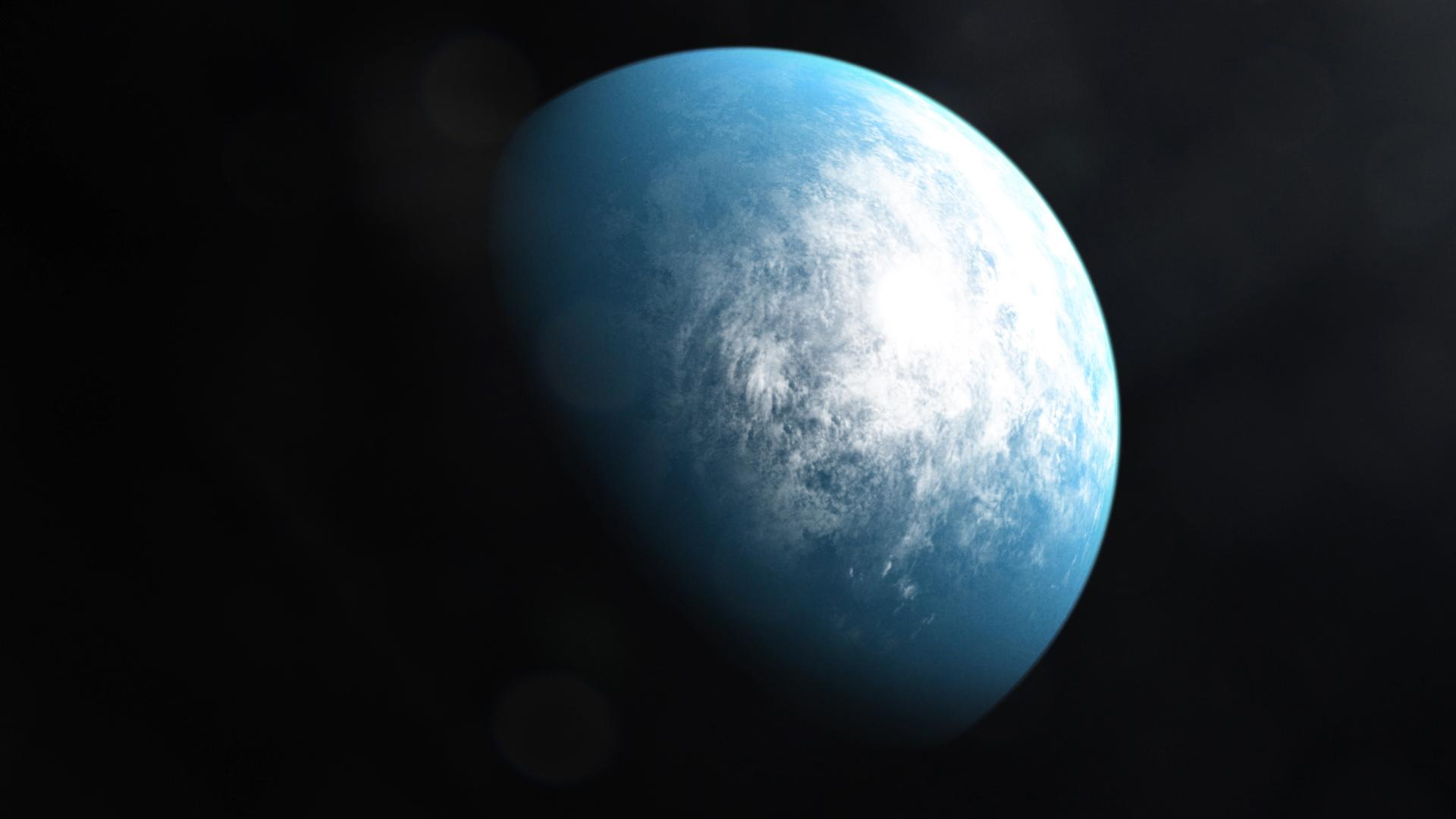
6 January: Astronomers report the detection of TOI 700 d, the first Earth-sized exoplanet in the habitable zone discovered by the Transiting Exoplanet Survey Satellite (TESS). The image shows concept art.

- 7 January
  - Astronomers describe the "Radcliffe Wave", a large ribbon of gas extending 9,000 light years in length and flowing 500 light years above and below the galactic plane, with approximately three million solar masses.
  - The National Science Foundation (NSF) renames the Large Synoptic Survey Telescope (LSST) to the Vera C. Rubin Observatory (VRO) in honor of astronomer Vera Rubin who is notable for her pioneering work with galaxy rotation rates which provided evidence for the existence of dark matter.
- 8 January
  - The American Cancer Society reports a 2.2% drop in the cancer death rate between 2016 and 2017, the largest single-year decline in mortality for this disease ever recorded in the United States.
  - Scientists publish evidence from Siberian caves suggesting that summer sea ice in the Arctic Ocean plays an essential role in stabilising permafrost and its large store of carbon.
- 10 January – Scientists report the discovery of the oldest known occurrence of an animal digestive tract, found in fossils, unearthed near Pahrump, Nevada, of Cloudinidae, an extinct wormlike organism that lived during the late Ediacaran period about 550 million years ago.
- 11 January – After a three-year trial that included testing, commissioning, calibrations and operations authorities declare that China's FAST telescope – the world's largest filled-aperture radio telescope – is starting formal operations after it passed its national acceptance test.

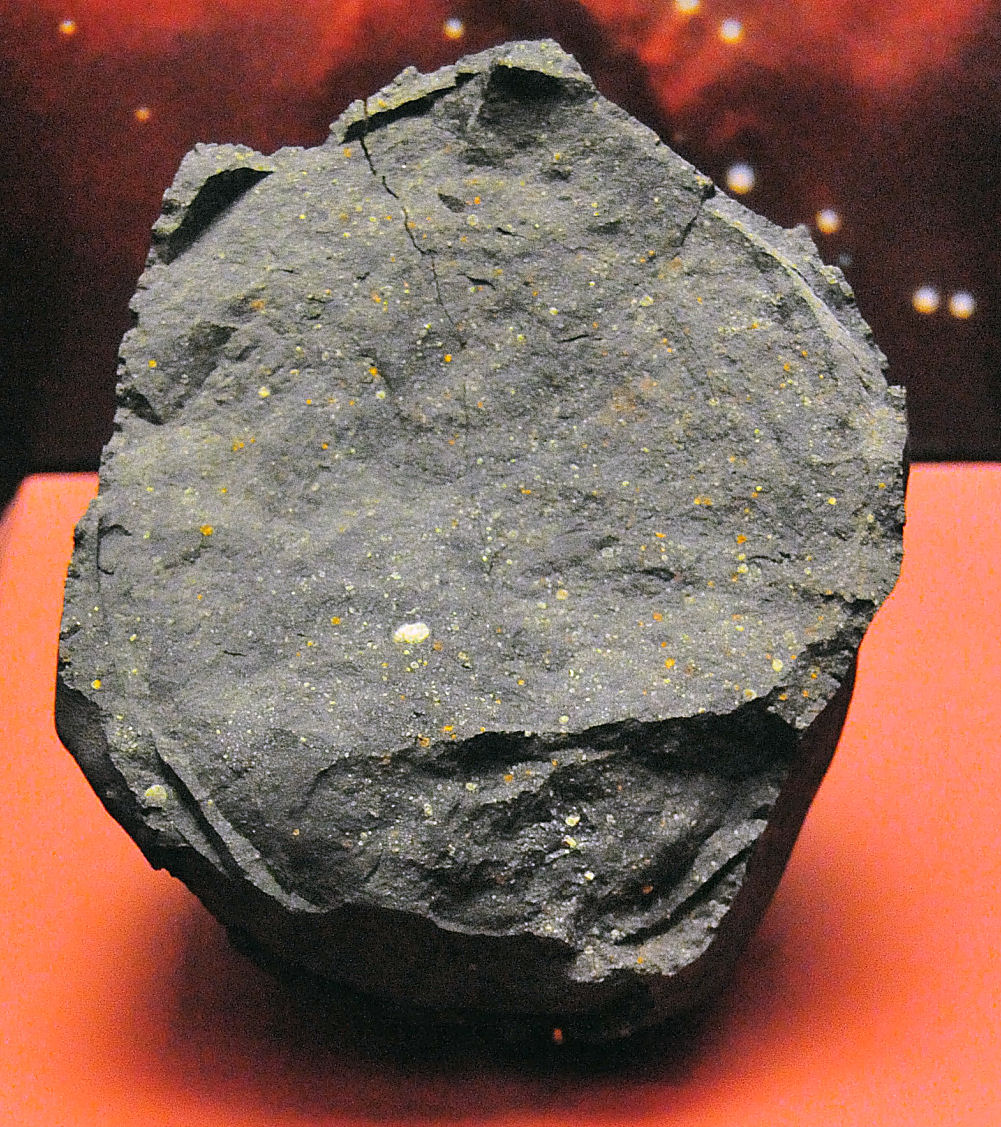
13 January: scientists report that the oldest material on Earth found so far are Murchison meteorite particles that have been determined to be 7 billion years old, billions of years older than the 4.54 billion years age of the Earth.

- 13 January
  - A study finds that ocean temperatures were at a record high in 2019 and underwent the largest single-year increase of the decade.
  - Astronomers report that the oldest material on Earth found so far are Murchison meteorite particles that have been determined to be 7 billion years old, billions of years older than the 4.54 billion years age of the Earth itself.
- 15 January
  - Astronomers report, for the first time, the origin of phosphorus, an essential element of life as we know it. Phosphorus was found to be initially formed in star-forming regions, and carried by comets, in the form of phosphorus monoxide, throughout outer space, including the early Earth.
  - Scientists report that "Candidatus Prometheoarchaeum syntrophicum", a type of Promethearchaeati archaea microorganism, may be a possible link between simple prokaryotic and complex eukaryotic microorganisms about two billion years ago.
  - Paleontologists report the discovery of Wulong bohaiensis, Chinese for "dancing dragon," a very small feathered dinosaur that lived 120 million years ago, and that may help better explain the link between non-avian dinosaurs and avian dinosaurs (birds).

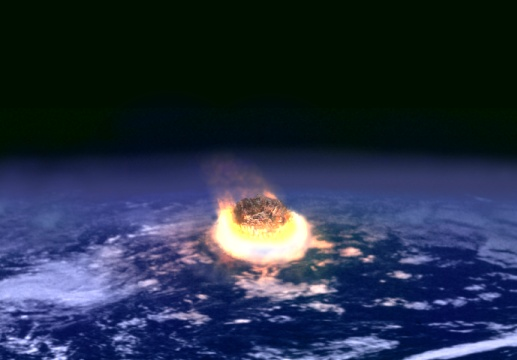
16 January: Scientists report that the extinction of the non-avian dinosaurs about 66 million years ago was mostly a result of a meteorite impact, the Chicxulub impactor, and not volcanism.

- 16 January
  - Scientists report that the extinction of the non-avian dinosaurs about 66 million years ago was mostly a result of a meteorite impact (the Chicxulub impactor) and not a result of volcanism. In a study published on 29 June other researchers also conclude that the asteroid impact was the main driver of this extinction.
  - The giant squid genome is sequenced for the first time.
  - Quantum physicists report the first direct splitting of one photon into three using spontaneous parametric down-conversion and which may have applications in quantum technology.

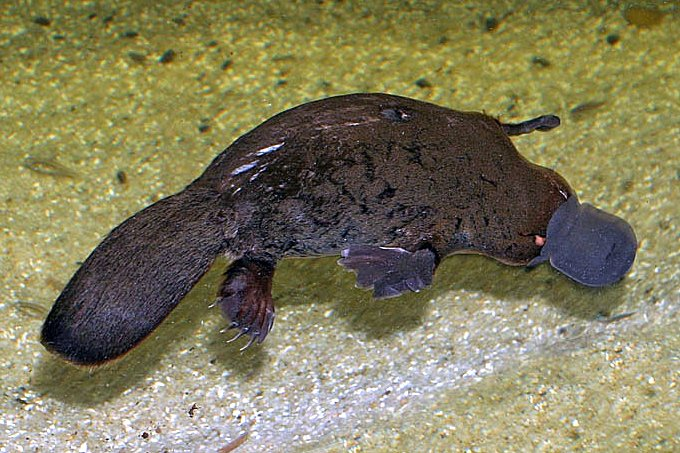
21 January: Researchers present evidence that the platypus is at risk of extinction.

- 17 January – For the first time, scientists report a video of atoms bonding and separating.
- 20 January
  - Astronomers, using X-ray reverberation echo mapping techniques, report the mass and spin, for the first time, of a supermassive black hole, particularly the black hole in the middle of the IRAS 13224-3809 galaxy located about 1 billion light-years from Earth.
  - COVID-19 pandemic: Chinese authorities first publicly confirm that there is human-to-human transmission of severe acute respiratory syndrome coronavirus 2.
- 21 January
  - Scientists report that the oldest recognised asteroid impact occurred in Western Australia more than 2.2 billion years ago and that it might have ended the ice age at that time.
  - A study finds record high emissions of the potent greenhouse gas, HFC-23.
  - Researchers present evidence that the platypus is at risk of extinction, due to a combination of water resource development, land clearing, climate change and increasingly severe periods of drought.
  - Researchers develop a single molecule that can absorb sunlight from the entire visible spectrum for the production of the fuel hydrogen, harnessing more than 50% more solar energy than current solar cells can.
  - A study by researchers finds that man-made ozone-depleting substances (ODS) caused the largest share of Arctic warming, one-third of global warming and roughly half of Arctic warming and sea ice loss from 1955 to 2005.

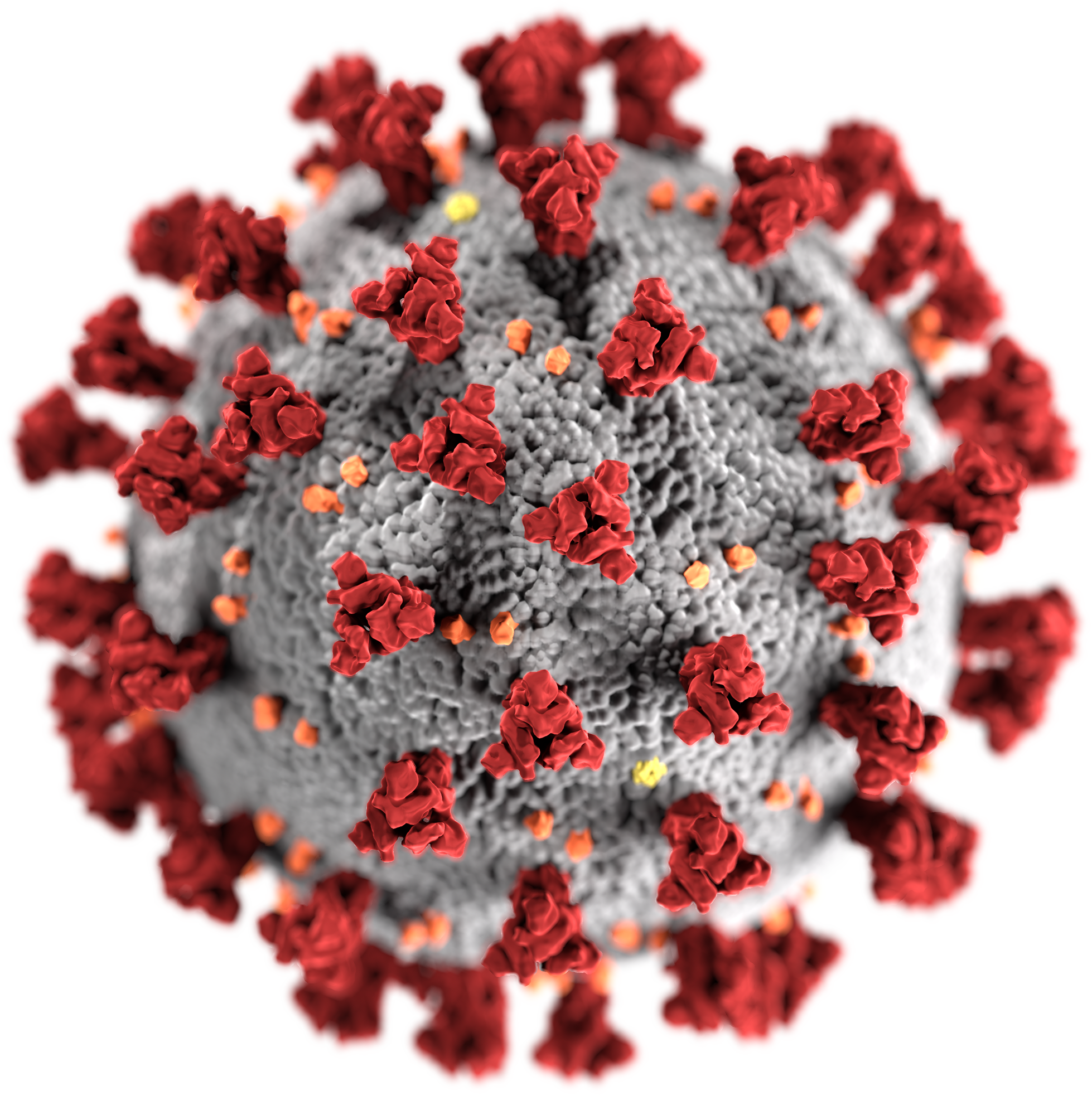
31 January: Scientists and journalists report overviews of the novel coronavirus SARS-CoV-2.

- 22 January – China releases a large amount of data and high-resolution images from the lander and rover of the Chang'e 4 mission which has been studying the far side of the Moon since 3 January 2019.
- 23 January
  - Researchers announce the first replication of a vocal tract and voice simulation of an Egyptian mummy (the priest Nesyamun).
  - Marine biologists announce new findings that provide evidence that genus Hemiscyllium – also known as "walking sharks" as they can walk on land – was the newest genus of sharks in terms of historical findings on biological evolution.
- 24 January – For the first time, scientists discover mitochondria existing in human blood that are not part of larger cells.
- 27 January
  - A new species of dinosaur is discovered, Allosaurus jimmadseni, from genus Allosaurus.
  - Scientists demonstrate a "Trojan horse" designer-nanoparticle that makes blood cells eat away – from the inside out – portions of atherosclerotic plaque that cause heart attacks and are the current most common cause of death globally.
- 28 January – A new study finds that many of Earth's biodiverse ecosystems are in danger of collapse. The study mapped over 100 high-risk ecosystems and habitats in specific locations, and notes the highly detrimental patterns in each one that result from climate change and local human activities.
- 31 January – Scientists and journalists report overviews of the novel coronavirus SARS-CoV-2 outbreak, later classified as a pandemic, including on the infectability, mortality rate, incubation time, worldwide ability to contain the outbreak, and estimated time for a vaccine (along with a comparison with other similar outbreaks).

=== February ===
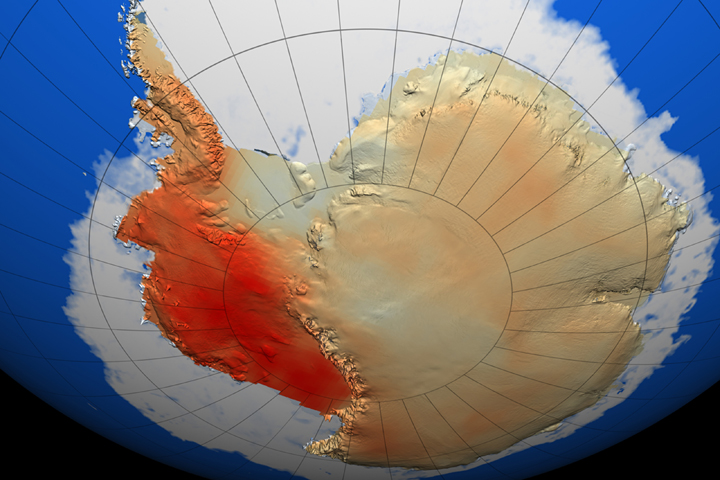
6 February: Meteorologists report a record high temperature of 18.3 °C (64.9 °F) on the northern tip of Antarctica. The image shows the warming trend 1957 to 2006.

- 3 February – Astronomers report in a preprint, later published in a journal in June, that, for the first time, repeating pulses from a source of fast radio bursts seem to have a regular periodicity, particularly FRB 180916, about 500 million light years from Earth, which have been found to have a 16.35+0.18
  −0.18-day pulse cycle.
- 4 February – The drugs remdesivir and chloroquine are shown to effectively inhibit SARS-CoV-2 in vitro.
- 5 February
  - Scientists of the International Muon Ionization Cooling Experiment announce that they have found a way to squeeze the muons of a muon beam into a smaller volume. The muons are cooled into a denser cloud by being directed through specially designed energy-absorbing materials while the beam is tightly focused by powerful superconducting magnetic lenses and can then be accelerated by a normal particle accelerator in a precise direction. This technique may allow the construction of a muon collider. Cooling the muons beams is crucial to achieve a high collision rate.
  - In a study researchers assess that Extant-Native Trophic (ENT), a trophic rewilding approach which restores lost species to ecosystems, can help mitigate climate change. This form of rewilding would restore large-bodied herbivore and carnivore guilds which could reduce methane emissions and according to the study could be an "important complementary strategy to natural climate solutions to ensure other nature-based benefits to biodiversity conservation and society are also delivered".
  - Scientists develop a CRISPR-Cas12a-based gene editing system that can probe and control several genes at once and can implement logic gating to e.g. detect cancer cells and execute therapeutic immunomodulatory responses.
  - Scientists report that 70 million years ago Earth rotated 372 times a year, with a day lasting a half an hour less than today after studying the growth rings of fossilized mollusk shells from the late Cretaceous. The slowdown is due to the tidal effects the Moon has on Earth's rotation.
- 6 February
  - A record-breaking 18.3 °C (64.9 °F) temperature is recorded at an Argentine weather base on the northern tip of Antarctica, according to the World Meteorological Organization (WMO). The previous record was 17.5 °C (63.5 °F) in March 2015. On 9 February another Antarctic weather research station, located on Seymour Island registered a temperature of 20.75 Celsius, considered to be a "likely record" and requiring some open questions to be answered before being confirmed.
  - Scientists report that preliminary results from a phase I trial using CRISPR-Cas9 gene editing of T cells in patients with refractory cancer demonstrates that such CRISPR-based therapies can be safe and feasible.

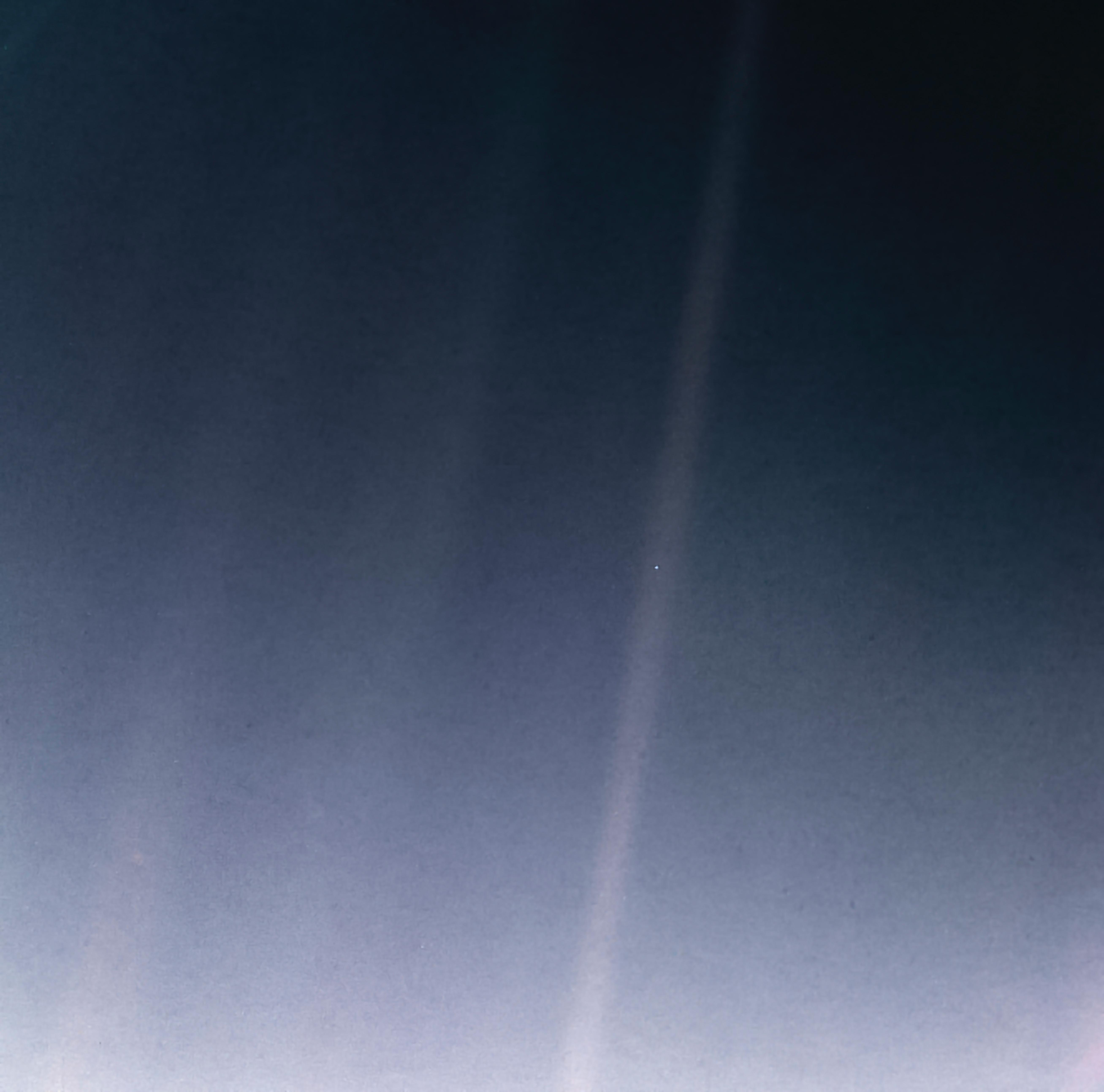
12 February: NASA releases an improved version of the Pale Blue Dot image taken of Earth 6 billion km away by the Voyager 1 space probe on 14 February 1990.

- 10 February
  - NASA announces preliminary approval of a sample-return mission to the planet Mars.
  - Scientists of NASA's Arctic Boreal Vulnerability Experiment (ABoVE) publish conclusions from mapped methane hotspots of an Arctic 30,000‐km^{2} study domain. They used the AVIRIS—NG instrument on flights over the Arctic to map the hotspots and quantified a power law dependence of the emissions on distance to nearest standing water.
  - Scientists report that bats' heightened immune responses to their viruses, of which SARS-CoV-2 is a likely example, can facilitate the evolution of rapidly-replicating viruses that likely cause enhanced virulence following emergence into secondary hosts with other immune systems such as humans. The researchers used a combination of in vitro experimentation and within-host modeling to explore the impact of the previously already well-known unique bat immunity on virus dynamics.
- 11 February
  - Quantum engineers report that they have created artificial atoms in silicon quantum dots for quantum computing and that artificial atoms with a higher number of electrons can be more stable qubits than previously thought possible. Enabling silicon-based quantum computers may make it possible to reuse of manufacturing technology of "classical" modern-day computer chips among other advantages.
  - Researchers report that their projections show that the number of compound hot extremes that combine daytime and nighttime heat could quadruple by 2100 in the Northern Hemisphere even if emissions are brought down to meet the Paris climate deal goals.

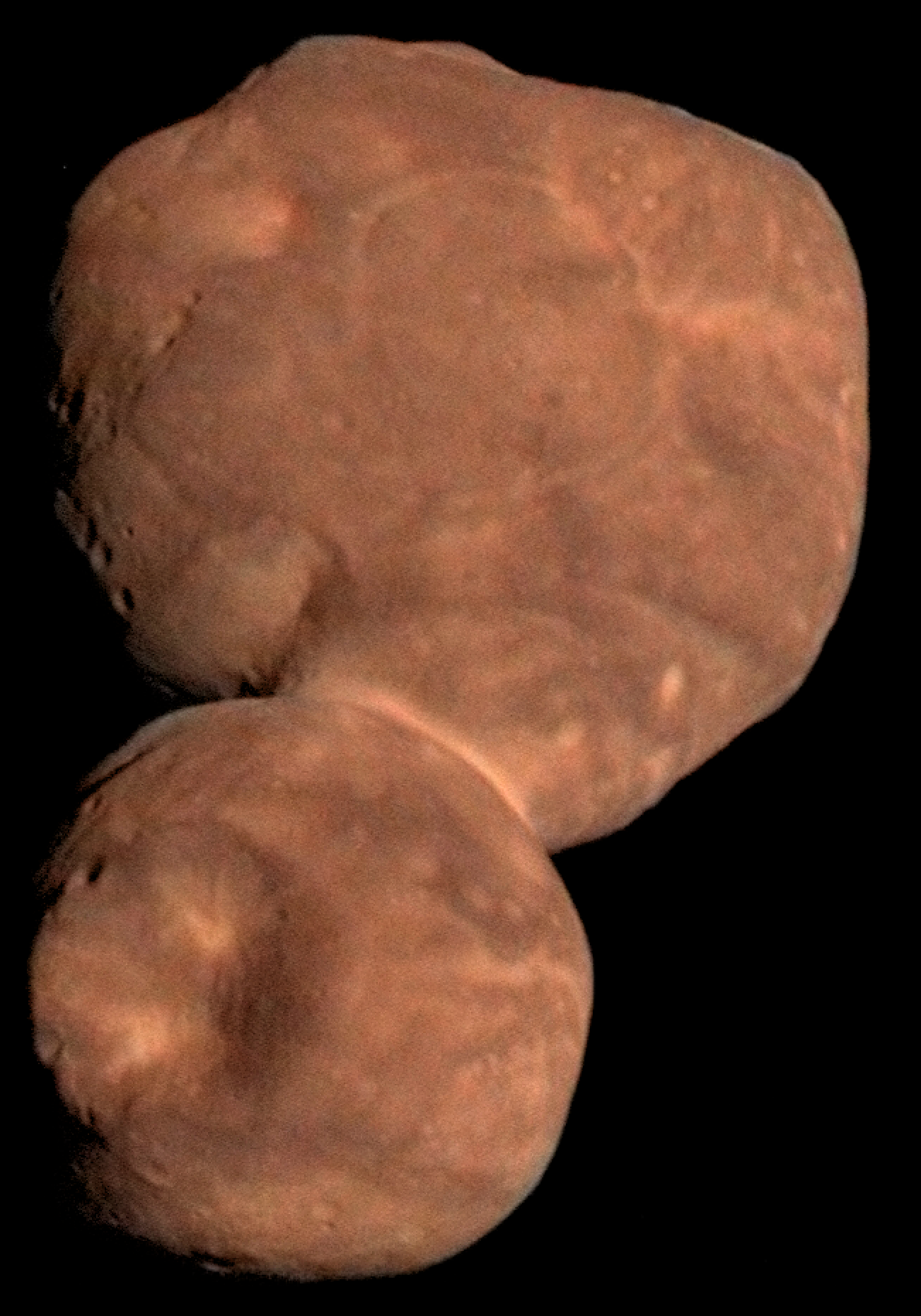
13 February: NASA reports more support for finding complex organic compounds on 486958 Arrokoth, a Kuiper Belt object visited by the New Horizons space probe on 1 January 2019.

- 12 February
  - NASA releases a greatly improved image of the iconic Pale Blue Dot view of Earth from 6 billion kilometres (3.7 billion miles) away that was taken by the Voyager 1 space probe on 14 February 1990.
  - A research team shows that by combining two nanomaterials they can create a nanoscale device that mimics the neural pathways of brain cells used for human vision and can be used to detect faces.
  - Researchers publish their discovery of a new class of glycopeptide antibiotics with a novel mode of action – the known antibiotic complestatin and the newly discovered corbomycin. These have low levels of resistance development, can be capable of treating drug-resistant infections and were discovered using a methodology that analyses the phylogeny of genes and lack of known resistance determinants.
  - Scientists publish a study which shows that present-day west Africans trace a substantial proportions of up to almost a fifth of their genetic ancestry to an extinct archaic human species – a ghost population. They estimate that the species split from the ancestors of Neanderthals and modern humans between 360,000 and 1 million years ago and that interbreeding occurred at some point in the past 124,000 years and approximately 43,000 years ago.
- 13 February – NASA publishes studies that investigate 486958 Arrokoth's shape and its formation and evolution as well as its age, composition, geology and geophysics. Arrokoth is a trans-Neptunian object in the Kuiper Belt that the New Horizons space probe visited during a flyby on 1 January 2019. They find that its shape was caused by a gentle, low-speed merger in the early Solar System. They also provide further support for the presence of a mixture of organic compounds called tholins and find that it appears to be a classical Kuiper belt object comparable to others and that it hence can likely be used to understand the cold classical belt as a whole.
- 14 February
  - Astronomers report that the brightness of the star Betelgeuse had not only dropped by a factor of approximately 2.5, from magnitude 0.5 to 1.5, but now the star may no longer be round. Nonetheless, astronomers believe a supernova event may not be imminent.
  - Quantum physicists develop a novel single-photon source which may allow to bridge semiconductor-based quantum-computers that use photons by converting the state of an electron spin to the polarisation of a photon. They show that they can generate a single photon in a controlled way without the need for randomly formed quantum dots or structural defects in a diamonds.
  - A research team announces the discovery of a new electronic state of matter. They show that when electrons can be made to attract one another, they can form sets of two to five electrons that behave like new types of particles.
  - The Breakthrough Listen project for the search for extraterrestrial intelligence (SETI) announces the release of nearly 2 petabytes of data after a petabyte of radio and optical telescope data was released in June 2019. It comes from a survey of the radio spectrum between 1 and 12 gigahertz (GHz) and is the largest release of SETI data in the history of the field.
  - Scientists report the development of a relatively long-lasting and economical catalyst "Nanocatalysts on Single Crystal Edges" that recycles the greenhouse gases carbon dioxide and methane into hydrogen and carbon monoxide that can e.g. be used in fuels.

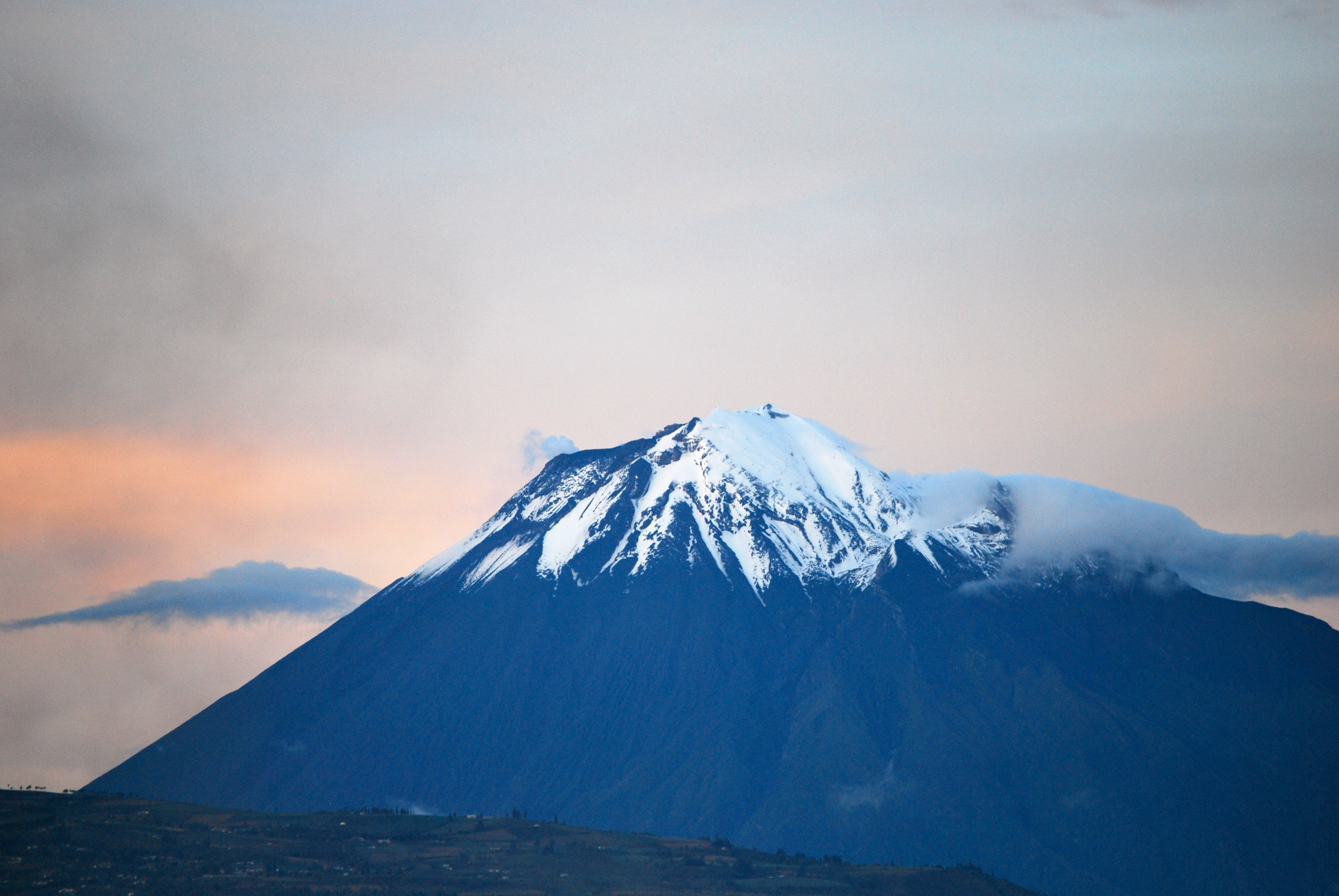
18 February: Scientists report an unstable western flank of the Tungurahua volcano in Ecuador that may result in a large landslide.

- 17 February – Astronomers report, for the first time, the detection of radio waves related to an exoplanet: in this instance, the radio waves may have resulted from the interaction between the red dwarf star, GJ 1151 and a "short-period terrestrial-mass planet".
- 18 February – Scientists report warning signs of flank instability of the Ecuadorian Tungurahua volcano. A potential collapse of the western flank could result in a large landslide.
- 19 February
  - Scientists present an atomic-level image using cryogenic electron microscopy of an essential protein used to access cells by the SARS-CoV-2 novel coronavirus that is responsible for the coronavirus disease 2019 (COVID-19) and COVID-19 pandemic. This image may help in more quickly finding a cure or to develop medical countermeasures (MCMs) for the viral infection.
  - Researchers report evidence consistent with an early domestication of dogs before 28,500 years ago, dating the earliest known example of a human domestication to sometime in the Middle or Upper Paleolithic during the Last Glacial Period. The teeth of a fossilized jaw that age found near ancient human settlements suggest a less wolf-like diet after microwear analysis, suggesting that these were "protodogs".
- 20 February – Scientists use the world's most powerful supercomputer, SUMMIT, to screen molecules which bind to either SARS-CoV-2's spike protein or to its human ACE2 interface and publish their results, including a ranked list of compounds which may be repurposed to attenuate COVID-19, in a preprint.
- 22 February
  - Astronomers report that the star Betelgeuse, that has been undergoing a substantial decrease in brightness since October 2019, may have stopped dimming, and may now be beginning to again brighten, all but ending the current dimming episode. Further studies of the star, reported on 24 February 2020, found no significant change in the infrared over the last 50 years, and seems unrelated to the recent visual fading, suggesting, despite speculations, that an impending core collapse, resulting in a supernova explosion, may be unlikely. Even further related studies, also reported on 24 February 2020, suggest that occluding "large-grain circumstellar dust" may be the most likely explanation for the dimming of the star.
  - Scientists from Harvard University, along with physics and biotech companies PLEX Corporation and Bruker Scientific, publish details of hemolithin they claim to have found in meteorite Acfer 086 – the first protein found in a meteorite if peer-review confirms their findings. Their findings may be relevant to theories of panspermia and pseudo-panspermia according to which life exists throughout the Universe and is distributed directly or indirectly via objects such as meteoroids. However, some scientists have expressed skepticism about the results of the study.

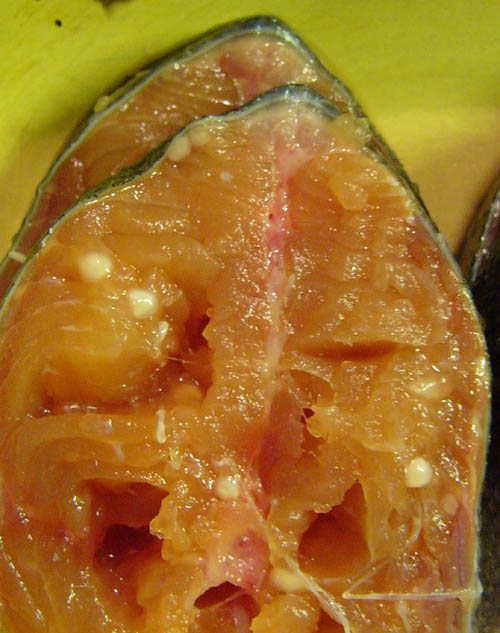
25 February: Discovery reported of the first animal, a parasite of salmon named Henneguya salminicola, that lost its mitochondria and does not use oxygen to produce energy.

- 24 February
  - A study of the 2019–20 Australian bushfire season, published in Nature, finds that 21% of Australia's forests (excluding Tasmania) have burnt down, an amount described in the journal as "unprecedented" and "greatly exceed[ing] previous fires both within Australia and globally" in terms of scale within the last 20 years. Other characteristics that distinguish the fires from similar ones include that they happened in populated areas instead of remote areas in e.g. Siberia – due to which a large number of people were affected by smoke of the fires – and their intensity and geographical spread across the country.
  - Paleontologists report the discovery of 1 billion-year-old micro-fossils of 2 mm sized green seaweeds called Proterocladus antiquus. The algae could produce oxygen via photosynthesis and is a close relative of the ancestor of all contemporary green plants including land plants which evolved ca. 450 million years ago. Previously the oldest green seaweeds were dated to roughly 800 million years ago.
  - Scientists report that thiophene organic molecules detected by the Curiosity rover on the planet Mars between 2012 and 2017 are consistent with earlier life on Mars and summarize conceivable pathways for its generation and degradation on the planet. It's not currently known if the detected thiophenes – usually associated on Earth with kerogen, coal and crude oil — are the result of biological or non-biological processes. They show that they could have either a biological or abiotic origin.
  - Initial phase 1 testing of a Coronavirus vaccine from biotechnology company Moderna is reported to start soon.

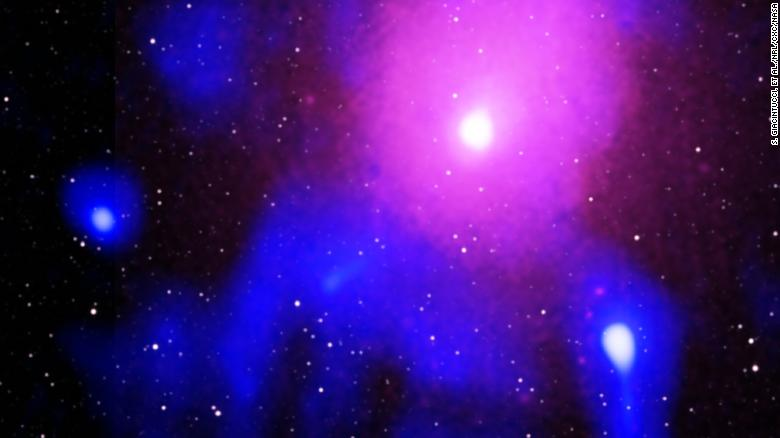
27 February: Astronomers report the discovery of the largest known explosion in the Universe – a cavity in the Ophiuchus Supercluster (pictured).

- 25 February
  - Scientists at Tel Aviv University report the first discovery of an animal that has lost its mitochondria. Therefore, it is not using oxygen for generating its chemical energy. Henneguya zschokkei, a <10-celled parasite that lives in salmon muscle, has lost its ability for oxygen-respiration and thereby also shows that evolution can lead to abandonment of useful functions and less complex organisms.
  - Scientists visualize a quantum measurement: by taking snapshots of ion states at different times of measurement via coupling of a trapped ion qutrit to the photon environment they show that the changes of the degrees of superpositions and therefore of probabilities of states after measurement happens gradually under the measurement influence.
  - KAGRA joins LIGO and Virgo in the search for more gravitational wave events.
- 26 February – Chinese astronomers report, for the first time, a high-resolution image of a lunar ejecta sequence, and, as well, direct analysis of its internal architecture. These were based on observations made by the Lunar Penetrating Radar (LPR) on board the Yutu-2 rover, part of the Chang'e 4 mission, while studying the far side of the Moon.
- 27 February – Astronomers report the discovery of a large cavity in the Ophiuchus Supercluster, first detected in 2016 and originating from a supermassive black hole with the mass of 10 million solar masses. The cavity is a result of the largest known explosion in the Universe. The formerly active galactic nucleus created it by emitting radiation and particle jets, possibly as a result of a spike in supply of gas to the black hole that could have occurred if a galaxy fell into the centre of the cavity.

=== March ===
- 2 March – Scientists report to have achieved repeated quantum nondemolition measurements of an electron's spin in a silicon quantum dot: measurements that do not change the electron's spin in the process.
- 3 March – Researchers report that stable d*(2830) hexaquark Bose–Einstein condensates could have formed in the early universe with a production rate sufficiently large to account for the 85% of matter thought to be dark matter, and therefore could be a plausible new candidate for dark matter. They were previously shown to possibly behave like dark matter.

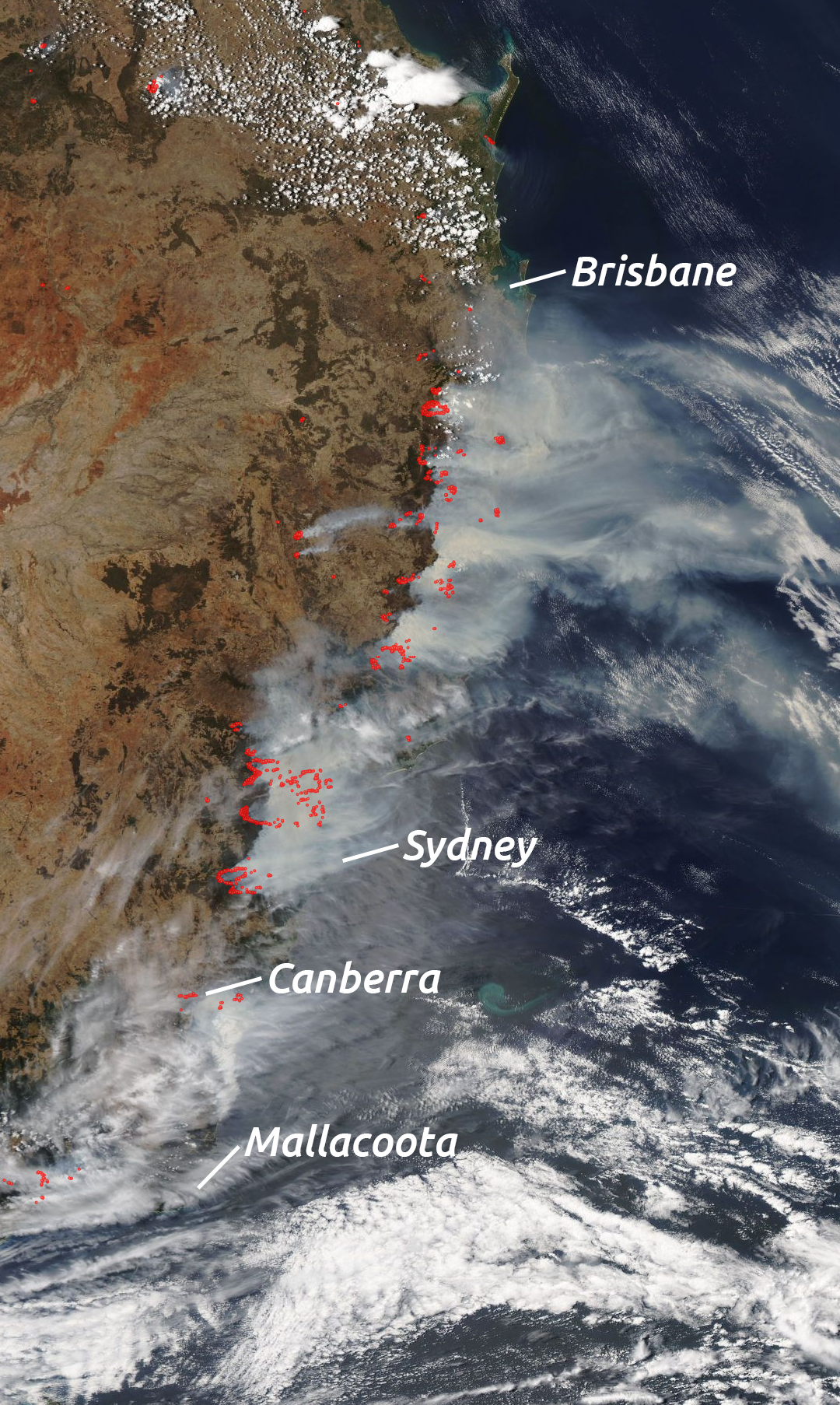
4 March: Scientists of the international World Weather Attribution project publicize a study which found that human-caused climate change had an influence on the 2019–20 Australian wildfires.

- 4 March
  - A global scientific collaboration of ca. 100 institutions publishes their analysis of three decades of tree growth and death in 565 undisturbed tropical forests across Africa and the Amazon. The researchers found that the overall uptake of carbon into Earth's intact tropical forests peaked in the 1990s, dropped by one-third on average by the 2010s and may have started a downward trend. While extra carbon dioxide boosts tree growth, the effect is countered by negative impacts of higher temperatures and droughts which slow growth and can kill trees. Their models project a long-term decline in the African carbon sink and the Amazonas likely becoming a carbon source, rather than sink, in the mid-2030s.
  - Scientists report the discovery of a second mechanism that repairs interstrand crosslink (ICL) DNA damage caused by the alcohol metabolite acetaldehyde next to the Fanconi anemia pathway, which cuts DNA to remove the ICL: enzymes cutting the crosslink itself.
  - Researchers report that their review indicates that the unguarded X hypothesis may be valid: according to this hypothesis one reason for why the average lifespan of males is not as long as that of females – by 18% on average according to the study – is that they have a Y chromosome which cannot protect an individual from harmful genes expressed on the X chromosome, while a duplicate X chromosome, as present in female organisms, can ensure harmful genes are not expressed.
  - Scientists report that they have developed a way to 3D bioprint graphene oxide with a protein. They demonstrate that this novel bioink can be used to recreate vascular-like structures. This may be used in the development of safer and more efficient drugs.
  - Scientists of the international World Weather Attribution project publicize a study which found that human-caused climate change had an influence on the 2019–20 Australian wildfires by causing high-risk conditions that made widespread burning at least 30 percent more likely. They comment on the results, stating that climate change probably had more effects on the fires which couldn't be attributed using their climate simulations and that not all drivers of the fires showed imprints of anthropogenic climate change.
  - Scientists report to have used CRISPR-Cas9 gene editing inside a human's body for the first time. They aim to restore vision for a patient with inherited Leber congenital amaurosis and state that it may take up to a month to see whether the procedure was successful. In an hour-long surgery study approved by government regulators doctors inject three drops of fluid containing viruses under the patient's retina. In earlier tests in human tissue, mice and monkeys scientists were able to correct half of the cells with the disease-causing mutation, which was more than what is needed to restore vision. Unlike germline editing these DNA modifications aren't inheritable.
5 March

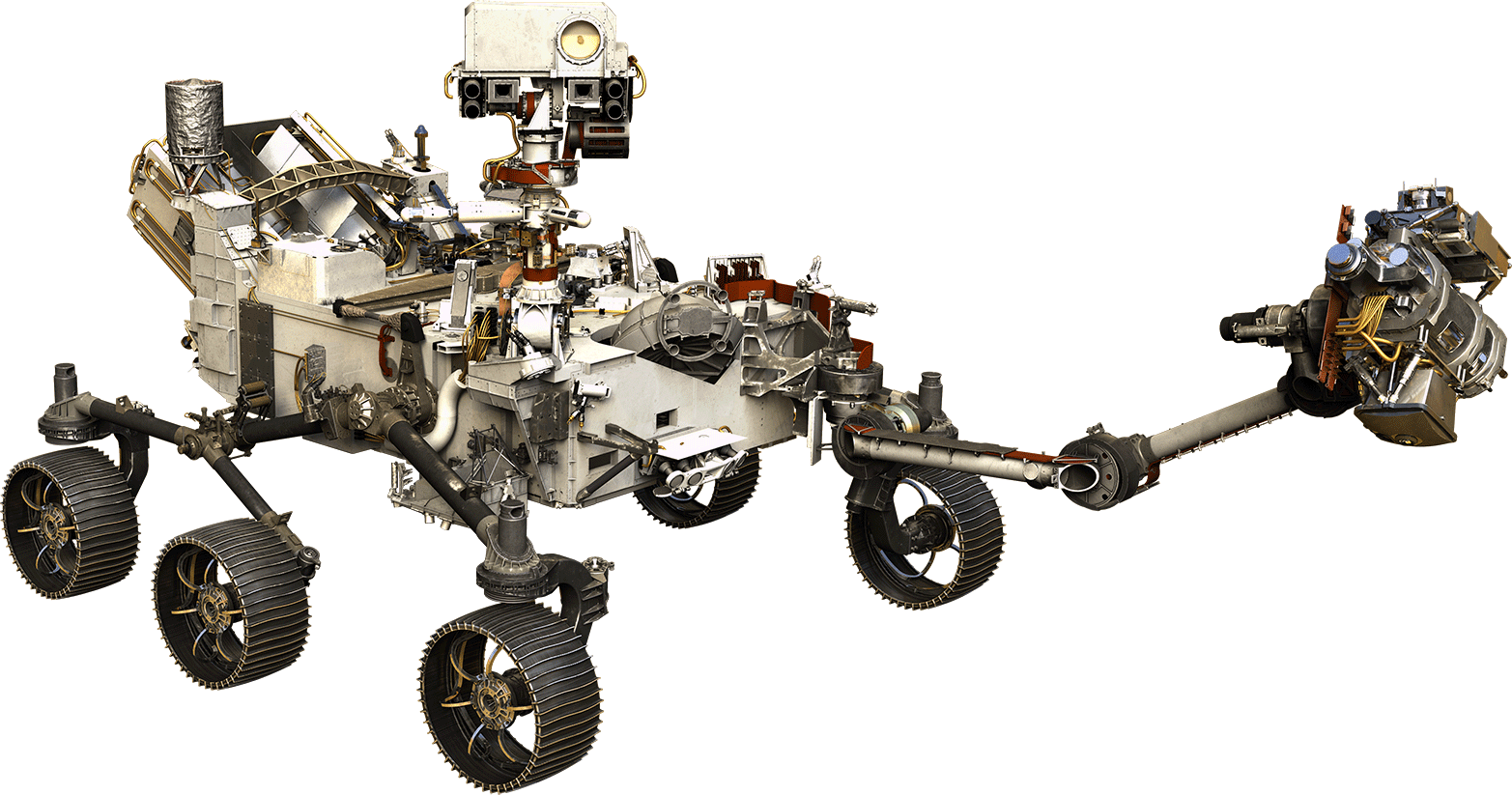
NASA names the Mars 2020 rover Perseverance.

A video explaining the study "Harm to Others Acts as a Negative Reinforcer in Rats"

- 5 March
  - NASA officially names the originally titled Mars 2020 rover to the newly titled Perseverance rover, after conducting a student naming contest in the Fall of 2019.
  - Computer security experts report another Intel chip security flaw, besides the Meltdown and Spectre flaws, with the systematic name CVE-2019-0090 (or, "Intel CSME Bug"). This newly found flaw is not fixable with a firmware update, and affects nearly "all Intel chips released in the past five years".
  - Scientists report that they have identified a second enzyme in the cell membrane of lung cells essential for entry of SARS-CoV-2 into the cells after the enzyme ACE2 has been identified earlier by other researchers. They found that the protease TMPRSS2 is split by the virus' spike protein to enter the cell and that the TMPRSS2-inhibitors Camostat and, in a second report by other researchers on 18 March, Nafamostat may be potential treatments as they reduced the probability of the virus entering cells in vitro.
  - Researchers suggest that more active rest postures may help protect people from the harmful effects of inactivity after reviewing related work, studying a hunter-gatherer population and measuring muscle activity of different resting postures such as sitting. According to their "inactivity mismatch hypothesis" human physiology likely adapted to more consistently active muscles. This may be relevant to new interventions that could reduce widespread negative health impacts of inactivity in industrialized populations.
  - Neuroscientists report that rats show harm aversion with the brain region anterior cingulate cortex (ACC), which is also associated with harm aversion in humans, being activated. Rats stopped choosing candy they preferred over other candy when it meant hurting an unfamiliar, neighbour rat. Reducing brain activity in the ACC by injecting a local anesthetic reversed this behaviour. Moreover, they showed that their harm aversion can be limited as most rats, which previously switched to the less-preferred candy to avoid harm to their neighbours, stopped doing so when offered a choice between one and three candies. Their experiments may show that the moral motivation that keeps humans from harming other humans has old evolutionary origins and is shared to some degree with other animals. They also suggest some level of personality in rats as they showed a wide range of variable responses in the experiment – including indifference and not choosing any of the two levers after the first electric shock was registered. Furthermore, prior experience with footshocks was shown to increase the rats' harm aversion. Rats were shown to be capable of showing empathy as early as 2011.
- 6 March – Scientists show that adding a layer of perovskite crystals on top of textured or planar silicon to create a tandem solar cell enhances its performance up to a power conversion efficiency of 26%. This could be a low cost way to increase efficiency of solar cells.
- 9 March – Scientists show that CRISPR-Cas12b is a third promising CRISPR editing tool, next to Cas9 and Cas12a, for plant genome engineering.

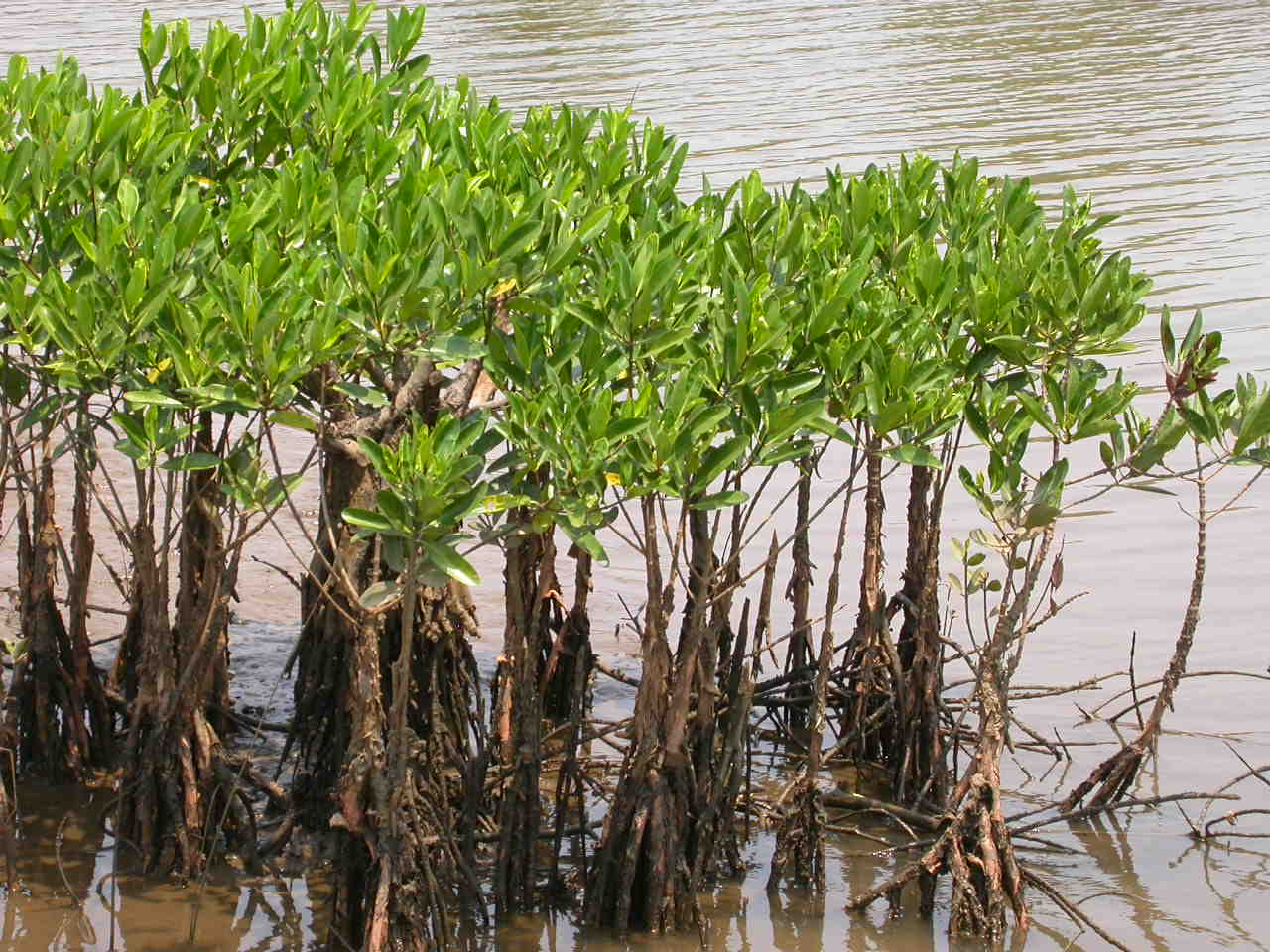
10 March: Researchers show that mangrove forests reduce the risks of flooding at coastlines worldwide.

- 10 March
  - Physicist Lucas Lombriser of the University of Geneva presents a possible way of reconciling the two significantly different determinations of the Hubble constant by proposing the notion of a surrounding vast "bubble", 250 million light years in diameter, that is half the density of the rest of the universe.
  - Scientists publish evidence that even large ecosystems can collapse on relatively short timescales. Their paper suggests that once a 'point of no return' is reached, the Amazon rainforest could shift to a savannah-type mixture of trees and grass within 50 years.
  - Researchers show when, where, and how mangrove forests reduce risks of flooding at coastlines worldwide, evaluate the economic value thereof and illustrate ways to fund mangrove protection with economic incentives, insurance, and climate risk financing.
- 11 March
  - Researchers using ESO's Very Large Telescope (VLT) report the discovery of titanium and vanadium oxides in the atmosphere of WASP-76b, an exoplanet with temperatures of 2,400 °C (4,352 °F) that rains molten iron.
  - Quantum engineers report to have managed to control the nucleus of a single atom using only electric fields. This was first suggested to be possible in 1961 and may be used for silicon quantum computers that use single-atom spins without needing oscillating magnetic fields which may be especially useful for nanodevices, for precise sensors of electric and magnetic fields as well as for fundamental inquiries into quantum nature.
  - Scientists incorrectly report the discovery of dinosaur Oculudentavis khaungraae whose 1.4 centimeter head is well-preserved in amber. The bird-like lizard lived 99 million years ago, was about the size of a bee hummingbird, may provide new implications relevant to bird evolution and, according to paleontologists, is considered to have strange features. At first it was thought that the specimen could represent the smallest dinosaur of the fossil record. The paper was retracted after reviewers agreed with assessments – of which one was uploaded to a preprint server on 18 March – claiming a misclassification of the fossil, believed to be a lizard instead of a dinosaur.
- 12 March – Astronomers report observational evidence of "ongoing nucleus fragmentation" from the interstellar comet 2I/Borisov.
- 13 March – The US Food and Drug Administration (FDA) grants emergency authorisation for a coronavirus test by Swiss diagnostics maker Roche. The automated cobas 8800 system provides a ten-fold improvement in the speed of patient testing, with capacity for up to 4,128 results in 24 hours.
- 14 March
  - Chinese news announces that the first confirmed case of the COVID-19 disease, caused by the SARS-CoV-2 virus, was traced back to a 55-year-old patient in Hubei province, and was reported in a Chinese newspaper on 17 November 2019. To date (14 March 2020), 67,790 cases and 3,075 deaths due to the virus have been reported in Hubei province; a case fatality rate (CFR) of 4.54%.
  - Scientists report in a preprint to have developed a CRISPR-based strategy, called PAC-MAN (Prophylactic Antiviral Crispr in huMAN cells), that can find and destroy viruses in vitro. However, they weren't able to test PAC-MAN on the actual SARS-CoV-2, use a targeting-mechanism that uses only a very limited RNA-region, haven't developed a system to deliver it into human cells and would need a lot of time until another version of it or a potential successor system might pass clinical trials. In the study published as a preprint they write that the CRISPR-Cas13d-based system could be used prophylactically as well as therapeutically and that it could be implemented rapidly to manage new pandemic coronavirus strains – and potentially any virus – as it could be tailored to other RNA-targets quickly, only requiring a small change. The paper was published on 29 April 2020.

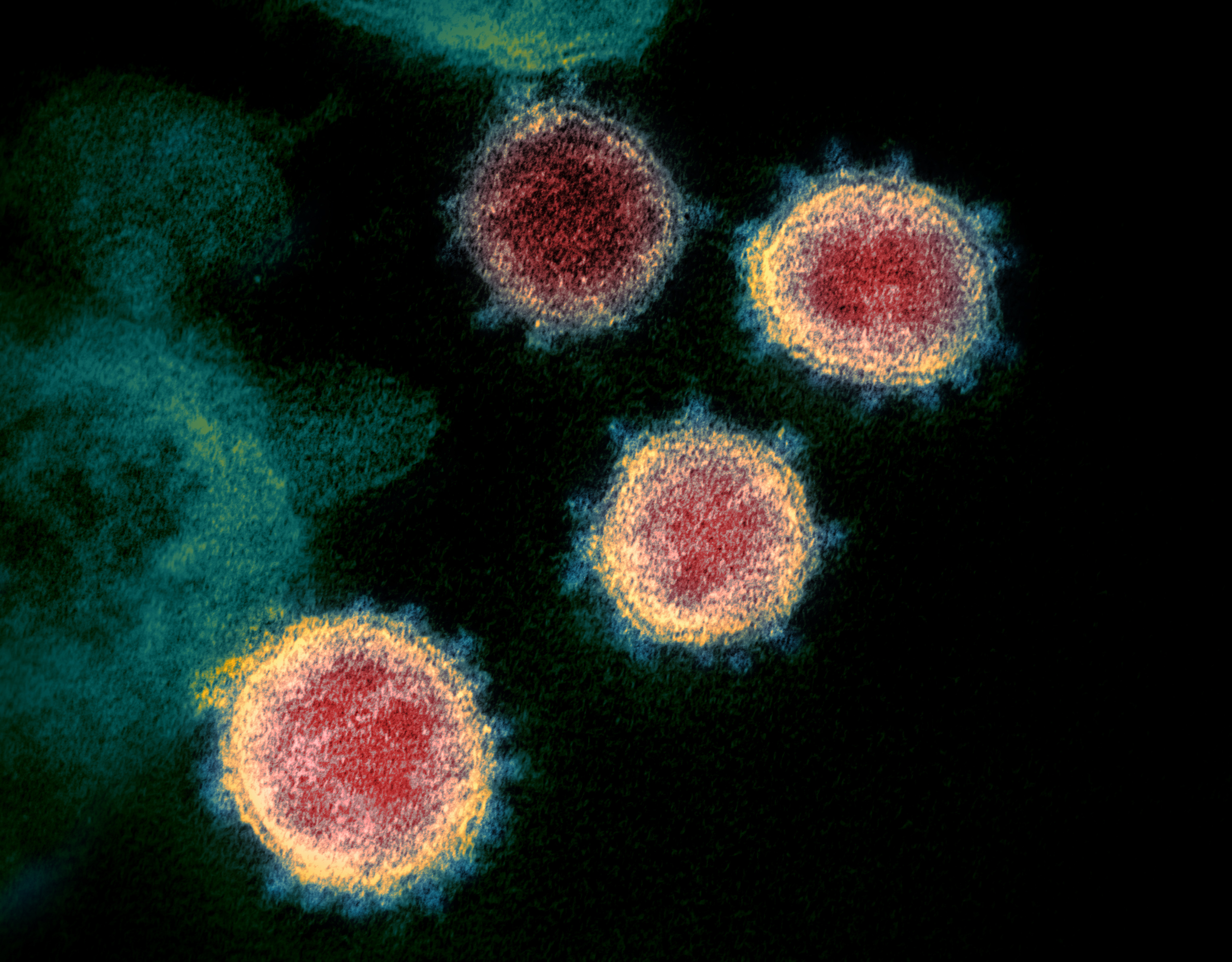
16 March: First human clinical trial of COVID-19 vaccine. The image shows SARS-CoV-2.

- 16 March
  - The first phase 1 clinical trial evaluating a potential vaccine to protect against COVID-19 begins at Kaiser Permanente Washington Health Research Institute (KPWHRI) in Seattle.
  - Astronomers report studies which suggest that parts of the planet Mercury may have been habitable, and perhaps that life forms, albeit likely primitive microorganisms, may have existed on the planet.
  - Researchers report that they have developed a new kind of CRISPR-Cas13d screening platform for effective guide RNA design to target RNA. They used their model to predict optimized Cas13 guide RNAs for all protein-coding RNA-transcripts of the human genome's DNA. Their technology could be used in molecular biology and in medical applications such as for better targeting of virus RNA or human RNA. Targeting human RNA after it's been transcribed from DNA, rather than DNA, would allow for more temporary effects than permanent changes to human genomes. The technology is made available to researchers through an interactive website and free and open source software and is accompanied by a guide on how to create guide RNAs to target the SARS-CoV-2 RNA genome.
  - Researchers evaluate that a limited, regional nuclear conflict between India and Pakistan, using <1% of the worldwide nuclear arsenal, would have adverse consequences for global food security unmatched in modern history. Their comprehensive climate and crop model ensemble simulations suggest that, besides climate perturbations with declines in global mean temperature by 1.8 °C for at least 5 years as evaluated by other researchers and other effects, would have devastating global implications for food production with 20 to 50% losses on average for 11% of the world population for 5 years and could exceed the largest famine in documented history.
  - Researchers publish a paper in which they evaluate the potential for carbon sequestration in soils and found that properly managed soils would be a natural climate solution which could contribute a quarter of absorption on land – 5.5 billion tonnes annually. Roughly 40 percent of this absorption could be achieved by preserving existing soil instead of using it for agriculture and plantation growth. The researchers recommend strategies for slowing or halting ongoing expansion of such land-use and shifting incentive structures in agriculture towards payments for ecosystem-related services.
  - Scientists predict what the earliest proteins looked like 3.5 billion to 2.5 billion years ago. They found two recurring protein folds to be central to the origin of metabolism: ferredoxin and Rossmann-like folds. In turn, these two folds likely shared a common ancestor which may have been the first metabolic enzyme of life and evolved to facilitate electron transfer and catalysis.
  - Scientists present new multiplexed CRISPR technology, called CHyMErA (Cas Hybrid for Multiplexed Editing and Screening Applications), that can be used to analyse which or how genes act together by simultaneously removing multiple genes or gene-fragments using both Cas9 and Cas12a.

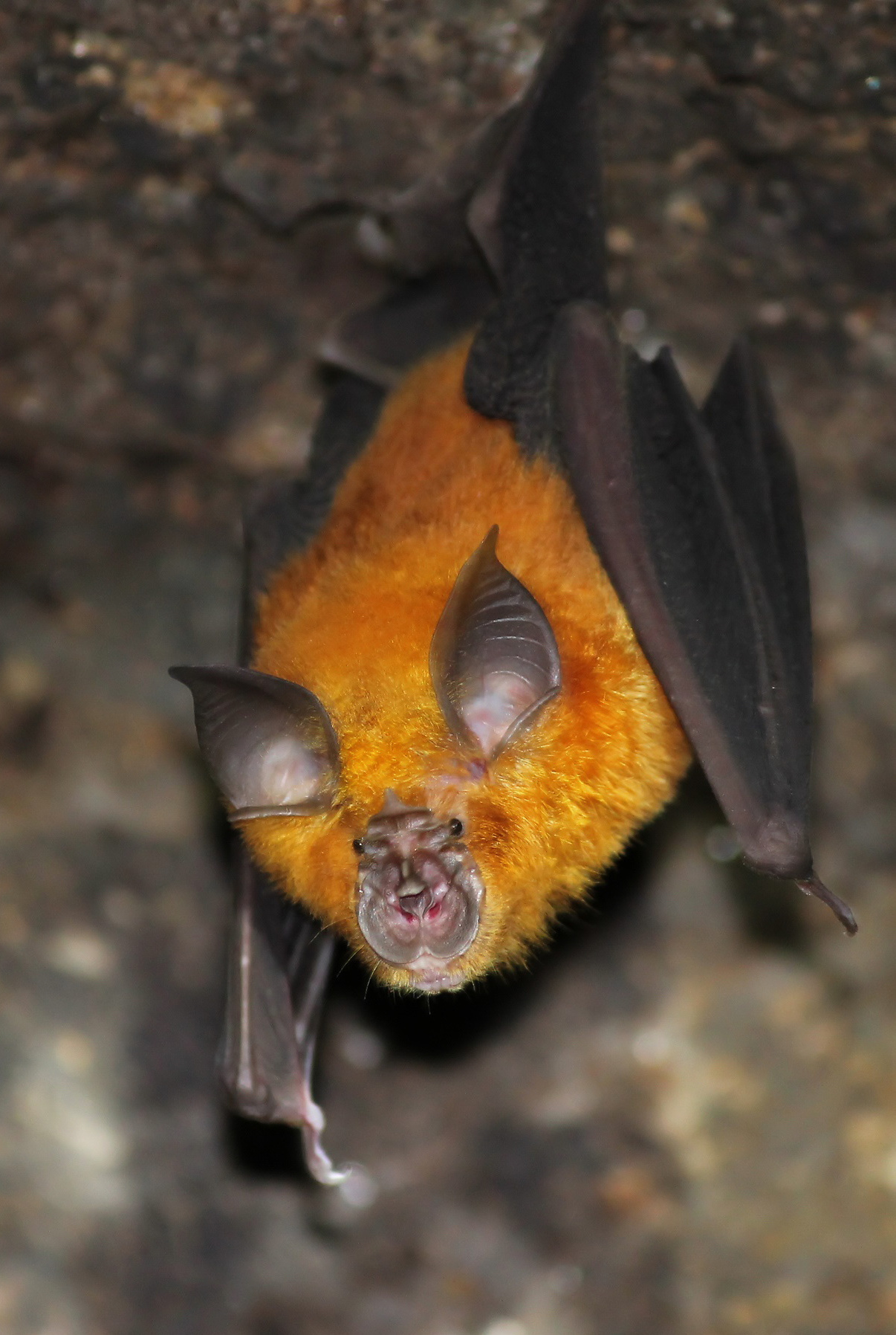
17 March: Scientists report that the novel SARS-CoV-2 virus, which causes the Coronavirus disease 2019, and is responsible for the COVID-19 pandemic, originated naturally, possibly from a bat.

- 17 March – Scientists report that the novel SARS-CoV-2 virus, which causes the COVID-19 disease, and is responsible for the COVID-19 pandemic, originated naturally, and not otherwise, although Chinese medical researchers, including Shi Zhengli, in Wuhan, China, were studying bat coronaviruses in ways that included modifying virus genomes to enter human cells, as early as 2014, in testing laboratories that were determined to have significant safety issues by U.S. scientists in 2018.
- 18 March
  - Paleontologists report the discovery of Asteriornis maastrichtensis, the world's oldest known modern bird, found in rocks dating to between 66.8m and 66.7m years ago.
  - Astronomers propose a way of better seeing more of the rings in the first black hole image.
  - Paleontologists report the discovery and analysis of an Elpistostege watsoni fish fossil which suggest that the vertebrate hand evolved primarily from a skeletal pattern in the fin of elpistostegalians. Their findings provide insights into the transition from fishes to tetrapods and show that digits already arose in fish.
- 19 March
  - A US Army laboratory announces that its scientists analysed a Rydberg sensor's sensitivity to oscillating electric fields over an enormous range of frequencies—from 0 to 10^12 Hertz (the spectrum to 0.3mm wavelength). The Rydberg sensor may potentially be used detect communications signals as it could reliably detect signals over the entire spectrum and compare favourably with other established electric field sensor technologies, such as electro-optic crystals and dipole antenna-coupled passive electronics.
  - Satellite data show that air pollution was reduced significantly in countries worldwide after lockdowns and other interventions due to the COVID-19 pandemic. The sudden shift has been called the "largest scale experiment ever" in terms of the reduction of industrial emissions.

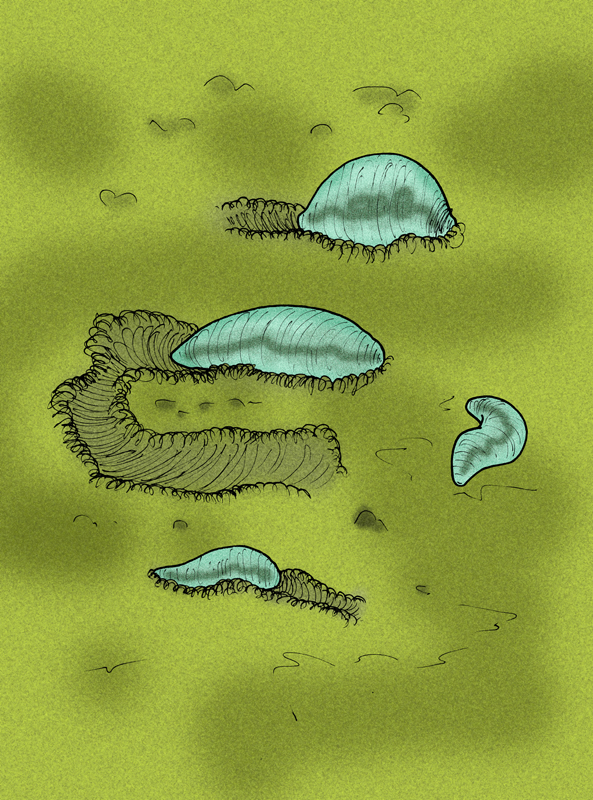
23 March: Discovery reported of Ikaria wariootia (dated to as early as 571 Ma) that could be the earliest animal having two symmetric sides and two openings linked by a digestive tract.

- 20 March
  - Scientists report that they made a C. elegans worm synthesize, fabricate, and assemble bioelectronic materials in its brain cells. They leveraged the cellular systems of the living organism to build insulating and conducting polymers at the plasma membrane of neurons by genetically editing its neurons to produce the enzyme APEX2 which was then triggered by a chemical substance they immersed the worms in and supplied the molecules of two biocompatible building-materials. This enabled modulation of membrane properties in specific neuron populations and manipulation of behavior in the living animals and might be useful in the study and treatments for diseases such as multiple sclerosis.
  - The World Health Organization announces a large trial of what they consider to be the most promising potential coronavirus treatments at the time. The drugs chosen for testing in the Solidarity Trial are Remdesivir, Chloroquine-Hydroxychloroquine combination and Ritonavir-Lopinavir combination with and without interferon-beta. According to the WHO Director General, the aim of the trial is to "dramatically cut down the time needed to generate robust evidence about what drugs work".
- 23 March
  - Scientists report that they have discovered that Longfin inshore squid can recode RNA using the ADAR2 enzyme in a region-specific manner and outside of the nucleus within neurons: in their axons, which are the longest known to science to date. In 2015 one of the study's co-leading scientists and others discovered that squids manipulate their messenger RNA to change the proteins that will be produced far more than humans do.
  - Scientists report that they have discovered one of the oldest bilateria: Ikaria wariootia from the Ediacaran biota (571 to 539 Ma) could be the last ancestor of all animals which have two symmetric sides and two openings linked by a digestive tract.
  - Researchers report that they have found a way to correct for signal loss in a prototype quantum node that can catch, store and entangle bits of quantum information. Their concepts could be used for key components of quantum repeaters in quantum networks and extend their longest possible range.
- 24 March – The reversion of ageing in human cells through nuclear reprogramming to pluripotency was reported in Nature Communications.
- 25 March
  - NASA astronomers report the detection of a large atmospheric magnetic bubble, also known as a plasmoid, released into outer space from the planet Uranus, after reevaluating old data recorded by the Voyager 2 space probe during a flyby of the planet in 1986.
  - Researchers report to have created a nanotechnology-device which can generate high-power terahertz waves, enables picosecond switching of electric signals and get implemented in flexible electronics. It could have applications in imaging, sensing, communications, biomedical applications and smartphone-related electronics.

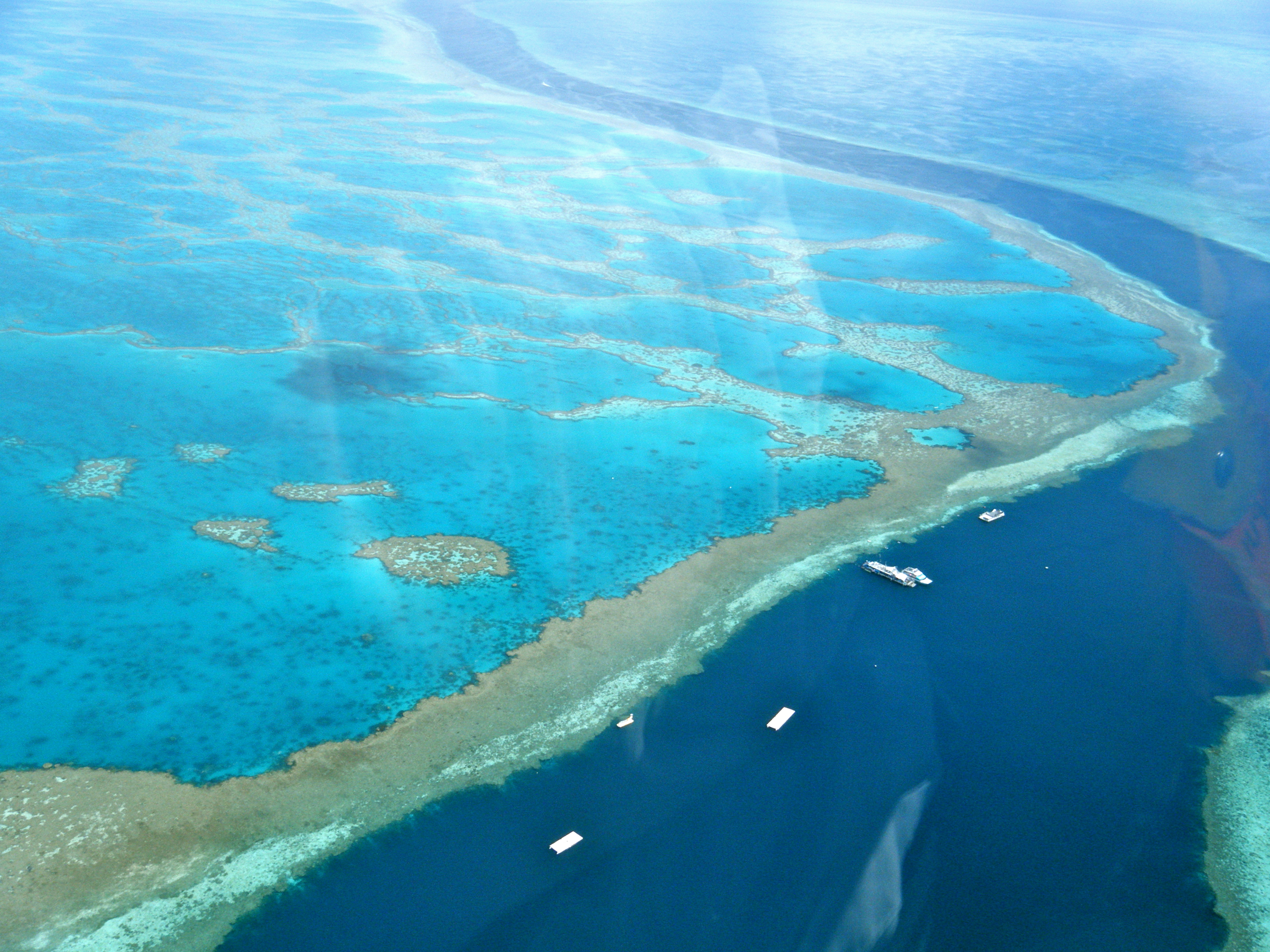
26 March: Third mass coral bleaching event in five years is recorded at the Great Barrier Reef.

- 26 March
  - The United States now has more reported COVID-19 cases than any other country in the world, including China.
  - A third mass coral bleaching event in five years is recorded at the Great Barrier Reef.
  - At a time of the COVID-19 pandemic the safest sex partner is yourself, according to American sex educator Betty Dodson and the New York City Department of Health and Mental Hygiene.
  - The manuscript of a study, which suggests that SARS-CoV-2 likely jumped from pangolins to humans, is published. The study found that a pangolin virus closely resembles the new coronavirus. Therefore, pangolins could be an intermediary host after the virus likely emerged in bats. They recommend that pangolins be removed from wet markets to prevent zoonotic transmission. Others asked for increased pressure on governments to end illegal wildlife trade. Speculations and an unpublished study suggested pangolins might have been intermediate hosts as early as 7 February.
  - After the largest one of the first and largest public volunteer distributed computing projects SETI@home announced its shutdown by 31 March 2020 and due to heightened interest as a result of to the COVID-19 pandemic, the distributed computing project Folding@home becomes the world's first system to reach one exaFLOPS. The system simulates protein folding, is used for medical research on COVID-19 and achieved a speed of approximately 2.43 x86 exaFLOPS by 13 April 2020 – many times faster than the fastest supercomputer Summit.
- 27 March – News outlets, citing a government document, reported that a 57-year-old woman, who tested positive for the coronavirus disease on 10 December 2019, and described in The Wall Street Journal on 6 March 2020, may have been patient zero in the COVID-19 pandemic.

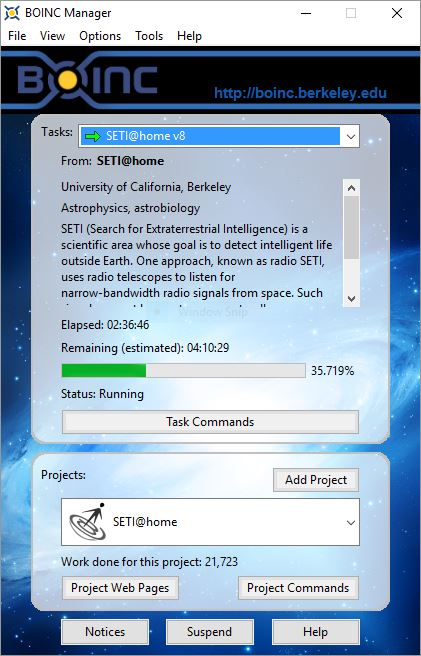
31 March: SETI@home shuts down.

- 29 March – Researchers at the University of Nebraska Medical Center report evidence that Coronavirus disease 2019, related to the COVID-19 pandemic, may be transmitted through the air, and that the loss of smell, and, according to other researchers, loss of taste, could be early signs of infection.
- 31 March
  - A significant rise in anxiety and depression among the UK population is reported following the COVID-19 lockdown. The study, by researchers from the University of Sheffield and Ulster University, finds that people reporting anxiety increased from 17% to 36%, while those reporting depression increased from 16% to 38%.
  - SETI@home, one of the first and largest public volunteer distributed computing projects, shuts down. It sent millions of chunks of telescope data to computers around the world – ca. 144,000 as of March 2020 – which analyse the radio signals to search for extraterrestrial intelligence (SETI) and send back their results. It employed the free BOINC software platform, which was originally developed to support the project and is still being used by numerous other distributed computing projects.
  - A study affirms that DNA from Neanderthal populations from different parts of the world introgressed into modern-day Eurasian DNA.

== Deaths ==
- 1 January
  - János Aczél, Hungarian and Canadian mathematician (b. 1924)
  - Walter Hayman, British mathematician (b. 1926)
- 2 January
  - Robert M. Graham, American computer scientist (b. 1929)
  - Bruce McEwen, American neuroendocrinologist (b. 1938)
  - Edward Spiegel, American astronomer (b. 1931)
- 3 January
  - Reuben Hersh, American mathematician (b. 1927)
  - Joseph Karr O'Connor, American computer scientist (b. 1953)
- 4 January
  - Jack Baldwin, British chemist (b. 1938)
  - John R. Cunningham, Canadian medical physicist (b. 1927)
  - Ding Xieping, Chinese mathematician (b. 1938)
  - K. S. S. Nambooripad, Indian mathematician (b. 1935)
- 5 January – James Barber, British biochemist (b. 1940)
- 6 January
  - Reva Gerstein, Canadian psychologist (b. 1917)
  - Arne Holmgren, Swedish biochemist (b. 1940)
- 7 January
  - Vincenzo Cerundolo, Italian immunologist (b. 1959)
  - Chi Zhiqiang, Chinese pharmacologist (b. 1924)
  - Fritz Hans Schweingruber, Swiss dendrochronologist (b. 1936)
- 8 January – Peter T. Kirstein, British computer scientist (b. 1933)
- 9 January –
  - Robert Molimard, French physician (b. 1927)
  - Geoff Wilson, Australian nuclear physicist (b. 1938)
- 10 January – André Capron, French immunologist (b. 1930)
- 14 January
  - Giovanni Gazzinelli, Brazilian immunologist (b. 1927)
  - Eville Gorham, Canadian ecologist (b. 1925)
- 16 January – László Iván, Hungarian psychiatrist (b. 1933)
- 17 January
  - Peter Clarricoats, British electrical engineer (b. 1932)
  - Steve Rayner, British social scientist (b. 1953)
- 18 January – Stanley Dudrick, American surgeon (b. 1935)
- 19 January
  - David Chadwick, American pediatrician (b. 1926)
  - Richard M. Dudley, American mathematician (b. 1938)
  - Fang Shouxian, Chinese physicist (b. 1932)
  - Anne Wilson Schaef, American psychologist (b. 1934)
- 20 January
  - Emory Kemp, American civil engineering historian (b. 1931)
  - Wendy Havran, American immunologist (b. 1955)
  - Raymond D. Fogelson, American anthropologist (b. 1933)
  - Henry C. Wente, American mathematician (b. 1936)
- 21 January
  - Warren Meck, American psychologist (b. 1956)
  - Boris Tsirelson, Russian and Israeli mathematician (b. 1950)
- 22 January – George F. MacDonald, Canadian anthropologist (b. 1938)
- 23 January – Peter Salama, Australian epidemiologist (b. 1968)
- 24 January – Li Fanghua, Chinese physicist (b. 1932)
- 25 January
  - Vasily Bakalov, Russian military engineer (b. 1929)
  - Liang Wudong, Chinese physician (b. 1959)
- 26 January
  - Louis Nirenberg, Canadian and American mathematician (b. 1925)
  - Maharaj Kishan Bhan, Indian pediatrician (b. 1947)
  - Maurice Sanford Fox, American geneticist and molecular biologist (b. 1924)
- 29 January – Frank Press, American geophysicist (b. 1924)
- 30 January
  - Johannes Geiss, German physicist (b. 1926)
  - Barrie Gilbert, British and American engineer (b. 1937)
  - Richard Hunstead, Australian astronomer (b. 1943)
  - Zhang Changshou, Chinese archeologist (b. 1929)
- 31 January
  - Melvin Seeman, American social psychologist (b. 1918)
  - Donald J. West, British psychiatrist (b. 1924)
- 1 February – Ronald Duman, American psychiatrist (b. 1954)
- 2 February – Philip Leder, American geneticist (b. 1934)
- 3 February – Donald S. Gann, American surgeon (b. 1932)
- 4 February
  - Frank Plummer, Canadian microbiologist (b. 1952)
  - Teodor Shanin, British sociologist (b. 1930)
- 5 February
  - Stanley Cohen, American biochemist and Nobel laureate (b. 1922)
  - Yves Pouliquen, French ophthalmologist (b. 1931)
- 6 February – Wang Jin, Chinese archeologist (b. 1926)
- 7 February
  - Li Wenliang, Chinese ophthalmologist (b. 1986)
  - Hong Ling, Chinese geneticist (b. 1966)
- 9 February
  - Karl-Heinz Rädler, German astrophysicist (b. 1935)
  - Alvin V. Tollestrup, American physicist (b. 1924)
  - John Cadogan, British organic chemist (b. 1930)
- 10 February
  - Robert Hermann, American mathematician (b. 1931)
  - Lin Zhengbin, Chinese surgeon (b. 1957)
- 11 February
  - Louis-Edmond Hamelin, Canadian geographer (b. 1923)
  - Jacques Mehler, French psychologist (b. 1936)
  - Yasumasa Kanada, Japanese computer scientist (b. 1949)
- 12 February
  - Geert Hofstede, Dutch social psychologist (b. 1928)
  - Whitlow Au, American bioacoustics expert (b. 1940)
- 13 February
  - Rajendra K. Pachauri, Indian environmental scientist (b. 1940)
  - Michael Berridge, British biochemist (b. 1938)
- 14 February
  - Robert H. Dyson, American archeologist (b. 1927)
  - Sun Ruyong, Chinese ecologist (b. 1927)
- 15 February
  - Duan Zhengcheng, Chinese industrial engineer (b. 1934)
  - Léon Wurmser, Swiss psychiatrist (b. 1931)
- 16 February
  - Larry Tesler, American computer scientist (b. 1945)
  - Duane Alexander, American pediatrician (b. 1940)
  - John Iliffe, British computer designer (b. 1931)
- 17 February – Per Andersen, Norwegian neuroscientist (b. 1930)
- 18 February
  - José Bonaparte, American paleontologist (b. 1928)
  - Peter Montgomery, American mathematician (b. 1947)
  - Bert Sutherland, American computer scientist (b. 1936)
- 19 February
  - Heather Couper, British astronomer (b. 1949)
  - Wilhelm von der Emde, American civil engineer (b. 1922)
  - Inesa Kozlovskaya, Russian physiologist (b. 1927)
- 20 February
  - Emmanuel Emovon, Nigerian chemist (b. 1929)
  - Jean-Claude Pecker, French astronomer and astrophysicist (b. 1923)
- 22 February
  - Jeff Kimpel, American meteorologist (b. 1942)
  - Mark Zanna, Canadian psychologist (b. 1944)
- 23 February – Zhou Tonghui, Chinese chemist (b. 1924)
- 24 February
  - Katherine Johnson, American mathematician (b. 1918)
  - Robert Cabaj, American psychiatrist (b. 1948)
  - Jiang Yiyuan, Chinese agriculture engineer (b. 1928)
  - Sung Wan Kim, American pharmacologist (b. 1940)
  - Ida Stephens Owens, American biochemist (b. 1939)
- 25 February
  - Peter Pritchard, American herpetologist (b. 1943)
  - Erico Spinadel, Austrian and Argentine industrial engineer (b. 1929)
- 26 February – Bertram Raven, American psychologist (b. 1926)
- 28 February
  - Freeman Dyson, American theoretical physicist and mathematician (b. 1923)
  - John Renton, American geologist (b. 1933)
- 1 March
  - Clara D. Bloomfield, American hematologist (b. 1942)
  - Carsten Bresch, German geneticist (b. 1921)
- 2 March – Vera Pless, American mathematician (b. 1931)
- 3 March – George Preti, American organic chemist (b. 1944)
- 4 March – Jacques Leibowitch, French immunologist (b. 1942)
- 5 March – Lambros Comitas, American anthropologist (b. 1927)
- 7 March – Robert M. Nerem, American biomedical engineer (b. 1937)
- 9 March – Richard K. Guy, British and Canadian mathematician (b. 1916)
- 10 March – John M. Carpenter, American nuclear engineer (b. 1935)
- 14 March – Ofer Bar-Yosef, Israeli archeologist and anthropologist (b. 1937)
- 15 March
  - Tony Lewis, British mathematician (b. 1942)
  - Pilar Luna, Mexican archeologist (b. 1944)
  - Olvi L. Mangasarian, American mathematician (b. 1934)
- 16 March
  - Menachem Friedman, Israeli sociologist (b. 1936)
  - Susan R. Wilson, Australian statistician (b. 1948)
- 17 March
  - Janet Carr, British psychologist (b. 1927)
  - Stephen Schwartz, American pathologist (b. 1942)
- 18 March
  - Alfred Worden, American astronaut (b. 1932)
  - Mark H. A. Davis, British mathematician (b. 1945)
  - William Alfred Weber, American botanist and lichenologist (b. 1918)
- 19 March – Antonio Michele Stanca, Italian geneticist (b. 1942)
- 20 March – Harkishan Singh, Indian chemist (b. 1928)
- 21 March – Robert Klapisch, French physicist (b. 1932)
- 22 March
  - Ciprian Foias, Romanian mathematician (b. 1933)
  - Vintilă Mihăilescu, Romanian anthropologist (b. 1951)
  - Markvard Sellevoll, Norwegian geophysicist (b. 1923)
  - Sultana Zaman, Bangladeshi psychologist (b. 1932)
- 23 March – Pyotr Lysenko, Belarusian archaeologist (b. 1931)
- 24 March
  - Ian Reay Mackay, Australian immunologist (b. 1922)
  - John F. Murray, American pulmonologist (b. 1927)
  - Robert A. Rescorla, American psychologist (b. 1940)
- 26 March
  - Jenny Clack, British palaeontologist (b. 1947)
  - Jean Ginibre, French mathematician (b. 1938)
  - Rolf Huisgen, German chemist (b. 1920)
  - Robin Thomas, American mathematician (b. 1962)
  - Michael J. Tyler, Australian herpetologist (b. 1937)
- 27 March
  - Lanny D. Schmidt, American chemist (b. 1938)
  - Zhou Jun, Chinese botanist (b. 1932)
- 28 March
  - William B. Helmreich, American sociologist (b. 1945)
  - Michel Tibon-Cornillot, French anthropologist (b. 1936)
  - Edoardo Vesentini, Italian mathematician (b. 1928)
- 29 March – Philip W. Anderson, American theoretical physicist and Nobel laureate (b. 1923)
- 30 March
  - Jean-Claude Chamboredon, French sociologist (b. 1938)
  - Kurt W. Fischer, American psychologist (b. 1943)
  - James T. Goodrich, American neurosurgeon (b. 1946)
- 31 March
  - Mark Azbel, Israeli physicist (b. 1932)
  - Richard C. Friedman, American psychiatrist (b. 1941)
  - Reimar Lüst, German astrophysicist (b. 1923)
  - Adolphe Nicolas, French geologist (b. 1936)
  - Michael Wakelam, British molecular biologist (b. 1955)
  - Gita Ramjee, Ugandan and South African HIV researcher (b. 1956)

== See also ==
- Category:Science events
- Category:Science timelines
- Impact of the COVID-19 pandemic on science and technology
  - COVID-19 apps
  - COVID-19 vaccine
  - Face masks during the COVID-19 pandemic
  - Open-source ventilator#COVID-19 pandemic
- List of technologies
- List of emerging technologies
- List of years in science
