= Zhou Jun =

Zhou Jun may refer to:

- Zhou Jun (botanist) (1932–2020), Chinese botanist
- Zhou Jun (weightlifter) (born 1995), Chinese weightlifter
