= Anne Wilson =

Anne Wilson may refer to:

- Anne Wilson (poet) (1848–1930), Australian poet
- Anne Wilson (artist) (born 1949), American artist and educator
- Anne Wilson (musician) (born 2002), American Christian musician
- Anne Wilson Schaef (1934–2020), American psychotherapist and author
- Anne Elizabeth Wilson, American writer
- C. Anne Wilson (1927–2023), British food historian

== See also ==
- Ann Wilson (disambiguation)
- Anna Wilson (disambiguation)
