= Bakalov =

- Pronunciation: /bəˈkɑːlɒv/
- Language: Bulgarian

Origin
- Meaning: A grocer or greengrocer

The Bulgarian patronymic surname Bakalov (Bulgarian: Бакалов; /bəˈkɑːlɒv/) is derived from the Ottoman Turkish word bakkal, which in turn was derived from the Arabic word baqqāl. Translated, it refers to a greengrocer. The name is also found in Russia and Ukraine.

Notable people with this surname include:

- Boris Nicola Bakalov (born 1980), Bulgarian tennis player
- Dimo Bakalov (born 1988), Bulgarian football player
- Igor Bakalov (1939–1992), Soviet sports shooter
- Luis Bacalov (1933–2017), Argentine-born Italian film score composer of Bulgarian descent
- Maria Bakalova (born 1996), Bulgarian actress
- Marin Bakalov (born 1962), Bulgarian football player and coach
- Vasily Bakalov (1929–2020), Soviet and Russian military engineer
- Yuriy Bakalov (born 1966), Ukrainian football midfielder and coach
