= Anna Wilson =

Anna Wilson may refer to:

- Anna Millward (née Wilson, born 1971), Australian cycle racer
- Anna Wilson (madam) (1835–1911), pioneer madam in Omaha, Nebraska
- Anna Wilson (swimmer) (born 1977), New Zealand Olympic swimmer
- Anna Wilson (basketball) (born 1997), American basketball player
- Anna Mae Robertson (1924–2025), née Wilson, United States Army officer
- Anna Wilson (writer), shortlisted author for 2023 James Cropper Wainwright Prize for Children's Writing on Nature and Conservation
- Anna Moriah Wilson (1996–2022), professional cyclist, killed in 2022

== See also ==
- Anna Wilson-Jones, British actress
- Ann Wilson (disambiguation)
- Anne Wilson (disambiguation)
