= Ann Wilson (disambiguation) =

Ann Wilson (born 1950) is an American rock singer.

Ann Wilson may also refer to:

- Ann Wilson (athlete) (born 1949), British athlete
- Ann Wilson (painter) (1931–2023), American painter
- Ann Wilson in Let's Dance 2010
- Ann Wilson, a character in the TV series Grange Hill

== See also ==
- Anne Wilson (disambiguation)
- Anna Wilson (disambiguation)
