= Vasily Bakalov =

Soviet and Russian engineer and designer (1929–2020)

- Василий Иванович Бакалов
- Born: 18 April 1929; Semeyka, Central Black Earth Oblast, RSFSR, Soviet Union
- Died: 25 January 2020 (aged 90); Tula, Russia
- Education: Leningrad Electrotechnical Institute of Communications
- Engineering career
- Discipline: Military engineering Armoured vehicle defence systems Anti-tank guided missiles
- Employer(s): KBP Instrument Design Bureau; TsKIB SOO
- Projects: Drozd
- Awards: Order of the October Revolution; Order of the Red Banner of Labour (twice); Lenin Prize

Vasily Ivanovich Bakalov (Russian: Василий Иванович Бакалов; 18 April 1929 – 25 January 2020) was a Soviet and Russian military engineer and designer who worked on the designs of armoured vehicle defence systems and anti-tank guided missiles.

Born in 1929, Bakalov served during the Second World War in his youth, drawing on his experience with OSVOD, a voluntary organization promoting water safety and work, while crewing vessels to transport military personnel, civilians and weapons. After a period as a machinist in the marine salvage department after the war, he studied at the Leningrad Electrotechnical Institute of Communications, graduating with honours and starting a career as a design engineer at the TsKB-14 design bureau in Tula. Working on guided rocket weapons, Bakalov rose to senior design and management positions, eventually becoming the bureau's chief engineer and overseeing the development of anti-tank guided missiles such as the 9M113 Konkurs, 9K115-2 Metis-M, 9M117 Bastion, and 9M119 Svir/Refleks, and the guided artillery shells 2K25 Krasnopol and 2K22 Tunguska.

In 1978 he was appointed head and chief designer of TsKIB SOO, where he remained until his retirement in September 1997. Bakalov oversaw significant developments in the company's organizational structure, which soon achieved a high reputation for the quality of its products. The Soviet team for the shooting competitions at the 1980 Summer Olympics in Moscow all used weapons designed and manufactured by TsKIB SOO. Among the designs developed under his supervision was the Drozd active protection system for tanks and armoured vehicles for use against anti-tank missiles and rocket-propelled grenades. Over his career he received a number of honours and awards, including the Lenin Prize, and held around 150 patents.

== Early life and wartime ==
Bakalov was born on 18 April 1929 in the village of Semeyka, in Central Black Earth Oblast, then part of the RSFSR, in the Soviet Union. His father moved the family to a city in the 1930s seeking work, and the young Bakalov joined OSVOD, a voluntary organization promoting water safety and work. With the Axis invasion of the Soviet Union in 1941, Bakalov and other OSVOD members were called up to support the war effort by crewing vessels to transport military personnel, civilians and weapons. During the war he studied at the special school of the 4th military recovery unit, graduating in August 1945 and going on to serve with the marine salvage department as a machinist, working aboard the tugboats Stalingrad and Chapaev to salvage vessels sunk during the war.

== Tula and design work ==
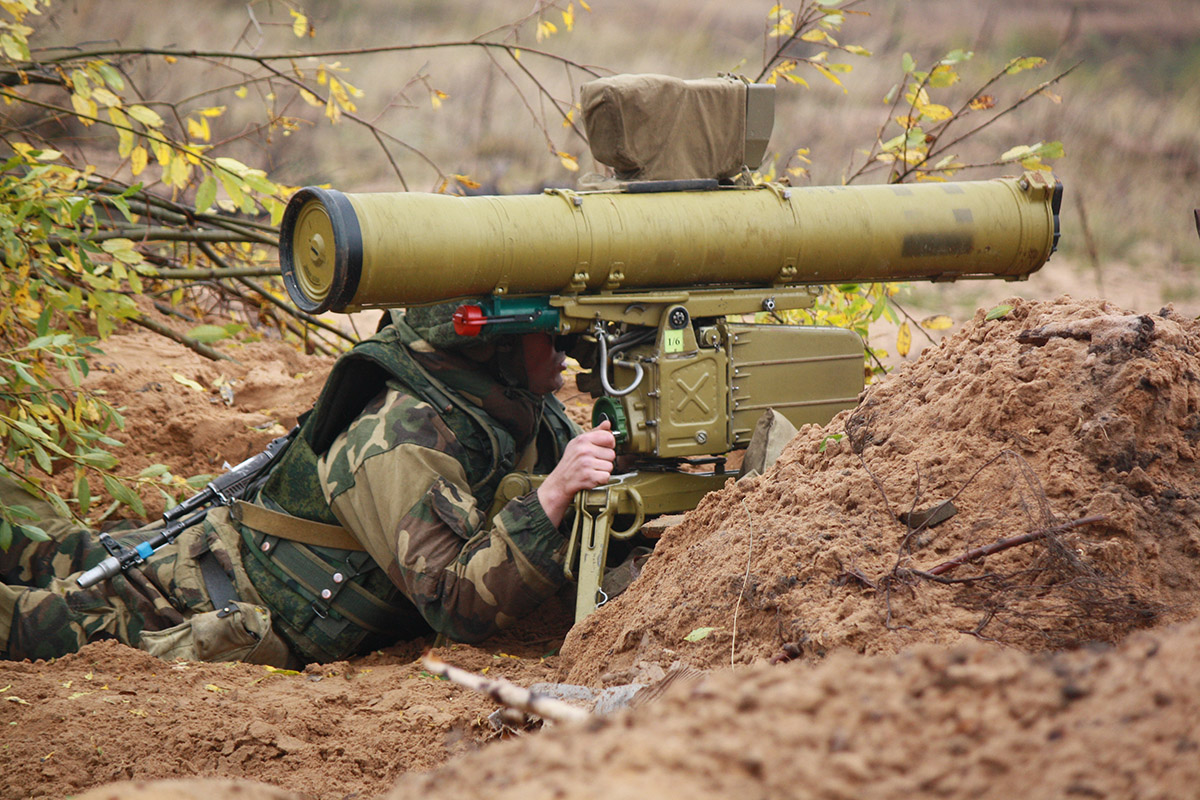
The anti-tank guided missile system 9M113 Konkurs, developed under Bakalov's leadership

In 1948 Bakalov enrolled in the Electrical Engineering College in Alma-Ata, graduating with honours, and then entering the Leningrad Electrotechnical Institute of Communications. He was awarded a Stalin scholarship in his second year, and also worked as a laboratory assistant at the Budyonny Military Academy of the Signal Corps. He took part in student life and the institute, becoming head of the student scientific society and a member of the scientific council. Bakalov graduated with honours in 1957 and went to Tula with his wife, arriving on 5 August 1957 to work as a design engineer at the TsKB-14 design bureau, later the KBP Instrument Design Bureau. The bureau was in the process of creating a division to develop guided rocket weapons and Bakalov distinguished himself in this field. In 1960 he became head of the laboratory, and in 1961 head of his design department, followed by his appointment in 1968 as first deputy chief and chief designer, and then chief engineer of the KBP Instrument Design Bureau. Bakalov's work revolved around the development of anti-tank guided missiles, overseeing projects including the anti-tank guided missiles 9M113 Konkurs, 9K115-2 Metis-M, 9M117 Bastion, and 9M119 Svir/Refleks, and the guided artillery shells 2K25 Krasnopol and 2K22 Tunguska.

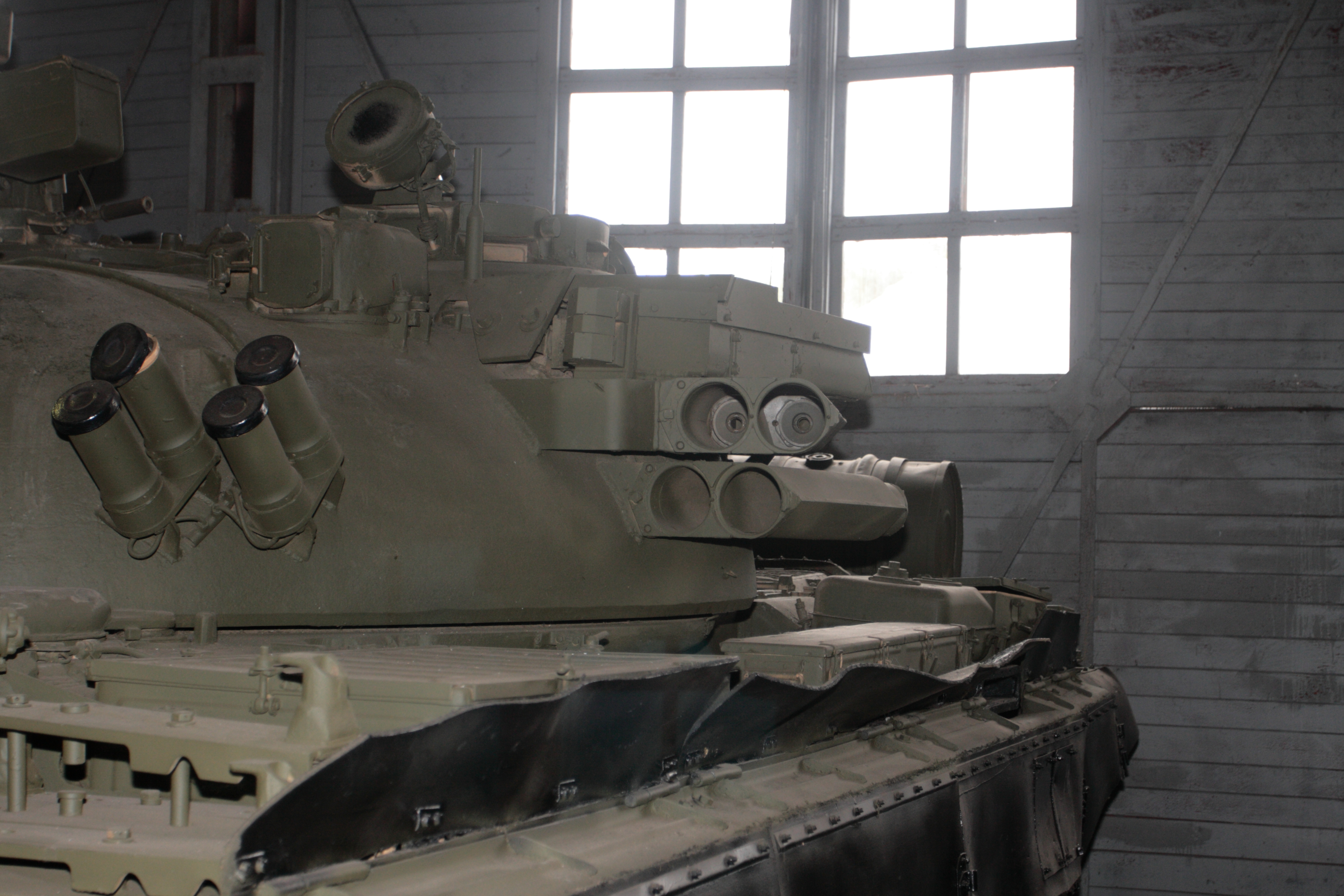
The Drozd active protection system on a T-55AD tank

In November 1978 he was appointed head and chief designer of TsKIB SOO, where he remained until his retirement in September 1997. TsKIB SOO, in full the "Central Design and Research Bureau of Sports and Hunting Weapons", specialized in the development and manufacture of sports and hunting weapons, small arms, anti-tank and anti-personnel grenade launchers, machine-gun turrets and small-calibre artillery naval anti-aircraft installations. Bakalov oversaw significant developments in the company's organizational structure, which soon achieved a high reputation for the quality of its products. The Soviet team for the shooting competitions at the 1980 Summer Olympics in Moscow all used MTs brand weapons designed and manufactured by TsKIB SOO. Among the designs developed under his supervision was the Drozd active protection system for tanks and armoured vehicles for use against anti-tank missiles and rocket-propelled grenades. For his work on this Bakalov received the Lenin Prize. He also held around 150 patents on other inventions. In addition to his focus on the technical and business-related side of his work at the bureau, he also interested himself in the social side. He was instrumental in the establishment of the Yasniy Bereg recreation centre in Tula's Dubensky District.

== Retirement and awards ==
Though officially retiring in September 1997, he continued to act as an adviser to TsKIB SOO's general director. His working career ultimately spanned over 60 years. Bakalov died on 25 January 2020 at the age of 90. His funeral was held on 29 January at the Church of Saint Nicholas in Tula. He was then interred on the Alley of Honour in the city's Smolensky Cemetery.

Over his career Bakalov received the Lenin Prize, the S. I. Mosin Prize and the Prize of the Russian Ministry of Defence. He had also received the Order of the October Revolution, two Orders of the Red Banner of Labour, and the jubilee medals "In Commemoration of the 100th Anniversary of the Birth of Vladimir Ilyich Lenin", "50 Years of Victory in the Great Patriotic War 1941–1945" and "300 Years of the Russian Navy". He had also received the honorary titles of "Veteran of Labor", "Honorary Radio Operator", and "Honorary Worker of the Arms Industry". On 26 August 2009 the Tula city duma awarded Bakalov the title of "Honorary Citizen of the Hero City of Tula." He was married, with two sons and a daughter.
