= Fritz Hans Schweingruber =

Swiss dendrochronologist (1936–2020)

Fritz Hans Schweingruber (29 February 1936 – 7 January 2020) was a Swiss dendrochronologist and emeritus professor.

== Biography ==
Fritz Schweingruber was first a primary school teacher and organist. Until 1965 he taught for nine years at multi-class schools in Emmental. Afterwards he studied botany, zoology, geology as well as prehistory and early history at the University of Bern and then wood biology at the ETH Zurich. An encounter with the Austrian botanist Bruno Huber sparked his interest in dendrochronology. In 1972 he graduated in systematic plant sociology.

After teaching biology at Gymnasium Köniz high school near Bern and at the private school "Dr. Feusi", he started in 1971, at the Swiss Federal Institute for Forest, Snow and Landscape Research WSL in Birmensdorf. There he set up the dendrochronology research group. In 1976 he was appointed as an associate professor at the University of Basel with a Habilitation on "Prehistoric Wood".

== Research and works ==
At WSL, Fritz Schweingruber built the Northern Hemisphere dendroclimatological data network in collaboration with Keith Briffa from the University of East Anglia's Climatic Research Unit in Norwich, Eugen Vaganov Siberian Federal University in Krasnoyarsk and Stepan Shiyatov Ural Federal University in Ekaterinburg.

He organized expeditions to Western Europe, USA, Canada and Siberia. He educated students of the universities of Basel. Zurich, Bern, Stuttgart, Grenoble, Marseille, Tehran and Abakan (Russia). He initiated the "International dendroecological fieldweeks" (from 1986) and the "International Course on Wood Anatomy and Tree-Ring Ecology" (from 2001) and led the latter until 2019.

After his retirement in 2001, he pursued his research as a guest researcher at the Swiss Federal Research Institute WSL, with a focus on the taxonomic-anatomical-dendrochronological analysis of herbs and dwarf shrubs. One of his most important projects was the dating and anatomy of high mountain plants in the Alps and the Himalayas.

His publications in English include the textbooks Trees and wood in dendrochronology (1993), Tree rings and environment. Dendroecology (1996), Wood structure and environment (2007) and The Plant Stem (2018).

== Honors and awards ==
- 2002: Honorary President of the Association for Tree Ring Research
- 2018: Honorary Member of the International Association of Wood Anatomists

== Interview ==
- International Course on Wood Anatomy & Tree-Ring Ecology, Klosters, Switzerland, 2016. Klosters, Switzerland: Swiss federal institute for forest, snow and landscape research WSL. November 30, 2016.

== Selected publications ==
- Schweingruber, Fritz H.; Börner, Annett (2018). The plant stem. A microscopic aspect. Cham: Springer. p. 207. doi:10.1007/978-3-319-73524-5. ISBN 978-3-319-73523-8. S2CID 49190885.
- Schweingruber, Fritz H.; Börner, Annett; Schulze, Ernst-Detlef (2011). Atlas of stem anatomy in herbs, shrubs und trees. Vol. 1. Berlin, Heidelberg: Springer. p. 495. doi:10.1007/978-3-642-77157-6. ISBN 978-3-642-11637-7. S2CID 35705868.
- Schweingruber, Fritz H. (1996). Tree rings and environment dendroecology. Berne, Stuttgart, Vienna: Haupt. p. 609. ISBN 978-3-258-05458-2.
- Schweingruber, Fritz H. (1993). Trees and Wood in Dendrochronology. Springer Series in Wood Science. Berlin, Heidelberg: Springer. p. 402. doi:10.1007/978-3-642-77157-6. ISBN 978-3-642-77157-6. S2CID 35705868.
- Further publications
