= IRAS 13224−3809 =

Galaxy containing well-studied supermassive black hole

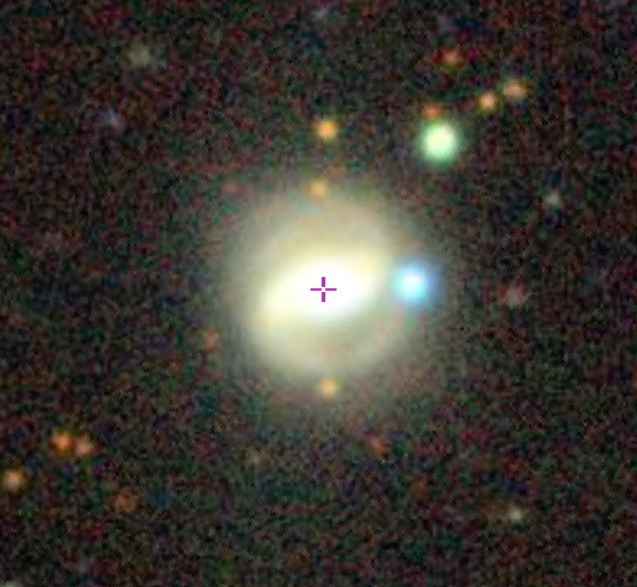
- DESI Legacy Surveys image of IRAS 13224−3809

Observation data (J2000 epoch)
- Constellation: Centaurus
- Right ascension: 13^{h} 25^{m} 19.38^{s}
- Declination: −38° 24′ 52.61″
- Redshift: 0.06580 ± 0.00018
- Distance: 1 billion light-years
- Apparent magnitude (V): 13.80

Other designations
- 2MASX J13251937−3824524; 2MASS J13251937−3824526; GSC 07787–00931; IRAS F13224−3809; PGC 88835; 1RXS J132519.4−382445; WISE J132519.39−382452.5; Gaia DR2 6162481890199388928

IRAS 13224−3809 is a highly active and fluctuating Seyfert 1 galaxy in the constellation Centaurus about 1 billion light-years from Earth. The galaxy is notable due to its centrally located supermassive black hole that is closely studied by astronomers using x-ray astronomy, particularly X-ray reverberation echo mapping techniques, in an effort to better understand the inner workings, including mass and spin, of black holes.

X-Ray reverberation echo studies of black holes (video; 3:33)
