= Lucas Lombriser =

Swiss theoretical physicist

Lucas Lombriser (born 12 April 1982) is a Swiss National Science Foundation Professor at the Department of Theoretical Physics, University of Geneva. His research is in Theoretical Cosmology, Dark Energy, and Alternative Theories of Gravity. In 2020 and 2021 Lombriser proposed that the Hubble tension and other discrepancies between cosmological measurements imply significant evidence that we are living in a Hubble Bubble of 250 million light years in diameter which is 20% less dense than the cosmic average and lowers the locally measured cosmic microwave background temperature over its cosmic average. Previously, in 2019, he has proposed a solution to the cosmological constant problem from arguing that Newton's constant varies globally. In 2015 and 2016, Lombriser predicted the measurement of the gravitational wave speed with a neutron star merger and that this would rule out alternative theories of gravity as the cause of the late-time accelerated expansion of our Universe, a prediction that proved true with GW170817. Lombriser is a member of the Romansh-speaking minority in Switzerland.

== Education and career ==
Lombriser did a Master in Physics at ETH Zurich in 2008 and completed his PhD at the Institute for Theoretical Physics, University of Zurich in 2011. His thesis advisor was Uroš Seljak. Lombriser did postdoctoral research at the Institute of Cosmology and Gravitation, University of Portsmouth and the Institute of Astronomy, Royal Observatory Edinburgh, University of Edinburgh. He joined the Department of Theoretical Physics, University of Geneva in January 2018 on a Swiss National Science Foundation Professorship.

He is an Affiliate Member of the Higgs Centre for Theoretical Physics, University of Edinburgh.

== Research ==
Lombriser's research is in Theoretical Cosmology, Dark Energy, and Alternative Theories of Gravity. In 2010 he was part of a research group that succeeded in making the first measurement of the $E_G$ quantity, a model-independent estimator for gravitational interactions at cosmological distances. In 2015 and 2016, Lombriser predicted the measurement of the gravitational wave speed with a neutron star merger and that this would rule out alternative theories of gravity as the cause of the late-time accelerated expansion of our Universe. This prediction and its implications became reality with GW170817. In 2019, he proposed the additional global variation of the General Relativistic Einstein-Hilbert action with respect to Newton's constant. This leads to a constraint equation upon Einstein's field equations which, after evaluation over the observable Universe, provides a solution to the decades-old cosmological constant problem. In March 2020 Lombriser proposed that the much-debated Hubble tension implies significant evidence that we are living in a Hubble Bubble that is 250 million light years in diameter and is 20% less dense than the cosmic average. In April 2021 his team showed that this results in a higher cosmic microwave background temperature than measured locally, which eases further cosmological tensions.

Lombriser is involved in the Euclid space telescope mission of the European Space Agency (ESA) and the Euclid Consortium. He is also involved in the ESA Laser Interferometer Space Antenna (LISA) gravitational wave observatory. He is the PI of the DeepThought Project.

In June 2023, Lombriser reported an alternative way of interpreting the available scientific data which suggested that the notion of an expanding universe may be more a "mirage" than an actuality.

== Media ==
Lombriser has given several interviews on his research work and life in the Swiss Romansh-speaking media, including TV, radio, and newspaper articles. He has also spoken on BBC Radio Scotland. His research works from 2010, 2016, 2019, 2020, and 2021 have received broad attention by news outlets worldwide.
