= Michel Tibon-Cornillot =

French anthropologist (1936–2020)

- Born: 10 February 1936; Paris, France
- Died: 28 March 2020 (aged 84); Paris, France
- Occupations: Philosopher; Anthropologist

Michel Tibon-Cornillot (10 February 1936 – 28 March 2020) was a French philosopher and anthropologist. He directed research at the School for Advanced Studies in the Social Sciences (EHESS). He had an interest in the evolution of technology in the field of biology, leading to his authoring of the book Les Corps transfigurés.

== Biography ==
Tibon-Cornillot earned an agrégation and a doctorate in philosophy. He was highly interested in mathematics, and his discussions with René Thom led him to the philosophical fields of complexity and chaos. He worked at the Pasteur Institute's bacterial molecular genetics labs. He was also a lecturer in technical anthropology at EHESS. His research in the philosophy of science led him to work on issues related to drug addiction.

Tibon-Cornillot was a medical adviser to Minister of Health Bernard Kouchner.

In opposition to GMOs, he supported José Bové during the 2007 French presidential election, with Nicolas Sarkozy as victor.

In 2014, Tibon-Cornillot ran for the European Parliament in the Constituency of Île-de-France.

== Publications ==
=== Books ===
- Les Corps transfigurés : mécanisation du vivant et imaginaire de la biologie (1992)
- Le Triomphe des bactéries : la Fin des antibiotiques ? (2006)

=== Articles ===
- Multiple contributions to the magazine Nécessaire
- Contagion médiatique et diffusion épidémique : les mises en scène du corps moderne (1996)
- M. Tibon-Cornillot : contre le discours éthique abstrait (1998)
- En route vers la planète radieuse - déferlement des techniques, insolence philosophique (2003)
- Généalogie coloniale du Dalaï-Lama (2008)
- Une pétrification foudroyante, le temps d'après la "collision Fukushima" (2012)
- Déferlement des techniques contemporaines : instabilité, disparition des sociétés industrielles (2013)
