= Semeyka =

Semeyka Семейка
- Selo
- Location within Voronezh Oblast Location within Russia
- Coordinates: 50°19′N 39°58′E
- Country: Russia
- Region: Voronezh Oblast
- District: Podgorensky District
- Time zone: UTC+3:00

Semeyka (Russian: Семе́йка) is a rural locality (a selo) and the administrative center of Semeyskoye Rural Settlement, Podgorensky District, Voronezh Oblast, Russia. The population was 325 as of 2010. There are 3 streets.

== Geography ==
Semeyka is located 35 km southeast of Podgorensky (the district's administrative centre) by road. Saprino is the nearest rural locality.
