= Zhou Jun (botanist) =

Chinese scientist (1932–2020)

- 周俊
- Born: February 5, 1932; Dongtai, Jiangsu, China
- Died: March 27, 2020 (aged 88); Kunming, Yunnan, China
- Education: East China University of Science and Technology
- Spouse: Chen Siying
- Children: 3
- Scientific career
- Fields: Plant resources Phytochemistry
- Workplaces: Kunming Institute of Botany

Zhou Jun (Chinese: 周俊; pinyin: Zhōu Jùn; 5 February 1932 – 27 March 2020) was a Chinese scientist specializing in plant resources and phytochemistry. He was a member of the Chinese Communist Party and an academician of the Chinese Academy of Sciences.

== Biography ==
Zhou was born into a family of teachers, in Dongtai, Jiangsu, on February 5, 1932. He had five brothers. He elementary studied at the School affiliated to Danyang National Institute of Social Education and secondary studied at Nanjing National Pharmaceutical School. After graduation, he worked at East China Pharmaceutical College and then East China Health Bureau. He joined the Chinese Communist Party in April 1949. In September 1954, he was accepted to East China Institute of Chemical Technology (now East China University of Science and Technology), where he majored in pharmaceutical engineering. After graduating in September 1958, he was dispatched to Kunming Institute of Botany, where he was promoted to associate research fellow in 1978 and to research fellow in 1986. He was its director in January 1983, and held that office until January 1990. On March 27, 2020, he died of illness in Kunming, Yunnan, at the age of 88.

== Personal life ==
Zhou married Chen Siying (陈泗英), they had three children.

== Honors and awards ==
- October 1999 Member of the Chinese Academy of Sciences (CAS)
