= Anne Wilson Schaef =

American psychotherapist and author (1934–2020)

- Born: March 22, 1934; Siloam Springs, Arkansas, U.S.
- Died: January 19, 2020 (aged 85); Arkansas, U.S.
- Education: Washington University in St. Louis; Union Institute (PhD)
- Occupations: Clinical psychologist; author
- Scientific career
- Fields: Psychotherapy

Anne Wilson Schaef (March 22, 1934 – January 19, 2020) was an American clinical psychologist and author. Her book When Society Becomes an Addict, in which she compared Western culture to an active alcoholic, made the New York Times bestseller list and was nominated for Best Political Book of the Year.

== Early life and education ==
Anne Wilson Schaef was born on March 22, 1934, in Siloam Springs, Arkansas. She claimed to have been raised in the traditional Cherokee way by her mother and her great-grandmother; nevertheless, she never provided evidence to back that claim.

Schaef completed her undergraduate degree in Pre-Med/Psychology at Washington University in St. Louis and went on to earn a Ph.D. in clinical psychology from Union Institute in Ohio and an honorary doctorate in Human Letters from Kenyon College in Gambier, Ohio.

== Career ==
She went on to practice for many years in several different capacities, ranging from school psychologist to consulting for major corporations. For years she also ran her own private practice for individuals, couples and groups; major corporations; government; and profit and non-profit organizations. After practicing for many years, in 1984 she left the field of psychology and psychotherapy.

Schaef then developed her own practice called Living in Process, and wrote 18 books including the New York Times bestseller When Society Becomes an Addict, where she compared western culture to an active alcoholic.

She was also one of the owners of Boulder Hot Springs, an historic, traditional hot springs/hotel, which a group (spearheaded by Schaef) saved from demolition in 1989. This hotel has continuously been restored since then and was re-opened as an Inn, Spa, and Retreat Center in 1991.

She continued to write and participate with her Living in Process network for the rest of her life. She died at her home in Arkansas on January 19, 2020, at the age of 85.

== Writing ==
In 1981, Schaef published her book Women's Reality, which went on to become a teaching tool in women's studies and other educational programs around the world. This book, subtitled An Emerging Female System in a White Male Society was part of her lifelong work championing women's issues. She published a follow up to Women's Reality in 2016 with a book titled There Will Be a Thousand Years of Peace and Prosperity and They Will Be Ushered in by the Women.

Schaef worked in the addiction recovery field throughout the last decades, making substantial contributions through several books, including Codependence: Misunderstood, Mistreated, which "revolutionized our understanding of the addictive process". She also wrote extensively on what she saw happening in the culture while developing the Living in Process work.

Schaef's book When Society Becomes an Addict was a New York Times bestseller and nominated for Best Political Book of the Year, and several of her books have been bestsellers throughout the world. Her books have been translated into many languages and one of her daily meditation books, Meditations for Women Who Do Too Much, sold millions of copies worldwide.

== Living in Process network ==
Schaef left the field of psychotherapy and began holding "Living Process Intensives", meditation sessions, claiming that "trusting the process" is sufficient to effect healing.

== Published works ==
- Women's Reality. HarperCollins, 1981. ISBN 9780062507709
- Co-Dependence: Misunderstood, Mistreated. HarperCollins, 1986. ISBN 9780062507693
- When Society Becomes an Addict. HarperCollins, 1987. ISBN 9780062548542
- The Addictive Organization. HarperCollins, 1988. ISBN 9780062548740
- Escape from Intimacy. HarperCollins, 1989. ISBN 9780062548733
- Laugh! (I Thought I'd Die if I Didn't). Penguin Random House, 1990. ISBN 9780345360977
- Meditations for Women Who Do Too Much Journal, 1992. ISBN 0062548662
- Beyond Therapy, Beyond Science. iUniverse, 1992. ISBN 9780595150533
- Native Wisdom for White Minds. Penguin Random House, 1995. ISBN 9780345394057
- Meditations for People Who (May) Worry Too Much. Penguin Random House, 1996. ISBN 9780345394064
- Living in Process. Wellspring/Ballantine, 1998. ISBN 0345435672
- Meditations for Living in Balance. HarperCollins, 2000. ISBN 9780062516435
- Meditations for Women Who Do Too Much (revised edition). HarperCollins, 2004. [1990]. ISBN 9780062275738
- Becoming a Hollow Bone. Council Oak Books, 2014. ISBN 1571783245
- There Will be a Thousand Years of Peace and Prosperity and They Will Be Ushered in by the Women (Two Volumes). iUniverse, 2016. ISBN 9781491795286
- Daily Reminders for Living a New Paradigm. Penguin Random House, 2017. ISBN 9781401952402
- Living in Process (revised edition). iUniverse, 2018. ISBN 9781532030529
- Tales of the Klamath River. iUniverse, 2018. ISBN 9781532050541
- Women Who Do Too Much Page-A-Day Calendar. Workman Publishing Company, yearly from 1992 to 2021 (2021). ISBN 9781523509638
- "Why Failure Can Change Your Life – For the Better".
- "Is the Church an Addictive Organization?"

== Interviews and speeches ==
- Living Hero with Jari Chevalier Podcast interview with Anne Wilson Schaef, 2010: http://jari.podbean.com/2010/02/01/interview-with-anne-wilson-schaef/
- Anne Wilson Schaef Video – Speaking on "Living the New Paradigm": https://www.youtube.com/watch?v=QrwIP_oH9f8
- Anne Wilson Schaef Audio – When Society Becomes an Addict: https://www.youtube.com/watch?v=6jmK9QnXwoI
- Anne Wilson Schaef Talk 2018 – The Role of Healing from Addiction from the Personal to the Planetary Level: https://vimeo.com/ondemand/aws
- Debra Engle Talks to Anne Wilson Schaef About Detaching with Love, 2019: https://www.youtube.com/watch?v=2oDJzVOCrrg
