= 2020 in France =

- Decades: 2000s; 2010s; 2020s; 2030s
- See also: History of France; Timeline of French history; List of years in France

Events in the year 2020 in France.

== Incumbents ==
- President – Emmanuel Macron (REM)
- Prime Minister – Édouard Philippe (LR) (before 3 July), Jean Castex (REM)

== Events ==
Ongoing — COVID-19 pandemic in France

=== January ===
- 3 January – Villejuif stabbing where a man kills one person and wounds two others with a knife before the perpetrator is shot dead by police.
- 18 January – French police call for backup as protesters try to storm a theater where President Emmanuel Macron and his wife are watching The Fly.
- 20 January – Annie Chapelier, member of the National Assembly for Gard's 4th constituency, leaves LREM. She denounces "an above-ground movement, indifferent to the territories" where "little more or less self-proclaimed chiefs" want to be superior to "a mass, insignificant in their eyes, who is asked for blind allegiance and obedience", as well as inaction in the face of the "climate emergency".
- 24 January – The first cases of COVID-19 are confirmed in France: one in Bordeaux, a Chinese native of Wuhan who lives and works in the Bordeaux region, and two in Paris, a couple of Chinese tourists.

=== February ===
- 7 February – Five new cases of COVID-19, four adults and one child, are announced by the Minister of Health Agnès Buzyn. The initial case is a British national returning from Singapore where he stayed from 20 to 23 January. He has arrived in France on 24 January for a four-day stay in the town of Les Contamines-Montjoie before returning to United Kingdom.
- 8 February – Triggering of the Alerte-Enlèvement Device (Alert-Removal Device): the plan is launched after the kidnapping of Vanille, a 1-year-old girl by her mother Nathalie, 40, in Angers, on 7 February around 5:30 pm. Nathalie is found in Nantes on 9 February. A few hours later, the public prosecutor of Angers announces that Vanille has been found dead, in a clothing dumpster, and that her mother has admitted to having killed her. It is the first time since the launch of the Alert-Removal Device in France that the abducted child has been found dead.
- 11 February – Death of François André, member of the French National Assembly for Ille-et-Vilaine's 3rd constituency. He is replaced by his substitute.
- 16 February – Resignation of Agnès Buzyn, Minister of Solidarity and Health, following her candidacy for mayor of Paris.
- 21 February – Shutdown of reactor 1 at the Fessenheim Nuclear Power Plant.
- 28 February – 45th César Awards.
- 29 February – All indoor gatherings of more than 5,000 people are banned, over fears of the coronavirus.

=== March ===
- 15 and 22 March – Scheduled dates for the 2020 French municipal elections.
- 21 March – Independence of the XIVth district's Eco-Socialist Republic.

=== April ===
- 4 April – A terrorist knife attack in Romans-sur-Isère resulted in the death of two civilians and the wounding of five others. The perpetrator was arrested and charged with terrorist crimes.
- 13 April – President Emmanuel Macron makes a television address on coronavirus to the nation viewed by 36.7 million people.
- 21 April – The French state is ordered to pay €100,000 for "failing" the family of Isabelle Thomas, a woman who was murdered alongside her parents in 2014, by her abusive ex-partner.

=== June ===
- 11–17 June – 2020 Dijon riots: A 16-year-old Chechen in assaulted in Dijon, leading to several violent clashes, including in the Grésilles district.
- June – Louis Aliot became the first National Rally Mayor in Perpignan with a city of more than 100,000 people.

=== July ===
- 3 July – Prime Minister Édouard Philippe resigns, and is replaced by Jean Castex.

=== August ===
- 26 to 30 August – Scheduled date for the 2020 European Athletics Championships to be held in Paris.

=== September ===
- 25 September – 2020 Paris stabbing attack.

=== October ===
- 16 October – Murder of Samuel Paty.
- 29 October – 2020 Nice stabbing

=== November ===
- 29 November - Valentina wins the Junior Eurovision Song Contest 2020 with the song "J'imagine".

=== December ===
- 8 December – 8 December 2020 incident: the arrests of nine French citizens who joined the People's Defense Units by French authorities
- 15 December – Disappearance of Delphine Jubillar: a mother of two disappears during the night; her husband was arrested and charged with murder in 2021, going to trial in 2025.
- 16 December – Cécile Bourgeon and Berkane Makhlouf are sentenced to 20 years and 18 years of imprisonment respectively for the 2013 murder of Fiona Chafoulais.

== Deaths ==
=== January ===
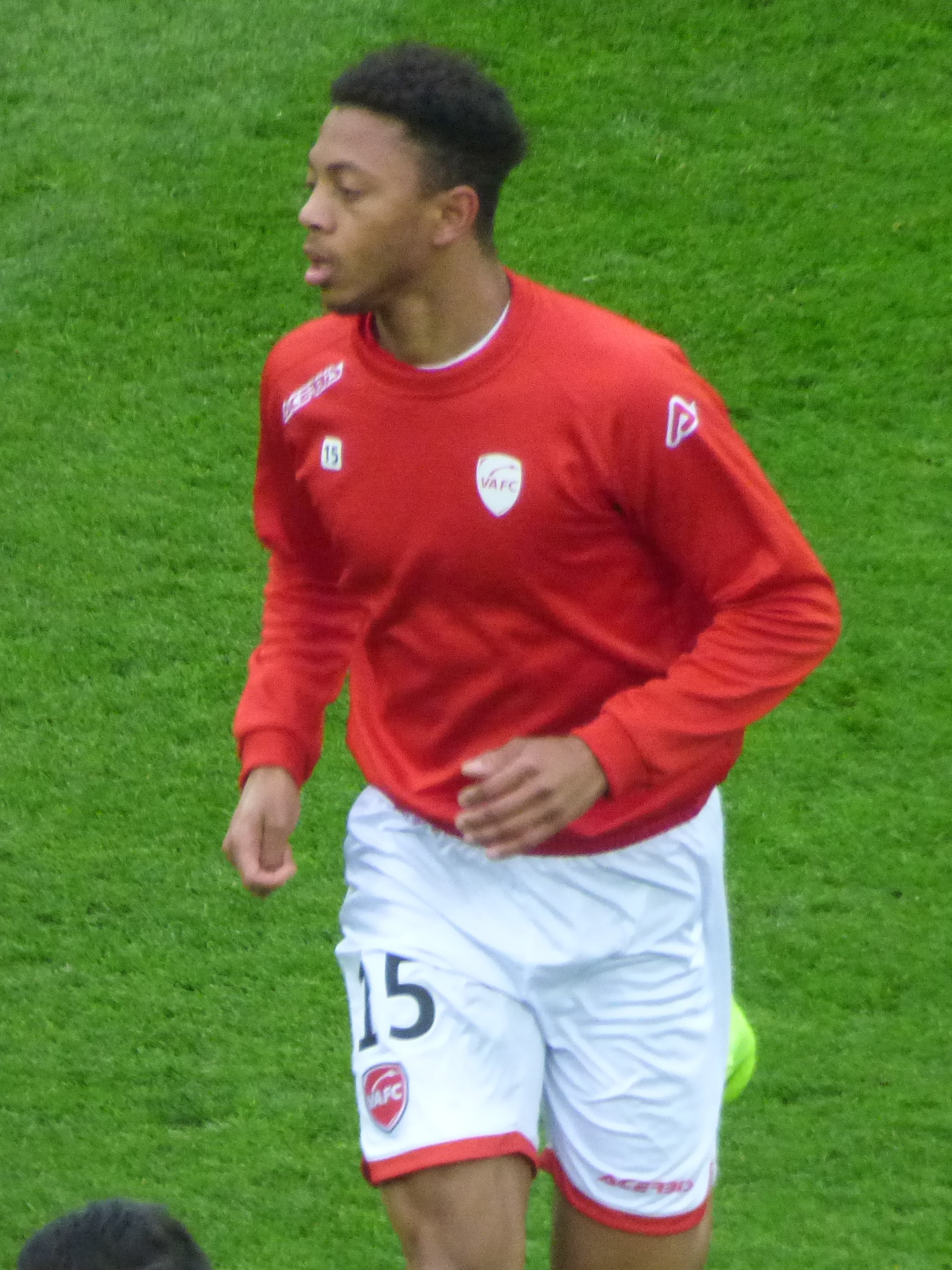
Nathaël Julan

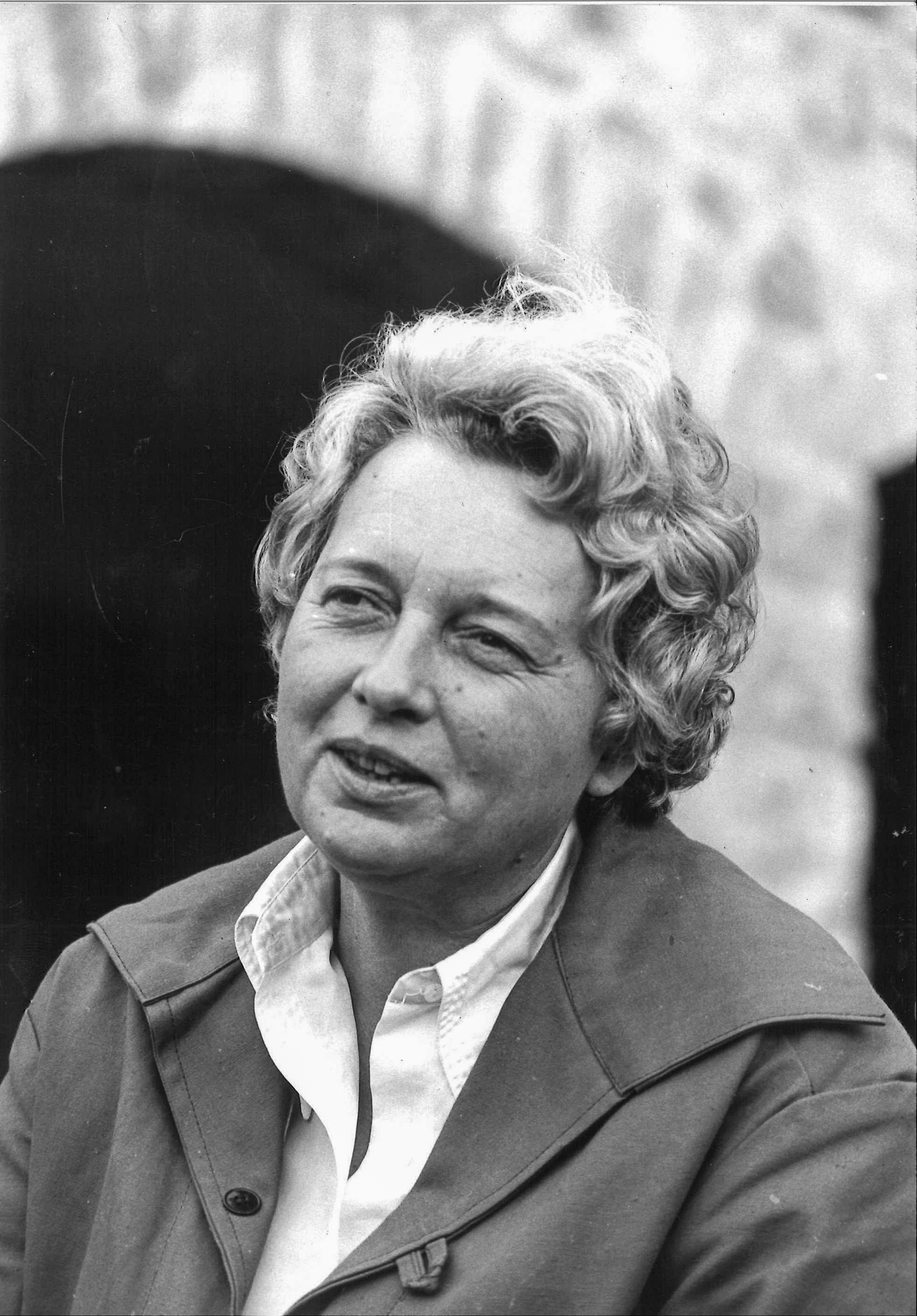
Marie-Thérèse Cheroutre

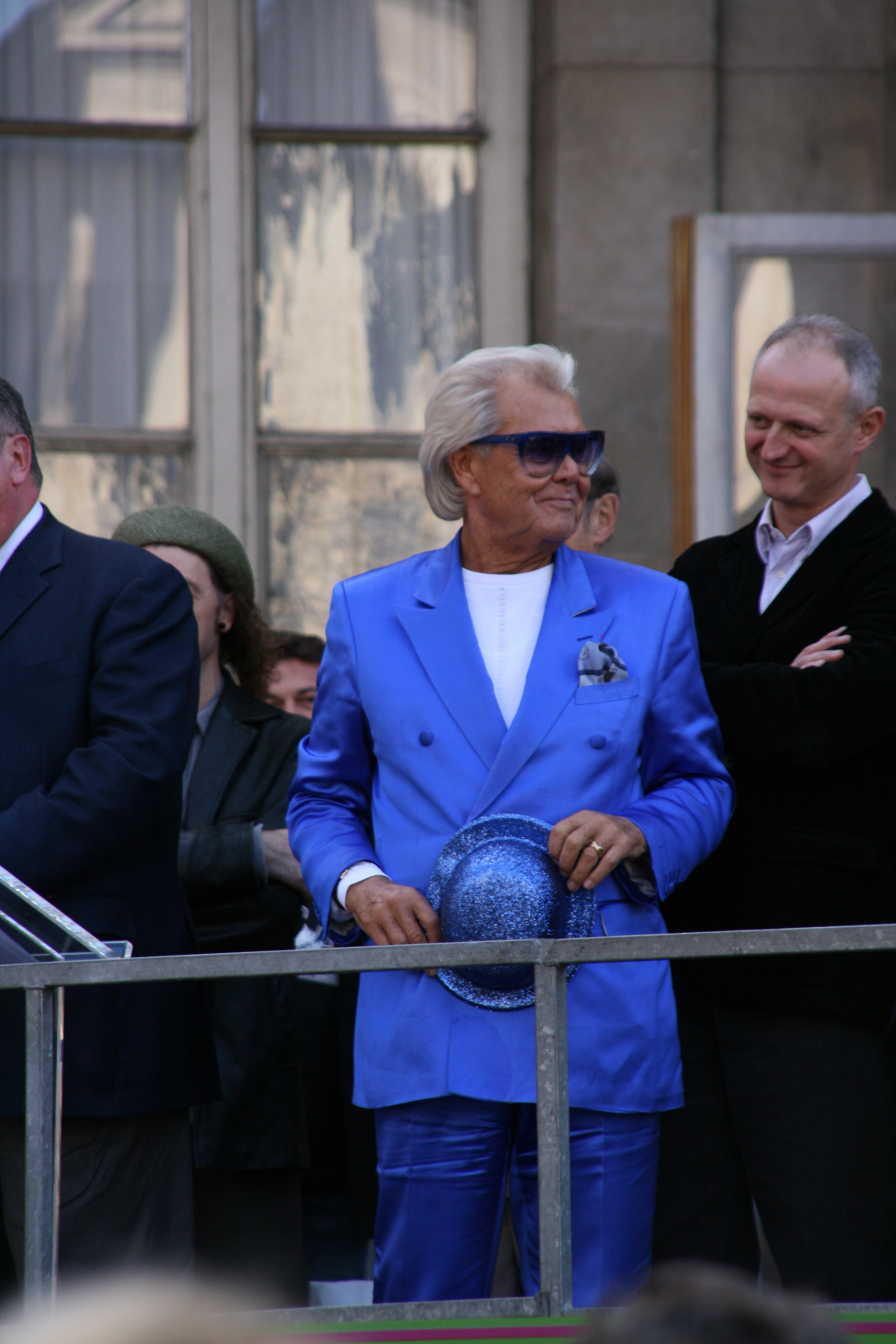
Michou

- 1 January
  - Marius Bruat, football player (b. 1930)
  - Michel Celaya, rugby union player (b. 1930)
- 2 January – Élisabeth Rappeneau, film director and screenwriter (b. 1940)
- 3 January – Nathaël Julan, football player (b. 1996)
- 4 January
  - Marie-Thérèse Cheroutre, historian and professor of philosophy (b. 1924)
  - Georges Duboeuf, wine merchant (b. 1933)
- 7 January
  - André Abadie, rugby union player (b. 1934)
  - Jacques Dessange, hairdresser (b. 1925)
  - Alexandre Matheron, philosopher (b. 1926)
- 9 January
  - Jacques de Bauffremont, 8th Duke of Bauffremont and 10th Prince of Marnay (b. 1922)
  - Robert Molimard, doctor and professor (b. 1927)
- 10 January
  - André Capron, immunologist and parasitologist (b. 1930)
  - Bernard Joly, politician (b. 1934)
- 11 January
  - Jean-René Farthouat, lawyer (b. 1934)
  - Alana Filippi, singer and songwriter (b. 1960)
  - Hilarion Vendégou, politician (b. 1941)
- 12 January – Marc Riolacci, football administrator (b. 1945)
- 13 January
  - Jean Delumeau, historian (b. 1923)
  - Pierre Lacoste, marine officer and government official (b. 1924)
  - Maurice Moucheraud, road racing cyclist (b. 1933)
- 14 January – Guy Deplus, clarinetist (b. 1924)
- 19 January – Guy Thomas, Belgian-born French songwriter (b. 1934)
- 20 January – Gilles Delouche, scholar of classical literature of the Rattanakosin Kingdom (b. 1948)
- 21 January – Sébastien Demorand, journalist and food critic (b. 1969)
- 25 January – Denis Rivière, painter (b. 1945)
- 26 January
  - Hubert Mingarelli, writer (b. 1956)
  - Michou, cabaret artist (b. 1931)
- 26 January
  - Émile Jung, chef (b. 1941)
  - Norbert Moutier, publisher and writer (b. 1941)
- 28 January – Théo Klein, lawyer (b. 1920)
- 29 January
  - Georges-Hilaire Dupont, prelate of the Roman Catholic Church (b. 1919)
  - Félix Marcilhac, art historian (b. 1941)
- 30 January – Roger Holeindre, politician (b. 1929)
- 31 January
  - Michel Billière, rugby union player (b. 1943)
  - Guy Delcourt, politician (b. 1947)
  - Delphine Forest, actress (b. 1966)

=== February ===
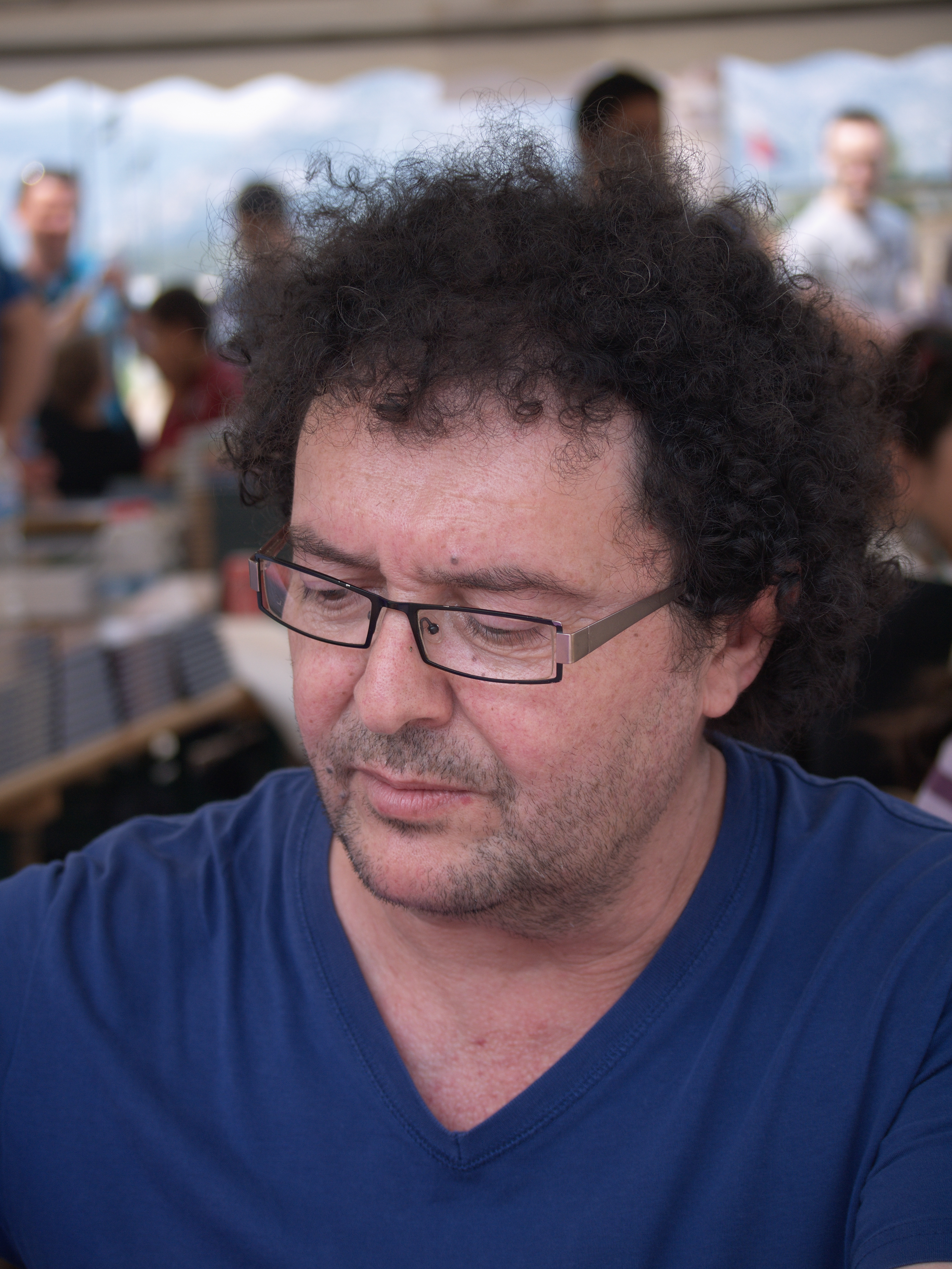
Philippe Adamov

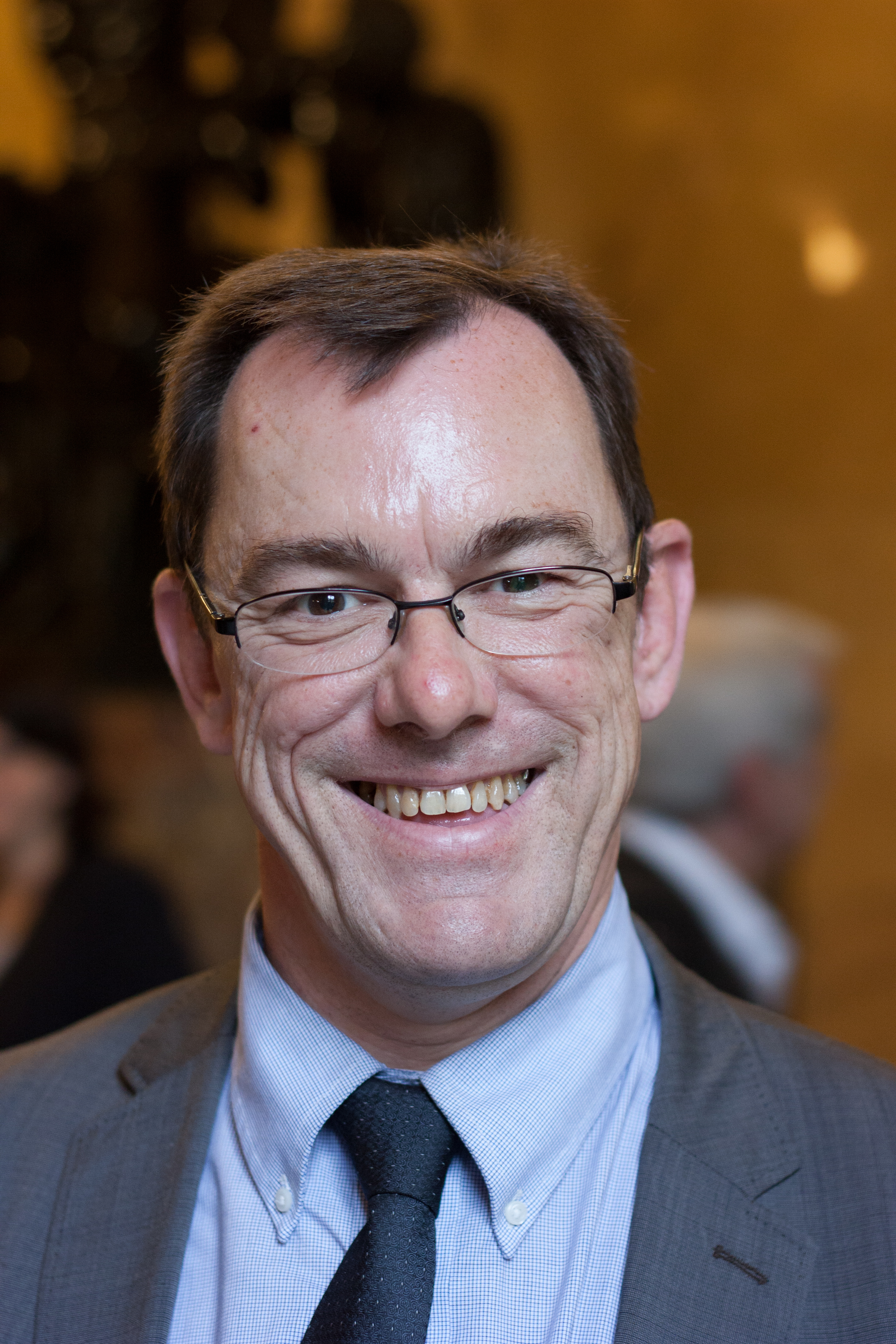
François André

- 2 February – Claire Clouzot, journalist (b. 1933)
- 3 February
  - Philippe Adamov, cartoonist (b. 1956)
  - David Kessler, senior official (b. 1959)
  - George Steiner, author (b. 1929)
- 4 February
  - Marie-Fanny Gournay, politician (b. 1926)
  - Zwy Milshtein, painter (b. 1934)
- 5 February – Yves Pouliquen, ophthalmologist (b. 1931)
- 6 February – Bruno Léchevin, trade unionist (b. 1952)
- 7 February – Pierre Guyotat, writer (b. 1940)
- 8 February
  - Maurice Girardot, basketball player (b. 1921)
  - Robert Massin, graphic designer (b. 1925)
- 10 February – Claire Bretécher, cartoonist (b. 1940)
- 11 February
  - François André, politician (b. 1967)
  - Jacques Mehler, cognitive psychologist (b. 1936)
- 12 February – Simone Créantor, athlete (b. 1948)
- 13 February
  - Christophe Desjardins, violist (b. 1962)
  - Hubert Boulard, comics writer and colorist (b. 1971)
- 14 February – Gilbert Belin, politician and sculptor (b. 1927)
- 16 February – Graeme Allwright, singer and songwriter (b. 1926)

=== March ===
- 21 March – Marguerite Aucouturier, Czech-born psychoanalyst (b. 1932)
- 26 March – Princess María Teresa of Bourbon-Parma, French-Spanish political activist and academic (b. 1933)
- 27 March – Jacques F. Acar, Senegal-born doctor (b. 1931)

=== April ===
- 1 April – Philippe Malaurie, lawyer (b. 1925)
- 2 April – Arnold Sowinski, football player (b. 1931)
- 19 April
  - Edmond Baraffe, football player and manager (b. 1942)
  - Philippe Nahon, actor (b. 1938)

=== May ===
- 13 May – Patrick Simon, politician (b. circa 1956)

=== June ===
- 1 June – Jean-Michel Cadiot, writer and journalist
- 2 June
  - Jean-Claude Hamel, football executive (b. 1939)
  - Jacques Noyer, Roman Catholic prelate (b. 1927)
  - Jean Pineau, politician (b. 1922)
  - Janine Reiss, vocal coach and harpsichordist. (b. 1921)
- 6 June
  - Jean-Marie Bourgeois, Olympic skier (b. 1939)
  - Alain Erlande-Brandenburg, art historian (b. 1937)
- 7 June – Paul Lombard, politician (b. 1937)
- 9 June – Jean-Philippe Reverdot, photographer (b. 1952)
- 11 June
  - Mahjoub Ben Bella, Algerian-born French painter (b. 1946)
  - Marcel Maréchal, actor and film director (b. 1937)
- 13 June
  - Maurice Rajsfus, writer and historian (b. 1928)
  - Jean Raspail, author (b. 1925)
  - Colo Tavernier O'Hagan, British-French screenwriter (b. 1942)
  - Marc Zermati, record producer and promoter (b. 1945)
- 14 June
  - Luce Douady, climber (b. 2003)
  - Claude Samuel, music critic and radio executive (b. 1931)
- 15 June – Michel Roquebert, historian and writer (b. 1928)
- 16 June
  - Roger Borniche, author and police detective (b. 1919)
  - Patrick Poivey, actor and voiceover artist (b. 1948)
- 17 June – Fabrice Philipot, racing cyclist (b. 1965)
- 18 June – Nicolas Joel, opera director (b. 1953)
- 19 June – Noël Vandernotte, Olympic rowing coxswain (b. 1923)
- 21 June
  - Pascal Clément, politician (b. 1945)
  - Joan Pau Verdier, singer (b. 1947)
- 24 June
  - Jacques Demêtre, blues historian (b. 1924)
  - Marc Fumaroli, historian and essayist (b. 1932)
  - Claude Le Péron, bass guitarist (b. 1948)
- 25 June
  - Patrice Gélard, politician, Senator (b. 1938)
  - Olivier Le Fèvre, astrophysicist (b. 1960)
- 26 June – Abdoulatifou Aly, Malagasy-born Mahoran politician (b. 1960)

=== July ===
- 25 July – Olivia de Havilland, Japanese-born British-American film actress (b. 1916)
- 28 July – Gisèle Halimi, Tunisian and French lawyer, feminist, and essayist (b. 1927)
- 30 July - Djemel Barek French-Algerian actor (b.1963)

=== August ===
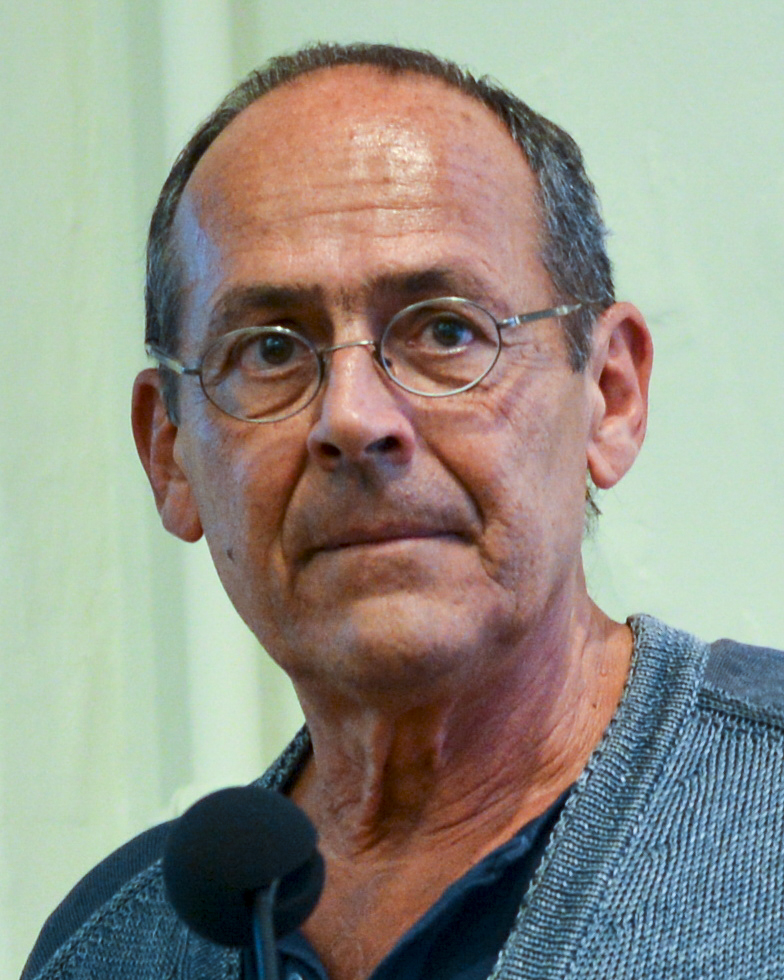
Bernard Stiegler

- 1 August – Alex Dupont, footballer (b. 1954)
- 5 August
  - Claudine Cassereau, model and pageant winner, (b. 1953)
  - Philippe Mongin, economist (b. 1950)
  - Pierre Robin, aeroplane designer (b. 1927)
  - Frédéric Jacques Temple, poet and writer (b. 1921)
- 6 August
  - Boris Bobrinskoy, Eastern Orthodox theologian (b. 1925)
  - Louis Meznarie, automotive engineer (b. 1930)
  - Paul Schaffer, Holocaust survivor (b. 1924)
  - Bernard Stiegler, philosopher (b. 1952)
  - Pierre Viot, executive (b. 1925)

=== December ===
- 2 December – Valéry Giscard d'Estaing, President of France (b. 1926 in Germany)

== See also ==
=== Country overviews ===
- History of France
- History of modern France
- Outline of France
- Government of France
- Politics of France
- Years in France
- Timeline of France history
- List of French films of 2020
