= Au Crocodile =

Coordinates: 48.583702°N 7.747483°E

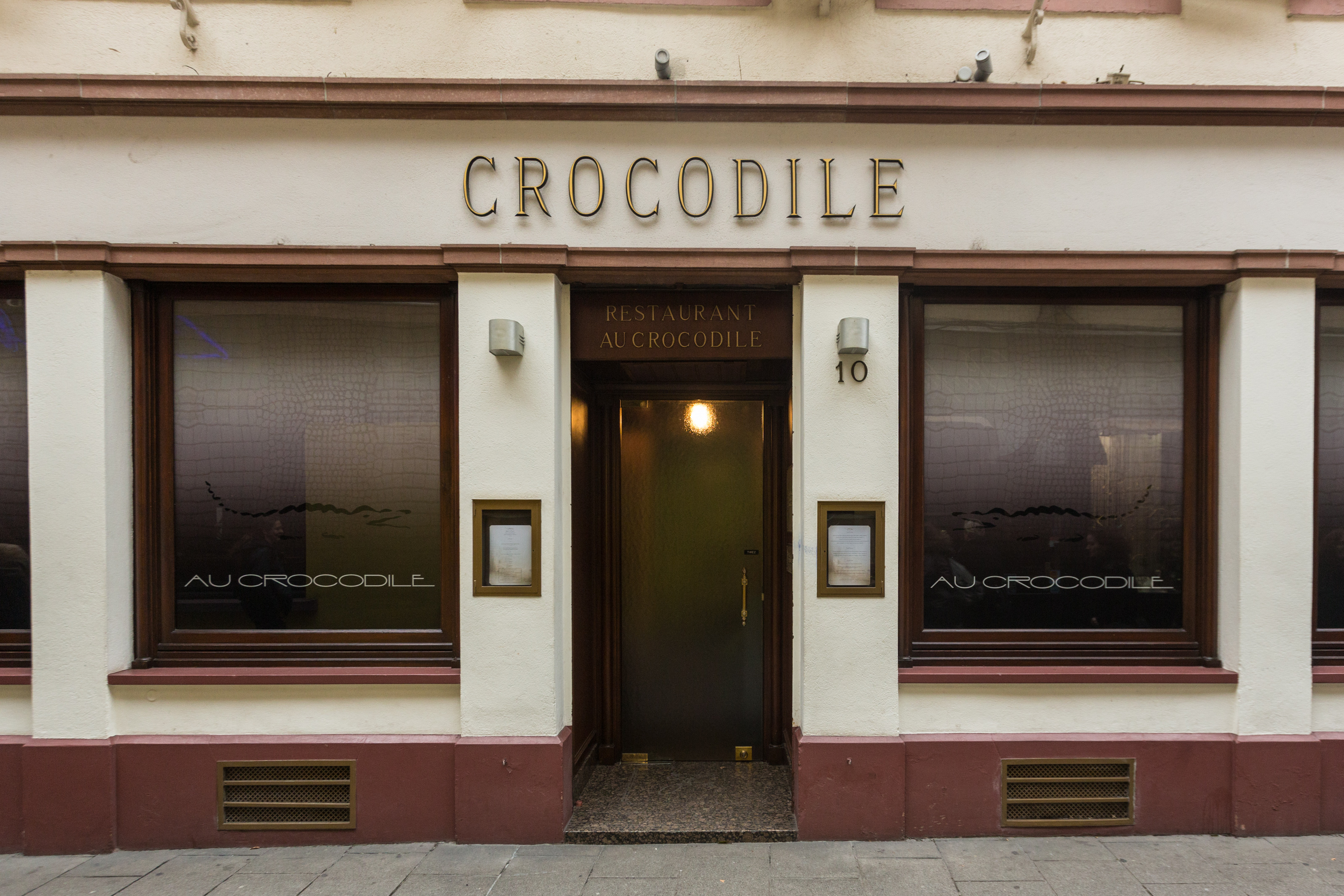
- Interactive map of Au Crocodile

Restaurant information
- Established: 1971
- Owner: Cedric Moulot
- Chef: Franck Pelux
- Food type: Classic French
- Location: 10 r. de l'Outre F - 67000, Strasbourg, Alsace, France
- Reservations: Recommended
- Website: www.au-crocodile.com

Au Crocodile is a restaurant in Strasbourg, France, serving French cuisine, holding a Michelin star in 2023.

== History ==
The restaurant was named after a stuffed crocodile that a local general brought back from overseas whilst on Napoleon Bonaparte's campaign in Egypt and Syria, and which is hung over the foyer. In 1921, the prominent French gastronomic journalist Curnonsky (nicknamed the "Prince of Gastronomy") wrote about Au Crocodile, and the stuffed crocodile in the foyer.

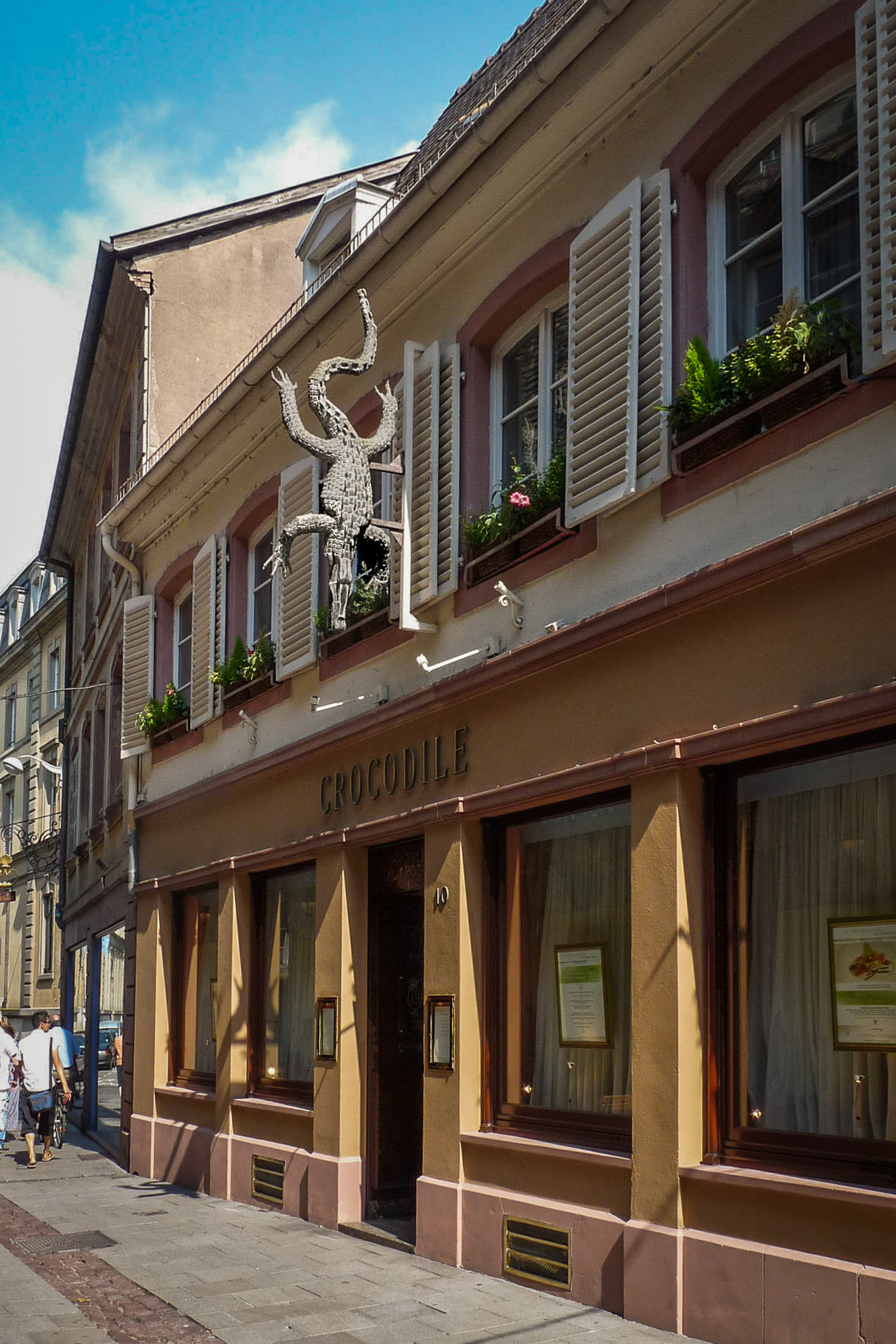
Restaurant Crocodile

Émile Jung and his wife Monique took over the restaurant in 1971 and, in 1989, it was awarded three Michelin stars. In 2002, it lost one of them. Jung said, "No words can ease the pain that eats at our hearts and that has killed our spirits". Some of Jung's colleagues took out a full-page advertisement to show their support. In 2023 the restaurant held one star.

The restaurant has been used as a site for discussing international relations: in May 2010 the Prime Minister of Albania Sali Berisha and his opposition leader Edi Rama were summoned to a meeting there by two leading members of the European Parliament. Chef Philippe Bohrer purchased the restaurant in 2010 from Jung for more than a million euros. Cedric Moulot became owner in 2015, with Franck Pelux as chef.

Le Crocodile in Vancouver, British Columbia, Canada, was named after Au Crocodile, after chef Michel Jacob visited the French restaurant as a young man.

== Reception ==
Travel guide Fodor's described the dishes of chef Bohrer as "dazzling", and thought that the interior was "aglow". The review in travel guide Frommer's also thought favourably of the interior of the restaurant, and described the dishes as "inventive", saying their "major problem comes only when the bill ... arrives".

In 2018 Au Crocodile topped TripAdvisor's list of the World's best restaurants. In 2023 the restaurant held one Michelin star.
