= 8 December 2020 case =

Arrest of French YPG volunteers

The 8 December 2020 case (French: Affaire du 8 décembre 2020) refers to the arrests of nine citizens by French authorities in December 2020, one of whom had previously joined the Kurdish People's Defense Units (YPG). Florian D., who returned to France in 2018 after volunteering to fight with the Kurdish forces against the Islamic State, was designated as a far-left extremist by the General Directorate for Internal Security along with eight of his associates. Together, they were arrested in a series of raids on 8 December 2020.

Seven of the nine were criminally charged with associations with terrorism. The case is the first far-left terrorist case to be brought to court in France since the trial of Action Directe in 1995, and has been marked by controversies over mistreatment of the accused in detention and about the strength of the evidence.

This case received publicity for the treatment of Florian D., known by the pseudonym "Libre Flot", who was placed in solitary confinement for 16 months while under pre-trial detention. The Administrative Court of Versailles would later rule that the decision to place him in solitary confinement was improper and ordered the state to pay 3000€ in compensation.

== Background ==
Rojava is an autonomous region in north-eastern Syria practicing a form of libertarian socialism known as democratic confederalism. Rojava has been involved in regional conflicts, including its war against the Islamic State and other Islamist factions, since its inception.

Several dozen French citizens have travelled to Syria since 2015 to join the Rojavan People's Defense Units (YPG) in the fight against the Islamic State.

Florian D., one of the key people in the case, was born in April 1984 in the French commune of Blois. He travelled to Syrian Kurdistan to fight alongside the YPG in April 2017, staying until January 2018. Notably, Florian D. participated in the Battle of Raqqa, serving as a sniper and pyrotechnician. In September 2019, French intelligence had placed a number of YPG volunteers under surveillance upon their return to France, including Florian D.

At the beginning of 2020, the General Directorate for Internal Security (French: Direction générale de la Sécurité intérieure, or DGSI) issued a report on the potential threat of Florian D. and certain people he was associated with to the national public prosecutor's department for antiterrorism (French: parquet national antiterroriste, or PNAT), which opened a preliminary investigation on February 7, 2020. The report noted the DGSI's suspicion that they sought to organize a "violent" and "clandestine" group to "commit guerrilla and violent actions against institutional targets". The report cited one Camille B. (Florian D.'s girlfriend), Simon G., Manuel H, William D., Loïc M. and Bastien A.. The six people cited in the report knew Florian D. personally, however, they did not all know each other. The summary of the official report prepared for the preliminary investigation in April 2020 acknowledged that at the current stage there was no group and "no project to take violent action."

The report issued by the DGSI revealed the existence of wiretaps which may have been placed illegally. These wiretaps are the subject of an appeal before the National Commission on the Control of Investigative Techniques, however, their legality has not impacted the 8 December case.

On April 20, 2020, PNAT opened an investigation against Florian D. That same day, a judge formally authorized the DGSI's usage of wiretaps. The wiretaps ultimately did not reveal anything, except that Florian D. intended to leave the country. On November 19, 2020, the DGSI, PNAT and investigative judge Jean-Marc Herbaut decided to arrest 11 people for questioning.

== Case ==
=== Involved people ===
The case involved nine French citizens who had volunteered with the YPG. Police considered the leader of the nine to be Florian D., also known by the pseudonym Libre Flot, a former volunteer French teacher in the Calais Jungle before leaving to Rojava in 2017 to volunteer with the YPG. Simon G. was a former pyrotechnician at Disneyland. Loïc M., William D. et Bastien A. had previously met Florian D. at the Zone to Defend at the Sivens Dam project. Camille B., originally from Brittany, was the only woman among the accused.

=== Arrests ===
On 8 December 2020, at six in the morning, the General Directorate for Internal Security (Direction générale de la Sécurité intérieure, or DGSI) and the RAID conducted raids to arrest nine French citizens who had returned from Rojava, in Syria, in 2018. Those nine had all travelled to Rojava to join the YPG to assist in the fight against the Islamic State. National Centre for Counter Terrorism head Laurent Nuñez claimed that the arrests demonstrated that there was an increased risk of far-left extremism in France.

=== Legal proceedings ===
After being detained for three days, two of the arrested were subsequently released, whereas the other seven (six men and one woman, all in their early 30s) were charged with criminal association with intent to commit terrorist acts. A police source claimed to newspaper Sud Ouest that the arrested were "trying to purchase weapons, were training, and preparing explosives," and that they had vague undefined plans to target "the police or the military."

After a few months, however, only Florian D., was still under detention. He was conditionally released for health reasons in April 2022.

In October 2023, the trial of the seven accused began at the 16th court of the Tribunal judiciaire de Paris.

== Mistreatment in custody ==
Florian D. was placed in solitary confinement in the Centre pénitentiaire de Bois-D'Arcy pending his trial on the 11th of December, 2020, remaining there for 16 months until April 2022. in France, Solitary confinement is typically reserved for detainees who have demonstrated that they pose an immediate danger to others, although it is also frequently used for detainees who have been implicated in acts of terrorism. This was the longest a group of seven indictees had been placed in pre-trial detention, despite penitentiary officials having described their behavior as "exceptional" during their detainment.

In late February 2022, Florian D. began a hunger strike in protest against the poor conditions and the solitary confinement of his detention. In his letter, he stated that it had been "more than 14 months that I’ve been buried alive in a hellish and permanent solitude without having anyone to talk to" and that the director of detentions of the prison he was being held in had told him that his "placement and my maintenance in solitary confinement were decided from the first day by very high ranking people and that whatever I say or [the director of detentions] says or does, nothing will be done about it."

His health started to deteriorate following the hunger strike, after which he was transferred to the Centre pénitentiaire de Fresnes. On the 31st of March, 2022, a person close to Florian D announced that he lost 15 kilograms of weight since the start of his hunger strike and could no longer get out of bed. On the 4th of April, he finished his hunger strike, and by the 7th of April, he was released from prison with an electronic bracelet and transferred to a hospital in Villejuif.

On April 17, 2023, the Administrative Court of Versailles recognized the irregular character of the two decisions to prolong the solitary confinement of Florian D. and ordered the state to pay him about 3000€ in compensation. According to the judges, the evidence presented in his case was insufficient to demonstrate he would have posed a serious, immediate risk had he received an ordinary detention.

During four months of detention, the only woman among the accused underwent nineteen full-body strip searches and claimed to have been threatened with sexual assault. On 8 March 2023, she was issued 200€ compensation after a French court found two of the strip searches illegal.

== Criticism ==
The charges brought against the seven have been controversial, and have been compared to the Tarnac Nine.

Monde diplomatique journalist Philippe Baqué has stated that none of the objects claimed by the police to be material for explosives seized during the arrests were particularly uncommon or unusual to be owned, and that, as of April 2021, the police have yet to release clear evidence of intent to commit terrorist acts. One of the arrested wrote in Lundi Matin that, contrary to police claims, they had not been an organised group and their detentions were the first time some of them had met. Harrison Stetler and Rona Lorimer of The Nation stated that the accused "had no identifiable plan whatsoever to commit acts of violence" and that the trial was "about dusting off France’s anti-terrorism statutes to target activists on the left," comparing it to the French government's forced dissolution of environmentalist group Les Soulèvements de la Terre in 2023, in which the group was targeted with anti-terrorist police raids.

Isabelle Sommier of Paris 1 Panthéon-Sorbonne University stated that arrests seemed politically motivated, "to demonstrate that the state is doing something" against recent demonstrations that had broken out in violence.

French digital rights NGO La Quadrature du Net cited this case as an example for the attempt to outlaw the use of encryption.
