= Marie-Thérèse Cheroutre =

French historian (1924–2020)

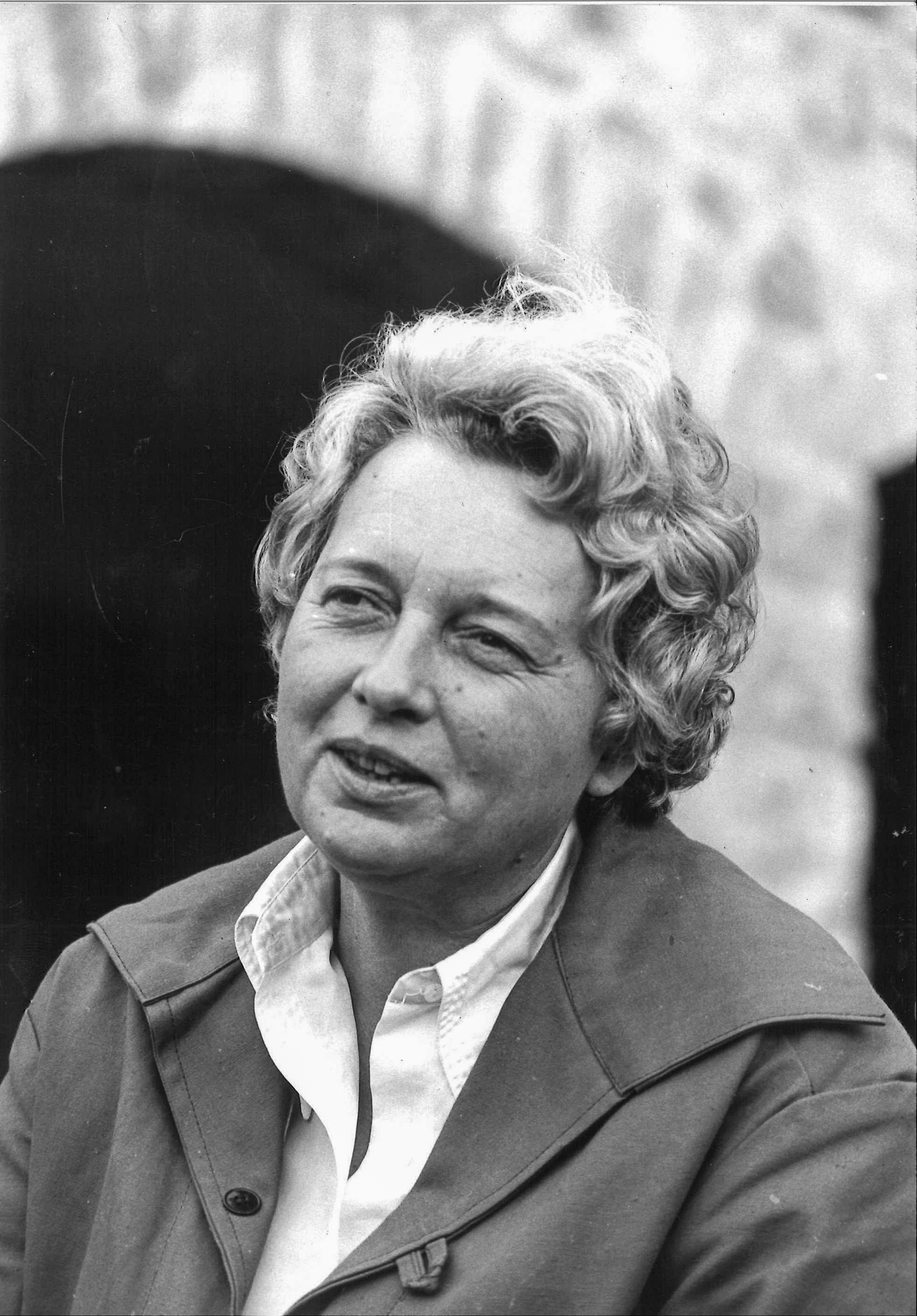
- Marie-Thérèse Cheroutre (1976)
- Born: 17 May 1924; Sète, France
- Died: 4 January 2020 (aged 95); Sète, France
- Occupations: Historian; Professor

Marie-Thérèse Cheroutre (17 May 1924 – 4 January 2020) was a French historian and professor of philosophy. She served as general commissioner of Guides de France from 1953 to 1979.

== Biography ==
Cheroutre was born in 1924. She discovered Scouting just before World War II.

After she obtained a degree in philosophy, Cheroutre briefly worked as a teacher. She then moved to Paris became general commissioner of the Guides de France, summoned by Olave Baden-Powell, where she served from 1953 to 1979.

In 1968, Cheroutre founded the National Council of Youth and Popular Education Associations (CNAJEP).

On 21 October 1978, she published an article in Le Monde titled Éducation et mixité, which encouraged more girls to join Scouting.

Cheroutre served as President of the National Council for Community Life (CNVA) from 1983 to 1993, and she became a member of the French Economic, Social and Environmental Council in 1984.

Cheroutre obtained a doctorate degree in contemporary history in 2000 at University of Paris 1 Pantheon-Sorbonne.

Marie-Thérèse Cheroutre died on 4 January 2020 in Sète at the age of 95. She is set to be buried at Cimetière Marin, Sète on 8 January.

== Publications ==
- L’essor et l’avenir du bénévolat, facteur d’amélioration de la qualité de la vie, Paris, Direction des journaux officiels (1989)
- Exercice et développement de la vie associative dans le cadre de la loi du 1er juillet 1901 (1993)
- Le scoutisme : quel type d'hommes et quel type de femmes ? : quel type de chrétiens ? (1994)
- Le scoutisme au féminin : histoire des Guides de France de 1923 à 1998 (2002)
