= Jacques Dessange =

French hairdresser (1925–2020)

Jacques Dessange (5 December 1925 – 7 January 2020) was a French hairdresser.

== Early life ==
Jacques Dessange was born in 1925 in Souesmes, France as the son of René Dessange, a hairdresser, and his wife Aline, who opened a café next to the hairdresser. Jacques first worked in the hairdressing salon of his father, and in 1947 went to work in Trouville-sur-Mer in the salon of Louis Gervais.

== Career ==
He soon started working for fashion shows and other events, like the 1948 Carven show. In 1954 he opened his first hairdressing salon, in Paris, and in 1956 married Corinne de Boissière, agent to Brigitte Bardot, who became his client. He worked with many French stars like Françoise Hardy, Jeanne Moreau, France Gall and Sylvie Vartan and invented some popular hairstyles like the coiffé-décoiffé, a loose, "tousled" hairstyle. In 1961, he became the official hairdresser of the Cannes Film Festival, which introduced him to international stars like Claudia Cardinale, Marlene Dietrich, Jane Fonda, Ava Gardner, Jean Seberg and Liz Taylor. He continued to work for Paris fashion shows as well, e.g. in 1964 for Guy Laroche.

He created some of the most celebrated coiffures of Brigitte Bardot, including the Beehive so-called "choucroute" (French for Sauerkraut) chignon, and turned her into a blonde for And God Created Woman.

In 1958 he opened his first salon outside of France in Tunis, Tunisia. The company he created, Dessange International, was at the time of his death present in 43 countries with more than 1,700 salons operating under different brands, including "Jacques Dessange" and "Camille Albane". It also sold hairstyle products. Dessange also opened institutes to train new hairdressers: by 2003 108 of these existed.

== Later life ==
He stopped working as a hairdresser in 1977, retired in 2004 and sold his company in 2008.

Dessange died in 2020, leaving two sons, Cyril (born in 1961) and Benjamin (1967).
