= Jean-Michel Cadiot =

French politician and journalist (1952–2020)

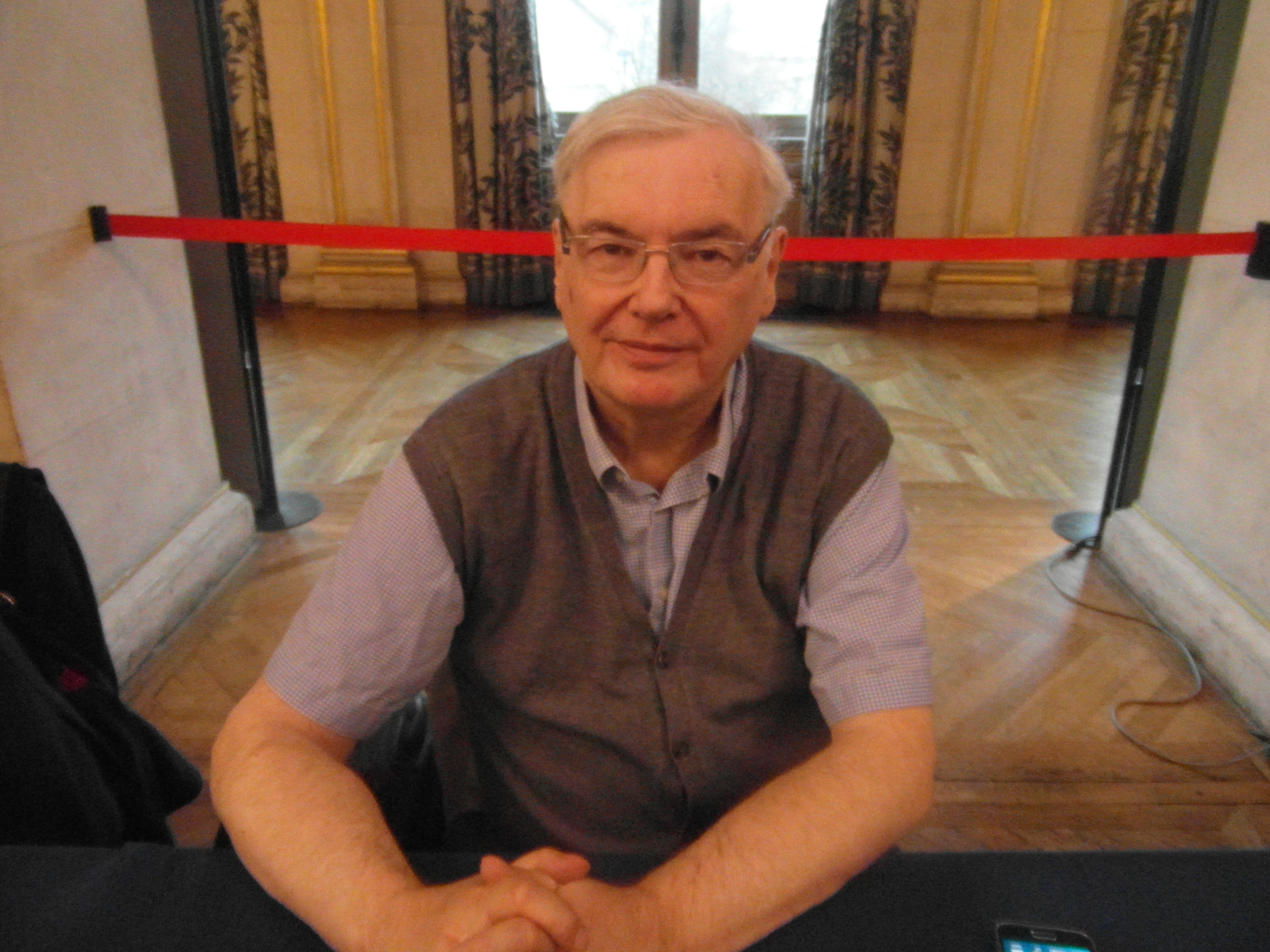
- Cadiot in 2016
- Born: 23 December 1952; Neuilly-sur-Seine, France
- Died: 1 June 2020 (aged 67); Massy, France
- Occupations: Writer; Journalist

Jean-Michel Cadiot (23 December 1952 – 1 June 2020) was a French writer and journalist.

== Biography ==
Jean-Michel was the son of Robert Cadiot (1909–1967), a polytechnician, and Odile Gay (born 1919), a Greek and Latin professor.

Cadiot held a license in Chinese from Paris Diderot University. He also took courses in economics and theology. He began working for Témoignage chrétien and the magazine France-Pays arabes. In 1979, he became a correspondent with the Agence France-Presse (AFP) in Baghdad. He joined the AFP in Paris in 1981 and worked in Rennes, Brest, Tehran, and Bucharest. He was Vice-President of the Association for Mutual Aid to Eastern Minorities.

In the 2007 French legislative election, Cadiot ran for Deputy under the UDF-MoDem ticket in Val-d'Oise's 8th constituency. However, he only obtained 3.32% of the votes in the first round. In 2008, he ran in the Canton of Sarcelles-Nord-Est, earning 3.48% of the vote.

Jean-Michel Cadiot died on 1 June 2020 at the age of 67.

== Bibliography ==
- Quand l'Irak entra en guerre (1989)
- Mitterrand et les communistes (1995)
- L'Almanach politique et religieux (1999)
- Francisque Gay et les démocrates d'inspiration chrétienne (2006)
- Les Chrétiens d'Orient. Vitalité, souffrance, avenir (2010)
- Saâd Abssi, le combat pour la dignité (2014)
- Noun, chrétiens de Mossoul persécutés (2014)
- Pierre Santini, le but c'est le chemin (2015)
