= Zwy Milshtein =

French painter (1934–2020)

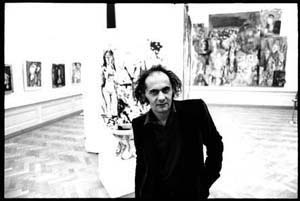
- Born: 25 June 1934; Chișinău, Kingdom of Romania
- Died: 4 February 2020 (aged 85); Paris, France
- Occupation: Painter

Zwy Milshtein (25 June 1934 – 4 February 2020) was a Romanian-born French painter.

== Biography ==
Milshtein was born in Romania in 1934, but fled Europe prior to the Nazi invasion in World War II. He studied at a Pioneers Palace in Tbilisi from 1943 to 1944, and then moved to Bucharest with the painter George Ștefănescu in 1946. He left for Israel the following year and briefly studied sculpture in Cyprus with Asaf Ben Zvi. In 1952, he participated in the Likrat Review with Nathan Zach and David Avidan in order to represent poetry in Hebrew.

In 1956, Milshtein received a scholarship from the Norman Foundation, which allowed him to study in Paris. In 1965, he published MICROCOSME, his first artistic book. In 1966, he received the Prix de la critique for his engravings. In 1967, Milshtein wrote DOSSIER SOLANGE, his first literary work. In 1986, he became interested in Digigraphie.

In 1991, Roland Topor invited Milshtein to participate in his last Panic Movement exhibition. In 2007, Milshtein moved to Gleizé, in the Rhône Department of France

Milshtein died on 4 February 2020 at the age of 85.
