= Christophe Desjardins =

French musician (1962–2020)

- Born: 24 April 1962; Caen, France
- Died: 13 February 2020 (aged 57)
- Occupation: Violist
- Formerly of: Ensemble InterContemporain

Christophe Desjardins (24 April 1962 – 13 February 2020) was a French violist and specialist in contemporary music.

== Biography ==
Born in Caen, Christophe Desjardins entered the Conservatoire de Paris in 1982, at the age of 20, in Serge Collot's class. He also studied at the Hochschule der Künste in Berlin. In 1990, he was solo violist at the Théâtre de la Monnaie in Brussels. He joined the Ensemble InterContemporain in Paris in 1990.

Desjardins premiered works for viola by Ivan Fedele, Luciano Berio, Pierre Boulez, Michael Jarrell, Michaël Levinas, Emmanuel Nunes, Jonathan Harvey, Wolfgang Rihm and Gianvincenzo Cresta. In addition to numerous world premieres, Desjardins taught at several universities, including the Juilliard School in New York. From 2010 to 2013, he taught at the Hochschule für Musik Detmold.

== Discography ==
- Voix d'alto, works by Luciano Berio and Morton Feldman, Paris, AEON, 2004.
- Emmanuel Nunes, La main noire, AEON, 2007.
