= Félix Marcilhac =

French art historian (1941–2020)

- Born: 20 November 1941
- Died: 29 January 2020 (aged 78)
- Occupation: Historian

Félix Marcilhac (20 November 1941 – 29 January 2020) was a French art historian who collected Art Deco objects.

In 1969, Marcilhac opened the galerie Marcilhac in Paris, specializing in Art Deco. He was the author of the biography of French orientalist painter Jacques Majorelle. He sold his entire collection in March 2014, earning 24,727,715 €. The gallery was then taken over by his son, Félix-Félix Marcilhac.

Félix Marcilhac died on 29 January 2020 at the age of 78.

== Publications ==
- Jean Dunand (1991)
- Sandoz, Sculpteur, figuriste et animalier (1996)
- Chana Orloff 1888-1968, catalogue raisonné (1996)
- André Groult, Décorateur-ensemblier du XXe siècle (1996)
- Pierre-Paul Jouve (2005)
- Angkor - Le Cambodge d'André Maire (2005)
- Joseph Csaky, Du cubisme à la figuration réaliste (2007)
- Dominique, André Domin et Marcel Genevrière, décorateurs d'avant-garde, Dominique, éditions de L'Amateur (2008)
- Gustave Miklos and Joseph Csaky (2010)
- René Lalique, catalogue raisonné de l'oeuvre de verre (2011)
- Maurice Marinot, artisan verrier 1882-1960 (2013)
- Les orientalistes : Jacques Majorelle (2016)
- Jacques Majorelle (2017)
