= Émile Jung =

French chef (1941–2020)

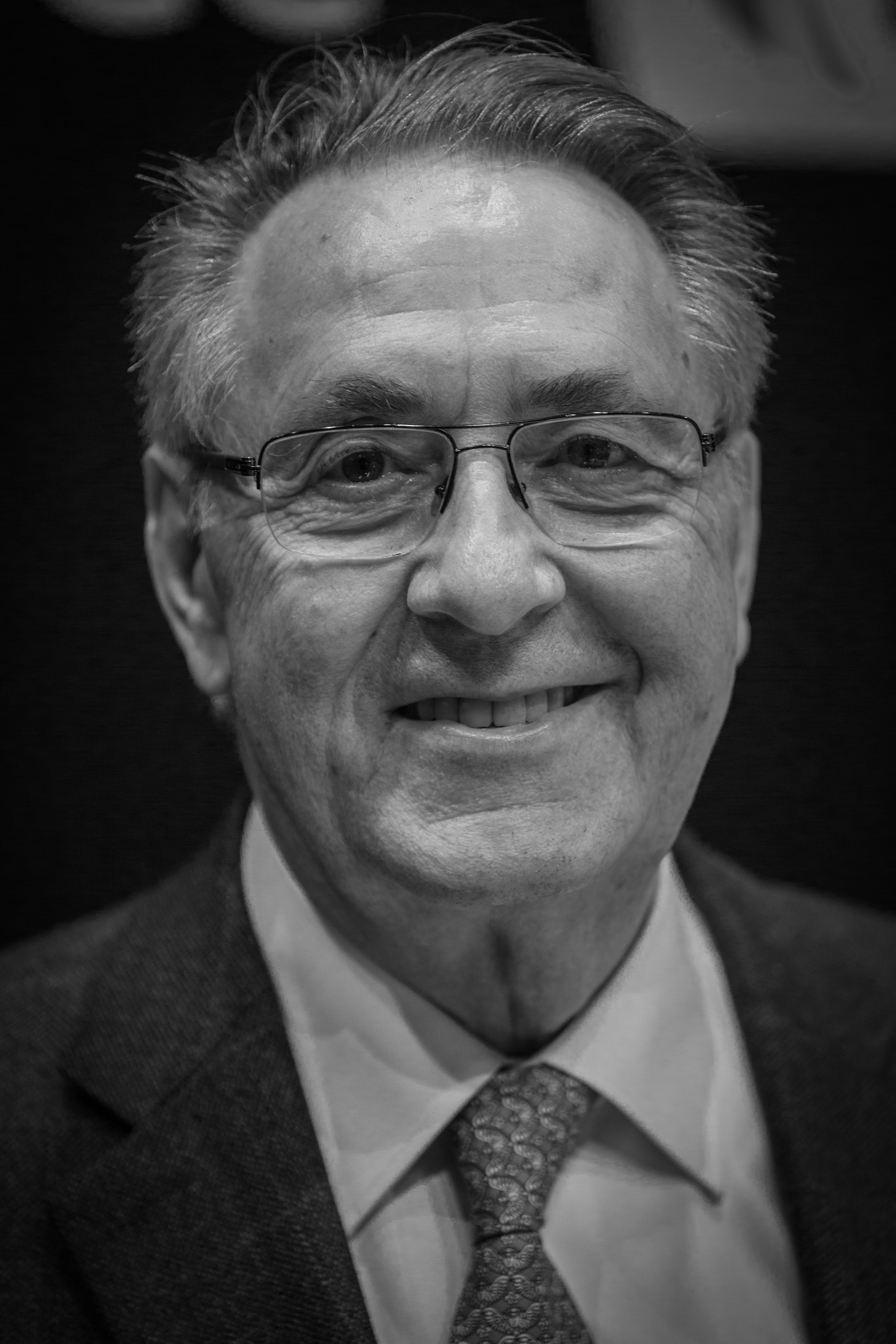
- Jung in 2014
- Born: 2 April 1941; Masevaux, France
- Died: 27 January 2020 (aged 78); Strasbourg, France
- Occupation: Chef

Émile Jung (2 April 1941 – 27 January 2020) was a French chef, who achieved three stars in the Michelin Guide for his restaurant Au Crocodile.

== Biography ==
Although he was born in Masevaux, Jung spent his childhood in Lyon. It was in Lyon where he met Paul Bocuse, who taught him the richness of Lyonnaise cuisine. He began culinary school in Paris, and he frequently visited the city's most renowned establishments, such as Fouquet's and la Marée. He also trained at La Maison Rouge in Strasbourg and La Mère Guy in Lyon. He returned to Alsace in 1965 and became head chef at L’Hostellerie alsacienne in Masevaux. He earned his first Michelin Guide star the following year.

Jung and his wife, Monique, moved to Strasbourg in 1971 and took over the restaurant Au Crocodile, the restaurant was named after a stuffed crocodile that a local general brought back from overseas whilst on Napoleon Bonaparte's campaign in Egypt and Syria. The couple quickly established themselves in Alsatian cuisine and obtained three stars in 1989, which they would keep until 2002.

Jung retired in 2009. He sold the restaurant to Philippe Bohrer.

Émile Jung died on 27 January 2020 at the age of 78.

== Publications ==
- Au menu de ma vie (2001)
- À la table du Crocodile (2001)
