= Bernard Joly =

French politician (1934–2020)

Senator from Haute-Saône
- In office 24 September 1995 – 30 September 2004

Personal details
- Born: 26 October 1934 Troyes, France
- Died: 10 January 2020 (aged 85) Nice, France

Bernard Joly (26 October 1934 – 10 January 2020) was a French politician who served as Senator.

== Biography ==
Elected Senator in 1995, Joly was a member of the European Democratic and Social Rally group. He did not seek reelection in 2004.
