= Bruno Léchevin =

French trade unionist (1952–2020)

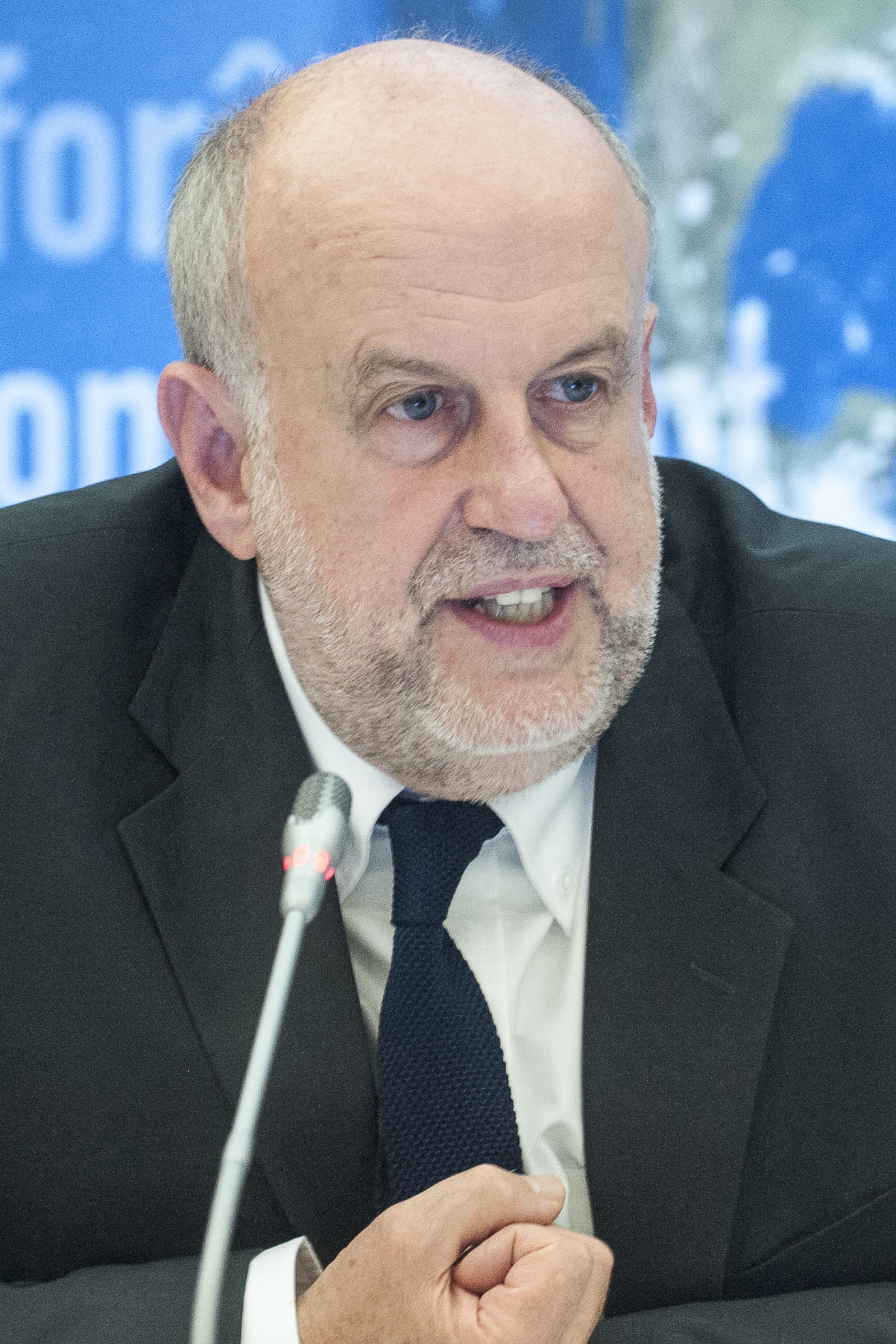
- Léchevin in 2016
- Born: 27 January 1952; Sallaumines, France
- Died: 6 February 2020 (aged 68)
- Occupation: Trade unionist

Bruno Léchevin (27 January 1952 – 6 February 2020) was a French trade unionist. He was President of the French Environment and Energy Management Agency from 2013 to 2018.

== Biography ==
Léchevin was born in 1952 in Sallaumines, a former mining town in Pas-de-Calais. After his schooling, Léchevin became a certified carpenter. He joined the Young Christian Workers in 1967, and participated in the May 68 events. He served as President of the Young Christian Workers from 1974 to 1978.

Léchevin began his career at Électricité de France in 1979 as a storekeeper in Lyon. At the same time, he was taking courses at the Catholic University of Lyon. In 1980, he became a permanent member of the French Democratic Confederation of Labour. He became a federal secretary for the confederation and participated in the protests for the 35-hour workweek. He left his position in 1999.

In 1986, Léchevin founded Électriciens sans frontières. In 2000, he became a member of the Commission de régulation de l'énergie. He was appointed as a general delegate at the Médiateur national de l'énergie. In March 2013, he became chairman of the board of directors of the French Environment & Energy Management Agency. He also joined the board of directors of Électricité de France in May of that same year. In 2019, Léchevin became head of the Finance Climate Pact, a European climate bank founded by Jean Jouzel and Pierre Larrouturou.

Léchevin died on 6 February 2020 at the age of 68.

== Decorations ==
- Officer of the Legion of Honour (2013) (Knight in 2002)
- Knight of the Ordre national du Mérite (1998)
