= Jean-René Farthouat =

French lawyer (1934–2020)

Premier Secretary of the Conférence des avocats du barreau de Paris
- In office 1 January 1961 – 31 December 1962

President of the Confédération nationale des avocats
- In office January 1980 – December 1981

President of the École de formation professionnelle des barreaux de la cour d'appel de Paris
- In office 1994–1995

Bâtonnier of the Paris Bar Association
- In office 1 January 1994 – 31 December 1995
- Preceded by: Georges Flécheux
- Succeeded by: Bernard Vatier

President of the Conseil national des barreaux
- In office 1 January 2000 – 31 December 2002
- Preceded by: Philippe Leleu
- Succeeded by: Michel Bénichou

Personal details
- Born: 26 June 1934 Neuilly-sur-Seine, France
- Died: 11 January 2020 (aged 85)
- Occupation: Lawyer

Jean-René Farthouat (26 June 1934 – 11 January 2020) was a French lawyer who served as Bâtonnier of the Paris Bar Association from 1994 to 1995.

== Decorations ==
- Commander of the Legion of Honour
