= Boris Bobrinskoy =

French Orthodox priest and theologian (1925–2020)

- Born: 25 February 1925; Paris, France
- Died: 6 August 2020 (aged 95); Bussy-en-Othe, France
- Occupation: Theologian

Boris Bobrinskoy (Russian: Борис Алексеевич Бобринский; 25 February 1925 – 6 August 2020) was a French theologian and protopresbyter of the Eastern Orthodox Church.

Bobrinskoy was honorary dean of the St. Sergius Orthodox Theological Institute in Paris, Rector of the Alexander Nevsky Cathedral, a mitrophore, and archpriest of the exarch of the Ecumenical Patriarchate of Constantinople.

From 1954 to 2006, Bobrinskoy was chair of dogmatic theology at the St. Sergius Orthodox Theological Institute. He was a member of the Faith and Order Commission of the World Council of Churches. He was trained in Orthodox theology as well as Catholic and Protestant theology.

The theologians who influenced Bobrinskoy include Georges Florovsky, Nicholas Afanasiev, Alexander Schmemann, and Vladimir Lossky. At the start of the 1970s, he chaired the radio association La Voix de l'orthodoxie.

Bobrinskoy was awarded an honorary doctorate of the University of Fribourg and Saint Vladimir's Orthodox Theological Seminary. He was also a knight of the Order of the Holy Sepulchre.

Bobrinskoy was married to Hélène Disterlo (Елена Юрьевна, урож. Дистерло), with whom he had three children and multiple grandchildren. He died in Bussy-en-Othe on 6 August 2020 at the age of 95.

== Publications ==
- Communion du Saint-Esprit (Abbaye de Bellefontaine, 1992)
- Le Mystère de la Trinité (1996)
  - The Mystery of the Trinity (St. Vladimir's Seminary Press, 1999) ISBN 9780881418590
- La Compassion du Père (2000)
  - The Compassion of the Father (St. Vladimir's Seminary Press, 2003) ISBN 9780881412512
- La Vie liturgique (Paris: Cerf, 2000) ISBN 9782204065290
- Le Mystère de l'Église (2003)
  - The Mystery of the Church: A Course in Orthodox Dogmatic Theology (St. Vladimir's Seminary Press, 2012) ISBN 9780881413885
- Je suis venu jeter le Feu sur la terre (Paris: Cerf, 2003) ISBN 9782914857062
- Le Dieu manifesté: Homélies sur la Nativité et le Baptême du Christ de 1985 à 1999 (2016)
- Réjouis-toi! Croix Vivifiante: Homélies sur la Croix de 1979 à 1999 (2017)
- Viens, Esprit de vérité! (2024) ISBN 9782204160544
