= Robert Molimard =

French doctor (1927–2020)

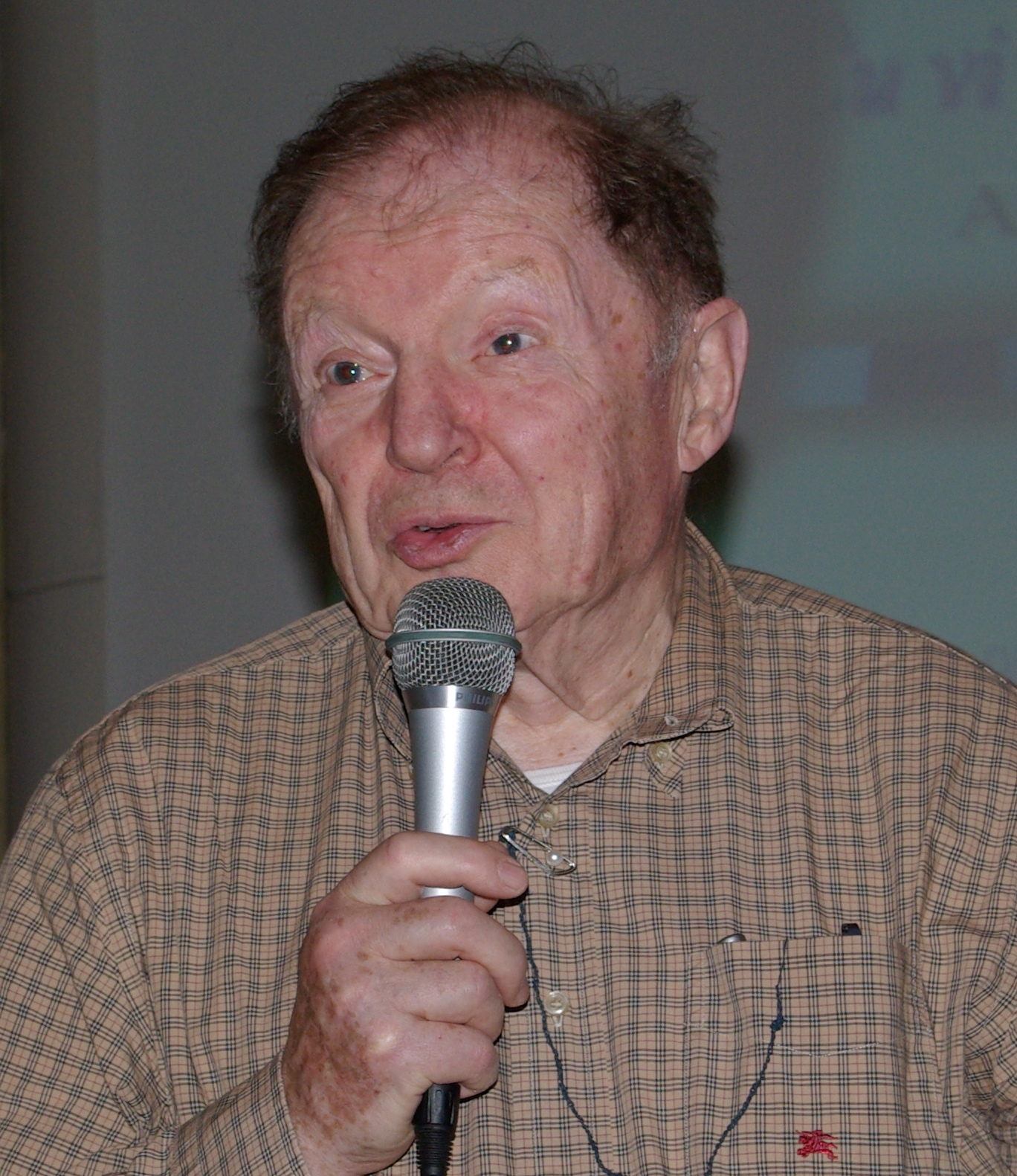
- Molimard in 2007
- Born: 16 December 1927; Cournon-d'Auvergne, France
- Died: 9 January 2020 (aged 92)
- Occupations: Doctor; Professor

Robert Molimard (16 December 1927 – 9 January 2020) was a French doctor and professor at Paris-Sud University. He was a pioneer in tobacco research in France. He was however criticized for hiding some of his links with the tobacco industry.

== Publications ==
- Tabac : comprendre la dépendance pour agir
- La fume : Smoking (2003)
- Petit manuel de Défume : se reconstruire sans tabac, Éditions De Borée (2003)
- L’Homme, avatar de Dieu (2016)
