= Marc Riolacci =

Football administrator (died 2020)

- Died: 12 January 2020 (aged 74)
- Occupation: Football administrator

Marc Riolacci (died 12 January 2020) was a French football administrator, who served as President of the Ligue corse de football and was on the council of the French Football Federation.
