= Robert Massin =

French graphic designer (1925–2020)

Massin (13 October 1925 – 8 February 2020), born Robert Massin, was a French graphic designer, art director, and typographer, renowned for his innovative experimentation with expressive forms of typographic composition. He stopped using his first name in the 1950s.

== Biography ==
Massin was born in 1925 in Bourdinière-Saint-Loup, a commune in the Eure-et-Loir department in north-central France. He began working as a designer after World War II. Massin's primary influence in the 1950s was the innovative French book designer Pierre Faucheux. Faucheux emphasized that each new book should be a unique object, shaped by type choice, proportion, and déroulement — the development of a visual concept over several pages. Faucheux also advocated that the choice of typeface should relate to the meaning of the text. These ideas strongly influenced much of Massin's most notable work.

For over twenty years, Massin served as the art director of Éditions Gallimard, one of France's leading book publishers. An early significant project at Gallimard was his 1963 design for Raymond Queneau's Exercices de style, a book that retells the same story 99 times, each in a different graphic style. Another landmark work was his 1964 graphic interpretation of Eugène Ionesco's play La Cantatrice chauve (translated as The Bald Prima Donna or The Bald Soprano). This work is a major example of expressive typography, spanning hundreds of pages of innovative graphic compositions that visually represent the dialogue of the play. Massin employed a variety of typefaces and compositional techniques, even stretching and bending the text to convey the dialogue's emotion and rhythm.

In addition to his extensive visual work, Massin authored several books, including La Lettre et l'Image (Letter and Image). Writing in Eye magazine, Jan Middendorp praised La Cantatrice chauve and La Lettre et l'Image for their significant impact, noting: "These two masterpieces of typographic eccentricity became hot items among designers and art directors on both sides of the Atlantic, and were especially influential in America, where they helped trigger the post-functionalist approach of graphic design that eventually culminated in the eclecticism of the late 1980s and 1990s."

A major 2007 monograph on his work, Massin, written by Laetitia Wolff and published by Phaidon, was the first English-language monograph dedicated to him. Massin died in Paris on 8 February 2020.

== Work ==
Notable books designed by Massin:

- Exercices de style by Raymond Queneau, Gallimard, 1963.
- La Cantatrice chauve by Eugène Ionesco, Gallimard, 1964.
- Délire à deux by Eugène Ionesco, Gallimard, 1966.
- Conversation-sinfonietta by Jean Tardieu, Gallimard, 1966.
- Les Mariés de la tour Eiffel by Jean Cocteau, Hoëbeke, begun in 1966 and published in 1994.

Notable books written by Massin:

- La Lettre et l'Image, Gallimard, 1970.
