= Philippe Adamov =

French cartoonist (1956–2020)

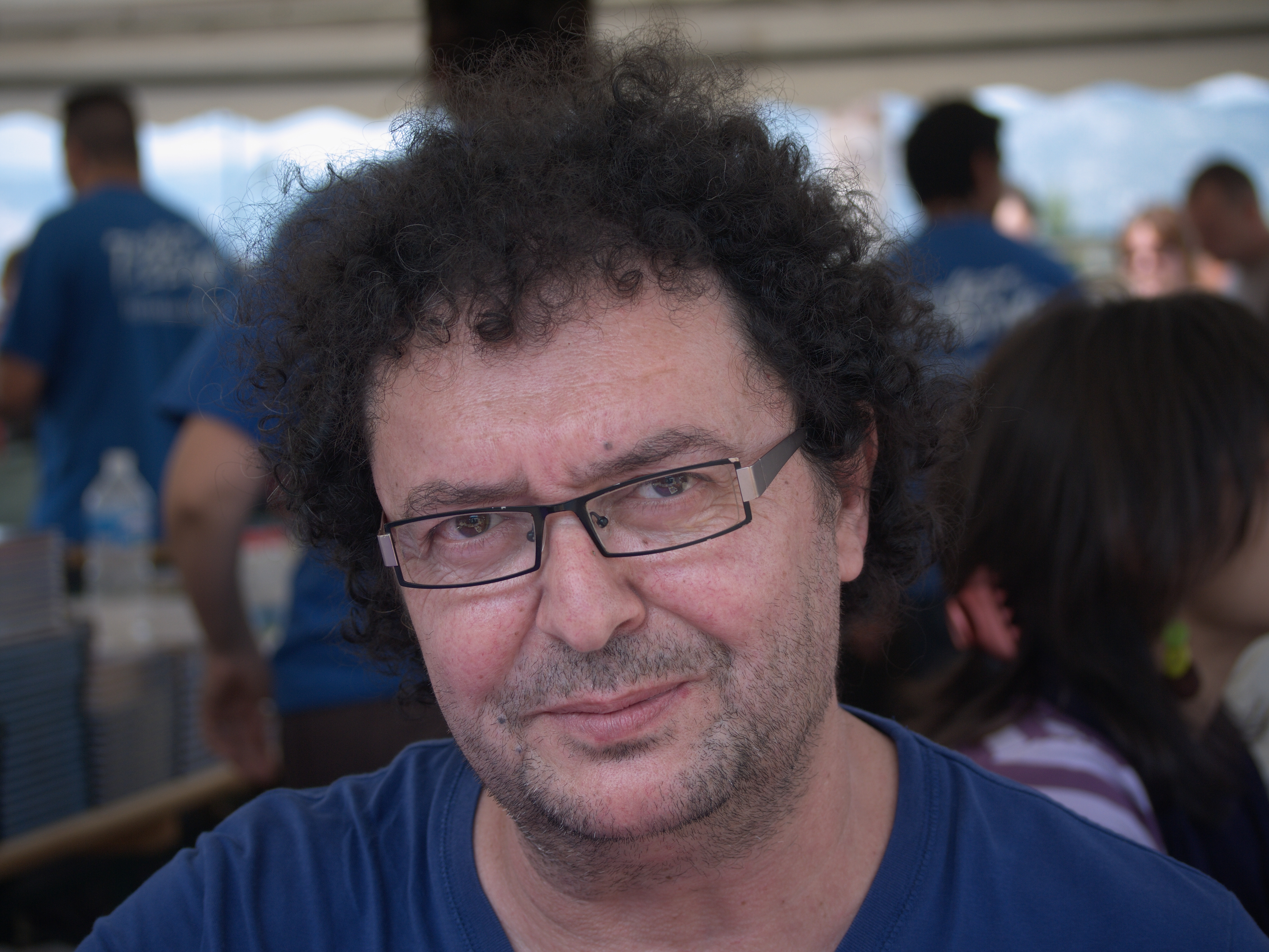
- Born: 27 June 1956; London, England
- Died: 3 February 2020 (aged 63); Nimes, France
- Occupation: Cartoonist

Philippe Adamov (27 June 1956 – 3 February 2020) was a French cartoonist.

== Biography ==
Adamov took up cartooning upon his discovery of the works of Harold Foster and Jijé. After a few months at École Estienne, he worked as a decorator at René Laloux Studios. In 1978, he began drawing, starting with covers of television series Ulysses 31. He began publishing comics in the magazine Okapi in 1983.

The journalist Henri Filippini noticed Adamov's talent and brought him to Glénat Editions. He was then a professional cartoonist. Some of his works from this time include Dayak and L'Impératrice rouge. In 2004, he moved to Éditions Albin Michel and collaborated with novelist Jean-Christophe Grangé to write La Malédiction de Zener.

Philippe Adamov died on 3 February 2020 at the age of 63.

== Publications ==
- Le Vent des dieux (1985–1991)
- Les Eaux de Mortelune (1986–2000)
- Dayak (1993–1997)
- L'Impératrice rouge (1999–2003)
- La Malédiction de Zener (2004–2009)
- Dakota (2012–2016)
