= Patrice Gélard =

French politician (1938–2020)

Member of the French Senate for Seine-Maritime
- In office 1 October 1995 – 30 September 2014

Mayor of Sainte-Adresse
- In office 14 March 2008 – 4 April 2014
- Preceded by: Jacques Dubois
- Succeeded by: Hubert Dejean de la Batie

Personal details
- Born: 3 August 1938 Toulon, France
- Died: 25 June 2020 (aged 81) Sainte-Adresse, France
- Party: UMP
- Education: Paris Law Faculty; Inalco

Patrice Gélard (3 August 1938 – 25 June 2020) was a French politician who served as a member of the Senate of France. He represented the Seine-Maritime constituency and was a member of the Union for a Popular Movement (UMP) Party.

Gélard died on 25 June 2020 at the age of 81.

== Biography ==
Patrice Gélard studied law and political science at the University of Paris Faculty of Law(agrégé in public law, doctorate in political science in 1962) and Russian and modern Greek at the National Institute of Oriental Languages and Civilizations (graduated in 1960).

An academic by profession (professor at the Le Havre Normandy University and the University of Rouen), he is a specialist in the USSR and Yakutia. He chairs the France-Russia friendship group and maintains ties with Vladimir Putin's administration.

He was elected senator for Seine-Maritime on September 24, 1995, and re-elected on September 26, 2004. He was a general councilor for Seine-Maritime from 1985 to 1992, a municipal councilor and then deputy mayor of Le Havre from 1983 to 2008, and vice-president of the Le Havre urban community from 2002 to 2014. Patrice Gélard headed the UMP list in the municipal elections in Sainte-Adresse (Seine-Maritime) on March 9 and 16, 2008. He was ultimately elected mayor of the municipality in the first round with 2,204 votes (66.01% of the vote).

He was president of the COCOE (Commission for the Organization and Control of Electoral Operations) during the 2012 UMP internal election, which announced the results of the vote between the two candidates for party president without including the results from three overseas territories (New Caledonia, Mayotte,Wallis and Futuna).

He left politics in 2014. He died on June 25, 2020.

Édouard Philippe, who had just been re-elected mayor of Le Havre on July 5, 2020, paid him a heartfelt tribute.
