= Denis Rivière =

French painter (1945–2020)

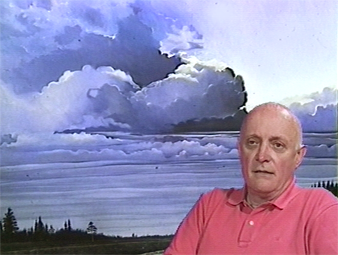
- Denis Rivière in 1995
- Born: 1945; Honfleur, France
- Died: 25 January 2020 (aged 75)
- Occupation: Painter

Denis Rivière (1945 – 25 January 2020) was a French painter.

== Biography ==
Rivière had a great interest in classical art. A trip to Egypt helped inspire him to trace images in a certain manner. He was passionate about developing subtleties in the skies.

His paintings were acquired by several national museums and art centers such as the FRAC Centre and the Élysée Palace.

Denis Rivière died on 25 January 2020.

== Expositions ==
- Espace Electra, Paris, 2000
- Galerie van Remmen, Solingen, 2000
- Kunsthanlung Kugel, Duisburg, 2000
- Art-gallery, Wiesbaden, 2000
- Bibliothèque de l’Université du Littoral Côte d’Opale, Dunkirk, 2000
- “ciel aux quotidiens” galerie Lefor Openo, Paris, 2002
- Galerie Samedi, Montfort-l'Amaury, 2002
- Salles Saint Pierre -La Fabrique, Avallon, 2003
- L’Arsenal-Musée, Soissons, 2003
- La Galerie Jaune, Le Mans, 2004
- Maison Jean de La Fontaine, Château-Thierry, 2005
- Galerie Samedi, Montford-l'Amaury, 2005
- 366 ciels, Quimperlé, 2005
- salle St. Jacques Saint-Quentin, Saint-Quentin, 2006
- Galerie Duchoze, Rouen, 2006
- Espace APcis, Maisons-Alfort, 2006
- Galerie F.G.Conzen, Düsseldorf, 2008
- Panorama Museum, Bad Frankenhausen, 2008
- Musée de Soissons, Soissons, 2008
- Galerie D. Duchoze, Rouen, 2008
- Galerie Jamault, Paris, 2008
- Galerie F.G. Conzen, Düsseldorf, 2008
- Galerie Pallade, Lyon, 2009
- Galerie Patrice Peltier, Le Mans, 2009
- Galerie Danièle Bourdette, Honfleur, 2010
- APACC, Montreuil, 2011
- Maison des Arts et Loisirs, Laon, 2012
- Galerie Detai, Paris, 2013
- Galerie Anne-Marie et Roland Pallade, Lyon, 2014
- Galerie Patrice Peltier, Paris, 2014
