= Mahjoub Ben Bella =

Algerian-born French painter and designer (1946–2020)

- Born: 22 October 1946; Maghnia, French Algeria
- Died: 11 June 2020 (aged 73); Tourcoing, France
- Occupation: Artist

Mahjoub Ben Bella (20 October 1946 – 11 June 2020) was an Algerian-born French painter and designer. He is well known for his murals and cobblestone designs for Paris–Roubaix.

== Biography ==
After his education at the École des Beaux-Arts d'Oran, Ben Bella moved to France at the age of 19, in the Nord Department. He then continued his studies at the École des Beaux-Arts de Tourcoing, the École nationale supérieure des arts décoratifs, and the École nationale supérieure des Beaux-Arts. He began his career teaching at the École des Beaux-Arts de Cambrai.

In 1975, Ben Bella returned to Tourcoing and set up his permanent workshop, where he would spend the remainder of his career. His paintings were largely abstract and often used Arabic calligraphy. In 1986, he painted L'Envers du Nord using the roadway for Paris–Roubaix. The total length of road used for this painting was 12 kilometers.

In 2000, he painted 1800 ceramic tiles for the station Colbert on the Lille Metro in Tourcoing.

Mahjoub Ben Bella died on 11 June 2020 in Tourcoing at the age of 73 following a long illness.
