= Deaths in February 2020 =

The following is a list of notable deaths in February 2020.

Entries for each day are listed alphabetically by surname. A typical entry lists information in the following sequence:

- Name, age, country of citizenship at birth, subsequent country of citizenship (if applicable), reason for notability, cause of death (if known), and reference.

== February 2020 ==
=== 1 ===
- Viktor Afanasyev, 72, Russian military musician, Senior Director of the Military Band Service of the Armed Forces of Russia (1993–2002).
- Péter Andorai, 71, Hungarian actor (My Father's Happy Years, Bizalom, My 20th Century).
- Danny Ayres, 33, British speedway rider, suicide.
- Ilie Bărbulescu, 62, Romanian footballer (Argeș Pitești, Steaua, national team), heart attack.
- George Blondheim, 63, Canadian pianist and composer.
- Leons Briedis, 70, Latvian poet and author.
- John A. DiBiaggio, 87, American academic administrator, President of the University of Connecticut (1970–1985), Michigan State University (1985–1992) and Tufts University (1992–2001).
- Ronald Duman, 65, American psychiatrist.
- Lila Garrett, 94, American television writer (Bewitched, Baby, I'm Back).
- Luciano Gaucci, 81, Italian football executive, President of Perugia (1991–2004).
- Andy Gill, 64, English post-punk guitarist (Gang of Four) and record producer.
- Clarence "Jeep" Jones, 86, American community activist.
- Jaswant Singh Kanwal, 100, Indian novelist.
- Roger Landry, 86, Canadian businessman and publisher (La Presse).
- Lev Mayorov, 50, Russian-Azerbaijani football player and manager (Kuban Barannikovsky, Chernomorets Novorossiysk, national team).
- Denford McDonald, 90, New Zealand businessman.
- Anthony N. Michel, 84, American electrical engineer.
- Luciano Ricceri, 79, Italian production designer (A Special Day, Captain Fracassa's Journey).
- Admiral K. Sangma, Indian politician, MLA (1993–2003), heart disease.
- Peter Serkin, 72, American classical pianist, Grammy winner (1966), pancreatic cancer.
- Howard E. Smither, 94, American musicologist.
- Charles Wood, 87, British screenwriter (The Knack ...and How to Get It, Help!, Iris).

=== 2 ===
- Peter Aluma, 46, Nigerian basketball player (Liberty Flames, Sacramento Kings).
- Senaka Angulugaha, 60, Sri Lankan cricketer (Sri Lanka Air Force Sports Club).
- Claire Clouzot, 86, French film director and critic.
- Johnny Lee Davenport, 69, American actor (The Fugitive, Joy, Work in Progress), leukemia.
- John W. Drake, 87, American microbiologist and geneticist.
- Bernard Ebbers, 78, Canadian communications executive and convicted fraudster, CEO of WorldCom (1985–2002).
- Roger Fieldhouse, 79, British historian and academic.
- Sir Victor Glover, 87, Mauritian chief judge.
- Mad Mike Hoare, 100, British mercenary leader (Congo Crisis, Operation Angela).
- Harold H. Izard, 80, American politician, New York State Assemblyman (1975–1976).
- Kofi B, Ghanaian highlife musician, heart attack.
- Ivan Král, 71, Czech-American musician and songwriter ("Ask the Angels", "Pumping (My Heart)", "Dancing Barefoot").
- David Lacy-Scott, 99, English cricketer (Cambridge University, Kent).
- Enemésio Ângelo Lazzaris, 71, Brazilian Roman Catholic prelate, bishop of Balsas (since 2008).
- Philip Leder, 85, American geneticist.
- Mike Moore, 71, New Zealand politician, Prime Minister (1990), Director-General of the World Trade Organization (1999–2002), Ambassador to the United States (2010–2015).
- Ryszard Olszewski, 87, Polish Olympic basketball player (1960) and coach, and politician.
- Lovelady Powell, 89, American actress (I Never Sang for My Father, The Possession of Joel Delaney, The Happy Hooker).
- Kommareddy Surender Reddy, Indian politician, MLA (1985–1989).
- M. Narayana Reddy, 88, Indian politician, MP (1967–1971), MLA (1972–1978).
- Harry Rubin, 93, American cell biologist and virologist.
- Gale Schisler, 86, American politician, member of the U.S. (1965–1967) and Illinois (1969–1981) Houses of Representatives.
- Robert Sheldon, Baron Sheldon, 96, British politician, MP (1964–2001) and member of the House of Lords (2001–2015), heart attack.
- Rabi Singh, 89, Indian Odia poet.
- Terry Spencer, 88, English cricketer.
- Salahuddin Wahid, 77, Indonesian politician and Islamic scholar, member of the People's Consultative Assembly (1998–1999), complications from heart surgery.
- Valentin Yanin, 90, Russian historian.

=== 3 ===
- Philippe Adamov, 63, French cartoonist.
- Robert Alner, 76, British racehorse trainer.
- Deborah Batts, 72, American jurist, Judge of the U.S. District Court for Southern New York (since 1994).
- Carol Bedö, 89, Romanian Olympic gymnast.
- John Bevan, 76, British diver.
- John Edward Brockelbank, 88, Canadian politician, member of the Legislative Assembly of Saskatchewan (1964–1982, 1986–1991).
- Jacques Delelienne, 91, Belgian Olympic athlete (1952).
- Morris Foster, 83, Irish Olympic racing cyclist (1968).
- Donald S. Gann, 87, American trauma surgeon.
- Pranab Kumar Gogoi, 83, Indian politician, MLA (since 2001).
- Paul Goldstene, 89, American political scientist.
- John Grant, 70, Scottish science fiction writer.
- Hsueh Shou Sheng, 93, Chinese-Canadian academic.
- Durul Huda, 64, Bangladeshi politician, MP (1988–1990), mayor of Rajshahi City Corporation (1990).
- David Kessler, 60, French senior official (Conseil supérieur de l'audiovisuel, Centre national du cinéma et de l'image animée).
- Douglas Knapp, 70, American cinematographer and camera operator (Assault on Precinct 13, Star Trek: Voyager).
- William John McNaughton, 93, American-born Roman Catholic prelate, Bishop of Incheon (1961–2002).
- Eric Parkin, 95, English pianist.
- Vilen Prokofyev, 18, Kazakh ice hockey player (Snezhnye Barsy Astana), Ewing's sarcoma.
- Gene Reynolds, 96, American actor (Gallant Sons) and television producer (M*A*S*H, Lou Grant), heart failure.
- Frank H. T. Rhodes, 93, British-American academic, president of Cornell University (1977–1995).
- Josefa Rika, 32, Fijian cricketer (national team).
- Aurel Șelaru, 84, Romanian Olympic racing cyclist (1960).
- Valentyna Shevchenko, 84, Ukrainian politician, chairperson of the Presidium of the Supreme Soviet of the Ukrainian Soviet Socialist Republic (1985–1990).
- George Steiner, 90, French-American literary critic and essayist (After Babel).
- Jana Vápenková, 72, Czech Olympic volleyball player (1972).
- Yevgeny Vitkovsky, 69, Russian fantasy writer.
- Roy Walton, 87, English card magician.
- Willie Wood, 83, American Hall of Fame football player (Green Bay Packers).

=== 4 ===
- Giancarlo Bergamini, 93, Italian fencer, Olympic gold medalist (1956).
- Claudio Bonadio, 64, Argentine federal judge (Notebook scandal, AMIA bombing), brain tumor.
- Kamau Brathwaite, 89, Barbadian poet and academic.
- Bill Britten, 91, American actor (Bozo the Clown).
- Andrew Brough, 56, New Zealand musician and songwriter (Straitjacket Fits).
- Gil Coan, 97, American baseball player (Washington Senators, Baltimore Orioles, New York Giants).
- José Luis Cuerda, 72, Spanish film director (Butterfly's Tongue, Amanece, que no es poco), producer (The Others) and screenwriter, Goya winner (1987, 1988, 2000, 2009).
- Jean Faggion, 88, French Olympic pistol shooter (1972, 1976).
- Marie-Fanny Gournay, 93, French politician.
- Abadi Hadis, 22, Ethiopian Olympic long-distance runner (2016).
- Tibor Halgas, 38, Hungarian footballer (Diósgyőri VTK, BKV Előre SC), traffic collision.
- Terry Hands, 79, British theatre director (Royal Shakespeare Company).
- Peter Hogg, 80, New Zealand-born Canadian lawyer and legal scholar.
- Volodymyr Inozemtsev, 55, Ukrainian triple jumper.
- Laurie Johnson, 92, Barbadian cricketer (Derbyshire).
- Volker David Kirchner, 77, German violist and composer.
- Dick Koecher, 93, American baseball player (Philadelphia Phillies).
- Romualdas Lankauskas, 87, Lithuanian writer and playwright.
- Nadia Lutfi, 83, Egyptian actress (The Night of Counting the Years, Saladin the Victorious).
- Bonnie MacLean, 80, American psychedelic poster artist.
- Asiwaju Yinka Mafe, 46, Nigerian politician.
- Donatien Mavoungou, 72, Gabonese physician and fraudster.
- Alice Mayhew, 87, American book editor and publisher (Simon & Schuster).
- L. Jacques Ménard, 74, Canadian businessman, Chancellor of Concordia University (2012–2014).
- Jane Milmore, 64, American playwright, television writer and producer (Martin, Newhart, The Hughleys), pancreatic cancer.
- Zwy Milshtein, 85, Romanian-born French painter.
- Gianni Minervini, 91, Italian film producer (Berlinguer, I Love You, Where's Picone?, Marrakech Express), Nastro d'Argento winner (1984).
- Daniel arap Moi, 95, Kenyan politician, MP (1963–2004), Vice President (1967–1978) and President (1978–2002), multiple organ failure.
- Nguyễn Văn Chiếu, 70, Vietnamese martial artist, master of Vovinam.
- William Oxley, 80, English poet and philosopher.
- Ljiljana Petrović, 81, Serbian singer ("Neke davne zvezde").
- Eugen Pleško, 71, Croatian Olympic cyclist (1972).
- Frank Plummer, 67, Canadian microbiologist (rVSV-ZEBOV vaccine).
- Benito Sarti, 83, Italian footballer (Sampdoria, Juventus, national team).
- Teodor Shanin, 89, Lithuanian-born British sociologist.
- Alexander Skvortsov, 65, Russian ice hockey player, Olympic champion (1984).
- Irena Soukupová, 55, Czech Olympic rower.
- Fernando Suarez, 52, Filipino Roman Catholic priest, heart attack.

=== 5 ===
- Aidar Akayev, 43, Kyrgyz politician, President of the National Olympic Committee (2004–2005), cardiac arrest.
- Jack Atchason, 83, American football player (Boston Patriots, Houston Oilers).
- Donnell Baker, 46, American football player (St. Louis Rams).
- Edwin Barbosa, 51, Brazilian percussionist.
- Carlos Barisio, 69, Argentine footballer (Gimnasia, All Boys, Ferro Carril Oeste), lung cancer.
- Eamonn Boyce, 94, Irish IRA volunteer.
- Buddy Cage, 73, American pedal steel guitarist (New Riders of the Purple Sage, Great Speckled Bird), multiple myeloma.
- Diane Cailhier, 73, Canadian filmmaker and director.
- Stanley Cohen, 97, American biochemist, Nobel Prize laureate (1986).
- Kevin Conway, 77, American actor (Gettysburg, Thirteen Days, Oz), heart attack.
- Ian Cushenan, 86, Canadian ice hockey player (Montreal Canadiens, Chicago Blackhawks), Stanley Cup champion (1959).
- Gyurme Dorje, 69, Scottish Buddhist philosopher.
- Kirk Douglas, 103, American actor (Spartacus, Paths of Glory, Seven Days in May), Honorary Oscar winner (1996).
- F. X. Feeney, 66, American screenwriter (Frankenstein Unbound, The Big Brass Ring), film director and film critic.
- James Leo Garrett Jr., 94, American theologian.
- Naadodigal Gopal, 54, Indian actor and comedian, heart attack.
- Irwin Kremen, 94, American artist.
- Bill Oates, 80, American basketball coach.
- Beverly Pepper, 97, American sculptor.
- Lawrence W. Pierce, 95, American jurist, Judge of the U.S. District Court for Southern New York (1971–1981) and Court of Appeals for the Second Circuit (1981–1995).
- Dmitry Ponomarev, 67, Russian entrepreneur.
- Yves Pouliquen, 88, French ophthalmologist, member of the Académie française (since 2001).
- Mohammad Shafiq, Pakistani politician, MLA (since 2015), cardiac arrest.
- Rajendra Prakash Singh, 75, Indian politician, MLA (1990–1998), cancer.
- John C. Whitcomb, 95, American theologian and author (The Genesis Flood).

=== 6 ===
- Dick Atha, 88, American basketball player (New York Knicks, Detroit Pistons).
- Cyril Bardsley, 88, English track cyclist.
- Francie Brolly, 82, Irish politician, MLA (2003–2010).
- Rush Brown, 65, American football player (St. Louis Cardinals).
- Raphaël Coleman, 25, British actor (Nanny McPhee, It's Alive, The Fourth Kind), heart failure.
- Greg Hawick, 87, Australian rugby league football player (South Sydney Rabbitohs, national team) and coach (North Sydney Bears).
- Gioacchino Illiano, 84, Italian Roman Catholic prelate, bishop of Nocera Inferiore-Sarno (1987–2011).
- Roger Kahn, 92, American author (The Boys of Summer).
- Earl Kemp, 90, American publisher and editor, fall.
- Malik Ata Muhammad Khan, 78, Pakistani feudal lord and politician.
- Bruno Léchevin, 68, French trade unionist (Électricité de France).
- Jerry Levin, 87, American journalist.
- Jan Liberda, 83, Polish football player (Polonia Bytom, AZ, national team) and manager.
- Ola Magnell, 74, Swedish musician, heart failure.
- Lynn Evans Mand, 95, American singer (The Chordettes).
- Miss Shefali, 76, Indian actress (Pratidwandi), kidney disease.
- André Neles, 42, Brazilian-Equatorial Guinean footballer (Botafogo Futebol Clube, São Carlos, Equatorial Guinea national team), heart attack.
- Qiu Jun, 72, Chinese bodybuilder, COVID-19.
- Bommireddy Sundara Rami Reddy, 84, Indian politician, MLA (1978–1983, 1985–1994).
- Peter Rockwell, 83, American sculptor.
- Charles Royster, 75, American historian.
- Nello Santi, 88, Italian conductor.
- J. B. Sumarlin, 87, Indonesian economist and politician, Minister of Finance (1988–1993).
- Krishna Baldev Vaid, 92, Indian writer.
- Jhon Jairo Velásquez, 57, Colombian hitman, drug dealer and extortionist (Medellín Cartel), esophageal cancer.
- Wang Jin, 93, Chinese archaeologist, thoracic spinal tuberculosis.

=== 7 ===
- Mohammad S. Abdeli, Saudi Arabian footballer.
- Sir Leonard Appleyard, 81, British diplomat, Ambassador to China (1994–1997).
- Mykolas Arlauskas, 89, Lithuanian agronomist, signatory of the Act of March 11.
- Orson Bean, 91, American actor (Dr. Quinn, Medicine Woman, Being John Malkovich) and game show panelist (To Tell the Truth), traffic collision.
- Raju Bharatan, 86, Indian cricket journalist.
- Ron Calhoun, 86, Canadian non-profit executive (Canadian Cancer Society, Marathon of Hope).
- Ronny Drayton, 66, American guitarist.
- Angel Echevarria, 48, American baseball player (Colorado Rockies, Milwaukee Brewers, Chicago Cubs), fall.
- Lucille Eichengreen, 95, German Holocaust survivor and memoirist.
- Lenin El-Ramly, 74, Egyptian screenwriter (The Terrorist).
- Brian Glennie, 73, Canadian ice hockey player (Toronto Maple Leafs, Los Angeles Kings), Olympic bronze medallist (1968).
- James George, 101, Canadian diplomat.
- Mary Griffith, 85, American LGBT rights activist.
- Pierre Guyotat, 80, French novelist.
- Hong Ling, 53, Chinese geneticist and professor, COVID-19.
- Marilyn Jenkins, 85, American baseball player (Grand Rapids Chicks).
- Airat Khairullin, 49, Russian businessman and politician, member of the State Duma (since 2003), helicopter crash.
- Paul Koralek, 86, Austrian-born British architect.
- Bal Kudtarkar, 98, Indian radio personality.
- Jørgen E. Larsen, 74, Danish football player (Herfølge) and manager (Ghana national team, Qatar national team).
- Li Wenliang, 34, Chinese ophthalmologist and whistleblower, COVID-19.
- James McGarrell, 89, American painter.
- Nexhmije Pagarusha, 86, Albanian singer and actress.
- Brian Pilkington, 86, English footballer (Burnley, Bolton Wanderers, Barrow).
- Larry Popein, 89, Canadian ice hockey player (New York Rangers, Oakland Seals) and coach (Omaha Knights).
- Robert J. Reese, 72, American politician.
- Pablo Rosenkjer, 89, Argentine Olympic alpine skier (1948, 1952).
- Go Soo-jung, 24, South Korean actress and model.
- Harold Strachan, 94, South African writer and anti-apartheid activist.
- Ann E. Todd, 88, American actress.
- Wichie Torres, 67, Puerto Rican painter, cardiovascular disease.
- Grazia Volpi, 78, Italian film producer (Caesar Must Die, Fiorile).
- Steve Weber, 76, American folk singer, songwriter and guitarist (The Holy Modal Rounders, The Fugs).

=== 8 ===
- Paddy Broderick, 80, Irish jockey.
- Michael Bushby, 88, English cricketer (Cambridge University Cricket Club).
- Robert Conrad, 84, American actor (Hawaiian Eye, The Wild Wild West, Baa Baa Black Sheep), heart failure.
- Jacques Cuinières, 77, French photographer.
- David Gardner, 91, Canadian actor (RoboCop, Street Legal, Prom Night).
- Maurice Girardot, 98, French basketball player, Olympic silver medalist (1948).
- Aleksandr Golubev, 83, Russian intelligence officer (KGB, Foreign Intelligence Service).
- Victor Gorelick, 78, American comic book editor (Archie Comics).
- Mariano Gottifredi, 89, Italian Olympic rower (1968, 1972).
- Paula Kelly, 77, American actress (Night Court, Santa Barbara, Soylent Green) and dancer, chronic obstructive pulmonary disease.
- Erazim Kohák, 86, Czech philosopher and writer.
- Lew Mander, 80, New Zealand-born Australian organic chemist.
- Robert Massin, 94, French graphic designer, cerebral hemorrhage.
- Dave McCoy, 104, American businessman, founder of the Mammoth Mountain Ski Area.
- Ron McLarty, 72, American author, narrator and actor (Spenser: For Hire, Courage the Cowardly Dog, Champs).
- Bhagwat Patel, 84, Indian politician, MLA (1990–1993).
- Bill Robinson, 71, Canadian Olympic basketball player (1976).
- Carlos Rojas Vila, 91, Spanish author.
- Sankar Sen, 92, Indian academic and politician, vice chancellor of Jadavpur University, MLA (1991–2001).
- Keelin Shanley, 51, Irish journalist and newscaster (RTÉ News: Six One), cancer.
- Volker Spengler, 80, German actor (In a Year of 13 Moons, The Third Generation, The Marriage of Maria Braun).
- Yi Hae-won, 100, South Korean princess, head of the House of Yi (since 2005).

=== 9 ===
- Terry Bamford, 77, British social worker.
- Goldie Brangman-Dumpson, 102, American nurse.
- Sir John Cadogan, 89, British organic chemist.
- Don Coleman, 87, American high school basketball coach.
- Délizia, 67, Belgian singer.
- Abdel Aziz El Mubarak, 69, Sudanese singer, pneumonia.
- Marvin P. Feinsmith, 87, American bassoonist.
- Richard J. Fox, 92, American real estate developer.
- Mirella Freni, 84, Italian operatic soprano.
- David Gistau, 49, Spanish TV writer and novelist, brain injury.
- Margareta Hallin, 88, Swedish operatic soprano.
- Sorrel Hays, 79, American pianist and composer.
- Giriraj Kishore, 82, Indian writer, heart attack.
- Delores J. Knaak, 90, American educator and politician, member of the Minnesota Senate (1977–1980).
- Enrique Marin, 84, Spanish-born French painter and sculptor.
- Peter McCall, 83, English footballer (Bristol City, Oldham Athletic).
- Shane Nightingale, 60, Australian rugby union player, cancer.
- P. Parameswaran, 91, Indian historian and political activist (Rashtriya Swayamsevak Sangh).
- Carlos Julio Pereyra, 97, Uruguayan politician, Senator (1966–2005), kidney failure.
- Karl-Heinz Rädler, 84, German astrophysicist.
- K. Jayachandra Reddy, 90, Indian jurist, Judge of the Supreme Court (1979–1980) and Chairman of the Press Council (2001–2005).
- Donald Russell, 99, British classicist and academic.
- Sergei Slonimsky, 87, Russian composer (The Republic of ShKID, The Mysterious Wall, Summer Impressions of Planet Z), pianist and musicologist.
- Alvin V. Tollestrup, 95, American physicist.
- Sergiy Vilkomir, 63, Ukrainian-born American computer scientist.

=== 10 ===
- Saïd Amara, 75, Tunisian handball player and coach (Espérance Sportive de Tunis, national team).
- Efigenio Ameijeiras, 88, Cuban revolutionary and military commander (Bay of Pigs Invasion), sepsis.
- Álvaro Barreto, 84, Portuguese politician.
- Claire Bretécher, 79, French cartoonist, co-founder of L'Écho des savanes.
- Diana Garrigosa, 75, Spanish teacher and activist (Pasqual Maragall Foundation).
- Mario Ghella, 90, Italian Olympic cyclist.
- Waqar Hasan, 87, Pakistani cricketer (national team).
- Robert Hermann, 88, American mathematician, pneumonia.
- Raymon Lacy, 97, American baseball player (Homestead Grays, Houston Eagles).
- Lin Zhengbin, 62, Chinese physician and organ transplant expert, COVID-19.
- Ignatius Datong Longjan, 75, Nigerian politician, Senator (since 2019).
- Ailsa Maxwell, 97, Scottish codebreaker and historian.
- Lyle Mays, 66, American jazz pianist and composer (Pat Metheny Group).
- Marge Redmond, 95, American actress (The Flying Nun, The Fortune Cookie, Family Plot).
- Dick Scott, 86, American baseball player (Los Angeles Dodgers, Chicago Cubs).
- Rubén Selman, 56, Chilean football referee, heart attack.
- Shariff Abdul Samat, 36, Singaporean footballer (Tampines Rovers, Hougang United, national team).
- John Smith, 83, Australian cricketer (Victoria).
- Pavel Vilikovský, 78, Slovak writer.
- Hussein M. Zbib, 61, Lebanese-born American engineer.

=== 11 ===
- François André, 52, French politician, Deputy (since 2012), lung cancer.
- Maurice Byblow, 73, Canadian politician.
- Bob Cashell, 81, American politician, Lieutenant Governor of Nevada (1983–1987) and mayor of Reno (2002–2014).
- George Coyne, 87, American Roman Catholic priest and astronomer, director of the Vatican Observatory (1978–2006), cancer.
- Jim Cullinan, 77, Irish hurler (Newmarket-on-Fergus).
- Paul English, 87, American drummer (Willie Nelson), pneumonia.
- Jean-Pierre Gallet, 76, Belgian journalist (RTBF).
- Jamie Gilson, 86, American author.
- Raj Kumar Gupta, 85, Indian politician, MLA (2002–2007).
- Ron Haddrick, 90, Australian cricketer and actor (The Stranger, Dot and Santa Claus, Quigley Down Under).
- Louis-Edmond Hamelin, 96, Canadian geographer.
- Yasumasa Kanada, 70, Japanese mathematician, myocardial ischemia.
- Jack Kramer, 80, Norwegian footballer (Vålerenga, national team).
- Dietrich Leh, 76, German Olympic weightlifter.
- Jane Lokan, 98, American politician, member of the Oregon House of Representatives (1995–2001).
- Anne Windfohr Marion, 81, American heiress and art patron, co-founder of Georgia O'Keeffe Museum.
- Sammy McCarthy, 88, British boxer.
- Jacques Mehler, 83, French cognitive psychologist.
- Katsuya Nomura, 84, Japanese Hall of Fame baseball player (Nankai Hawks) and manager (Yakult Swallows).
- Timothy Porteous, 86, Canadian administrator.
- Ramjit Raghav, 104, Indian wrestler and farmer, world's oldest father, house fire.
- Valery Reinhold, 77, Russian footballer (Spartak Moscow).
- Marcelino dos Santos, 90, Mozambican poet and politician, Vice President of FRELIMO (1970–1977) and President of the Assembly of the Republic (1977–1994).
- Joseph Shabalala, 79, South African musician (Ladysmith Black Mambazo).
- Betty Siegel, 89, American academic, president of Kennesaw State University (1981–2006).
- David Stout, 77, American writer.
- Ferdinand Ulrich, 88, German Catholic philosopher.
- Joseph Vilsmaier, 81, German film director (Stalingrad, Brother of Sleep, Comedian Harmonists).

=== 12 ===
- Javier Arévalo, 82, Mexican artist, heart failure.
- Whitlow Au, 79, American bioacoustics specialist.
- Jeanne Beaman, 100, American choreographer.
- Benon Biraaro, 61, Ugandan military officer, colon cancer.
- Christie Blatchford, 68, Canadian journalist (The Globe and Mail, National Post, Toronto Sun), lung cancer.
- Hubert Boulard, 49, French comic book author.
- Miguel Cordero del Campillo, 95, Spanish veterinarian and parasitologist, Senator (1977–1979), rector of the University of León (1984–1986).
- Simone Créantor, 71, French athlete.
- Takis Evdokas, 91, Cypriot politician and psychiatrist, founder of the Democratic National Party.
- Geert Hofstede, 91, Dutch social psychologist.
- Charles Hubbard, 79, Canadian politician.
- Frederick R. Koch, 86, American collector and philanthropist.
- Mike Lilly, 70, American banjo player and singer, leukemia.
- Hansjoachim Linde, 93, German inspector general.
- Hamish Milne, 80, English pianist.
- Nikolai Moskvitelev, 93, Russian military officer (Soviet Naval Aviation, Soviet Air Defence Forces).
- Victor Olaiya, 89, Nigerian highlife trumpeter.
- Christopher Pole-Carew, 88, British newspaper editor (Nottingham Evening Post) and High Sheriff of Nottinghamshire (1979).
- Wendell Rodricks, 59, Indian fashion designer.
- Mahima Silwal, Nepali actress, traffic collision.
- Søren Spanning, 68, Danish actor (Jul i Valhal, Headhunter, A Royal Affair).
- Goro Takeda, 98, Japanese general.
- T. Tali, 77, Indian politician, MLA (1977–1982, 1987–1989, 1993–2008).
- Nikitas Venizelos, 89, Greek businessman (Venizelos SA) and politician, MP (1974–1981, 1993–1996) and Deputy Speaker (1993–1996).
- Cheryl Wheeler-Dixon, 59, American stuntwoman (Back to the Future Part II, Thor, They Live), shot.
- Tamás Wichmann, 72, Hungarian sprint canoeist, Olympic silver (1968, 1972) and bronze medalist (1976).
- Joe Zbacnik, 82, American curler.

=== 13 ===
- Ronne Arnold, 81–82, American-born Australian dancer, dance teacher, choreographer and actor.
- Sir Michael Berridge, 81, Southern Rhodesian-born British biochemist.
- Aleksey Botyan, 103, Soviet-Armenian spy and intelligence officer.
- Sir Des Britten, 82, New Zealand television chef, restaurateur and Anglican priest, cancer.
- Henry T. Brown, 87, American chemical engineer.
- Ecomet Burley, 65, American football player (Toronto Argonauts, Winnipeg Blue Bombers, Hamilton Tiger-Cats).
- Valeri Butenko, 78, Russian football referee (1986 FIFA World Cup).
- Renzo Chiocchetti, 74, Italian Olympic cross-country skier (1972, 1976).
- Christophe Desjardins, 57, French violist.
- Franco Del Prete, 76, Italian musician (Napoli Centrale).
- Tatiana Fabergé, 89, French CERN secretary.
- Clifford B. Janey, 73, American school superintendent.
- Herman Kahan, 93, Romanian-born Norwegian businessman and Holocaust survivor.
- James Kaiser, 90, American electrical engineer.
- Liliane de Kermadec, 92, French film director and screenwriter.
- Ai Kidosaki, 94, Japanese author and chef, heart failure.
- David Lane, 92, American politician, Massachusetts state representative (1973–1978).
- Carlo de Leeuw, 59, Dutch footballer (Feyenoord, SC Cambuur), tongue cancer.
- Michel Lequenne, 98, French politician and writer.
- Buzzy Linhart, 76, American folk-rock singer and songwriter ("Friends").
- Liu Shouxiang, 61, Chinese watercolour painter, COVID-19.
- Ryan McDonald, 89, American actor (Days of Our Lives, The Odd Couple, Falcon Crest).
- Charles James McDonnell, 88, American Roman Catholic bishop.
- Ralph Mercier, 83, Canadian politician, mayor of Charlesbourg (1984–2001).
- Karel Neffe, 71, Czech rower, Olympic bronze medalist (1972).
- Rajendra K. Pachauri, 79, Indian economist and engineer, Chairman of the Intergovernmental Panel on Climate Change (2002–2015).
- Daniel M. Pierce, 91, American politician, member of the Illinois House of Representatives (1965–1985).
- Charles H. Pitman, 84, American lieutenant general, cancer.
- Malcolm Pyke, 81, English footballer (West Ham United, Crystal Palace, Dartford).
- Rafael Romero Marchent, 93, Spanish film director (Dead Men Don't Count, Sartana Kills Them All), actor (Mare Nostrum) and screenwriter.
- Yoshisada Sakaguchi, 80, Japanese voice actor (Reign: The Conqueror, Jin-Roh: The Wolf Brigade, Appleseed), colorectal cancer.
- Imtilemba Sangtam, 74, Indian politician, MLA (2003–2008, 2013–2018).
- Chuck Shelton, 84, American football player (Pittsburg State) and coach (Drake Bulldogs, Utah State Aggies).
- Zara Steiner, 91, American-born British historian and academic.
- Marie Stiborová, 70, Czech politician.
- Taty Sumirah, 68, Indonesian badminton player, 1975 Uber Cup winner, lung disease.
- Jimmy Thunder, 54, Samoan-born New Zealand heavyweight boxer, Commonwealth Games champion (1986), complications from brain surgery.

=== 14 ===
- Graham Adams, 86, English-born Canadian football player (Plymouth Argyle) and manager.
- Peter Iornzuul Adoboh, 61, Nigerian Roman Catholic prelate, bishop of Katsina-Ala (since 2013).
- Syed Imtiaz Ahmed, 65, Indian cricketer (Karnataka).
- Abdul Hafeez Khan Al Yousefi, 82, Pakistani-born Emirati agronomist, leukemia.
- Gilbert Belin, 92, French politician and sculptor, Senator (1974–1983) and mayor of Brassac-les-Mines (1971–2001).
- Alwin Brück, 88, German politician.
- Malhotra Chamanlal, 84, Indian cricketer.
- Ivo Cocconi, 90, Italian footballer (Parma).
- Lynn Cohen, 86, American actress (Sex and the City, Munich, The Hunger Games: Catching Fire).
- Jimmy Conway, 73, Irish footballer (Fulham, Portland Timbers, national team).
- Robert H. Dyson, 92, American archaeologist.
- Garrett Fitzgerald, 65, Irish rugby union player and coach.
- Brian Jackson, 86, English footballer (Liverpool, Peterborough United).
- Kenneth Keniston, 90, American social psychologist.
- Adama Kouyaté, 92, Malian photographer.
- Reinbert de Leeuw, 81, Dutch conductor, composer and pianist.
- Matvey Natanzon, 47, Russian-born Israeli backgammon player.
- Godfrey O'Donnell, 80, Northern Irish priest, president of the Irish Council of Churches (2012–2014).
- K. P. Rajendra Prasad, Indian politician, MLA (2001–2006), cancer.
- Decebal Traian Remeș, 70, Romanian economist and politician, Minister of Finance (1998–2000).
- Michel Ragon, 95, French art historian and critic.
- Christophoros Rakintzakis, 88, Greek Orthodox prelate.
- Esther Scott, 66, American actress (Boyz n the Hood, Dreamgirls, Hart of Dixie), heart attack.
- Sonam Sherpa, 48, Indian guitarist (Parikrama), cardiac arrest.
- John Shrapnel, 77, English actor (Gladiator, Troy, 101 Dalmatians), lung cancer.
- Abdus Sobhan, 83, Bangladeshi politician and convicted war criminal, MP (1991–1995, 2001–2006).
- Sun Ruyong, 92, Chinese ecologist, heart attack.
- Thrinimong Sangtam, 87, Indian politician, MLA (1987–1989).
- Masao Takahashi, 90, Canadian judoka.
- Clayton Williams, 88, American businessman and politician, pneumonia.

=== 15 ===
- Shahnaz Ansari, 50, Pakistani politician, MPA (since 2013), shot.
- David Clewell, 65, American poet, Poet Laureate of Missouri (2010–2012).
- Louis A. Craco, 86, American lawyer.
- Virgil C. Dechant, 89, American Roman Catholic fraternity leader, Supreme Knight of the Knights of Columbus (1977–2000).
- Duan Zhengcheng, 85, Chinese engineer, COVID-19.
- Tony Fernández, 57, Dominican baseball player (Toronto Blue Jays, San Diego Padres, Cleveland Indians), complications from kidney disease and stroke.
- Caroline Flack, 40, English television and radio presenter (The X Factor, Love Island, I'm a Celebrity: Extra Camp), suicide by hanging.
- Jamey Gambrell, 65, American translator, cancer.
- Naeemul Haque, 70, Pakistani political advisor, blood cancer.
- Amie Harwick, 38, American therapist, homicide.
- Rudy Hayes, 85, American football player (Pittsburgh Steelers).
- A. E. Hotchner, 102, American editor and novelist, co-founder of Newman's Own.
- Noor Hussain, 90, Bangladeshi politician, MP (1986–1988).
- Simon Kagugube, 65, Ugandan lawyer and corporate executive, heart failure.
- A. K. M. Jahangir Khan, 80, Bangladeshi film producer (Chandranath, Shuvoda).
- Éric Laforge, 56, French radio show host.
- Vatroslav Mimica, 96, Croatian film director (The Jubilee of Mr Ikel, Prometheus of the Island, Anno Domini 1573) and screenwriter.
- Prince Kudakwashe Musarurwa, 31, Zimbabwean singer-songwriter, lung cancer.
- Ahmed Abdel Rahman Nasser, 85, Egyptian air marshal.
- Hilmi Ok, 88, Turkish football referee (UEFA Euro 1980).
- Lavy Pinto, 90, Indian Olympic sprinter (1952).
- Dennis Remmert, 81, American football player (Buffalo Bills).
- Donald Stratton, 97, American naval seaman and memoirist (USS Arizona).
- David Sturtevant Ruder, 90, American jurist and academic.
- Karl Ludwig Schweisfurth, 89, German businessman.
- Sheu Yu-jer, 67, Taiwanese economist and politician, Minister of Finance (2016–2018).
- Wilfried Thaler, 85, Austrian cyclist.
- Ron Thompson, 66, American blues guitarist (John Lee Hooker).
- Léon Wurmser, 89, Swiss psychoanalyst.
- José Zalaquett, 77, Chilean lawyer and civil rights activist.
- Vic Zucco, 84, American football player (Chicago Bears).

=== 16 ===
- Henry Akin, 75, American basketball player (New York Knicks, Seattle SuperSonics, Kentucky Colonels).
- Duane Alexander, 79, American physician (NICHD), complications from Alzheimer's disease.
- Md. Rahamat Ali, 74, Bangladeshi politician, Minister of Local Government, Rural Development and Co-operatives (1999–2001), MP (1991–1995, 1996–2006, 2008–2018).
- Graeme Allwright, 93, New Zealand-born French singer-songwriter.
- Joan Armengol, 97, Andorran politician, Mayor of Andorra la Vella (1970–1971).
- David P. Bond, 68, American journalist.
- Didier Cabestany, 50, French rugby league footballer.
- Zoe Caldwell, 86, Australian actress (Master Class, Lilo & Stitch, Extremely Loud & Incredibly Close), 4-time Tony winner, complications from Parkinson's disease.
- Pearl Carr, 98, English singer (Pearl Carr & Teddy Johnson).
- Habul Chakraborty, 60, Indian politician, MLA (2011–2016).
- Charles Chihara, 87, American philosopher.
- John Cockett, 92, English field hockey player, Olympic bronze medallist (1952).
- Bob Cooper, 82, American-born Australian surfer, cancer.
- Frances Cuka, 83, British actress (Scrooge, The Watcher in the Woods, Snow White: A Tale of Terror).
- Clyde Davenport, 98, American old-time fiddler and banjo player.
- Jason Davis, 35, American actor (Recess, Beverly Hills Ninja, Mafia!), fentanyl overdose.
- Andrew Fairfield, 76, American bishop.
- Harry Gregg, 87, Northern Irish footballer (Manchester United), Munich air disaster survivor.
- Loek Hollander, 81, Dutch karate master.
- Barry Hulshoff, 73, Dutch football player (Ajax, national team) and manager (Lierse).
- John Iliffe, 88, British computer designer.
- Theodore Johnson, 95, American Tuskegee Airman.
- Robert B. Jordan, 87, American politician, Lieutenant Governor of North Carolina (1985–1989), member of the North Carolina Senate (1977–1985).
- Arun Kumar Kar, 81, Indian politician, MLA (1988–1993), cardiac arrest.
- Corinne Lahaye, 72, French actress (Now Where Did the 7th Company Get to?, Le Bourgeois gentilhomme).
- Katharine Kyes Leab, 78, American publisher.
- Erickson Le Zulu, 41, Ivorian disc jockey, cirrhosis.
- John Liebenberg, 61, South African photojournalist, complications from surgery.
- Dawn Mello, 88, American fashion executive (Bergdorf Goodman).
- Mack Miller, 87, American Olympic cross-country skier (1956, 1960).
- Ed Murphy, 78, American college basketball coach (Ole Miss Rebels).
- Kellye Nakahara, 72, American actress (M*A*S*H, Clue, 3 Ninjas Kick Back) and artist, cancer.
- André Patey, 78, French Olympic bobsledder.
- Agarala Eswara Reddi, 86, Indian politician, MLA (1967–1972, 1978–1983).
- M. Shamsur Rahman, 80, Bangladeshi academic, vice-chancellor of Jatiya Kabi Kazi Nazrul Islam University (2006–2009).
- Heinz Schaufelberger, 72, Swiss chess FIDE Master.
- Eric Stanford, 87, English sculptor.
- Barbara Steveni, 91, British conceptual artist.
- Glenn E. Summers, 94, American politician, member of the Florida House of Representatives (1947–1951).
- Larry Tesler, 74, American computer scientist (Apple Inc., Xerox), designer of cut, copy, and paste.
- Mátyás Tímár, 96, Hungarian economist and politician, Minister of Finance (1962–1967) and Governor of the National Bank (1975–1988). (death announced on this date)

=== 17 ===
- Chaudhary Khurshid Ahmed, 85, Indian politician, MLA (1962–1967, 1968–1972, 1977–1982, 1987–1988, 1996–2000), MP (1988–1989).
- Per Andersen, 90, Norwegian neuroscientist.
- Owen Bieber, 90, American labor union executive, president of the United Automobile Workers (1983–1995).
- Jens Bjerre, 98, Danish adventurer and filmmaker.
- Jean Clausse, 83, French runner (1959 Mediterranean Games, 1962 European Athletics Championships).
- Ja'Net DuBois, 87, American actress (Good Times, The PJs) and singer (The Jeffersons theme), cardiac arrest.
- Henry Gray, 95, American Hall of Fame blues pianist and singer.
- Robert Hebble, 86, American composer.
- Pandhari Juker, Indian make-up artist.
- Lorenzo León Alvarado, 91, Peruvian Roman Catholic prelate, bishop of Huacho (1967–2003).
- Jimmy Lester, 88, American politician.
- Greg Lewis, 66, American politician, member of the Kansas House of Representatives (2015–2019), glioblastoma.
- Terry Lineen, 84, New Zealand rugby union player (Auckland, national team).
- Mário da Graça Machungo, 79, Mozambican politician, Prime Minister (1986–1994).
- Kizito Mihigo, 38, Rwandan gospel singer, organist and peace activist, founder of the Kizito Mihigo Peace Foundation.
- Andrzej Popiel, 84, Polish actor.
- Charles Portis, 86, American author (True Grit, Norwood, Gringos).
- Ampitiye Rahula Maha Thera, 106, Sri Lankan Sinhalese Buddhist monk.
- Robert V. Rice, 95, American biochemist.
- Giorgi Shengelaia, 82, Georgian film director (Alaverdoba, Melodies of Vera Quarter, The Journey of a Young Composer).
- James G. Spady, 75, American writer, historian and journalist.
- Vladimír Svitek, 57, Slovak ice hockey player.
- Blaine Thacker, 79, Canadian politician.
- Georges Villeneuve, 97, Canadian politician, MP (1953–1958) and mayor of Dolbeau-Mistassini (1961–1968).
- Anna-Stina Wahlberg, 88, Swedish Olympic diver (1952, 1956).
- Rita Walters, 89, American politician, member of the Los Angeles City Council (1991–2001).
- Andrew Weatherall, 56, English music producer (Screamadelica), DJ and musician (The Sabres of Paradise, Two Lone Swordsmen), pulmonary embolism.
- Ror Wolf, 87, German writer and poet.
- Mickey Wright, 85, American Hall of Fame golfer, AP Athlete of the Year (1963, 1964), heart attack.
- Mustafa Yücedağ, 53, Turkish footballer (Ajax, Galatasaray, national team), heart attack.
- Sonja Ziemann, 94, German actress (The Black Forest Girl, The Heath Is Green, The Bridge at Remagen).

=== 18 ===
- Jaime Amat, 78, Spanish Olympic field hockey player (1964, 1972).
- Kishori Ballal, 82, Indian actress (Gair Kaanooni, Ek Alag Mausam, Aakramana).
- Pranjal Bharali, 60, Indian film producer (Antaheen Jatra, Suren Suror Putek, Junda Iman Gunda).
- José Bonaparte, 91, Argentine paleontologist.
- Flavio Bucci, 72, Italian actor (Suspiria, Last Stop on the Night Train, Il divo), heart attack.
- Jon Christensen, 76, Norwegian jazz drummer (Masqualero).
- Colonel Dinar, 33, Chadian comedian, stabbed.
- Veselin Đuretić, 86, Serbian historian.
- Philippe Forquet, 79, French actor.
- Yoshikichi Furui, 82, Japanese author and translator, hepatocellular carcinoma.
- Linda P. Johnson, 74, American politician, member of the North Carolina House of Representatives (since 2001), stroke.
- Eugeniusz Kabatc, 90, Polish writer and translator.
- Peter Montgomery, 72, American mathematician.
- Tapas Paul, 61, Indian actor (Dadar Kirti, Bhalobasa Bhalobasa, Mayabini) and politician, MLA (2001–2009) and MP (2009–2019), cardiac arrest.
- Bob Petty, 79, American television reporter and news anchor (WLS-TV), lung cancer.
- Peregrine Pollen, 89, English auctioneer (Sotheby's).
- Jean Schlegel, 94, French Olympic long-distance runner (1952).
- Ashraf Sinclair, 40, British-born Malaysian actor (Gol & Gincu The Series), heart attack.
- Sreten Stefanović, 103, Serbian Olympic gymnast (1952).
- Bert Sutherland, 83, American computer scientist.
- Seda Vermisheva, 87, Armenian-Russian poet and economist.

=== 19 ===
- Lucien Aimé-Blanc, 84, French police officer.
- Pete Babando, 94, Canadian ice hockey player (Detroit Red Wings, Chicago Black Hawks, Boston Bruins), Stanley Cup champion (1950).
- Ken Belford, 73-74, Canadian poet.
- P. K. Belliappa, 79, Indian cricketer (Tamil Nadu).
- Beatriz Bonnet, 89, Argentine actress, complications from Alzheimer's disease.
- Bob Cobert, 95, American composer (The Winds of War, War and Remembrance, The Night Stalker), pneumonia.
- Heather Couper, 70, British astronomer and broadcaster, President of the British Astronomical Association (1984–1986).
- James Cutsinger, 66, American author and academic.
- Bob Daimond, 73, British civil engineer.
- Jean Daniel, 99, Algerian-born French journalist, founder of L'Obs.
- Wilfred De'Ath, 82, British journalist (The Oldie).
- Wilhelm von der Emde, 97, German-Austrian civil engineer.
- Gust Graas, 95, Luxembourgish painter and businessman.
- Ann Grifalconi, 90, American author and illustrator, complications from dementia.
- Hector, 73, French singer.
- Thiruvalaputhur T A Kaliyamurthy, 71, Indian musical Thavil artist, heart attack.
- Ke Huibing, 41, Chinese professor.
- Jos van Kemenade, 82, Dutch politician, Minister of Education and Sciences (1973–1977, 1981–1982), Queen's Commissioner of North Holland (1992–2002).
- Inesa Kozlovskaya, 92, Russian physiologist, corresponding member of the Russian Academy of Sciences, and Honored Scientist of the Russian Federation (1996).
- Robert H. Lee, 86, Canadian real estate executive, philanthropist and university administrator, chancellor of the University of British Columbia (1993–1996).
- Hubert B. MacNeill, 97, Canadian politician and physician.
- Yervand Manaryan, 95, Iranian-born Armenian actor.
- K. S. Maniam, 78, Malaysian writer, bile duct cancer.
- José Mojica Marins, 83, Brazilian film director ("Coffin Joe", At Midnight I'll Take Your Soul), bronchopneumonia.
- Jerry Melvin, 90, American politician, member of the Florida House of Representatives (1968–1978).
- Lilian Mohin, 81, British feminist publisher (Onlywomen Press).
- Fernando Morán, 93, Spanish diplomat, Minister of Foreign Affairs (1982–1985), ambassador to the UN (1985–1987) and MEP (1987–1999).
- Germaine Poliakov, 101, Turkish-born French music teacher and Holocaust survivor.
- John Robertson, 90, Canadian Olympic sailor (1948, 1952).
- Wes Sandle, 84, New Zealand physicist (University of Otago).
- Pop Smoke, 20, American rapper ("Welcome to the Party", "Dior"), shot.
- Jack Youngerman, 93, American artist, complications from a fall.

=== 20 ===
- Mohammed Abaamran, 87, Moroccan actor and singer.
- Sadhu Aliyur, 57, Indian watercolor painter.
- Mary Rose Barrington, 94, British parapsychologist and barrister.
- Peter Louis Cakü, 66, Burmese Roman Catholic prelate, Bishop of Kengtung (since 2001).
- Peter Dreher, 87, German painter.
- Emmanuel Emovon, 90, Nigerian chemist and academic.
- Jeanne Evert, 62, American tennis player, ovarian cancer.
- Yona Friedman, 96, Hungarian-born French architect and theorist.
- Joanna Frueh, 72, American artist and feminist scholar, breast cancer.
- Zoe Gail, 100, South African-born American actress and singer.
- István Gáli, 76, Hungarian Olympic boxer (1968).
- Gilbert Kaenel, 70, Swiss archaeologist and historian.
- Usman Ullah Khan, 45, Pakistani Olympic boxer (1996, 2000), cancer.
- Bill Malarkey, 68, Manx politician, MHK (2006–2011, since 2015), cancer.
- Glynn Mallory, 81, American lieutenant general.
- Joaquim Pina Moura, 67, Portuguese politician and economist, Minister of Economy and Treasury (1997–2001) and MP (1995–2007).
- Claudette Nevins, 82, American actress (...All the Marbles, Tuff Turf, Sleeping with the Enemy).
- Jean-Claude Pecker, 96, French astronomer, President of the Société astronomique de France (1973–1976) and General Secretary of the International Astronomical Union (1964–1967).
- Dan Radakovich, 84, American football coach (Pittsburgh Steelers, Los Angeles Rams).
- Ronald B. Scott, 74, American author (Mitt Romney: An Inside Look at the Man and His Politics) and journalist, cancer.
- Nicholas Todd Sutton, 58, American serial killer, execution by electrocution.
- René Visse, 82, French politician, Deputy (1978–1981).
- Elyse Weinberg, 74, Canadian-American singer-songwriter, lung cancer.
- Jimmy Wheeler, 86, English football player (Reading) and manager (Bradford City).

=== 21 ===
- Shlomo Aronson, 83, Israeli historian and politologist.
- A.P. Indy, 31, American racehorse and sire.
- Lois Betteridge, 91, Canadian silversmith and goldsmith.
- Alan Caiger-Smith, 90, British potter.
- Michel Charasse, 78, French politician, Senator (1992–2010).
- Camila María Concepción, 28, American screenwriter and transgender rights activist, suicide.
- Nick Cuti, 75, American comic book artist (E-Man), cancer.
- Du Yulu, 79, Chinese actor (Yongzheng Dynasty), lung cancer.
- Sir David Evans, 95, British air chief marshal.
- Sir Sydney Giffard, 93, British diplomat and writer, ambassador to Switzerland (1980–1982) and Japan (1984–1986).
- Zygmunt Grodner, 88, Polish Olympic fencer (1952).
- Hisashi Katsuta, 92, Japanese voice actor (Astro Boy, Astroganger, Groizer X).
- Lal Khan, 64, Pakistani Marxist political theorist, cancer.
- Sir Andrew Leggatt, 89, British judge, Lord Justice of Appeal (1990–1997).
- Boris Leskin, 97, Russian actor (Heavenly Swallows, Vampire's Kiss, Men in Black).
- Phil Maloney, 92, Canadian ice hockey player (Boston Bruins, Chicago Blackhawks) and coach (Vancouver Canucks).
- Vince Marinello, 82, American sportscaster and convicted murderer.
- Lisel Mueller, 96, German-born American poet.
- Vera Paunović, 72, Serbian politician.
- Ilídio Pinto Leandro, 69, Portuguese Roman Catholic prelate, Bishop of Viseu (2006–2018).
- Vangelis Ploios, 82, Greek actor (The Auntie from Chicago, A Hero in His Slippers, The Countess of Corfu).
- Tao Porchon-Lynch, 101, American yoga master and author.
- Ouida Ramón-Moliner, 90, Irish-born Canadian anaesthetist.
- Baju Ban Riyan, 78, Indian politician, MLA (1967–1980), MP (1980–1989, 1996–2014).

=== 22 ===
- Krishna Bose, 89, Indian social worker and politician, MP (1996–2004).
- James Brown, 68, American painter, traffic collision.
- June Dally-Watkins, 92, Australian model and businesswoman.
- Kiki Dimoula, 88, Greek poet.
- Binoy Dutta, 75, Indian politician, MLA (1996–2011).
- Butch Gautreaux, 72, American politician, member of the Louisiana House of Representatives (1996–2000), Louisiana State Senate (2000–2012).
- Martin Gouterman, 88, American chemist.
- Harber H. Hall, 99, American politician, member of the Illinois House of Representatives (1967–1972), Illinois Senate (1973–1979).
- Nobuya Hoshino, 83, Japanese table tennis player.
- Jacques Houplain, 99, French painter and engraver.
- Mike Hughes, 64, American daredevil and flat Earth conspiracy theorist, rocket crash.
- Jeff Kimpel, 77, American meteorologist.
- Kazuhiko Kishino, 86, Japanese voice actor (Kinnikuman, Neptuneman, Burst Angel), heart failure.
- Maryan Plakhetko, 74, Ukrainian-born Russian footballer (SKA Lviv, CSKA Moscow, Soviet Union national team).
- Laurence Rappaport, 79, American politician, member of the New Hampshire House of Representatives (2008–2016).
- B. Smith, 70, American restaurateur and television host, complications from Alzheimer's disease.
- Thích Quảng Độ, 91, Vietnamese Buddhist monk, patriarch of the Unified Buddhist Sangha of Vietnam (since 2008).
- Simon Warr, 66, British broadcaster (BBC) and actor (That'll Teach 'Em), pancreatic and liver cancer.
- Linda Wolfe, 87, American journalist and author (Wasted: The Preppie Murder).
- Rita Wolfensberger, 91, Swiss pianist.
- Mark Zanna, 75, Canadian social psychologist.

=== 23 ===
- Ahmaud Arbery, 25, American jogger, shot.
- Pierre Aubenque, 90, French philosopher.
- Hervé Bourges, 86, French journalist and executive (Conseil supérieur de l'audiovisuel, France Télévisions, International Francophone Press Union).
- Russ Cochran, 82, American comic book publisher.
- Ramón Conde, 85, Puerto Rican baseball player (Chicago White Sox).
- Double Trigger, 28, Irish racehorse, Ascot Gold Cup winner (1995), heart attack.
- Amr Fahmy, 36, Egyptian football administrator, cancer.
- Stefan Florenski, 86, Polish footballer (Górnik Zabrze, GKS Tychy, national team).
- Quenby Fung, 54, Hong Kong novelist, cancer.
- Norene Gilletz, 79, Canadian kosher cookbook author.
- János Göröcs, 80, Hungarian football player (Újpest, Tatabánya, national team) and manager, Olympic bronze medalist (1960).
- Dino Kotopoulis, 87, American artist.
- Eddie Lake, 68, Australian footballer (Essendon).
- Zoran Modli, 71, Serbian journalist, radio disc jockey (Modulacije) and aviator.
- Helmut Nowak, 82, Polish footballer (Szombierki Bytom, Legia Warsaw, national team).
- Seaver Peters, 87, American ice hockey player (Dartmouth College).
- Sha Qinglin, 89, Chinese engineer, member of the Chinese Academy of Engineering.
- Vince Weber, 66, German blues pianist.
- Ray York, 86, American jockey, pneumonia.
- Zhou Tonghui, 95, Chinese analytical chemist, member of the Chinese Academy of Sciences.
- Margrit Zimmermann, 93, Swiss pianist and composer.

=== 24 ===
- Bob Andelman, 59, American journalist, author and talk show host, cancer.
- Andrzej Bryl, 62, Polish taekwondo practitioner.
- Mario Bunge, 100, Argentine philosopher of science.
- Robert Cabaj, 72, American psychiatrist, scholar and author.
- Diana Serra Cary, 101, American actress (The Darling of New York, Captain January, The Family Secret).
- Ben Cooper, 86, American actor (Johnny Guitar, Gunfight at Comanche Creek, Rebel in Town).
- István Csukás, 83, Hungarian poet and author.
- Clive Cussler, 88, American adventure novelist (Raise the Titanic!, Sahara) and underwater explorer, founder of the NUMA.
- Sonny Franzese, 103, Italian-born American mobster (Colombo crime family).
- Don Furner, 87, Australian rugby league coach (Eastern Suburbs, Canberra Raiders, national team).
- Ernie Gaskin, 86, English greyhound trainer.
- Bruce George, 77, British politician, MP (1974–2010), complications from Alzheimer's disease.
- Jiang Yiyuan, 92, Chinese agricultural engineer.
- Katherine Johnson, 101, American mathematician (NASA).
- Ayrat Karimov, 48, Russian footballer (SKA Rostov-on-Don, Torpedo Taganrog, Shakhter Karagandy).
- Sung Wan Kim, 79, Korean-born American pharmacologist and bioengineer.
- Jan Kowalczyk, 78, Polish show jumper, Olympic champion (1980).
- Johan van Loon, 85, Dutch ceramist and textile artist.
- John Lang Nichol, 96, Canadian politician.
- Roy Norris, 72, American serial killer.
- Frank Nowacki, 72, British architect, amyotrophic lateral sclerosis.
- Ida Stephens Owens, 80, American scientist.
- David Roback, 61, American guitarist (Mazzy Star, Rain Parade, Opal) and songwriter.
- Stephan Ross, 88, Polish-born American holocaust survivor, founder of New England Holocaust Memorial.
- Vasily Savvin, 80, Russian military officer, commander of the Internal Troops of Russia (1992).
- Peter Schimke, 59, American pianist and composer, suicide.
- Georg R. Sheets, 72, American historian.
- Guillermo Solá, 90, Chilean Olympic runner (1952).
- Dick Tamburo, 90, American college athletic director (Arizona State Sun Devils, Missouri Tigers, Texas Tech Red Raiders).
- Jahn Teigen, 70, Norwegian musician (Popol Ace).
- Olof Thunberg, 94, Swedish actor (Winter Light, Bamse, Amorosa).
- Tom Watkins, 70, English music manager (Pet Shop Boys).
- Juan Eduardo Zúñiga, 101, Spanish literary scholar and writer.

=== 25 ===
- Javier Arias Stella, 95, Peruvian pathologist and politician, Minister of Health (1963–1965, 1967–1968) and of Foreign Affairs (1980–1983), discovered the Arias-Stella reaction.
- Susan Beaumont, 83, English film actress.
- Lee Phillip Bell, 91, American television producer (The Bold and the Beautiful, The Young and the Restless).
- John L. Clendenin, 85, American businessman.
- Valerian D'Souza, 86, Indian Roman Catholic prelate, Bishop of Poona (1977–2009).
- Grace F. Edwards, 87, American author.
- Claude Flagel, 87, French musician.
- Clayton Glasgow, 82, Guyanese Olympic sprinter.
- Nesby Glasgow, 62, American football player (Indianapolis Colts, Seattle Seahawks), cancer.
- Kazuhisa Hashimoto, 61, Japanese video game programmer, creator of the Konami Code.
- Naimatullah Khan, 89, Pakistani politician, Mayor of Karachi (2001–2005).
- Hikmet Köksal, 88, Turkish military officer, Commander of the Army (1996–1997).
- Yuri Kuplyakov, 89, Russian diplomat, Soviet ambassador to Nigeria (1985–1990).
- Adam Maher, 47, Australian rugby league player (Cronulla Sharks, Gateshead Thunder, Hull F.C.), amyotrophic lateral sclerosis.
- Anthony C. Maiola, 96, American politician.
- Raymond Martin, 94, Australian chemist and academic administrator, vice-chancellor of Monash University (1977–1987).
- Hosni Mubarak, 91, Egyptian military officer and politician, President (1981–2011), Prime Minister (1981–1982) and Vice-President (1975–1981), kidney failure.
- Satya Nandan, Fijian diplomat, representative to the United Nations (1970–1976, 1993–1995) and ambassador to the Netherlands (1976–1980).
- Bernard Pingaud, 96, French writer.
- Peter Pritchard, 76, English turtle zoologist.
- Lívia Rusz, 89, Romanian-Hungarian graphic artist.
- Kurt Sakowski, 89, German Olympic racewalker.
- P. Sankaran, 72, Indian politician, MP (1998–1999) and MLA (2001–2006).
- Erico Spinadel, 90, Austrian-Argentine industrial engineer.
- Bob Steiner, 73, Canadian football player (Hamilton Tiger-Cats).
- George Yankowski, 97, American baseball player (Philadelphia Athletics, Chicago White Sox).
- Dmitry Yazov, 95, Russian military officer, Minister of Defence (1987–1991) and Marshal of the Soviet Union.

=== 26 ===
- Henry J. Abraham, 98, American scholar and writer.
- Donald E. Belfi, 84, American judge.
- Bhadreswar Buragohain, 74, Indian politician, MLA (1985–1990), MP (1990–1996).
- Sam Boghosian, 88, American football player (UCLA Bruins) and coach (Oregon State Beavers, Los Angeles Raiders).
- Eduardo Bort, 72, Spanish guitarist.
- Stroma Buttrose, 90, Australian architect and town planner.
- Betsy Byars, 91, American author (Summer of the Swans).
- Hans Deinzer, 86, German clarinetist.
- Sergei Dorensky, 88, Russian pianist.
- Muhamed Filipović, 90, Bosnian politician, writer and historian.
- Nick Apollo Forte, 81, American musician and actor (Broadway Danny Rose).
- Peter Frusetta, 87, American politician.
- Isgandar Hamidov, 71, Azerbaijani politician, Minister of Internal Affairs (1992–1993).
- Nexhmije Hoxha, 99, Albanian politician, MP (1948–1985) and chairwoman of the Democratic Front (1985–1990).
- Rudolf Kassel, 93, German classical philologist.
- Michel Leplay, 92, French Protestant pastor.
- Lionel D, 61, French radio host and rapper.
- Clinton Marius, 53, South African writer and performer.
- Michael Medwin, 96, English actor (Shoestring, Scrooge, The Army Game).
- Andrea Mugione, 79, Italian Roman Catholic prelate, Bishop of Cassano all'Jonio (1988–1998), Archbishop of Crotone-Santa Severina (1998–2006) and Benevento (2006–2016).
- Bijaya Kumar Nayak, 68, Indian politician, MLA (1995–2000).
- Terence Penelhum, 90, British-Canadian philosopher.
- Bertram Raven, 93, American academic.
- Annie Riis, 92, Norwegian writer.
- Corky Rogers, 76, American football coach (Robert E. Lee HS, Bolles School).
- Carl Slone, 83, American college basketball coach (George Washington Colonials, Richmond Spiders).
- David Smith, 78, Canadian politician, MP (1980–1984, 2002–2016).
- François Tajan, 57, French auctioneer, food poisoning.
- Roger Tully, 92, English dancer.
- Clementina Vélez, 73, Colombian doctor, academic and politician, MP (1990–1991, 1998–2002) and city councillor of Cali (1972–1986, 1992–1997, 2004–2019), heart attack.
- Kostas Voutsas, 88, Greek actor (Law 4000, Alice in the Navy, The Downfall) and writer, lung infection.

=== 27 ===
- Shelley Ackerman, 66, American astrologer and actress, cancer.
- Eduardo Alas Alfaro, 89, Salvadoran Roman Catholic prelate, Bishop of Chalatenango (1987–2007).
- R. D. Call, 70, American actor (Young Guns II, Into the Wild, EZ Streets), complications from back surgery.
- David Callister, 84, Manx broadcaster and politician.
- Tina Carline, 71–72, New Zealand television weather presenter (TV One), cancer.
- Sudhakar Chaturvedi, 122 (claimed), Indian Vedic scholar and courier (Mahatma Gandhi).
- Kevin Coogan, 67, American investigative journalist and author.
- Burkhard Driest, 80, German actor (Stroszek, Cross of Iron, Querelle).
- Eugene Dynarski, 86, American actor (Close Encounters of the Third Kind).
- Irvino English, 42, Jamaican footballer (national team), shot.
- Valdir Espinosa, 72, Brazilian football manager (Cerro Porteño, Botafogo, Corinthians), complications from surgery.
- Juan Diego González, 39, Colombian footballer (Once Caldas, La Equidad, Philadelphia Union). (body discovered on this date)
- Colin S. Gray, 76, British-American geopolitical writer.
- Samvel Karapetyan, 58, Armenian historian.
- Hadi Khosroshahi, 81, Iranian cleric and diplomat, COVID-19.
- Seiji Kurata, 74, Japanese photographer, lung cancer.
- Lillian Offitt, 81, American blues and R&B singer.
- Gloster Richardson, 77, American football player (Kansas City Chiefs, Dallas Cowboys, Cleveland Browns), Super Bowl Champion (1970, 1971).
- K. P. P. Samy, 57, Indian politician, MLA (2006–2011, since 2016).
- Sripal Silva, 59, Sri Lankan cricketer, injuries sustained in a traffic collision.
- Leroy Suddath, 89, American major general.
- Braian Toledo, 26, Argentine javelin thrower, Youth Olympic champion (2010), traffic collision.
- Suthep Wongkamhaeng, 85, Thai luk krung singer.
- Alki Zei, 94, Greek novelist and children's writer.

=== 28 ===
- Johnny Antonelli, 89, American baseball player (Boston/Milwaukee Braves, New York/San Francisco Giants, Cleveland Indians).
- Allen Boothroyd, 76, British industrial designer, co-founder of Meridian Audio, prostate cancer.
- Kenyel Brown, 40, American serial killer, suicide by gunshot.
- Ulambayaryn Byambajav, 35, Mongolian sumo wrestler, world champion (2006, 2007).
- Jaime Carbonell, 66, Uruguayan-born American computer scientist.
- Janusz Cisek, 65, Polish historian and academic, leukemia.
- Joe Coulombe, 89, American entrepreneur (Trader Joe's).
- Emmanuel Debarre, 71, French sculptor.
- Freeman Dyson, 96, British-born American physicist and mathematician (Dyson's transform, Rank of a partition, Dyson series), fall.
- Joyce Gordon, 90, American actress and pitchwoman.
- Sir Lenox Hewitt, 102, Australian public servant, Secretary of the Prime Minister's Department (1968–1971), Lewy body dementia.
- Muhammad Imara, 88, Egyptian Islamic scholar.
- S. Kathavarayan, 58, Indian politician, MLA (since 2019).
- Mahmoud Khayami, 90, Iranian industrialist and philanthropist.
- Balbir Singh Kullar, 77, Indian field hockey player, Olympic bronze medallist (1968), heart attack.
- Gennady Kuzmin, 74, Ukrainian chess player.
- Teresa Machado, 50, Portuguese Olympic discus thrower and shot putter (1992, 1996, 2000, 2004).
- Craig Mackay, 92, Canadian Olympic speed skater (1948, 1952).
- Baidyanath Prasad Mahto, 72, Indian politician, MLA (2000–2009), MP (2009–2014, since 2019).
- Stig-Göran Myntti, 94, Finnish football (VPS, VIFK, RU-38) and bandy player.
- Phil Prince, 93, American university football player (Clemson Tigers) and academic administrator, President of Clemson University (1994–1995).
- John Renton, American geologist.
- Carl Schell, 95, Canadian judoka.
- Shadakshari Settar, 84, Indian historian and archaeologist, pleural effusion.
- Esala Teleni, Fijian rugby player and military officer.

=== 29 ===
- Chloe Aaron, 81, American television executive (PBS), cancer and chronic obstructive pulmonary disease.
- Gérard Arseguel, 82, French poet.
- Avraham Barkai, 99, German-born Israeli historian.
- G. P. Mellick Belshaw, 91, American Episcopal prelate, Bishop of New Jersey (1983–1994).
- Bernard Briskin, 95, American businessman.
- Bill Bunten, 89, American politician, member of the Kansas House of Representatives (1962–1990) and Senate (2002–2004), Mayor of Topeka (2005–2013), pneumonia.
- Malcolm Chase, 63, British social historian, brain tumour.
- Raymond C. Fisher, 80, American jurist, Judge of the U.S. Court of Appeals for the Ninth Circuit (since 1999), cancer.
- Lynn Geesaman, 81, American photographer.
- Ian Lyall Grant, 104, British army officer and engineer.
- Bella Hammond, 87, American activist and political figure, First Lady of Alaska.
- Vito Kapo, 97, Albanian politician, Minister of Industry (1982–1990).
- Dieter Laser, 78, German actor (Lexx, The Ogre, The Human Centipede).
- Fiona MacCarthy, 80, English journalist and biographer.
- Arnaud Marquesuzaa, 85, French rugby union player (Racing 92, US Montauban).
- Eleanor Martin, 69, Australian dancer.
- Luis Alfonso Mendoza, 55, Mexican dubbing and voice actor, shot.
- Ceri Morgan, 72, Welsh darts player.
- Odile Pierre, 87, French organist and composer.
- Mohammad Ali Ramazani Dastak, 56, Iranian military officer and politician, MP (since 2020), influenza.
- Herman Redemeijer, 89, Dutch politician, member of the Senate (1987–1995).
- Bill Smith, 93, American jazz clarinetist and composer, complications from prostate cancer.
- Éva Székely, 92, Hungarian Hall of Fame swimmer, Olympic champion (1952).
- Andrei Vedernikov, 60, Russian racing cyclist, world champion (1981).
- Gene Waldorf, 84, American politician, member of the Minnesota House of Representatives (1977–1980) and Senate (1981–1993).
