= Ke Huibing =

Chinese management scientist (1979–2020)

- 柯卉兵
- Born: 5 February 1979; Huangmei County, Huanggang, Hubei, China
- Died: 19 February 2020 (aged 41); Wuhan, Hubei, China
- Education: Hubei University; Huazhong University of Science and Technology; Wuhan University
- Scientific career
- Fields: social security theory and policy, social welfare and social work
- Workplaces: Huazhong University of Science and Technology

Chinese name
- Chinese: 柯卉兵
Transcriptions
Standard Mandarin
- Hanyu Pinyin: Kē Huìbīng

Ke Huibing (Chinese: 柯卉兵, 5 February 1979 – 19 February 2020) was a Chinese management scientist, professor and doctoral advisor at the Huazhong University of Science and Technology.

== Career ==
Ke was educated at Law School of Hubei University, majoring in law, where he graduated in June 2002 and obtained a bachelor's degree. In June 2005, he graduated from the School of Sociology of Huazhong University of Science and Technology with a doctor's degree in management. In June 2008, he obtained a doctor's degree in management in Wuhan University Social Security Research Center. Since July 2008, he was a teacher of management science at the School of Social Sciences of Huazhong University of Science and Technology. His professional direction was social security theory and policy, social welfare and social work.

Ke was a member of China social security 30 forum young scholars Alliance. He was also the chairman of the labor union of School of Social Sciences.

== Health and death ==
Ke was diagnosed with malignant lymphoma in July 2019, he had received treatment from Wuhan Tongji Hospital for a long time. He planned to have surgery right after the Chinese Lunar New Year (24 January 2020), however, an unexpected coronavirus outbreak disrupted his treatment. On 10 February 2020, he was hospitalized. His colleagues raised money for him on an internet platform.

Ke died in Wuhan on 19 February 2020, aged 41. He was the fifth professor of the Huazhong University of Science and Technology who died during the coronavirus pandemic, other four professors being, Hong Ling, Lin Zhengbin, Liu Xiaoxian, and Duan Zhengcheng.

== Works ==
Ding, Jianding; Ke, Huibing (2004). "The Positive Employment Policy and Its Enlightenment". Journal of Huazhong University of Science and Technology: Edition of Social Sciences 2004 (2): 82–86.
