= Qiu Jun =

Qiu Jun may refer to:

- Qiu Jun (poet) (1421–1495), Chinese playwright and politician, member of the Hanlin Academy
- Qiu Jun (bodybuilder) (1948–2020), Chinese bodybuilder
- Qiu Jun (go player) (born 1982), Chinese go player

== See also ==
- 25042 Qiujun, a minor planet named for a Chinese engineer
