= Kartikey Sharma =

Indian graffiti artist and painter

- Born: Chennai, India
- Education: B.Tech
- Alma mater: Symbiosis Institute of Technology
- Known for: Graffiti art, Painting, Mural; Clean and Paint Project; 100WallCrawl
- Notable work: Closed Doors, Canvas against Cancer
- Website: https://www.kartikeysharma.org/

Kartikey Sharma is an Indian graffiti artist and painter from Maharashtra, India. He is known for beautifying various Indian cities with graffiti artworks. His has painted for Balewadi Sports Complex, Maharashtra State Lawn Tennis Association, and Maharashtra Open. Some of his notable artwork includes Closed Doors and Canvas against Cancer. His works have been exhibited in galleries like Colaba Arts, and Monalisa Kalagram, Koregaon Park. Kartikey Sharma founded non-profit initiatives like the Clean and Paint Project and 100WallCrawl, which focus on painting walls with graffiti art and imparting social messages with visuals.

== Early life and education ==
He holds B.tech in Mechanical engineering from the Symbiosis Institute of Technology, Pune. He later pursued a diploma in Business management. He began painting when he was in first grade. His father was in Indian Naval Air Arm. In 2009, he was diagnosed with cancer during his 12th-grade year, and he managed to recover He faced a second diagnosis of cancer in February 2016.

== Work and career ==
In 2016, Sharma founded Jumbish, an art company with the objective of promoting his artwork and creating employment opportunities for fellow artists. Over time, the company served as a platform for approximately 7,000 artists worldwide, allowing them to showcase and unleash their creative abilities. Jumbish also offered art services including creating sculptures, murals, and paintings.

In December 2017, Kartikey Sharma's art collection titled 'Canvas Against Cancer' was exhibited at Colaba Arts in Worli, Mumbai. The collection comprised 26 artworks that served as documentation of his journey through cancer. In April 2018, the Monalisa Kalagram Art Gallery hosted Kartikey's art exhibition, Canvas Against Cancer. In August 2018, the exhibition continued with another showcasing at Monalisa Kalagram in Koregaon Park, Pune.

In 2018, his company, Jumbish was featured as the Leaders of Tomorrow by ET Now. In February 2018, he delivered a TEDx talk at the Great Lakes Institute of Management in Chennai, talking about his journey, his battle with cancer, and his art.

In 2019, Desiblitz magazine included Sharma in their list of 10 Indian Contemporary Painters on Instagram, alongside renowned artists Bhupen Khakhar and Sadhu Aliyur.

In May 2021, Sharma, along with Daku and Yessiow, participated in the second edition of the Kannagi Art District in Chennai, organized by St+art India Foundation and Asian Paints, where they painted murals.

In 2019, Sharma initiated the Clean and Paint Project, wherein he painted 100 walls in Pune, Maharashtra with graffiti. In 2020, he launched the non-profit campaign called The #100wallcrawl, with the support of the Pune Municipal Corporation, painting walls with diverse subjects including abstract art, animals, and messages conveying social relevance. In March 2023, he was in collaboration with the Aditya Birla Education Trust to paint a 3,500-square foot wall with murals focused on Mental health.

== Art exhibitions ==
- 2017, Colaba Arts, Mumbai
- 2018, ABC Kalyaninagar, Pune
- 2019, Monalisa Kalagram, Koregaon Park, Pune
- 2021, Kian Gallery, Pune

== See also ==
- List of Indian artists
