= Hong Ling =

Hong Ling may refer to:

- Hong Ling (actress) (born 1994), Singaporean actress
- Hong Ling (geneticist) (1966–2020), Chinese geneticist and professor
