= Gérard Arseguel =

French poet (1938–2020)

- Born: 1938; Toulouse, France
- Died: 29 February 2020 (aged 81–82)
- Occupation: Poet

Gérard Arseguel (1938 – 29 February 2020) was a French poet.

== Biography ==
Gérard Arseguel lived in Thèze in the Alpes-de-Haute-Provence region.

He taught French and Latin at the Lycée Paul-Arène in Sisteron. He has collaborated with a number of literary magazines, including Les Cahiers du Sud and Nouvelle Revue Française. He is also co-founder of a magazine, Mantéia. In 1958, in Marseille, he published his first poems in Action poétique, Henri Deluy poetry magazine. From the second half of the 1970s onwards, these works were published on a regular basis by publishing houses such as Christian Bourgois Éditeur, Éditions Flammarion (Poésie collection), Fissile Éditions, Éditions Tarabuste and others. He died on February 29, 2020.

== Works ==
- Décharges (1979)
- Une méthode de discours sur la lumière (1979)
- Les Bleus du procédé (1981)
- Messes basses pour Mousba (1982)
- L’Arrivée sur le littoral (1984)
- Les Malheurs de Sophie (1984)
- Ce que parler veut dire (1987)
- Portrait du cœur sous les nuages (1988)
- À feu doux : House poetry (1990)
- Suivie du bleu (1993)
- Bruit d’ailes (1995)
- Heures d'hiver (1997)
- Théorie de l’envol (1996)
- Ça s’est passé en Haute-Provence (1997)
- Esthétique de l’abandon (2001)
- Le Journal du bord de terre : déclinaison (2003)
- L’Almanach des montagnes (2006)
- Âme, de quel divin ! (2008)
- Messes basses pour Mousba (2012)
- Autobiographie du bras gauche (2017)
- Le petit bois qu'aimait Gérard (2017)
- La Sainte (2019)
- Le Campanile de Sambuco (2019)
