= Lynn Geesaman =

American photographer (1938–2020)

Lynn Geesaman (1938 – February 29, 2020) was an American photographer.

Gessaman was born in Cleveland, Ohio, and she attended Wellesley College where she graduated with a degree in physics in 1960. Geesaman worked as a middle school math teacher in Minneapolis and began learning photography at age 33.

Geesaman's work included soft-focus photography that was a result of how she processed the prints she made. Although she is primarily known for her photographs of European gardens and canals, which she started visiting in 1987, Geesaman was already starting to be known for her photography even before starting to visit European garden. Her work is focused on light, and while originally she worked in black and white her later work adds color.

Geesaman was the 1992 Artist in Residence at the Bernheim Arboretum and Research Forest. An exhibit of Geesaman's works was held at the Stephen Cohen Gallery in Los Angeles in 2001.

In 2019 an exhibit of her work, Gardens: Aesthetic Intent, was held Scheinbaum & Russek Ltd. in Sante Fe.

Geesaman's work is included in the collections of the Whitney Museum of American Art, the Art Institute of Chicago, and the Museum of Contemporary Photography.
