= Hsueh Shou Sheng =

Chinese educator (1926–2020)

- 薛壽生
- Born: 8 March 1926; Shanghai, Republic of China
- Died: 3 February 2020 (aged 93); Vancouver, Canada

Academic background
- Education: Yenching University; University of Geneva

Academic work
- Discipline: Political scientist

Hsueh Shou Sheng (Chinese: 薛壽生; 8 March 1926 – 3 February 2020) was a Chinese educator who served as Vice-Chancellor of Nanyang University in Singapore (1972–1975) and the founding Rector of University of East Asia, Macau (1980–1986, 1988–1991).

== Biography ==
Hsueh Shou Sheng was born on 8 March 1926 in Shanghai, China. He received his Bachelor of Arts from Yenching University in Peking and Doctorat ès Sciences Politique from University of Geneva's Graduate Institute of International Studies.

Hsueh taught or conducted research at University of Hong Kong, University of Oxford, University of the Philippines, and Chinese University of Hong Kong (CUHK). From 1972 to 1975, he was the Vice-Chancellor of Nanyang University, Singapore. From 1977 to 1980, he served as the Head of United College, CUHK.

Hsueh was appointed as the founding Rector of the University of East Asia, Macau in 1980 where he served until 1986. He served as Rector again from 1988 to 1991. He was also appointed as Vice-Chairman of the Basic Law Drafting Committee of the Macau Special Administrative Region.

Hsueh received Chevalier de l'Ordre National du Mérite from French President Valéry Giscard d'Estaing and Grande Oficial da Ordem da Instrução Pública from Portuguese President Mário Soares. He was also awarded Honorary Doctorates by Soka University, Japan, and Universidade Aberta, Portugal.

== Death ==
Hsueh Shou Sheng died on 3 February 2020 in Vancouver, Canada. He is survived by his wife Grace, daughter Celina, and son-in-law Alfred.
