= Éric Laforge =

French radio host (1964–2020)

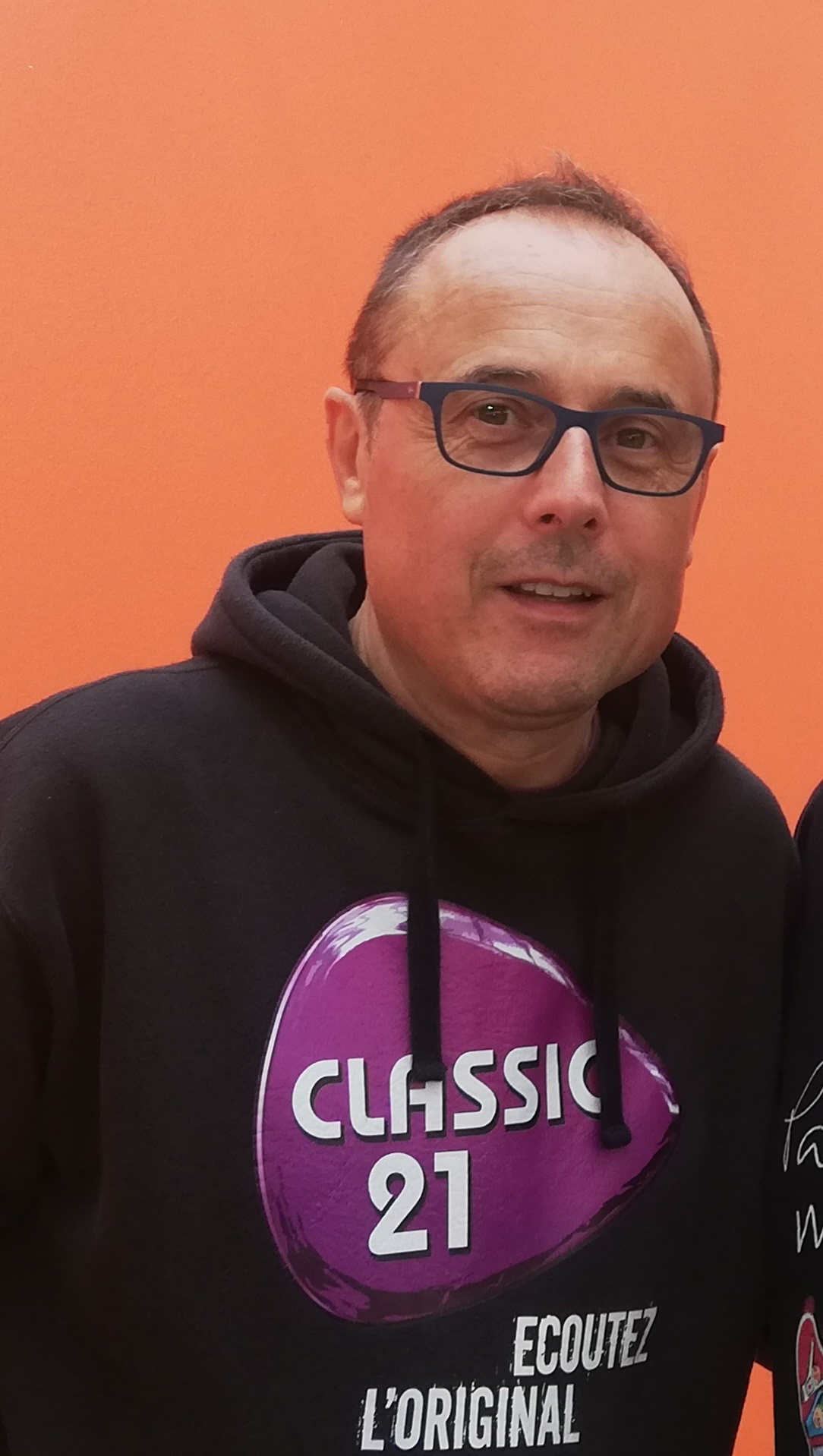
- Laforge in 2019
- Born: 24 January 1964; Compiègne, France
- Died: 15 February 2020 (aged 56); La Louvière, Belgium
- Occupation: Radio host

Éric Laforge (24 January 1964 – 15 February 2020) was a French radio host. He is best known for hosting the show Le Morning Club, which was broadcast on Classic 21.

== Biography ==
Laforge studied at the École supérieure de journalisme de Paris before working at various French radio stations, such as Europe 1, RTL2, NRJ, and Radio France. In 2004, he began working for Classic 21, appearing on shows such as Lunch Around the Clock, Men at Work, and Le Morning Club. He also ran a comic book column.

Laforge died of complications from surgery on 15 February 2020 at the age of 56.

== Publications ==
- Let's Rock
- Les Premières Fois (2014)
- Almanach pop-rock (2016)
- Calendrier 2018 pop-rock (2017)
- Almanach pop-rock 2 (2018)
