= Jiang Yiyuan =

Chinese agricultural engineer (1928–2020)

- Born: November 27, 1928; Changzhou, Jiangsu, China
- Died: February 24, 2020 (aged 91); Harbin, Heilongjiang, China
- Education: University of Nanking; St. Petersburg National Agricultural University
- Scientific career
- Fields: Agricultural engineering
- Workplaces: Northeast Agricultural University

Chinese name
- Traditional Chinese: 蔣亦元
- Simplified Chinese: 蒋亦元
Transcriptions
Standard Mandarin
- Hanyu Pinyin: Jiǎng Yìyuán

Jiang Yiyuan (Chinese: 蒋亦元; November 17, 1928 – February 24, 2020) was a Chinese agricultural engineer and academician of the Chinese Academy of Engineering (CAE). He was a member of the Chinese Society for Agricultural Machinery and Chinese Society of Agricultural Engineering.

== Biography ==
Jiang was born in Changzhou, Jiangsu, on November 17, 1928. His father was a merchant. He attended Zhengheng High School (正衡中学). In 1946 he enrolled at the University of Nanking, where he graduated in 1950. After university, he was hired as a teacher at Northeast Agricultural University, where he successively served as lecturer, associate professor, and professor. He joined the Chinese Communist Party in 1956. In 1957, he was sent to the Soviet Union to study at St. Petersburg National Agricultural University, studying mechanical theory under M. H. Ledoshniev. In 1982, he became a senior visiting scholar at Michigan State University. He died of illness in Harbin, Heilongjiang, on February 24, 2020, aged 91.

== Honours and awards ==
- 1997 Member of the Chinese Academy of Engineering (CAE)
