= Marvin P. Feinsmith =

American bassoonist (died 2020)

Marvin-Matis P. Feinsmith (1932/1933 – February 9, 2020), was a bassoonist from New York. He was a graduate of the Mozarteum University of Salzburg, the Juilliard School, and the Manhattan School of Music as first bassoonist with a master's degree. He studied bassoon with Simon Kovar for five years and Elias Carmen one year. He studied reed making with Harold Goltzer and Norman Herzberg and chamber music at Juilliard with Julius Baker and privately with Harold Gomberg.

== Notable experience ==
Feinsmith played principal bassoon with the Indianapolis Symphony Orchestra, the Mozarteum of Salzburg, the Brooklyn Philharmonia, co-principal with the Symphony of the Air, the Israel Philharmonic Orchestra, under Leonard Bernstein and Zubin Mehta, solo bassoon for the Bernstein “Mass”, and assistant principal bassoon with the Denver Symphony Orchestra.

He was a member of the International Double Reed Society as well as Local 802, Musicians Union, New York.

He died on February 9, 2020, at the age of 87.

== Technique ==
In respect to his esteemed teacher Simon Kovar, he passes on the Kovar system of bassoon technique, control and artistic performance. In order to teach this method, Marvin Feinsmith utilizes Simon Kovar's 24 Daily Exercises for Bassoon and Mr. Kovar's system of teaching orchestral and solo repertoire, with focus on extreme control of dynamics, tone quality, phrasing, style, intonation, and pinpoint intervallic accuracy.
