= Dino Kotopoulis =

American painter (1932–2020)

Dino Kotopoulis (October 31, 1932 – February 23, 2020) was an American artist. A retrospective of his works, Metropolis of Kotopoulis, was held through September 15, 2013 at the Leepa-Rattner Museum of Art. Kotopoulis moved to the Tampa Bay area in 1985. Kotopoulis did paintings and 3-dimensional work. He is known for his humorous caricature drawings and sculptures. He worked the drawings into finished paintings as well as sculptures in wood and metal.

Kotopoulis was born in Brooklyn, New York to Greek immigrant parents. He attended the Pratt Institute in New York City on scholarship at the age of 8. In classes with adults he became intimidated and withdrew before later returning to the school before and after serving as a medic in the U.S. Marine Corps. Kotopoulis died peacefully after a brief period of hospice care in Safety Harbour, Florida.

Kotopoulis did graphic design and animation work for advertising firms in New York, Chicago and Los Angeles for more than 20 years, including for StarKist's "Charlie the Tuna" brand {created by Tom Rogers of the Leo Burnett Agency} for which he won a coveted Clio award. Then he started his own animation company, producing contract work for Disney, Universal Studios, Hanna Barbera Cartoons and Depati-Freeland.

In 1985, he moved to Safety Harbor, Florida to take care of his mother. He opened a studio and produced oversized metal yard art. He also made his "Egos", stylized human forms worked into chairs and headboards. Much of his work is commission based. He has also lived and worked on the eastern shore of Mobile Bay, namely Fairhope, Alabama and also Ocean Springs, Mississippi.
