= Jana Vápenková =

Czech volleyball player (1947–2020)

Personal information
- Nationality: Czech
- Born: 14 May 1947; Děčín, Czechoslovakia
- Died: 3 February 2020 (aged 72)

Sport
- Sport: Volleyball

Jana Vápenková (14 May 1947 – 3 February 2020) was a Czech volleyball player. She competed in the women's tournament at the 1972 Summer Olympics.
