= Valery Reinhold =

Russian footballer (1942–2020)

Personal information
- Full name: Valery Leonidovich Reinhold
- Date of birth: 18 February 1942
- Place of birth: Moscow, Soviet Union
- Date of death: 11 February 2020 (aged 77)
- Place of death: Moscow, Russia
- Height: 1.68 m (5 ft 6 in)
- Position: Striker

Youth career
- Spartak Moscow

Senior career*
Years	Team	Apps	(Gls)
1960–1967	Spartak Moscow	176	(32)
1968–1969	Trud Voronezh	55	(7)
1970–1974	Shinnik Yaroslavl	147	(30)
- * Club domestic league appearances and goals

Valery Leonidovich Reinhold (Russian: Валерий Леонидович Рейнгольд; 18 February 1942 – 11 February 2020) was a Soviet footballer who played as a striker in the 1960s and 1970s.

== Career ==
Born in Moscow, Reinhold began playing youth football with Spartak Moscow. He joined Spartak's senior side and made his professional debut in the Soviet Top League during 1960. Reinhold would win the 1962 Soviet Top League and the 1963 and 1965 Soviet Cups with Spartak. Reinhold scored 32 goals in 176 league appearances for Spartak before finishing his career with spells at Trud Voronezh and Shinnik Yaroslavl.

Reinhold died in Moscow at age 77.
