= Hector (French singer) =

French singer (1946–2020)

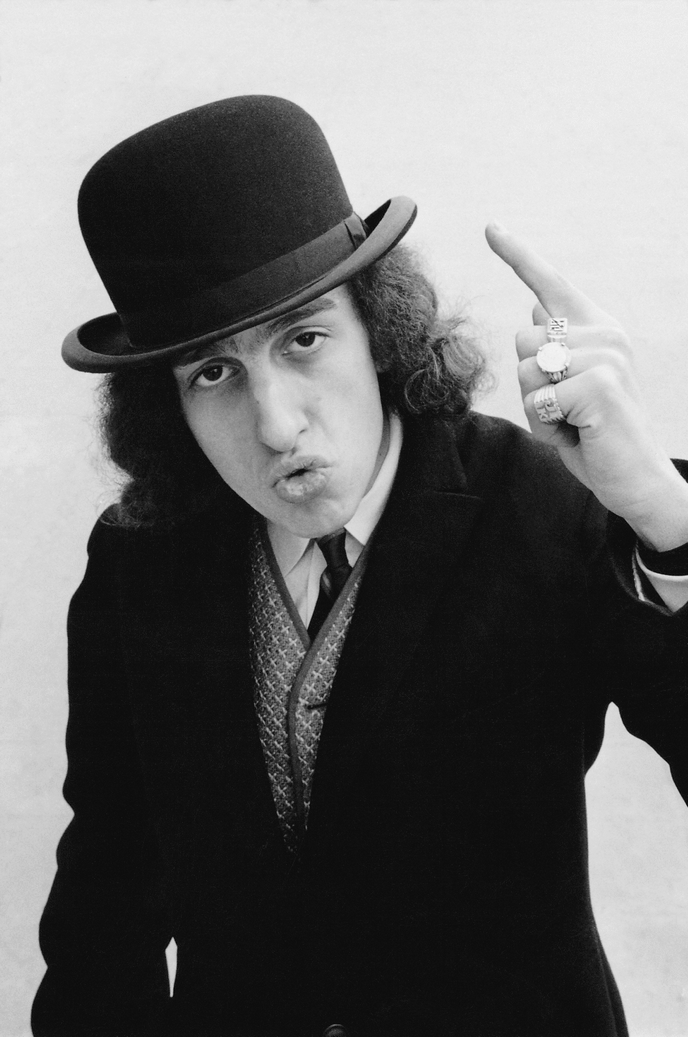
- Born: Jean-Pierre Kalfon; 20 October 1946; Paris, France
- Died: 19 February 2020 (aged 73)
- Occupation: Singer
- Years active: 1963–2006

Jean-Pierre Kalfon, known professionally as Hector (20 October 1946 – 19 February 2020) was a French singer.

== Biography ==
Hector started his career with a group called les Médiators. He separated from this group in 1964 and began his solo career. Hector wrote many of his songs alongside Jean Yanne and Gérard Sire. He also adapted many songs by Screamin' Jay Hawkins. Jacques Dutronc paid tribute to him in Salut les copains.

Hector died from cancer on 19 February 2020 at the age of 73.

== Discography ==
- Something Else/Tchang (instrumental)/Loin/Paris, Je t'aime...d'amour (1963)
- Peggy Sue/Whole Lotta Shakin’ Goin’ On/T’es pas du quartier/Je vous déteste (1963)
- Alligator/Mon copain Johny/La femme de ma vie/Hong Kong (1964)
- Abab l’arabe/Il faut seulement une petite fille/Le gamin couché/À la fin de la semelle (1966)
- Le petit Beaujolais/La société (1970)
- Je vous déteste/T’es pas du quartier/Tchang/Something Else/Peggy Sue/Whole Lotta Shakin’ Goin’On (1984)
- Cherchez L'Idole - Bande Originale du Film : Il Faut Saisir Sa Chance (1996)
- Pop Culture: Interviews & Reportages 1964-1970 (2003)
- Mon Copain Johny/La Femme de Ma Vie/Alligator/Hong Kong (2006)
