= Jacques Cuinières =

French photographer (1943–2020)

- Born: 1943; Le Pont-Chrétien-Chabenet, France
- Died: 8 February 2020 (aged 76–77)
- Occupations: Journalist; Photographer

Jacques Cuinières (1943 – 8 February 2020) was a French journalist and photographer. He worked for L'Aurore from 1960 to 1980, for Le Quotidien de Paris from 1980 to 1989 and for Le Figaro from 1989 to 2003.

== Works ==
- Une semaine à Colombey - Général De Gaulle (1971)
- Rudolf Noureev, les images d'une vie (2008)
