= Sun Ruyong =

Chinese biologist (1927–2020)

- 孙儒泳
- Born: June 12, 1927; Ningbo, Zhejiang, China
- Died: February 14, 2020 (aged 92); Guangzhou, Guangdong, China
- Education: Beijing Normal University; Moscow State University
- Scientific career
- Fields: Animal ecology
- Workplaces: Chinese Academy of Sciences (CAS); Beijing Normal University; South China Normal University
- Doctoral advisor: Haymob
- Other academic advisors: Wang Kunren

Chinese name
- Traditional Chinese: 孫儒泳
- Simplified Chinese: 孙儒泳
Transcriptions
Standard Mandarin
- Hanyu Pinyin: Sūn Rúyǒng

Sun Ruyong (Chinese: 孙儒泳; pinyin: Sūn Rúyǒng; 12 June 1927 – 14 February 2020) was a Chinese ecologist. He was a member of the Ecological Society of China and served as its president between November 1987 and October 1991.

== Biography ==
Sun was born in Ningbo, Zhejiang, on June 12, 1927. In September 1940, he attended the Ningbo County Private Three-One Middle School (宁波县私立三一学校). On October 27, 1940, the Japanese Unit 731 dropped a bacterial bomb on the downtown area of Ningbo, and the plague broke out suddenly, killing more than 100 people in just ten days. On April 19, 1941, the Imperial Japanese Army occupied Ningbo, and the school was forced to disband. In 1942 he was accepted to Ningbo Normal High School (宁波高中师范学校), where he met Li Pingzhi (李平之), a music teacher who had a profound impact on him. After graduation, due to the Nationalist government not recognizing his education background, he had to wait for work at home. With the help of Li Pingzhi, he then taught at Shanghai Tangshanlu School (上海唐山路小学). In 1949, he enrolled at Beijing Normal University, majoring in the Department of Biology. After graduating in 1951, he taught at the university as an assistant. He joined the Chinese Communist Party in 1952. After a year's study at Beijing Russian Institute, he was sent to study at Moscow State University, where he obtained a Candidate of Sciences degree under the supervision of Haymob. He returned to China in 1958 and continued to teach at Beijing Normal University, where he was promoted to associate professor in 1978 and to full professor in 1984. In October 1983, he led the team to Belgium for academic research. He died of myocardial infarction in Guangzhou, Guangdong, on February 14, 2020, aged 92.

== Works ==
- 动物生态学原理 [Principles of Animal Ecology] (in Chinese). Beijing: Beijing Normal University. 2019. ISBN 9787303218851.
- 基础生态学 [Foundations in Ecology] (in Chinese). Beijing: Higher Education Press. 2002. ISBN 9787040110272.
- 生物多样性的启迪 [Inspiration of Biodiversity] (in Chinese). Shanghai: Shanghai Science and Technology Education Press. 2000. ISBN 9787542822789.
- 普通生态学 [General Ecology] (in Chinese). Beijing: Yixuan Press. 2003. ISBN 9789576163678.
- 种群的科学管理与数学模型 动物的盛衰兴亡 [Scientific Management and Mathematical Model of Population: Rise and Fall of Animals] (in Chinese). Beijing: Shuxin Press. 1989. ISBN 9789575310172.

== Translations ==
- Ricklefs E. Rickiet (2004). The Ecology of Nature (in Chinese). Beijing: Higher Education Press. ISBN 9787040121957.
- Mackenzie A. (2004). Ecology (in Chinese). Beijing: Science Press. ISBN 9787030142788.

== Honors and awards ==
- 1993 Member of the Chinese Academy of Sciences (CAS)

Academic offices
| Preceded by Ma Shijun | President of the Ecological Society of China; 1987–1991 | Succeeded by Chen Changdu |
