= Syed Imtiaz Ahmed =

Indian cricketer (1954–2020)

Personal information
- Full name: Syed Imtiaz Ahmed
- Born: 27 April 1954
- Died: 14 February 2020 (aged 65)
- Source: Cricinfo, 30 March 2020

Syed Imtiaz Ahmed (27 April 1954 – 14 February 2020) was an Indian cricketer. He played in thirteen first-class matches for Karnataka from 1973 to 1980.
