= Thrinimong Sangtam =

Indian academic and politician (1937–2020)

Nagaland Legislative Assembly
- In office 1987–1989
- Preceded by: S. K. Sangtam
- Succeeded by: Horangse Sangtam
- Constituency: Longkhim Chare

Personal details
- Born: 1937 Alisopur, Tuensang, Assam, British India
- Died: 14 February 2020 (aged 83) Tuensang, Nagaland, India

Thrinimong Sangtam (1937 – 14 February 2020) was an Indian academic and politician from Nagaland. He was a member of the Nagaland Legislative Assembly. He also served as a member of the Nagaland Public Service Commission.

== Early life and education ==
Sangtam was born in 1937 at Alisopur village in Tuensang. He received a Bachelor of Theology degree from Eastern Theological College, Jorhat and Bachelor of Divinity degree from Serampore College. Later, he received a Master of Sacred Theology degree from Yale University.

== Career ==
Sangtam worked as a lecturer at Eastern Theological College, Jorhat from 1966 to 1976. Later, he served as a member of the Tuensang Regional Council from 1969 to 1972. He served as a member of the Nagaland Public Service Commission from 9 May 1980 to 8 May 1986. He then entered politics and was elected as a member of the Nagaland Legislative Assembly from Longkhim Chare in 1987 as an independent candidate.

== Death ==
Sangtam died at his own residence in Tuensang on 14 February 2020 at the age of 83.
