= Mahima Silwal =

Nepalese actress (died 2020)

- Born: 1 January; Kathmandu, Nepal
- Died: 12 February 2020; Gajuri, Dhading
- Resting place: Kathmandu, Nepal
- Occupations: Actress, model

Mahima Silwal (Nepali: महिमा सिलवाल) was a Nepalese actress. She appeared in numerous music videos, television commercials, print ads and half a dozen Nepali movies. She started off her career featuring in music videos. She made her acting debut in the movie Karbahi.

== Filmography ==
=== Actress ===
list as of 2016.

Films
Year	Film	Role	Notes
	Karbahi		
2013	April Fool		
2014	Cheers		
2014	Daanav		
2014	Dhunge Yug - Manav savyata ko bikash		
2015	No Smoking		
2016	Ekseeka		
