= Bob Daimond =

British civil engineer (1946–2020)

Robert Brian Daimond FICE, FCIHT
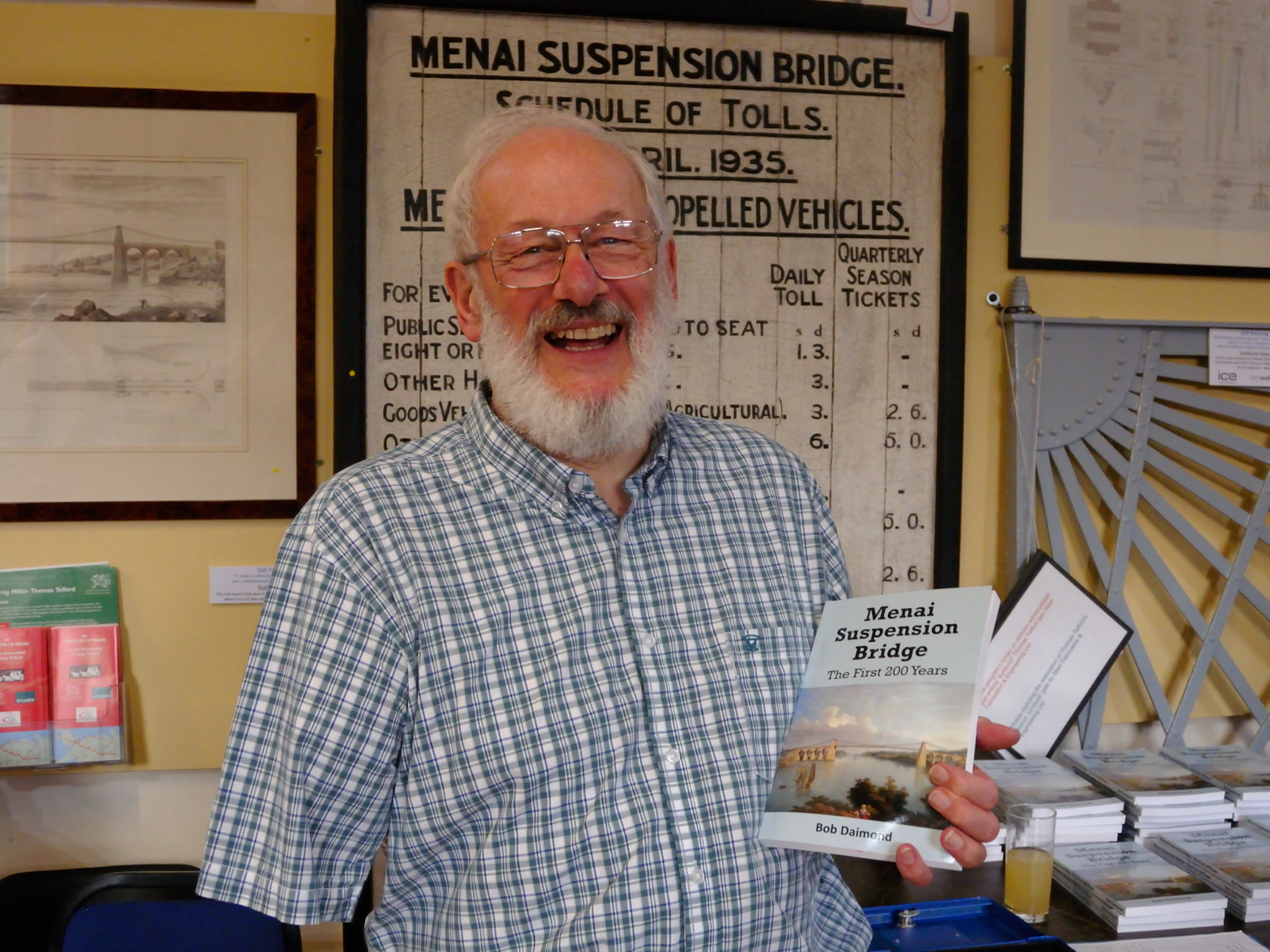
- Bob Daimond
- Born: May 1946; Kent, England
- Died: 19 February 2020 (aged 73); Llansadwrn, Anglesey, Wales
- Citizenship: British
- Engineering career
- Discipline: Civil
- Institutions: Institution of Civil Engineers, Chartered Institution of Highways and Transportation

Robert Brian Daimond (1 May 1946 – 19 February 2020) was a British civil engineer best known for his knowledge of and contributions to the history of civil engineering, particularly the works of Thomas Telford and the bridges over the Menai Strait in North Wales.

== Career ==
Daimond was born in Kent and brought up in Wolverhampton, Staffordshire. After studying civil engineering at the University of Dundee, he worked for Staffordshire County Council for six years before moving to North Wales to work for Gwynedd County Council as a county surveyor. Appointed director of highways in 1992, he retired in 2003. He was the North Wales branch chair of the Institution of Civil Engineers (ICE) in 2000 and chair of the North Wales branch of the Chartered Institution of Highways and Transportation from 1994 to 1996.

After retirement, Daimond pursued his interests in the historical study of civil engineering by being the North Wales contact for the ICE's Panel for Historical Engineering Works. He also became a trustee of the Menai Bridge Community Heritage Trust in 2005 and was instrumental in setting up the Menai Heritage Bridges Exhibition in Menai Bridge, Anglesey. He became chair of the trust and later the treasurer.

During his time with the trust, Daimond used his knowledge of the Menai Strait bridges and their designers Thomas Telford and Robert Stephenson to develop guided tours of the bridges and school workshops about bridges and engineering. He published a self-guided tour in book form as A Walking Guide to the Menai Strait Bridges. He later published a comprehensive book about the history of the building and reconstruction of the Menai Suspension Bridge, Menai Suspension Bridge – The First 200 Years.

After moving to Wales Daimond became fluent in Welsh and was inducted into the Gorsedd of the Bards at the 2017 National Eisteddfod of Wales at Bodedern, Anglesey. He was frequently interviewed on radio and television about the bridges and engineering in both English and Welsh.
