= Léon Wurmser =

American psychoanalyst (1931–2020)

- Born: 31 January 1931; Zürich, Switzerland
- Died: 15 February 2020 (aged 89)
- Occupations: Psychiatrist, Psychoananlyst

Léon Wurmser (German: [ˈvʊrmzər]; 31 January 1931 – 15 February 2020) was a Swiss psychoanalyst, clinical professor of psychiatry at West Virginia University, and a training and supervising analyst of the New York Freudian Society. He was formerly professor of psychiatry, and director of the Alcohol and Drug Abuse Program at University of Maryland, Baltimore.

== Career ==
Wurmser was born in Zürich. He was the author of more than 350 scientific papers, 15 books, and several book chapters and essays. His works deal with issues of masochism and depression, focusing on problems of shame, guilt, resentment, and the "archaic superego," both in the individual and in culture, religion, and history. Wurmser has written papers and one book on Judaism: The World of Ideas and Values of Judaism: A Psychoanalytic View (published in German). He also dealt with the understanding and treatment of drug addicts, drawing on his experience running drug rehabilitation programs for addicts. In recent years, he has published several papers and one book on jealousy and envy, in partnership with German psychoananalyst Dr. Heidrun Jarass.

His approach to psychoanalysis was Freudian. His major works, published in English and German, include The Mask Of Shame (ISBN 978-0801825279), published in 1981 and frequently reprinted; "The Hidden Dimension: Psychodynamics of Compulsive Drug Use " (1978, ISBN 978-0876683088) on the psychodynamics of drug addiction; The Power of the Inner Judge (2000, ISBN 978-0765701770); and Torment Me, But Don't Abandon Me: Psychoanalysis of the Severe Neuroses in a New Key (2007, ISBN 978-0765704702).

In 2004, Wurmser was awarded the Journal of the American Psychoanalytic Association's Journal Prize for a paper titled Psychoanalytic Reflections on 9/11, Terrorism and Genocidal Prejudice: Roots and Sequels.

He resided in Towson, Maryland, where he maintained a private practice. He supervised colleagues in the United States and in Europe in psychoanalysis and psychotherapy. He lectured in Europe and was an honorary member of a number of psychoanalytic societies in Germany and in Austria.

He died on 15 February 2020, at the age of 89.

== Books ==
- Wurmser, L. "The Power of the Inner Judge: Psychodynamic Treatment of the Severe Neuroses." New York, J. Aronson, 2000
- Wurmser, Leon. "Das Rätsel des Masochismus." Berlin: Springer, 1993
- Wurmser, Leon. "Raubmörder and Räuber: Kriminalistik." 1959
- Wurmser, Leon. "The Hidden Dimension: Psychodynamics in Compulsive Drug Use." New York: J. Aronson, 1978, republished 1995. (English and German eds. cited by 81 articles on Web of Science)
- Wurmser, Leon, co-editor with G. Balis et al. "Psychiatric Foundations of Medicine." Volumes I–VI, Butterworth, 1978
- Wurmser, Leon. "The Mask of Shame." Johns Hopkins Press, 1981, republished 1994, Jason Aronson
  - translated into German as "Die Maske der Scham" Berlin: Springer, 1990) (English and German eds. cited by 271 articles on Web of Science)
- Wurmser, Leon. "Flucht vor dem Gewissen" –– Analyse von Über-Ich und Abwehr bei schweren Neurosen, Springer-Verlag, Heidelberg, 1987, 1993, V & R 2000
- Wurmser, Leon. "Die zerbrochene Wirklichkeit –– Psychoanalyse als das Studium von Konflikt und Komplementarität" Springer Verlag, Heidelberg, 1989, 1993, V & R 2001/2002
- Wurmser, Leon. "Die Maske der Scham" (translated, revised and enlarged version of Mask of Shame, 1981) Springer Verlag, Heidelberg, March, 1990, 1993, 1997
- Wurmser, Leon. "Das Rätsel des Masochismus" 1993, Springer-Verlag Die verborgene Dimension: 1997 Vandenhoeck & Ruprecht.
- Wurmser, Leon. "The Hidden Dimension"
- Wurmser, Leon. "Magische Verwandlung und tragische Verwandlung. Die Behandlung der schweren Neurose." Vandenhoeck & Ruprecht, 1999
- Wurmser, Leon. "Die eigenen verborgensten Dunkelgänge." Mit Fr. H. Gidion. Vandenhoeck & Ruprecht, 1999
- Wurmser, Leon. "The Power of the Inner Judge." Jason Aronson, 2000
- Wurmser, Leon. "Flight from Conscience" (unpublished)
- Wurmser, Leon. "Ideen- und Wertewelt des Judentums. Eine psychoanalytische Sicht." Vandenhoeck & Ruprecht, 2001
- Wurmser, Leon. "Torment me, but do not abandon me." 2007, Rowman & Littlefield
- Wurmser, Leon and Heidrun Jarass: "Jealousy and Envy –– New Views about Two Powerful Feelings." Monograph, Psychoanalytic Inquiry, Francis & Taylor, 2007
- Wurmser, Leon. "Scham und der böse Blick." Kohlhammer, 2011
- Wurmser, Leon, ed. "Psychoanalytic Inquiry: Superego Revisited – Relevant or Irrelevant." 2004

Wurmser, Leon, Jarass, Heidrun, ed., "Nothing Good is Allowed to Stand - An Integrative View of the Negative Therapeutic Reaction." Routledge, 2013

== Selected journal articles ==
- Wurmser, L. "A defense of the use of metaphor in analytic theory formation" Psychoanalytic Quarterly, 46:466-498. (1977)
- Wurmser, L. Psychoanalytic Considerations of the Etiology of Compulsive Drug... J. Amer. Psychoanal. Association, 22:820-843. (1974) (cited by 125 articles on Web of Science)
- Wurmser, Leon "Abyss Calls Out to Abyss": Oedipal Shame, Invisibility, and Broken Identity" The American Journal of Psychoanalysis 63:4 (Dec. 2003.)
- Wurmser, Leon. "Flight from conscience: experiences with the psychoanalytic treatment of compulsive drug users." Journal of Substance Abuse Treatment 4:157-168. (2001)
