= Eugeniusz Kabatc =

Polish writer and translator (1930–2020)

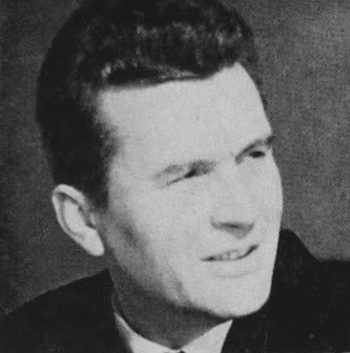
Eugeniusz Kabatc before 1966

Eugeniusz Kabatc (11 January 1930, Volkovysk – 18 February 2020) was a Polish writer and translator of Soviet literature and Italian literature.

During World War II, he attended elementary school in his native village. In 1946, during the so-called repatriation action, he came with his parents to Kwidzyn, where he graduated from high school. At that time, started in OMTUR. In 1948, after graduating he went to study in Warsaw. In 1952, he graduated from the School of Planning and Statistics there. He belonged to the ZMP. From 1949-1957 he worked in the Commercial Bank and the Ministry of Finance.

He made his debut in 1949, with a story in the weekly "Total". In 1953 he became a member of the Youth for ZLP, and from 1959 he was a member of the ZLP. In the years 1960-1968 he was editor of the biweekly "Present". In 1965 he became a member of the Polish Communist Party. In the years 1968-1974 he was adviser for cultural affairs of the Polish embassy in Rome. Beginning in 1973 he was the deputy editor of the monthly magazine "World Literature". In 1975 he became a member of the Association of European Culture (SEC). In 1980 he received the medal TPPR "For contributions to the development of Cultural Cooperation communist USSR." In 1990 he became a member of the Polish PEN Club.

He was awarded the Gold Cross of Merit (1965), Knight's Cross (1981) and the Officer's Cross of the Order of Polish Rebirth (1982).

== Works ==
- Drunken Angel
- Too Much Sun
- Affair
- Bitter Beach
- Adventure with Agnes
- The Eleventh Commandment
- Ploughing the Sea
- Turtles
- Resting in the Tall Grass
- Philip and Dżulietta
- Abduction Dżulietty
- Patrycja That is About Love and Art in the Middle of the Night
- Motorway Sun
- Margaret, that is a Requiem for the Warrior
- The death of a worker at the hotel "Savoy"
- Neutral zone - co-written with Alexander Minkowski
