= Zhou Tonghui =

Chinese analytical chemist (1924–2020)

- 周同惠
- Born: November 8, 1924; Beijing, China
- Died: February 23, 2020 (aged 95); Beijing, China
- Education: Peking University; University of Washington
- Scientific career
- Fields: Analytical chemistry
- Workplaces: Chinese Academy of Medical Sciences
- Doctoral advisor: Robinson

Zhou Tonghui (Chinese: 周同惠; pinyin: Zhōu Tónghuì; November 8, 1924 – February 23, 2020) was a Chinese analytical chemist and academician of the Chinese Academy of Sciences (CAS).

== Biography ==
Zhou was born in Beijing, on November 8, 1924, while his ancestral home was in Guilin, Guangxi. He attended Pingmin Primary School Affiliated Beiping Normal University. He elementary studied at the Middle School affiliated to Beiping Normal University and secondary studied at the High school affiliated to Chinese-France University. In 1944 he graduated from Peking University. After graduation, he taught at the university. In 1948, he went to the United States to study at the University of Washington, where he earned his Master of Science degree and Doctor of Philosophy degree under the supervision of Robinson. From 1952 to 1953 he was an assistant professor at the Department of chemistry, University of Kansas. In the summer of 1953, he joined the Burroughs Wekkcomeco as a researcher.

In 1954, Zhou and other students jointly wrote letters to the then President of the United States Dwight D. Eisenhower and the then Secretary-General of the United Nations Dag Hammarskjöld, requesting to return to China. In 1955, he and other students jointly wrote to Premier Zhou Enlai, who was then meeting in Geneva, asking the Chinese government to come forward and negotiate with the U.S. government. Finally, the U.S. government agreed to let Chinese students leave the United States on the condition of returning American prisoners of the Korean War. In June 1955, he left the United States by boat and returned to Beijing in July. In September of the same year, he was assigned to the Department of Pharmacology of National Health Research Institute (now Chinese Academy of Medical Sciences) as an associate researcher. He joined the Chinese Communist Party in 1986.

He died of illness at Beijing Friendship Hospital, on February 23, 2020, aged 95.

== Honours and awards ==
- 1991 State Science and Technology Progress Award (First Class)
- 1991 Member of the Chinese Academy of Sciences (CAS)
