= Colonel Dinar =

Chadian comedian (1987–2020)

- Born: 1987; N'Djamena, Chad
- Died: 18 February 2020 (aged 33); Kousséri, Cameroon
- Occupation: Comedian

Colonel Dinar (stage name of Abdelsalam Mahamat) (1987 – 18 February 2020) was a Chadian comedian.

== Biography ==
The second-born child in his family, Dinar left school after he discovered his talent in comedy. He began practicing theater and participated in his first production in 2008. His first major on-stage performance took place at the Institut français du Tchad in 2012. He then took up comedy shows, with acts such as Africa stand up and Parlement du rire. He often played the caricature of a nationalist colonel.

On 18 February 2020, Colonel Dinar was stabbed to death in the head and chest in a mugging while returning to Chad from a show in Cameroon by two men attempting to steal his cell phone. His funeral was on 19 February 2020 at the Cimetière de Lamadji in N'Djamena.
