= John Bevan (diver) =

British Underwater diving expert

Dr. John Bevan (19 December 1943 — 3 February 2020) was a British pioneer in the science of underwater diving. He wrote the Professional Diver's Handbook, and the non-fiction narrative book The First Treasure Divers.

A member of the Royal Naval Scientific Service, Bevan was a founding member of the Historical Diving Society, and a prominent member of the Society for Underwater Technology. He received a doctorate in the field of diving equipment. He died in 2020.
