= Frank Nowacki =

British architect (1947–2020)

Francis Joseph (Frank) Nowacki FRIBA (17 May 1947 – 24 February 2020) was a 20th/21st-century British architect who is remembered for his major project work in Dubai. He was Director of John R. Harris Partners (JRHP) Architects (the company earlier responsible for Dubai World Trade Centre).

== Life ==
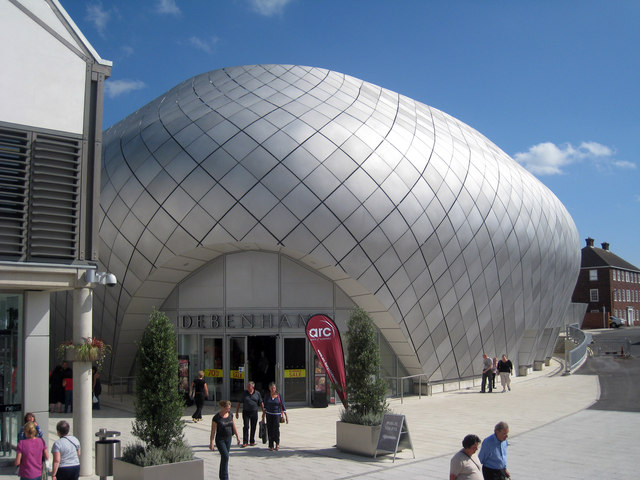
Arc Shopping Centre, Bury St Edmunds

Frank Nowacki was born on 17 May 1947 in Doncaster, England. He was educated there at St Peters Roman Catholic High School, from 1958 to 1964. After initially studying engineering, a role as a site manager inspired him to study architecture, and he studied at Edinburgh College of Art graduating BA DipArch in 1975. He then settled in Edinburgh for the next 25 years.

Following qualification in 1975 he joined Douglas Abrahams and Partners, where he won a commendation for his design for a Beatles Museum in Liverpool. He later moved to Walter Wood Associates (WWA).

Until 2000 when Nowacki moved to Dubai, he lived at 99 East Claremont Street in the eastern New Town of Edinburgh.

In 2015, JRHP was taken over by the London-based architects, Aukett Swanke.

Nowacki died of motor neuron disease on 24 February 2020. He was cremated at the Lorimer Chapel in Warriston Crematorium on 6 March 2020.

== Family ==
Frank) Nowacki was married twice. From his first marriage, he had a son, Simon Nowacki.

In 1997, Nowacki married Lesley who had two children by a previous marriage: Chris and Jenny.

== Principal works ==
Nowacki was involved with the following:

- TFG Tower
- Marix Tower
- Bulgari Hotel Dubai
- Various buildings at Dubai Sports City
- Sharjah English School
- Dubai Community Arts Centre
- Mall of the Emirates
- Retail element at Dubai Festival City
- Wafi Shopping Mall
- UK Pavilion, Expo 2020, Dubai
- The Arc, Bury St Edmunds
- Yas Mall Hotel
- Mercedes-Benz World, Dubai
- Radisson Blu Hotel, Dubai
- Sheikh Zayed Learning Centre
- Fontenay Hotel, Hamburg
- International City Mall, Dubai
