= Roger Fieldhouse =

British historian and academic (1940–2020)

Roger Fieldhouse (1940–2020) was a British historian and academic. He was Professor of Adult Education at the University of Exeter between 1986 and 1996.

Fieldhouse was born in East Sheen to Ernest Fieldhouse, a commercial traveller, and Phyllis, née Scott. He studied at history at the University of Reading between 1960 and 1963. In the mid-1960s, he became a tutor-organiser for the Workers' Educational Association in North Yorkshire; there he worked with local people to explore the area's history. In 1970, he was appointed to the department of adult education and extramural studies at the University of Leeds, and later secured promotion to a senior lectureship and to be head of department. He studied part-time for a doctorate at Leeds; his PhD was awarded in 1984 for his thesis "The ideology of English responsible body adult education 1925–1950". In 1986, he moved to the University of Exeter to take up the chair in adult education; he remained there until he retired in 1996.

In the view of the historian Richard Taylor, Fieldhouse's work had "contributed significantly to two academic fields: local history; and the history and philosophy of modern British adult education". In the former vein, he authored A History of Swaledale and Richmond (1978); in the latter, he authored A History of Modern British Adult Education (1996). He also wrote Anti-apartheid: A History of the Movement in Britain (2005) and, with Taylor, co-edited E. P. Thompson and English Radicalism (2013).
