= Edwin Barbosa =

Brazilian musical artist (c. 1969–2020)

- Birth name: Edwin Barbosa
- Born: c. 1969
- Died: February 5, 2020; Rio de Janeiro, Brazil
- Genres: MPB, Frevo
- Occupation: Musician
- Instrument(s): Drums, percussion

Edwin Barbosa (c. 1969 – February 5, 2020), also known as Edwin de Olinda, was a Brazilian percussionist for Alceu Valença.

== Career ==
Barbosa was known for exploring nagô, maracatu, and caboclinho, along with other percussion rhythms. He entered Valença's band in 1988, where he remained for 26 years. Valença made a tribute song to Barbosa while he was alive, titled Quando Edwin desde a ladeira. He was also present at solo works along with partner Stanley Jordan and at the Perc Pan festival, playing with Naná Vasconcelos, Gilberto Gil, and Carlinhos Brown. In 2013, he was given the Troféu Luiz Gonzaga, granted by the Câmara Municipal de Olinda, for "his relevant role in the enlargement of the Northeast music and culture." He also ran for state deputy for Pernambuco in 2010.

== Death ==
Barbosa suffered from a severe form of diabetes and was being treated for hospital bacteria and other illnesses. He performed hemodialysis daily at the Hospital Miguel Couto in Rio de Janeiro and died there, aged 51. His body was flown to Recife on February 8, 2020. The Câmara Municipal de Olinda decreed three days of mourning as a tribute to the percussionist. His body was first shown in the town hall of Olinda, then driven to the Cemitério do Guadalupe and buried there.

== Lawsuit against Alceu Valença ==
His son, Edwin Santos, published on Instagram that Barbosa died without his rights to retirement because he was not recognized for his role in Valença's band. Since 2014, there has been an ongoing lawsuit about the matter.
