= Anthony C. Maiola =

American politician

Member of the New Hampshire House of Representatives from the Sullivan 2nd district
- In office 2008–2009

Personal details
- Born: August 8, 1923 Claremont, New Hampshire, U.S.
- Died: February 25, 2020 (aged 96)
- Party: Republican

Anthony C. Maiola (August 8, 1923 – February 25, 2020) was an American politician. He served as a Republican member for the Sullivan 2nd district of the New Hampshire House of Representatives.

== Life and career ==
Maiola was born in Claremont, New Hampshire. He served in the United States Marine Corps during World War II.

Maiola was a commissioner of the New Hampshire Liquor Commission for 18 years.

Maiola served in the New Hampshire House of Representatives from 2008 to 2009.

Maiola died on February 25, 2020, at the age of 96.
