= T. Tali =

Indian politician (c.1943–2020)

Nagaland Legislative Assembly
- In office 1977–1982
- Preceded by: I. Merachiba
- Succeeded by: I. Merachiba
- Constituency: Tuli
- In office 1987–1989
- Preceded by: I. Merachiba
- Succeeded by: Tsuknungpenzu
- Constituency: Tuli
- In office 1993–2008
- Preceded by: Tsuknungpenzu
- Succeeded by: L. Temjen Jamir
- Constituency: Tuli

Personal details
- Born: c. 1943
- Died: 12 February 2020 (aged 77)

T. Tali (c. 1943 – 12 February 2020) was an Indian politician from Nagaland. He was a member of the Nagaland Legislative Assembly and a minister of the Government of Nagaland.

== Biography ==
Tali was elected as a member of the Nagaland Legislative Assembly from Tuli in 1977, 1987, 1993, 1998 and 2003. He also served as a minister of the Government of Nagaland.

Tali died on 12 February 2020 at the age of 77.
