= Jean Faggion =

French sports shooter (1931–2020)

Personal information
- Born: 28 September 1931
- Died: 4 February 2020 (aged 88)

Sport
- Sport: Sports shooting

Jean Faggion (28 September 1931 – 4 February 2020) was a French sports shooter. He competed at the 1972 Summer Olympics and the 1976 Summer Olympics.
