= Paul Goldstene =

American political scientist (1930–2020)

- Born: Paul N. Goldstene; November 23, 1930
- Died: February 3, 2020 (aged 89)
- Education: University of Arizona (PhD)
- Occupation: Political scientist
- Scientific career
- Fields: Political science

Paul N. Goldstene (November 23, 1930 – February 3, 2020), was a professor of the Government department at Sacramento State University, and was an acclaimed author and teacher of political theory. He was the author of numerous essays, reviews, and books. Goldstene was raised in New York City and was a graduate of the University of Arizona, where he received his PhD with a doctoral dissertation on John Kenneth Galbraith in 1970.

"Goldstene teaches contemporary political thought and theory at California State University, Sacramento, where he received the Outstanding Scholarly Achievement Award in 1995. He is the author of The Collapse of Liberal Empire, Yale University Press (1997), Chandler & Sharp (1980); Democracy in America: Sardonic Speculations, Bucknell House (1988); The Bittersweet Century, Chandler & Sharp (1989); as well as numerous articles and reviews for scholarly publications."
