= Germaine Poliakov =

French musician (1918–2020)

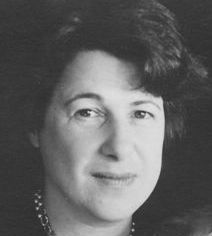
- Germain Poliakov in 1961
- Born: Germaine Rousso; 15 December 1918; Constantinople, Ottoman Empire
- Died: 19 February 2020 (aged 101); Massy, France
- Occupation: Music instructor

Germaine Poliakov (15 December 1918 — 19 February 2020) was an Ottoman-born French music teacher and Holocaust survivor.

== Biography ==
Poliakov was born Germaine Rousso in 1918 in present-day Istanbul, but emigrated to France with her parents at the age of two. She went into hiding from the Gestapo in Beaulieu-sur-Dordogne, and worked as a teacher for a hidden colony of Jewish children. She gave birth to three children in 1942, 1943, and 1944.

After the war, Germaine married the historian Léon Poliakov in 1947, with whom she bore a son in 1960. She founded the Chorale Accord in Massy in 1960. Léon died in 1997.

Poliakov died on 19 February 2020 at the age of 101.

== Works ==
- Initiation à la lecture mélodique : une nouvelle approche du solfège (1979)
- Psaume 92 (v. 13-16) : liturgie hébraïque [pour chœur à 4 voix mixtes (1979)
- Chanter d'abord : solfège, initiation débutants : livre du maître (1984)
- Chanter d'abord : solfège, initiation débutants : livre de l'élève (1984)

== Honors ==
- Knight of the Legion of Honour (2012)
