= John Renton =

American geologist (1933–2020)

John J. "Jack" Renton (1933 – February 28, 2020) was a professor of geology at West Virginia University, known for the quality of the teaching in his introductory geology courses and in the video version of the course, Nature of Earth. In 2001 he received the WVU Eberly College of Arts & Sciences Outstanding Teacher Award, the WVU Foundation Outstanding Teaching Award, and was named “West Virginia Professor of the Year” by the Carnegie Foundation for the Advancement of Teaching and the Council for Advancement and Support of Education. In 2002, he was named an Eberly Family Professor for Distinguished Teaching, one of only four at the University.

== Education ==
Renton earned a B.S. in Chemistry from Waynesburg College in 1956, and his M.S. in Geology from West Virginia University in 1959. From 1960 to 1963 he served as an R&D Officer in the U.S. Air Force Solid State Physics Group at Wright Patterson AFB, before returning to WVU to complete his Ph.D. in 1965.

== Academic career ==
He taught at WVU from 1965 until his retirement in May 2015, reaching approximately 35,000 students during 100 semesters prior. His research specializations are coal geology and geochemistry. His scholarly contributions have been in geochemistry, coal geology, X-Ray diffractometry, and clay mineralogy. Throughout his career, he published ~70 papers and managed almost $5 million in research funding. Many of his scientific contributions came while he headed the West Virginia Geological & Economic Survey Analytical Section concurrent with his WVU appointment from 1965 to 1992. Renton established the John and Eleanor Renton Geology Field Camp Scholarship to help students attend summer geology field camp, an experience he felt has a long-term impact on their education and future career. Renton used The Research Repository @ WVU to make teaching materials and his hand-drawn illustrations, a culmination of over 50 years of the study of Earth, freely available as an Introduction to Earth Science website.

== Nature of Earth ==
Renton has created a 36 part lecture series on DVD called Nature of Earth. Bill Gates has this program as example of the sorts of educational innovation that the Gates Foundation intends to support, calling the course "phenomenal".

== Bibliography ==
- Renton, John (1994). Physical Geology. West Publishing Company. p. 706. ISBN 978-0-314-02514-2.
- Renton, John (2005). Planet Earth (2nd ed.). Kendall/Hunt Publishing Company. p. 706. ISBN 978-0-7575-1059-5.
- Renton, John (2006). Nature of Earth: An Introduction to Geology. Vol. 1–36. The Teaching Company. ISBN 1-59803-221-6.
- Renton, John (2011). Physical Geology Across the American Landscape. Kendall/Hunt Publishing Company. p. 708. ISBN 978-0-7575-5598-5.
