= Abdul Hafeez Khan Al Yousefi =

Former Agricultural Adviser (1937–2020)

Abdul Hafeez Al Yousefi
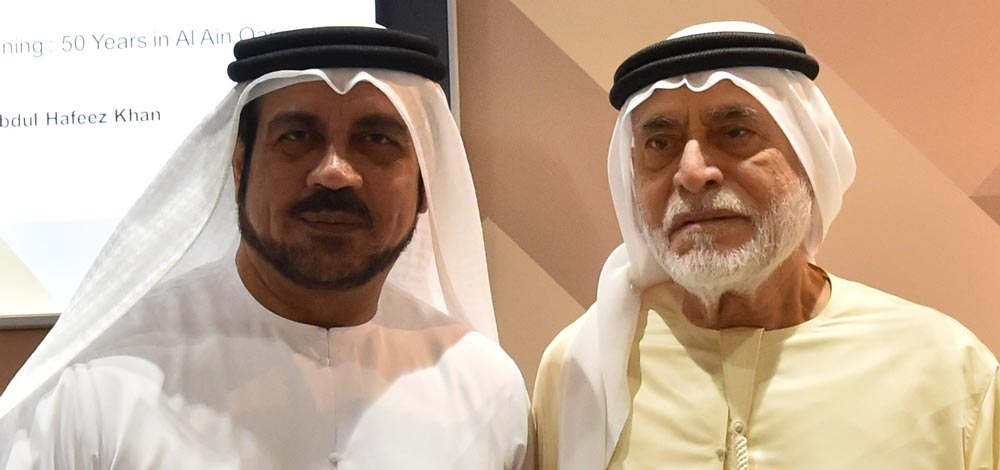
- Abdul Hafeez Al Yousefi (Right)
- Born: 1937; British India
- Died: 14 February 2020 (aged 82); Al Ain, United Arab Emirates
- Education: American University of Beirut
- Occupation: Retired Horticulturist
- Known for: Agricultural Adviser to Sheikh Zayed

Abdul Hafeez Khan Al Yousefi (Arabic: عبد الحفيظ اليوسفي; 1937 – February 14, 2020), was an Agricultural, Personal and Special Adviser to Zayed bin Sultan Al Nahyan (Founder of United Arab Emirates).

== Early life ==
Abdul Hafeez Al Yousefi was born in 1937 in British India (modern day Pakistan). Al Yousefi arrived in Abu Dhabi in 1962, after completing his studies in agricultural sciences from the American University of Beirut. Al Yousefi was invited to Abu Dhabi by the late Sheikh Zayed bin Sultan Al Nahyan, who was then serving as the Ruler's Representative in the Eastern Region.

== Education and career ==
Al Yousefi moved to Beirut where he studied for a Graduate Degree in Agricultural Sciences from the American University of Beirut.

During the same time in 1962, Sheikh Zayed, then the former Ruler's Representative for the Eastern Region of Trucial States, had turned to international diplomacy in his efforts to find someone to develop Al Ain’s agriculture. Sir Hugh Boustead, the British political agent in Abu Dhabi, contacted Dr Jack Eyre, an agriculture adviser to the Middle East development division at the British Embassy in Beirut, requesting a candidate. Eventually Al Yousefi was selected. In May 2015, Al Yousefi published his book "50 years in Al Ain Oasis", and dedicated it to Sheikh Zayed during the 2015 Abu Dhabi International Book Fair.

== Later life ==
Al Yousefi remained in the UAE after a good friendship bond was developed between him and Sheikh Zayed. He lived in his Al Ain house which was built for him by Sheikh Zayed, it was also the first proper house built in UAE.

== Death ==
Al Yousefi died in Al Ain after suffering from Leukemia for some years. He was treated at the MD Anderson Cancer Center in Houston, Texas.
