= Enrique Marin =

Spanish painter and sculptor (1935–2020)

- Born: 15 December 1935; Seville, Spain
- Died: 9 February 2020 (aged 84); Auxerre, France
- Occupation: Painter
- Website: www.enriquemarinartiste.com

Enrique Marin (15 December 1935 – 9 February 2020) was a Spanish painter and sculptor.

== Biography ==
Marin was educated at the Escuela de Artes y Oficios de Sevilla in Seville, then at the École nationale supérieure des beaux-arts in Paris, where he worked with René Jaudon, Pierre-Eugène Clairin, Jean-Eugène Bersier, and Lucien Coutaud.

Marin moved to Paris in 1958, and frequently traveled to Brittany. He then lived in Auxerre in the Burgundy region, where he owned an engraving workshop. He died in Auxerre on 9 February 2020.

== Exhibitions ==
- Galerie Anne Colin, Paris (1965, 1966, and 1971)
- Hotel Sandelin Museum, Saint-Omer (1977)
- Biblioteca Nacional de España, Madrid (1982)
- Milan Public Library, Milan (1983)
- Fundación El Monte, Seville (1995)
- Musée de la faïence, Quimper
- Beaune Museum of Fine Arts, Beaune (2003-2004)
- Musées de Sens, Sens (2010-2011)
- Abbey of Saint-Germain d'Auxerre, Auxerre (2010-2011)
- Galerie du Présidial, Quimperlé (2013)
- Centre d’Art Graphique de la Métairie Bruyère, Parly (2018)

== Works ==
- Romans et contes (1965-1966)
- Rinconete et Cortadillo; L'Illustre laveuse de vaisselle (1970)
- Platero et moi (1970)
- Discours (1980)
- Enrique Marin : cinq empreintes (1985)
- Le somnambule (1985)
- Femme à la colombe, Minotaure, Fest noz, Le lieutenant, Couple de Bretons
- Cheval cabré
