= Senaka Angulugaha =

Sri Lankan cricketer (1959–2020)

Personal information
- Full name: Kodituwakku Arachchige Prasad Senaka Angulugaha
- Born: 4 April 1959; Colombo, Sri Lanka
- Died: 2 February 2020 (aged 60)
- Source: Cricinfo, 15 April 2021

Senaka Angulugaha (4 April 1959 – 2 February 2020) was a Sri Lankan cricketer. He played in thirteen first-class matches for Sri Lanka Air Force Sports Club from 1988/89 to 1989/90. In 2019, he was appointed as the head of Sri Lanka women's cricket. He died in February 2020 from blood poisoning. Following Angulugaha's death, memorial matches were announced in his honour.
