= Sha Qinglin =

Chinese highway engineer (1930–2020)

- 沙庆林
- Born: May 7, 1930; Yixing, Jiangsu, China
- Died: February 23, 2020 (aged 89); Beijing, China
- Education: Shanghai Jiao Tong University; Moscow State Automobile Highway Institute
- Scientific career
- Fields: Highway engineering
- Workplaces: Research Institute of Highway, Ministry of Transport

Chinese name
- Traditional Chinese: 沙慶林
- Simplified Chinese: 沙庆林
Transcriptions
Standard Mandarin
- Hanyu Pinyin: Shā Qìnglín

Sha Qinglin (Chinese: 沙庆林; May 7, 1930 – February 23, 2020) was a Chinese highway engineer and academician of the Chinese Academy of Engineering (CAE).

== Biography ==
Sha was born in Yixing, Jiangsu, on May 7, 1930. He joined the Chinese Communist Party in June 1951. In 1952 he graduated from Shanghai Jiao Tong University. He obtained a Candidate of Sciences degree from Moscow State Automobile Highway Institute in 1957. After returning to China he worked in the Research Institute of Highway, Ministry of Transport. He died of illness in Beijing, on February 23, 2020, aged 89.

== Honors and awards ==
- 1995 Member of the Chinese Academy of Engineering (CAE)
