= Inesa Kozlovskaya =

Soviet Russian physiologist (1927–2020)

Inesa Benediktovna Kozlovskaya (Russian: Инеса Бенедиктовна Козловская; 2 June 1927 in Harbin – 19 February 2020) was a Soviet Russian physiologist, Corresponding Member of the Russian Academy of Sciences, and Honored Scientist of the Russian Federation (1996). She was a Doktor nauk of Medical Sciences, Professor, and was (since 1977) fellow researcher at the Institute of Biomedical Problems (IBMP). She was a laureate of the 2001 State Prize of the Russian Federation.

== Career ==
In 1954, Kozlovskaya defended her Candidate's Dissertation. From 1966 to 1971, Kozlovskaya attended Neal E. Miller's lab at Rockefeller University. In 1976, she defended her doctoral dissertation. She was elected a Corresponding Member of the Russian Academy of Sciences in 2000. She was elected a Member of the International Academy of Astronautics. She was a member of the Editorial Board for Human Physiology.
