= Michel Leplay =

French Protestant theologian (1927–2020)

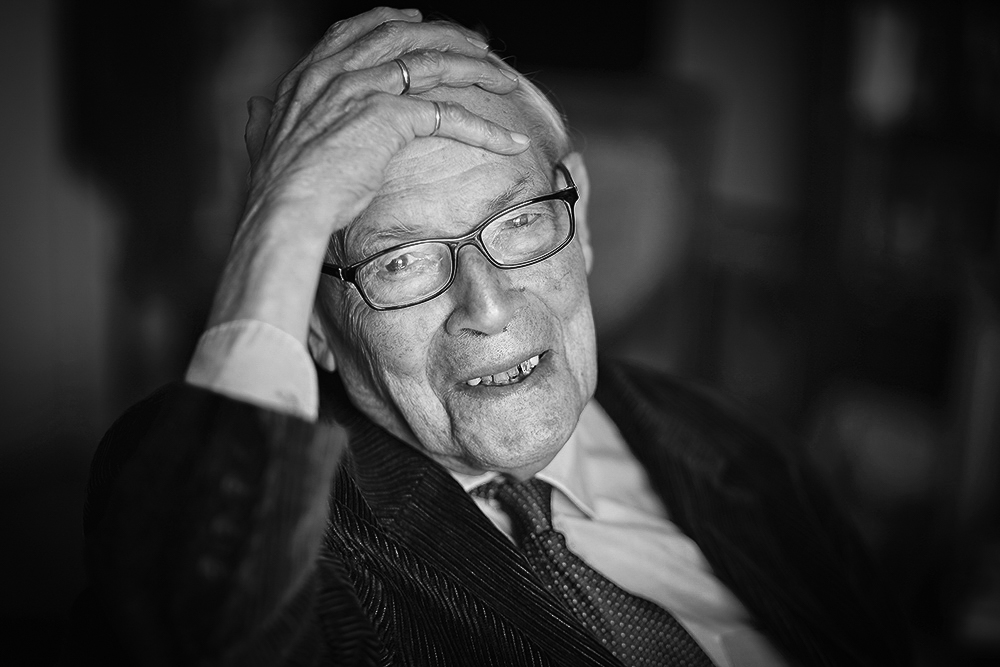
- Leplay in 2017
- Born: 22 February 1927; Le Havre, France
- Died: 26 February 2020 (aged 92–93)
- Occupation: Pastor

Michel Leplay (22 February 1927 – 26 February 2020) was a French Protestant pastor. He was the director of the weekly newspaper Réforme, and was honored with the Amitié judéo-chrétienne de France prize in 2017.

== Biography ==
The son of Norman merchants, Leplay was involved in Scouting throughout his youth, and worked with the Eclaireuses et Eclaireurs Unionistes de France. At age 15, he decided he would become a pastor.

After World War II, Leplay studied at the Protestant Faculty of Theology in Paris and the University of Lausanne. He also completed his military service at the Saumur Cavalry School.

Leplay became a pastor at the Reformed Church of France (ERF) in Monoblet, where he stayed for eight years and raised three children with his wife, Laurette. He moved to ERF Amiens and stayed there for ten years. He was President of the Conseil régional d’Île-de-France de l’ERF from 1950 to 1990, and was President of the Commission of Ministers of ERF in 1968.

Leplay was a longtime member of the Amitié judéo-chrétienne de France association, and served as Vice-President from 1992 to 2005. He was director of the weekly newspaper Réforme from 1991 to 1995.

Michel Leplay died on 26 February 2020 at the age of 92.

== Awards ==
- Prize of the Amitié judéo-chrétienne de France (2017)

== Publications ==
=== Books ===
- Foi et vie des protestants (1996)
- La religion se porte bien (1996)
- Charles Péguy (1998)
- Martin Luther (1998)
- Le Protestantisme et le pape : quelques explications (1999)
- La Racine qui te porte. L’histoire mouvementée de la lecture chrétienne de la Bible juive (1999)
- Le Protestantisme et Marie : une belle éclaircie (2000)
- La Bible entre le culte et la culture. Vingt siècles de vitalité et de résistance (2002)
- Les Protestantismes (2004)
- Les Églises protestantes et les Juifs face à l’antisémitisme au vingtième siècle (2006)
- La Foi que j’aime le mieux : une histoire de la petite espérance (2009)

=== Religious texts ===
- Du fond de ma détresse: deux psaumes de pénitence (1998)
- L'Église en péril (2000)
- Marie: un regard juif sur la mère de Jésus (2001)
- Le Chant des profondeurs (2010)
- Présence d’une parole (2015)
