= Sadhu Aliyur =

Indian painter (1963–2020)

Sadu Aliyur
- Born: 1963; Kerala, India
- Died: 20 February 2020
- Occupation: Painter

Sadhu Aliyur (സദു അലിയൂർ) (1963 – 2020) was an Indian (watercolor) painter and art teacher from Kerala, India. He has done a workshop on the art of watercolor painting at the State Gallery of Fine Arts. He co-founded "Colouring India foundation" a non profit organisation.

== Early life and career ==
He was born in the Kozhikode District of Kerala and studied fine arts at Kerala school of Arts, Thalassery. He was an Art instructor at Brushman's school of Arts. Sadhu has been honoured for his talents with awards in Kerala and outside. He has had 23 exhibitions where each time he brings a fresh look at his chosen subject and theme. The Kerala Lalith Kala Academy chose Sadhu for this year's Vijaya Raghavan Gold Medal Endowment. His art work has also been honoured by Turkey International Water Colour society for his contributions in fine art.

He died on 20 February 2020 in Ernakulam.

== Art galleries & Exhibitions ==
Sadhu has had various solo exhibitions of his works at Mayyazhi Chithranhaliloode, municipal town hall, Kannur- May 2006. The artist's work has exhibited at many solo or group art exhibitions.

=== Solo Exhibition ===
- 2001- Mahe, Chalakkara and Pandakkal
- 2006- Municipal Town Hall, Kannur
- 2006- Mary Matha Community Hall, Mahe
- 2006- Lalithakala Academy Art Gallery, Kozhikkode
- 2007- Karnataka Chithrakala Parishath art gallery, Bangalore
- 2008- Kerala Lalithakala Akademi Art Gallery, Durbar Hall, Earnakulam
- 2008- Alliance Française, Pondicherry
- 2008- Karnataka Chithrakala Parishath Art Gallery, Bangalore
- 2009- Malayala Kalagramam Art Gallery, New Mahe
- 2009- Alliance Française, Pondicherry
- 2009- Kerala Lalithakala Akademi Art Gallery, Durbar Hall, Earnakulam
- 2010- Kathirur Grama Panchayath Art Gallery, Thalassery
- 2010- Karnataka Chithrakala Parishath Art Gallery, Bangalore
- 2010- Lalit Kala Akademi Art Gallery, New Delhi
- 2011- Karnataka Chithrakala Parishath Art Gallery, Bangalore
- 2012- Mary Matha Community Hall, Mahe
- 2012- Karnataka Chithrakala Parishath Art Gallery, Bangalore
- 2013- Kerala Lalithakala Academy Art Gallery, Kozhikkode
- 2013- Sargalaya Art and Craft Village, Iringal, Vadagara
- 2013- Karnataka Chitrakala Parishth gallery, Bangalore
- 2014- Karnataka Chitrakala Parishth Gallery, Bangalore
- 2015- Soryakanthi Art Gallery, Thiruvananthapuram
- 2015- Kerala lalithakala Akademi Gallery, Thalassery
- 2015- Durbar Hall Ernakulam, Kerala
- 2015- Jahangeer art gallery, Mumbai
- 2016- Soryakanti Art Gallery, Thiruvananthapuram
- 2016- Karnataka Chitrakala Parishath gallery, Bangalore
- 2016- State Art Gallery, Hyderabad
- 2016- Wintage Art Gallery, Payyanoor
- 2016- Vadagara Block panjayath gallery
- 2017- Gudham Art gallery, Kozhikode

=== Group exhibition ===
- National Exhibition of Paintings conducted by Kerala Chithrakala Parishath at Karnataka Chithrakala Parishath Art Gallery
- Bangalore and many group shows in various parts of India.

Art workshops

"Hues of Watercolours" at Venkatappa Art Gallery. Organised by Coloring India
