= Qiu Jun (bodybuilder) =

Chinese bodybuilder (1948–2020)

- 邱钧
- Born: 1948; Wuhan, Hubei, China
- Died: 6 February 2020 (aged 71–72); Wuhan, Hubei, China
- Occupation: Bodybuilder

Chinese name
- Chinese: 邱钧
- Traditional Chinese: 邱鈞
Transcriptions
Standard Mandarin
- Hanyu Pinyin: Qiū Jūn

Qiu Jun (Chinese: 邱钧; 1948 – 6 February 2020) was a Chinese bodybuilder and a bodybuilding champion who claimed numerous prizes in the senior category. He won many national competitions and was ranked 2nd in the international bodybuilding tournament called "Olympic World Night" 2019, which took place in China.

== Career ==
Qiu Jun was born in Wuhan, China, into a family of Fuzhou origin. In 1964, after graduating from technical secondary school, Qiu, age 16, entered Wuchang Vehicle Factory, where he was responsible for railway maintenance. In 1990, he participated in the first bodybuilding competition in Hubei Province on behalf of the factory and got the fifth place in the province. Since then, he became obsessed with bodybuilding. When SARS outbreak in 2003 occurred, Qiu retired from the factory. His wife died two years later. He and his only daughter, Qiu Qi, lived together.

Qiu was a fitness enthusiast for the last two decades of his life. Ever since retiring in 2003, he participated in various bodybuilding competitions and won a lot of honors. He only began working out after his retirement, joining a gym and eventually going on to coach others and participating in bodybuilding competitions. In 2019, he took part in an international bodybuilding tournament called "Olympic World Night", where he won second place in the elderly category.

== Death ==
During the COVID-19 pandemic in mainland China, Qiu was diagnosed with COVID-19. On 6 February 2020, he died from the infection at the local Red Cross hospital.
