= Duan Zhengcheng =

Chinese engineer (1934–2020)

- 段正澄
- Born: 15 June 1934; Zhenjiang, Jiangsu, China
- Died: 15 February 2020 (aged 85); Wuhan, Hubei, China
- Education: Huazhong University of Science and Technology
- Scientific career
- Fields: Industrial engineering
- Workplaces: Huazhong University of Science and Technology

Duan Zhengcheng (Chinese: 段正澄; pinyin: Duàn Zhèngchéng; 15 June 1934 – 15 February 2020) was a Chinese industrial engineer and inventor. He specialized in machinery manufacturing and automation, was an academician of the Chinese Academy of Engineering (CAE) and served as a professor and doctoral supervisor at the Huazhong University of Science and Technology.

== Biography ==
Duan was born in Zhenjiang, Jiangsu, on 15 June 1934. After graduating from high school in 1953, he studied, then taught, at what is now Huazhong University of Science and Technology. On 15 February 2020, he died of coronavirus disease 2019 (COVID-19) in Wuhan, Hubei, aged 85.

== Contribution ==
In 1996, he invented the OUR-QGD stereotactic gamma-ray system, which won him a State Science and Technology Progress Award (Second Class) in 2005.

== Honours and awards ==
- 2003 State Science and Technology Progress Award (Second Class)
- 2005 State Science and Technology Progress Award (Second Class)
- 2008 State Science and Technology Progress Award (Second Class)
- 2009 Member of the Chinese Academy of Engineering (CAE)
