= Hong Ling (geneticist) =

Chinese biologist (1966–2020)

- 红凌
- Born: 27 November 1966; Wuhan, Hubei, China
- Died: 7 February 2020 (aged 53); Wuhan, Hubei, China
- Education: Wuhan University; University of Arizona
- Scientific career
- Fields: genetics, rare diseases
- Workplaces: University of California, Berkeley; Huazhong University of Science and Technology

Chinese name
- Chinese: 红凌
- Traditional Chinese: 紅凌
Transcriptions
Standard Mandarin
- Hanyu Pinyin: Hóng Líng

Hong Ling (Chinese: 红凌, 27 November 1966 – 7 February 2020) was a Chinese geneticist, professor and doctoral advisor at the Huazhong University of Science and Technology.

== Career ==
Hong was educated at Wuhan University, majoring in biology, where he graduated in July 1987 and obtained a bachelor's degree. In December 1994, he graduated from the University of Arizona with a doctor's degree in biochemistry. After graduation, he started his career as a biochemist at Department of Molecular & Cell Biology (MCB) of University of California, Berkeley. Since March 2007, he served as professor of molecular biology at the School of Life Science and Technology of Huazhong University of Science and Technology. He was studying major and rare human diseases using both human subjects and model organisms such as Drosophila and mouse.

== Death ==
During the COVID-19 pandemic in China, Hong contracted the coronavirus. On 7 February 2020, he died from the infection at Wuhan Union Hospital.
