= Patti Smith discography =

Cataloging of published recordings by Patti Smith

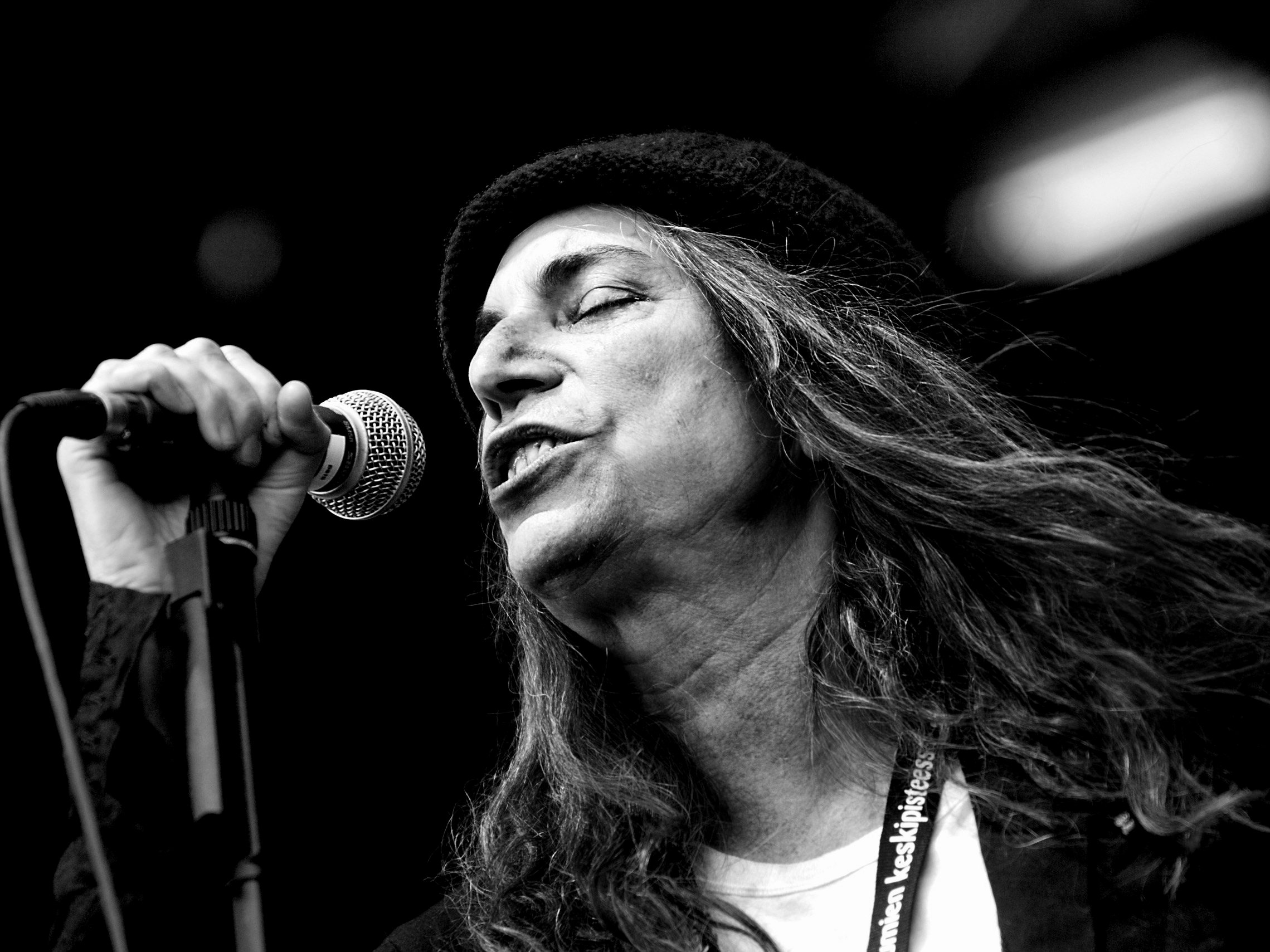
- Smith performing at Provinssirock in Seinäjoki, Finland in 2007
- Studio albums: 11
- Extended plays: 2
- Soundtrack albums: 3
- Live albums: 3
- Compilation albums: 4
- Singles: 19
- B-sides: 9
- Music videos: 7

This article is a discography of Patti Smith, an American rock singer-songwriter. Since 1974 she has released eleven studio albums, three live albums, two EPs, nineteen singles, three compilation albums, and one box set on Arista Records and Columbia Records.

== Albums ==
=== Studio albums ===
List of studio albums, with selected chart positions and certifications
Title	Album details	Peak chart positions										Certifications
Title	Album details	US	AUS	FRA	GER	JPN	NL	NOR	SWE	SWI	UK	Certifications
Horses	Released: November 10, 1975; Label: Arista Records (4066)	47	80	—	—	200	18	—	—	64	—	ARIA: Gold; BPI: Gold
Radio Ethiopia	Released: October 1976; Label: Arista Records (4097)	122	93	—	—	—	—	—	38	—	—	
Easter	Released: March 3, 1978; Label: Arista Records (4171)	20	11	—	43	280	—	10	34	—	16	BPI: Silver
Wave	Released: May 17, 1979; Label: Arista Records (4221)	18	30	—	18	—	16	7	17	—	41	
Dream of Life	Released: June 1988; Label: Arista Records (8453)	65	—	—	30	—	47	9	15	9	70	
Gone Again	Released: June 18, 1996; Label: Arista Records (18747)	55	81	46	28	—	51	33	18	29	44	
Peace and Noise	Released: September 30, 1997; Label: Arista Records (18986)	152	—	—	99	—	—	—	47	—	—	
Gung Ho	Released: March 21, 2000; Label: Arista Records (14618)	178	—	—	67	—	—	—	—	94	—	
Trampin'	Released: April 27, 2004; Label: Columbia Records (90330)	123	150	23	36	—	73	18	16	48	70	
Twelve	Released: April 17, 2007; Label: Columbia Records (87251)	60	107	12	17	82	41	35	26	23	63	
Banga	Released: June 5, 2012; Label: Columbia Records	57	50	10	19	109	37	3	10	12	47	

=== Live albums ===
List of live albums, with selected chart positions
Title	Album details	Peak chart positions			Certification
Title	Album details	US	AUS	UK	Certification
Horses/Horses	Released: November 2005; Label: Sony/Legacy Recordings (671445)	—	117	—	ARIA: Gold
February 10, 1971 (with Lenny Kaye)	Released: February 2006; Label: Mer Records (102)	—	—	—	
The Coral Sea (with Kevin Shields)	Released: July 2008; Label: PASK (001)	—	—	—	

=== Compilation albums ===
List of compilations albums, with selected chart positions
Title	Album details	Peak chart positions									
Title	Album details	US	AUS	BEL (FL)	BEL (WA)	FRA	NL	NOR	SWE	SWI	UK
The Patti Smith Masters	Released: June 1996; Label: Arista Records (18933)	—	—	—	—	—	—	—	—	—	—
Land (1975–2002)	Released: March 2002; Label: Arista Records (14708)	—	64	27	50	—	100	25	—	70	93
iTunes Originals – Patti Smith	Released: January 2008; Label: Sony BMG	—	—	—	—	—	—	—	—	—	—
Outside Society	Released: August 2011; Label: Sony Legacy	—	—	—	—	58	—	—	2	—	—
The Arista Years 1975/2000	Released: November 2011; Label: Sony Legacy	—	—	—	—	—	—	—	—	—	—
Curated By Record Store Day	Released: April 2022; Label: Sony Legacy	—	—	—	—	—	—	—	—	—	—

== EPs ==
List of extended plays, with selected chart positions
Title	Album details	Peak chart positions	
Title	Album details	US	UK
Hey Joe / Radio Ethiopia	Released: 1977; Label: Arista Records	—	—
Set Free	Released: 1978; Label: Arista Records (12197)	—	—
Live At Electric Lady	Released: 2021; Label: Columbia Records; Spotify Exclusive	—	—

== Singles ==
=== As lead artist ===
Title	Year	Peak chart positions							Album
Title	Year	US	BEL (FL)	BEL (WA)	FRA	NL	SWE	UK	Album
"Hey Joe" / "Piss Factory"	1974	—	—	—	—	—	—	—	Non-album single
"Gloria"	1976	—	—	44	—	—	—	54 (Note: Chart position is from the official UK "Breakers List".)	Horses
"Pissing in a River"	1976	—	—	—	—	—	—	—	Radio Ethiopia
"Pumping (My Heart)"	1976	—	—	—	—	—	—	—	Radio Ethiopia
"Ask the Angels"	1977	—	—	—	—	—	—	—	Radio Ethiopia
"Because the Night"	1978	13	28	—	173	47	9	5	Easter
"Privilege (Set Me Free)"	1978	—	—	—	—	—	—	72	Easter
"Frederick"	1979	90	—	—	—	—	—	63	Wave
"Dancing Barefoot"	1979	—	—	—	—	39	—	—	Wave
"So You Want to Be a Rock 'n' Roll Star"	1979	—	—	—	—	—	—	—	Wave
"People Have the Power"	1988	—	—	—	170	76	—	97	Dream of Life
"Looking for You (I Was)"	1988	—	—	—	—	—	—	—	Dream of Life
"Up There Down There"	1988	—	—	—	—	—	—	—	Dream of Life
"Summer Cannibals"	1996	—	—	—	—	—	—	82	Gone Again
"Gone Again"	1996	—	—	—	—	—	—	—	Gone Again
"1959"	1997	—	—	—	—	—	—	—	Peace and Noise
"Glitter in Their Eyes"	2000	—	—	—	—	—	—	—	Gung Ho
"Lo and Beholden"	2000	—	—	—	—	—	—	—	Gung Ho
"Higher Learning"	2002	—	—	—	—	—	—	—	Land
"When Doves Cry"	2002	—	—	—	—	—	—	—	Land
"Mother Rose"	2003	—	—	—	—	—	—	—	Trampin'
"Jubilee"	2004	—	—	—	—	—	—	—	Trampin'
"Gimme Shelter"	2007	—	—	—	—	—	—	—	Twelve
"April Fool"	2012	—	81	95	—	—	—	—	Banga

=== As featured artist ===
Title	Year	Peak chart positions		Album
Title	Year	US	UK	Album
"E-Bow the Letter" (R.E.M. featuring Patti Smith)	1996	49	4	New Adventures in Hi-Fi

== Non-album B-sides ==
Year	Title
1974	"Piss Factory"
1976	"My Generation" (live)
1977	"Time Is on My Side" (live)
1978	"God Speed"
1979	"Fire of Unknown Origin"
1979	"5-4-3-2-1" (live)
1988	"Wild Leaves"
1996	"Come Back Little Sheba"
1996	"Come On in My Kitchen"

== Audio books ==
Title	Album details
Just Kids	Nine-CD box set of Patti Smith reading her book Just Kids complete and unabridged; Released: July 26, 2011; Label: HarperAudio (ISBN 978-0062109385)
M Train	Six-CD box set of Patti Smith reading her book M Train complete and unabridged; Released: October 6, 2015; Label: Penguin Random House
Devotion	Patti Smith reading her book Devotion complete and unabridged; Released: April 17, 2018; Label: Blackstone Audio Inc
Year of the Monkey	Patti Smith reading her book Year of the Monkey complete and unabridged; Released: September 24, 2019; Label: Penguin Random House

== Other appearances ==
=== Studio ===
Year	Song	Album
1991	"It Takes Time" (feat. Fred "Sonic" Smith)	Until the End of the World
1995	"Walkin Blind"	Dead Man Walking
1997	"We Three Kings" (Traditional)	A Very Special Christmas 3
2006	"Qana"	N/A (digital downloads)
2007	"Without Chains"	N/A (digital downloads)
2011	"Words of Love"	Rave On Buddy Holly
2011	"The Mermaid Song"	The Rum Diary
2013	"Capitol Letter"	The Hunger Games: Catching Fire
2014	"Mercy Is"	Noah

=== Live & remixes ===
Year	Song	Album
1993	"Memorial Song" (aka "Memorial Tribute")	No Alternative
1997	"People Have the Power" (live - Bridge X, 1996)	The Bridge School Concerts Vol. 1
2006	"Wing" (live - Bridge X, 1996)	The Bridge School Collection, Vol.1
2010	"Because the Night" (with U2, Bruce Springsteen and Roy Bittan)	The 25th Anniversary Rock & Roll Hall of Fame Concerts
2012	"I, as a Person (Io come persona)"	...io ci sono
2013	"The Mermaid"	Son of Rogues Gallery: Pirate Ballads, Sea Songs & Chanteys
2019	"Wing"	Music Inspired by the Film Roma

=== Spoken-word ===
Year	Poem	Album
1978	"The Histories of the Universe"	Big Ego
1979	"Poem for Jim Morrison" & "Bumblebee"	The Nova Convention
1980	"Parade"	Sugar, Alcohol and Meat
1983	"7 Ways of Going/Fire of Unknown Origin" (live, with Lenny Kaye)	You're a Hook: The 15-Year Anniversary of Dial-a-Poem (1968–1983)

== Guest appearances ==
Year	Song	Album	Artist
1976	"The Revenge Of Vera Gemini"	Agents Of Fortune	Blue Öyster Cult
2012	"Helen Burns"	Helen Burns	Flea
2016	all tracks	Killer Road	Soundwalk Collective & Jesse Paris Smith
2019	all tracks	The Peyote Dance	Soundwalk Collective
2019	all tracks	Mummer Love	Soundwalk Collective
2020	all tracks	Peradam	Soundwalk Collective
2022	all tracks	The Perfect Vision: Reworkings	Soundwalk Collective

== Music videos ==
Year	Title	Album
1978	"Rock N Roll Nigger"	Easter
1988	"People Have the Power"	Dream of Life
1988	"Looking for You (I Was)"	Dream of Life
1996	"Summer Cannibals"	Gone Again
1996	"E-Bow the Letter"	New Adventures in Hi-Fi
2007	"Smells Like Teen Spirit"	Twelve
2007	"Pastime Paradise"	Twelve
