= Land (1975–2002) =

Compilation album by Patti Smith
- Released: March 19, 2002
- Recorded: 1974–2002
- Genre: Rock
- Length: 71:39 (disc one); 72:12 (disc two); 143:51 (total)
- Label: Arista

Patti Smith compilations chronology
| The Patti Smith Masters (1996) | Land (1975–2002) (2002) | iTunes Originals (2008) |

Professional ratings
Review scores
| Source | Rating |
|---|---|
| Allmusic | link |
| National Public Radio Apr 02 | |
| Robert Christgau | A− |
| Rolling Stone | 11 Apr 02 |

Land (1975–2002) is a two disc compilation album by Patti Smith, released on March 19, 2002, on Arista Records. Land (1975–2002) contains a collection of recordings from her eight previous albums on the first disc, along with B-sides and unreleased songs on the second disc. The album ranked number eight in Mojo's "Best Box Sets & Compilations of 2002". It is dedicated to the memory of Richard Sohl.

== Track listing ==
Disc One
| No. | Title | Writer(s) | From the album | Length |
|---|---|---|---|---|
| 1. | "Dancing Barefoot" | Patti Smith, Ivan Kral | Wave | 4:16 |
| 2. | "Babelogue" | Smith | Easter | 1:30 |
| 3. | "Rock N Roll Nigger" | Smith, Lenny Kaye | Easter | 3:23 |
| 4. | "Gloria" | Van Morrison, Smith | Horses | 5:53 |
| 5. | "Pissing in a River" | Smith, Kral | Radio Ethiopia | 4:51 |
| 6. | "Free Money" | Smith, Kaye | Horses | 3:48 |
| 7. | "People Have the Power" | Smith, Fred "Sonic" Smith | Dream of Life | 5:10 |
| 8. | "Because the Night" | Smith, Bruce Springsteen | Easter | 3:23 |
| 9. | "Frederick" | Smith | Wave | 3:03 |
| 10. | "Summer Cannibals" | Smith, Fred "Sonic" Smith | Gone Again | 4:09 |
| 11. | "Ghost Dance" | Smith, Kaye | Easter | 4:41 |
| 12. | "Ain't It Strange" | Smith, Kral | Radio Ethiopia | 6:37 |
| 13. | "1959" | Smith, Tony Shanahan | Peace and Noise | 4:01 |
| 14. | "Beneath the Southern Cross" | Smith, Kaye | Gone Again | 4:37 |
| 15. | "Glitter in Their Eyes" (Backing Vocals by Michael Stipe & Wade Raley) | Smith, Oliver Ray | Gung Ho | 3:05 |
| 16. | "Paths That Cross" | Smith, Fred "Sonic" Smith | Dream of Life | 4:20 |
| 17. | "When Doves Cry" | Prince | previously unreleased | 5:00 |
| Total length: | | | | 71:39 |

Disc Two
| No. | Title | Writer(s) | Length |
|---|---|---|---|
| 1. | "Piss Factory" (Track, 1974) | Smith, Richard Sohl | 5:03 |
| 2. | "Redondo Beach" (Demo, 1975) | Smith, Sohl, Kaye | 3:45 |
| 3. | "Distant Fingers" (Demo, 1975) | Smith, Allen Lanier | 4:57 |
| 4. | "25th Floor" (live - Eugene, Oregon, May 1978) | Smith, Kral | 5:43 |
| 5. | "Come Back Little Sheba" (Track, 1996) | Smith, Kaye | 2:36 |
| 6. | "Wander I Go" (Track, 1996) | Smith, Ray | 4:56 |
| 7. | "Dead City" (live - Denmark, 1 July 2001) | Smith, Ray | 4:35 |
| 8. | "Spell" (live - Portland, Oregon, 5 August 2001) | Ray (music), "Footnote to Howl" by Allen Ginsberg | 6:41 |
| 9. | "Wing" (live - Paris, July 2001) | Smith | 5:05 |
| 10. | "Boy Cried Wolf" (live - Paris, July 2001) | Smith | 5:49 |
| 11. | "Birdland" (live - Los Angeles, 9 August 2001) | Smith, Sohl, Kaye, Kral | 9:43 |
| 12. | "Higher Learning" (Track) | Smith, Rev. Frank Ray, Jay Dee Daugherty, Shanahan | 7:21 |
| 13. | "Notes to the Future / Tomorrow" (live - St. Mark's Poetry Project, St. Mark's Church, New York City, 1 January 2002 / live - Philadelphia, 13 May 1979) | Smith; Charles Strouse, Martin Charnin | 6:05 |
| Total length: | | | 72:12 |

"Tomorrow" on Disc Two is unlisted.

== Personnel ==
- Patti Smith – vocals, guitar, clarinet
- Lenny Kaye – guitar
- Richard Sohl – keyboards
- Ivan Kral – bass guitar
- Jay Dee Daugherty – drums
- Bruce Brody – keyboards
- Tony Shanahan – bass guitar, keyboards
- Oliver Ray – guitar

== Charts ==
Chart performance for Land (1975–2002)
| Chart (2002) | Peak position |
|---|---|
| Australian Albums (ARIA) | 64 |
| Austrian Albums (Ö3 Austria) | 53 |
| Belgian Albums (Ultratop Flanders) | 27 |
| Belgian Albums (Ultratop Wallonia) | 50 |
| Dutch Albums (Album Top 100) | 100 |
| Italian Albums (FIMI) | 20 |
| Norwegian Albums (VG-lista) | 25 |
| Swiss Albums (Schweizer Hitparade) | 70 |
| UK Albums (Official Charts) | 93 |

== Release history ==
| Date | Label | Format | Catalog |
|---|---|---|---|
| March 19, 2002 | Arista Records | CD | 14708 |
