= Trampin' =

Studio album by Patti Smith
- Released: April 27, 2004
- Recorded: Loho Studios, 2003
- Genre: Rock
- Length: 63:36
- Label: Columbia
- Producer: Patti Smith

Patti Smith chronology
Gung Ho (2000)	Trampin' (2004)	Twelve (2007)

Singles from Trampin'
- 1. "Jubilee" Released: 2004

Double CD edition
- Trampin'... Live aux Vieilles Charrues

Patti Smith live albums chronology
Live aux Vieilles Charrues (2004)	Horses/Horses (2005)

Professional ratings
Review scores
Source	Rating
Allmusic	link
BBC 21 Jun 07	
Robert Christgau	B+
The New York Times 26 Apr 04	
Pitchfork Media	(7.1/10) 3 Jun 04
Rolling Stone	13.5.04

Trampin' is the ninth studio album by Patti Smith, released April 27, 2004. It was the first album Smith released on the Columbia Records label. Rolling Stone magazine placed the record on its list of "The Top 50 Albums of 2004".

== Track listing ==
Disc one
No.	Title	Writer(s)	Length
1.	"Jubilee"	Patti Smith, Lenny Kaye, Jay Dee Daugherty	4:43
2.	"Mother Rose"	Smith, Tony Shanahan	4:56
3.	"Stride of the Mind"	Smith, Oliver Ray	3:37
4.	"Cartwheels"	Smith, Kaye	6:01
5.	"Gandhi"	Smith, Kaye, Daugherty, Shanahan, Ray	9:21
6.	"Trespasses"	Smith, Daugherty	5:00
7.	"My Blakean Year"	Smith	5:16
8.	"Cash"	Smith, Ray	4:20
9.	"Peaceable Kingdom"	Smith, Shanahan	5:09
10.	"Radio Baghdad"	Smith, Ray	12:17
11.	"Trampin'"	Traditional	2:56

Disc two (double CD edition): Trampin'... Live aux Vieilles Charrues
No.	Title	Writer(s)	Length
1.	"Jubilee"	Smith, Kaye, Daugherty	5:03
2.	"Break It Up"	Smith, Tom Verlaine	3:55
3.	"Beneath the Southern Cross"	Smith, Kaye	6:38
4.	"25th Floor"	Smith, Ivan Kral	6:57
5.	"Cash"	Smith, Ray	4:26
6.	"Seven Ways of Going"	Smith	8:17
7.	"Dancing Barefoot"	Smith, Kral	6:26
8.	"Free Money"	Smith, Kaye	4:59
9.	"Gandhi"	Smith, Kaye, Daugherty, Shanahan, Ray	10:38
10.	"Peaceable Kingdom"	Smith, Shanahan	5:45
11.	"Gloria"	Smith, Van Morrison	9:24

== Samples ==
"Jubilee"

== Personnel ==
Band

- Patti Smith – vocals, clarinet (2)
- Lenny Kaye – guitar, pedal steel
- Jay Dee Daugherty – drums, percussion, guitar
- Oliver Ray – guitar, farfisa, art direction, design
- Tony Shanahan – bass, keyboards, hammond organ, back vocals

Additional personnel

- Gail Marowitz – art direction, design
- Greg Calbi – mastering
- Jesse Smith – piano
- Joe Hogan – assistant
- Melodie McDaniel – photography
- Patrick McCarthy – mixing
- Rebecca Weiner Tompkins – violin
- Tom Gloady – assistant
- Emery Dobyns - Engineer

== Charts ==
Chart (2004)	Peak position
Australian Albums (ARIA)	150
Austria	49
Belgium	33
France	23
Germany	36
Italy	19
Netherlands	73
Norway	18
Sweden	16
Switzerland	48
UK Albums Chart	70
U.S. Billboard 200	123
U.S. Billboard Comprehensive Albums	134
U.S. Top Internet Albums	15

== Release history ==
Region	Date	Label	Format	Catalog
	April 27, 2004	Columbia Records	CD	90330
France	27 November 2004	Columbia Records	CD	5189372
