= Outside Society =

Greatest hits album by Patti Smith
- Released: August 23, 2011
- Recorded: 1975–2007
- Genre: Rock
- Length: 79:35
- Label: Legacy Recordings

Patti Smith chronology
| The Coral Sea (2008) | Outside Society (2011) | Banga (2012) |

Professional ratings
Review scores
| Source | Rating |
|---|---|
| AllMusic | 4/5 stars |

Outside Society is a compilation album released by American singer-songwriter, poet and visual artist Patti Smith. Outside Society is the first single-disc collection of her work and spans her entire career. The songs are in chronological order and the booklet contains comments by Smith on her work.

== Track listing ==
| No. | Title | Writer(s) | Length |
|---|---|---|---|
| 1. | "Gloria" | Van Morrison, Patti Smith | 5:52 |
| 2. | "Free Money" | Smith, Lenny Kaye | 3:50 |
| 3. | "Ain't It Strange" | Smith, Ivan Kral | 6:35 |
| 4. | "Pissing in a River" | Smith, Kral | 4:50 |
| 5. | "Because the Night" | Smith, Bruce Springsteen | 3:22 |
| 6. | "Rock n Roll Nigger" | Kaye, Smith | 4:42 |
| 7. | "Dancing Barefoot" | Kral, Smith | 4:16 |
| 8. | "Frederick" | Smith | 3:02 |
| 9. | "So You Want to Be a Rock 'n' Roll Star" | Roger McGuinn, Chris Hillman | 4:18 |
| 10. | "People Have the Power" | Smith, Fred "Sonic" Smith | 5:06 |
| 11. | "Up There Down There" | Smith, Smith | 4:48 |
| 12. | "Beneath the Southern Cross" | Kaye, Smith | 4:34 |
| 13. | "Summer Cannibals" | Smith, Smith | 4:09 |
| 14. | "1959" | Smith, Tony Shanahan | 3:58 |
| 15. | "Glitter in Their Eyes" | Smith, Oliver Ray | 3:03 |
| 16. | "Lo and Beholden" | Smith, Kaye | 4:19 |
| 17. | "Smells Like Teen Spirit" | Kurt Cobain, Dave Grohl, Krist Novoselic | 5:49 |
| 18. | "Trampin'" | Traditional | 2:52 |
| Total length: | | | 79:35 |

== Charts ==
| Chart (2011) | Peak position |
|---|---|
| French Albums Chart | 58 |
| Swedish Albums Chart | 2 |
| US Billboard Tastemakers | 10 |
