= The Patti Smith Masters =

Box set by Patti Smith
- Released: June 18, 1996
- Recorded: 1975–1996
- Genre: Rock
- Length: 283:07
- Label: Arista

Patti Smith compilations chronology
The Patti Smith Masters (1996)	Land (1975–2002) (2002)

Selected Songs
- Sixth disc cover

Professional ratings
Review scores
Source	Rating
Allmusic	4/5 stars

The Patti Smith Masters is the box set by American rock singer-songwriter Patti Smith, released June 18, 1996, on Arista Records. The box set contains 20-bit digitally remastered CD versions of Smith's first five albums with bonus tracks, and a sixth disc, Selected Songs.

== Track listing ==
=== Disc six (Selected Songs) ===
#	Title	Songwriter	Length
1	"Gloria"	Van Morrison, Patti Smith	5:55
2	"Redondo Beach"	Lenny Kaye, Patti Smith, Richard Sohl	3:26
3	"Ask the Angels"	Ivan Kral, Patti Smith	3:10
4	"Because the Night"	Patti Smith, Bruce Springsteen	3:24
5	"Babelogue / Rock N Roll Nigger"	Kaye, Patti Smith	4:54
6	"Dancing Barefoot"	Kral, Patti Smith	4:18
7	"People Have the Power"	Patti Smith; Fred "Sonic" Smith	5:11
8	"Paths That Cross"	Patti Smith, Fred Smith	4:20
9	"Gone Again"	Patti Smith, Fred Smith	3:16
10	"Summer Cannibals"	Patti Smith, Fred Smith	4:10

== Release history ==
Date	Label	Format	Catalog
June 18, 1996	Arista Records	CD	18933
