= Early Work =

Book by Patti Smith

- Author: Patti Smith
- Cover artist: Robert Mapplethorpe
- Language: English
- Genre: Poetry
- Publisher: Norton & Company
- Publication date: March 1994
- Publication place: United States
- Media type: Hardcover, Paperback
- Pages: 177
- ISBN: 978-0-393-03605-3
- OCLC: 28221961
- Dewey Decimal: 811/.54 20
- LC Class: PS3569.M53787 A6 1994

Early Work is a poetry collection by Patti Smith, published in 1994.

== Contents ==
=== 1970–1972 ===
1. "Prayer"
2. "Ballad of a Bad Boy"
3. "Oath"
4. "Anna of the Harbor"
5. "The Sheep Lady from Algiers"
6. "Work Song"
7. "Notebook"
8. "Conversation with the Kid"
9. "The Ballad of Hagen Walker"
10. "Seventh Heaven"
11. "Amelia Earhart"
12. "k.o.d.a.k."
13. "Dog Dream"
14. "Jeanne d'Arc"
15. "A Fire of Unknown Origin"
16. "Death by Water"
17. "The Amazing Tale of Skunkdog"

=== 1973–1974 ===
1. "Notice"
2. "Witt"
3. "Piss Factory"
4. "Balance"
5. "Dream of Rimbaud"
6. "Notice 2"
7. "Judith Revisited"
8. "Georgia O'Keeffe"
9. "Picasso Laughing"
10. "Rape"
11. "Gibralto"
12. "Ha! Ha! Houdini!"
13. "Schinden"
14. "16 February"
15. "Jet Flakes"
16. "Translators"
17. "Easter"

=== 1975–1976 ===
1. "Neo Boy"
2. "Sohl"
3. "Land"
4. "Suite"
5. "Grant"
6. "December"
7. "Doctor Love"
8. "AFTER/WORDS"
9. "ps/alm 23 revisited"
10. "Rimbaud Dead"
11. "Thermos"
12. "The Ballad of Isabelle Eberhardt"
13. "Corps de Plane"
14. "Babelfield"
15. "Babelogue"

=== 1977–1979 ===
1. "High on Rebellion"
2. "The Salvation of Rock"
3. "Hymn"
4. "Munich"
5. "Health Lantern"
6. "Penicillin"
7. "Robert Bresson"
8. "Burning Roses"
9. "Thread"
10. "A Fleet of Deer"
11. "Scream of the Butterfly"
12. "Y"
13. "Combe"
14. "Wave"
15. "Florence"
16. "Wing"
17. "Italy"
18. "True Music"
