= Babel (book) =

Poetry book by Patti Smith

- Author: Patti Smith
- Cover artist: Lynn Goldsmith
- Language: English
- Genre: Poetry
- Publisher: G. P. Putnam's Sons
- Publication date: 1978
- Publication place: United States
- Media type: Hardcover, Paperback
- Pages: 202
- ISBN: 978-0-399-12102-9
- OCLC: 3380074

Babel is a book by Patti Smith, published in 1978, and contains Smith's poems along with her prose, lyrics, pictures and drawings.

== Contents ==
=== Radio Ethiopia ===
1. "Notice"
2. "Italy"
3. "The Tapper Extracts"
4. "Grant"
5. "Street of the Guides"
6. "Rimbaud Dead"
7. "Sohl"
8. "Neo Boy"
9. "Dog Dream"
10. "Mirza"
11. "The Stream"
12. "The Dream of Rimbaud"
13. "Doctor Love"

=== Alien to Alien ===
1. "Munich"
2. "High on Rebellion"
3. "Ain't It Strange"
4. "Egypt"
5. "Rape"
6. "Space Monkey"
7. "Suite"

=== Sister Morphine ===
1. "Notice 2"
2. "Judith"
3. "Georgia O'Keeffe"
4. "A Fire of Unknown Origin"
5. "Edie Sedgewick"
6. "Judith Revisited"
7. "Marianne Faithfull"
8. "Sister Morphine"

=== Pipe Dreams ===
1. "Bread"
2. "Sterling Forest"
3. "Grass"
4. "Vandal"
5. "The Amazing Tale of Skunkdog"
6. "Konya the Shepherd"
7. "Sandayu the Separate"
8. "Conteé"
9. "Saba the Bird"
10. "Thermos"
11. "Enculé"

=== Mohammedia ===
1. "The Sheep Lady from Algiers"
2. "Penicillin"
3. "Robert Bresson"
4. "Carnival! Carnival!"
5. "k.o.d.a.k."
6. "Mad Juana"
7. "The Salvation of Rock"

=== Corps de Plane ===
1. "Corps de Plane"
2. "Jeanne Darc"
3. "Jenny"
4. "Health Lantern"
5. "Hymn"
6. "The Ninth Hole"
7. "Thread"
8. "A Fleet of Deer"
9. "Easter"

=== Babel ===
1. "Chain Gang"
2. "Babel"
3. "Pinwheels"
4. "Comic Warrior"
5. "Babelogue"
6. "Combe"
7. "Babel Field"
8. "Zug Island"
