= Sammy Hagar (album) =

Studio album by Sammy Hagar
- Released: January 1977
- Recorded: 1975–76
- Studio: Abbey Road (London)
- Genre: Hard rock
- Length: 38:48
- Label: Capitol
- Producer: John Carter

Sammy Hagar chronology
Nine on a Ten Scale (1976)	Sammy Hagar (1977)	Musical Chairs (1977)

Professional ratings
Review scores
Source	Rating
AllMusic	4/5 stars

Sammy Hagar is the second studio album by American rock singer Sammy Hagar, released in January 1977 by Capitol Records. It is also often referred to as The Red Album, as it includes Hagar's first anthem, "Red", which is also the basis for his nickname "The Red Rocker". Future multi-platinum selling producer Scott Mathews was talked into playing a drum solo on "Red" after being told Ringo Starr had played his only drum solo in the very same room on The Beatles' last album, named after the EMI Studios this album was recorded in, Abbey Road.

According to Billboard Magazine, Capitol Records pressed the single, "Red" onto Red vinyl, a first for the company.

== Cover art ==
The distinctive cover image was shot in Stockwell Road, London, SW9 in the midst of the rows of red Pride & Clark auto shops. These red-painted buildings are also seen in the 1966 film Blowup. A red three piece suit, labelled "Granny Takes A Trip", the single breasted jacket, trousers and waistcoat with red and white braid trim, was made for Tony Stevens circa 1974. Sammy stayed at Stevens' house while in England in 1976 and borrowed the suit from Stevens' wardrobe for the cover shoot.

== Song information ==
- "Red" was the first cover that Bette Midler made of a Hagar song, the second being "Keep On Rockin'" from the soundtrack of the 1979 film The Rose. Midler released "Red" on her 1977 album Broken Blossom.
- "Catch The Wind" was the second cover that Hagar made of a Donovan song. The first was "Young Girl Blues" which appeared on his first solo album Nine on a Ten Scale. Donovan's single was released on his album What's Bin Did and What's Bin Hid in 1965.
- "Free Money" is a cover of a Patti Smith song, which she released on her album Horses. Smith and Hagar were, coincidentally, inducted into the Rock and Roll Hall of Fame on the same night in 2007. During the televised induction ceremony, "Free Money" was one of the songs featured in a montage of Smith's past live performances.
- "Fillmore Shuffle" is a cover of a track on the 1972 self-titled debut album from a British band named Pilot.
- "Hungry" is a cover of a song that was first a hit for Paul Revere & the Raiders, from their 1966 album The Spirit of '67.
- "Eclipse" is an instrumental outro that follows the song "Little Star".

== Track listing ==
Side one
No.	Title	Writer(s)	Length
1.	"Red"	John Carter; Sammy Hagar	4:04
2.	"Catch the Wind" (Donovan cover)	Donovan Phillips Leitch	4:37
3.	"Cruisin' & Boozin'"	Hagar	3:09
4.	"Free Money" (Patti Smith cover)	Lenny Kaye; Patti Smith	3:59
5.	"Rock 'n' Roll Weekend"	Hagar	3:09

Side two
No.	Title	Writer(s)	Length
6.	"Fillmore Shuffle" (Pilot cover)	Bruce Stephens	3:45
7.	"Hungry" (Paul Revere & the Raiders cover)	Barry Mann; Cynthia Weil	3:05
8.	"The Pits"	Carter; Hagar	3:06
9.	"Love Has Found Me"	Hagar	3:51
10.	"Little Star/Eclipse"	Hagar	6:08
Total length:			38:48

== Personnel ==
- Sammy Hagar – lead vocals, guitar
- Bill Church – bass guitar
- Alan Fitzgerald – keyboards
- David Lewark – guitar
- Scott Mathews – drums

== Reissues ==
- The 1996 One Way Records re-release includes a bonus live track, "Growing Pains", which was recorded at the Long Beach Arena in Long Beach, California, on July 13, 1980. This is an unreleased outtake from the recording that was used to make the album Live 1980.

== Singles ==
- "Catch the Wind" (mono edit) b/w "Catch the Wind" (stereo edit) - US (Capitol SPRO-8586)
- "Catch the Wind" (album version) b/w "Red" - US (Capitol SPRO-8587)
- "Catch the Wind" b/w "Rock 'n' Roll Weekend" - UK (Capitol CL 15913)
- "Catch the Wind" b/w "Red" - Belgium (Capitol C006-85 105)
- "Catch the Wind" b/w "Red" - France (Capitol C006-85 105)
- "Catch the Wind" b/w "Red" - Germany (Capitol 006-85 105)
- "Catch the Wind" b/w "Red" - Holland (Capitol 5C 006-85 105)
- "Catch the Wind" b/w "Red" - Italy (Capitol 3C 006 85105)

== Releases ==
- Capitol (US): ST-11599
- Capitol (UK): GO 2007
- Capitol (Germany): 1C064-85079 (released with the title "Just Visiting")
- BGO (1993 UK reissue): BGOCD181
- One Way Records (1996 US reissue): 72438 19096 21
