= Set Free (EP) =

EP by Patti Smith Group
- Released: August 4, 1978
- Recorded: 1976, 1978
- Genre: Punk rock
- Length: 17:34
- Label: Arista
- Producer: Jimmy Iovine, Jack Douglas

Patti Smith Group EPs chronology
Hey Joe / Radio Ethiopia (1977)	Set Free (1978)

Professional ratings
Review scores
Source	Rating
Allmusic	4.5/5 stars

Set Free is the EP by Patti Smith Group, released in 1978 on Arista Records.

== Track listing ==
=== Side one ===
1. "Privilege (Set Me Free)" (Mel London, Mike Leander, Psalm 23) – 3:27
2. "Ask the Angels" (Smith, Ivan Kral) – 3:07

=== Side two ===
1. "25th Floor" (Live in Paris, Easter Sunday 1978) (Smith, Kral) – 5:15
2. "Babel Field" (Live in London, 28 February 1978 - Brian Jones' birthday) (Smith) – 5:45

== Personnel ==
- Patti Smith – vocals, guitar

== Release history ==
Region	Date	Label	Format	Catalog
United Kingdom	1978	Arista Records	LP	12197
