= Photo album (disambiguation) =

A photo album is a series of photographs collected and placed into a book or similar.

Photo album may also refer to:

- Photoalbum (album), a 2001 album by Ivan Král
- The Photo Album, a 2001 album by Death Cab for Cutie
- The Photo Album (Wordsworth album), a 2012 album by Wordsworth
- Photo Album (film), a 2005 video album by Nickelback

== See also ==
- Album (disambiguation)
