= Hey Joe (disambiguation) =

"Hey Joe" is a song by Billy Roberts

Hey Joe may also refer to:

- "Hey Joe!", a 1953 song by Boudleaux Bryant, recorded by Carl Smith and Frankie Laine
- "Hey Joe", a 1983 song by Daniel Johnston from the album Hi, How Are You
- Hey Joe / Radio Ethiopia, 1977 EP by Patti Smith Group, including a cover version of the Billy Roberts song
- Hey Joe (film), a 2024 film by Claudio Giovannesi

== See also ==
- Eh Joe, a play for television, written by Samuel Beckett in 1965
