= Hey Joe / Radio Ethiopia =

EP by Patti Smith Group
- Released: 1977
- Recorded: Electric Lady Studios, 1974; CBGB, 1977
- Genre: Punk rock
- Length: 20:45
- Label: Arista
- Producer: Lenny Kaye, Jimmy Iovine

Patti Smith Group EPs chronology
Hey Joe / Radio Ethiopia (1977)	Set Free (1978)

Professional ratings
Review scores
Source	Rating
Allmusic	3/5 stars

Hey Joe / Radio Ethiopia is the first EP by Patti Smith Group, released in 1977 on Arista Records.

== Track listing ==
=== Side one ===
1. "Hey Joe" (Patti Smith, Billy Roberts) – 5:05

=== Side two ===
1. "Radio Ethiopia" (Smith, Lenny Kaye) – 15:40
  - Recorded live at CBGBs, New York on June 5, 1977

== Personnel ==
Patti Smith Group

- Patti Smith – vocals, guitar
- Lenny Kaye – guitar
- Jay Dee Daugherty – drums
- Ivan Kral – bass
- Richard Sohl – piano, organ

Additional personnel

- Allen Lanier – audio mixing
- Tom Verlaine – guitar on "Hey Joe"
- Dave Palmer – engineering

== Release history ==
Region	Date	Label	Format	Catalog
France	1977	Arista Records	LP	2C 052-60133z
