= Set Free =

Set Free may refer to:

- Set Free (1918 film), an American comedy film
- Set Free (1927 film), an American silent western film
- Set Free (album), a 2005 album by The American Analog Set
- Set Free (EP), a 1978 EP by Patti Smith Group
- Set Free, a 1989 album by Constance Demby
