= Ivan Král =

Czech-American musician (1948–2020)

Ivan Kral
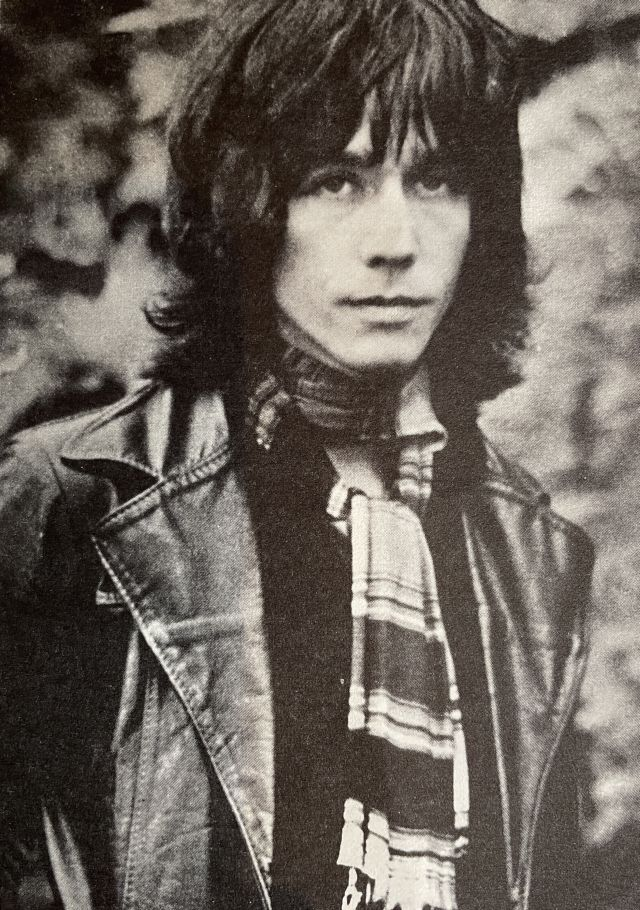
- Kral in 1974

Background information
- Born: 12 May 1948; Prague, Czechoslovakia
- Died: 2 February 2020 (aged 71) Ann Arbor, Michigan, U.S.
- Genres: Rock; pop; jazz; alternative rock; garage rock; protopunk; ambient; electronic
- Occupations: Musician; record producer; filmmaker
- Instruments: Guitar; piano; keyboards; bass; vocals; cello
- Years active: 1966–2020
- Labels: Arista; PolyGram; Universal; Chrysalis; Sony; BMG; Supraphon; Warner
- Spouses: Cindy Hudson (m. 2018); Lynette Krall (1972–1997)
- Website: ivankral.net

Ivan Král (12 May 1948 – 2 February 2020) was a Czech-born American composer, filmmaker, guitarist, record producer, bassist, and singer-songwriter. He worked across genres including pop music, punk rock, garage rock, rock, jazz, soul, country and film scores. His music has been recorded by such artists as U2, Téléphone, Patti Smith, Iggy Pop, David Bowie, Simple Minds, and John Waite, among others, and he won three times at the Anděl Awards. He died of cancer in 2020, aged 71.

== Biography ==
=== Early life ===
Born in Prague, Czechoslovakia (now Czech Republic), Ivan Král moved to the United States in 1966 as a refugee with his parents, who were diplomats. His father Karel Král, a reporter at the United Nations, brought worldwide attention to the pending Warsaw Pact invasion of Czechoslovakia in 1968 and publicly denounced the action, subsequently deciding not to return. Král had refugee status until 1981 when he obtained U.S. citizenship.

=== Early career and the Patti Smith Group ===
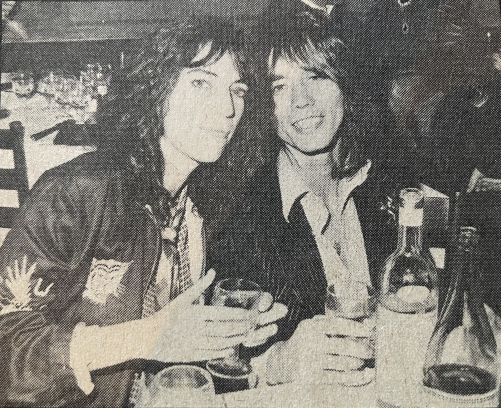
Patti Smith and Ivan Kral promoting an album in Italy, 1978

Kral's American music career began during the early 1970s glam rock scene in New York. His band, Luger, which also featured drummer Shayne Harris, performed at venues including Max's Kansas City, and opened for Kiss at the early shows at the Hotel Diplomat in 1973. After their breakup in 1973, he joined Shaun Cassidy's backing group, then Blondie, then Patti Smith, then Iggy Pop.

Between 1975 and 1979, Kral was co-writer, guitarist, and bassist of the Patti Smith Group on her first four albums, including debut, Horses (1975), named one of the All-Time 100 Greatest Albums by Time magazine in 2006. The album is in the National Recording Registry at the Library of Congress, for recordings considered "culturally, historically, or aesthetically significant."

His work also appears on other Smith albums, including Radio Ethiopia (1976), Easter (1978) and Wave (1979).

Some of Kral's songs written during this period include "Ask the Angels", "Pissing in a River", "25th Floor", "Revenge", "Citizen Ship", "Birdland", "Ain't It Strange", "Pumping (My Heart)" and Smith's "Dancing Barefoot", which Rolling Stone included in its 500 Greatest Albums of All Time and has been recorded by artists including U2, Simple Minds and Pearl Jam.

=== Filmmaking work ===
Kral wanted a visual diary of his days in New York City in case he was ever deported back home to Czechoslovakia where rock music was forbidden, so he bought a Super 8 camera from a pawn shop. He began filming at Murray the K shows in 1967, with clips of the first show in America by The Who, Cream and Mitch Ryder then eventually got a 16mm film camera, on which he filmed other concerts including early Queen, David Bowie, Patti Smith. Some of the clips appear in his 1975 DIY compilation movie, Night Lunch. They are known as some of the earliest footage of the bands.

Kral also filmed his bandmates and friends at rehearsals at the Hotel Chelsea, The Bottom Line, and CBGB. He compiled the footage into a 1976 film titled The Blank Generation, which features the Ramones, Talking Heads, Blondie, New York Dolls, Television, and drag queen Jayne County, before they had record deals. No Wave filmmaker Amos Poe helped Kral edit the film by adding music from each band's cassettes and cutting irrelevant scenes. The Blank Generation D-I-Y clip compilation is often referred to as the original visual document of the birth of No Wave. There are no effects, production, posing, scripts or budget, and it is the source film for many music documentaries. In 1978 Kral made the ambient soundtrack for Amos Poe's No Wave film The Foreigner.

=== After the Patti Smith Group ===
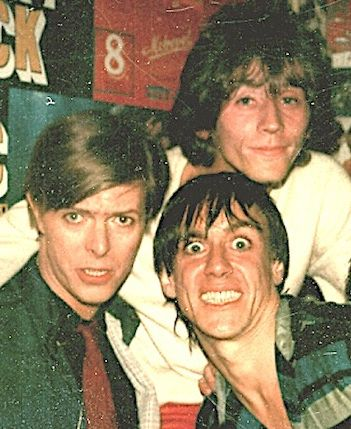
David Bowie, Iggy Pop, and Ivan Kral in Berlin, 1980

In 1979, after Patti Smith's last show in Florence, Italy, Iggy Pop invited Kral to Rockfield Studios in Wales to work on his album Soldier, produced by Pat Moran. After the Soldier tour, Kral became Iggy's co-writer and guitarist for all the original songs on his 1981 album, Party.

Kral hoped to build a career as a film composer by heading to Los Angeles to compose music for the Barry Levinson film Diner (1982), but eventually returned to New York. He wrote and recorded the film scores for three films by underground filmmaker Amos Poe, titled, Unmade Beds, The Foreigner and Subway Riders in his apartment on his mini Moog synthesizer, piano and guitar.

In the 1980s, Kral was involved in a number of short-term projects. He recorded and toured with John Waite, former singer with The Babys, and co-wrote songs for his album Ignition and Mask of Smiles. Kral wrote songs for many other artists, including Mick Ronson (formerly with David Bowie and The Spiders from Mars), and was involved in rehearsals with British guitarist Chris Spedding and Welsh avant-garde composer, recording artist John Cale, formerly of the Velvet Underground, to create a new band, but it never materialized. Kral also owned a video store in New Brunswick, New Jersey in the 1980s.

Kral subsequently formed his own band, Eastern Bloc, with a record deal and video with Passport Records, though the project ended when the label folded in the mid-1980s.

"Wasn't It Great (CBGB)" (2018)

Kral also ran a studio in New York from 1982 to 1993, named PAWS, where Mick Jagger, The B-52's, and reggae artists like Kiddus I rehearsed.

Kral wrote the music for “Rest in Peace” for the memorial song of Czech President Vaclav Havel and Cindy Hudson wrote the lyrics in 2011.

Kral wrote the music for “Wasn’t It Great” tribute song to CBGB owner Hilly Kristal and Cindy Hudson wrote the lyrics in 2007.

=== Return to Czech Republic ===
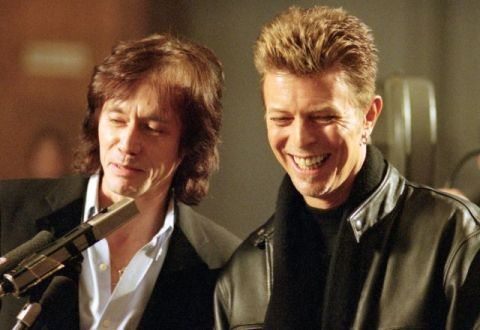
Ivan Kral and David Bowie in Prague, 1996

In 1989, the Berlin Wall fell and the Velvet Revolution brought Communism to an end in Czechoslovakia. Král returned to Prague in 1993, and began working with other rock artists to develop the new Czech rock scene, using his experiences in the West to develop Czech talent and working as a songwriter, producer and musician.

Patti Smith, while still living in Detroit, recorded her poem "Perfect Moon" at 54 Sound studio for Král's 1995 album Nostalgia. John Cale wrote and recorded the piano for the song.

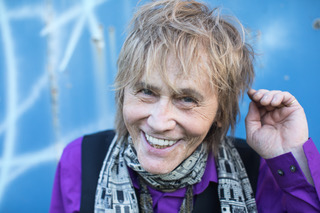
Ivan Král in front of a graffiti-ed rail car in Michigan 2017.

Král worked from his home studio in Ann Arbor, Michigan. His 2014 CD, Always, was recorded at Funky D Studios, Detroit; 2018 album, Colors, was recorded at Pearl Sound Studios in Michigan; his 2020 album Smile was recorded at the Bunnyhutch. In 2021 post-humous album, Undiscovered, was released. Warner Music Czech Republic also released a box set of three CDs, Ivan Kral – Later Years, in 2020. His previous ten albums were released on Universal Music Group and Polygram and were recorded in the Czech Republic or in Seattle.

As a producer, Král worked with the Vipers and the Band of Outsiders, as well as Czech bands such as Lucie (on their studio album Černý kočky mokrý žáby) and David Koller, Ivan Hlas, Jiří Suchý, Aneta Langerová, Miroslav Žbirka, Alice, Debbi, Triny, and Garage. He also released many solo albums.

He was a collector of the work of the avant-garde Czech photographer František Drtikol. The video for his song "Winner Takes All" was inspired by Drtikol's work with the female form.

Král wrote music for the memorial of President Václav Havel, and performed it for live broadcast across the Czech Republic following Havel's funeral at the St. Vitus Cathedral. His wife, lyricist Cindy Hudson, wrote the lyrics.

== Awards ==
Kral won a Czech Academy of Popular Music award for:

1994 – Best Producer for album Černý Kočky Mokrý Žáby by band Lucie

1995 – Best Producer for solo Ivan Kral CD Nostalgia

1998 – Best Producer for album Walk Choc Ice by band Walk Choc Ice

Kral was nominated for the Czech Lion film score award in 2001 for the music in the film Cabriolet.

== Filmography ==
=== As director ===
- Night Lunch – glam and rock band compilation (1975)
- The Blank Generation (1976)
- Iggy and the Stooges: Live at Academy of Music New York City (2011)

=== Appearances ===
- Live Stockholm, April 15, 1977 - on lead/rhythm guitar
- Rockpalast: Patti Smith Group – on bass guitar and as backing vocalist (1979)
- Dancing Barefoot (1995)
- Mňága – Happy End (1996)
- Cabriolet (2001)
- Pátrání po Ester – Documentary (2005)
- Letem světem s Kuřetem – TV Movie (2011)
- Show Jana Krause – Episode dated 29 April 2011 – TV Series (2011)
- Show Jana Krause – Episode dated 5 October 2012 – TV Series (2012)
- VIP zprávy – Episode dated 16 April 2014 – TV Series (2014)
- GEN - Galerie elity národa (2018)

== Film music ==
=== Scores ===
- Unmade Beds (1976), director Amos Poe
- The Foreigner (1978), director Amos Poe
- Subway Riders (1981), director Amos Poe
- Diner (1982), director Barry Levinson
- Modré z Nebe (1997), director Eva Borušovičová
- Pelíšky (1999), director Jan Hřebejk
- Cabriolet (2001), director Marcel Bystroň

=== Soundtracks ===
- Shining Girls, episode Cutline - TV 2022 (writer: “Pissing in a River”)
- Mindhunter, episode #2.8 - TV 2019 (writer: "Dancing Barefoot")
- The Deuce, episode There's an Art to This - TV 2018 (writer: "Ask the Angels")
- Un violent désir de bonheur - 2018 (writer: "Birdland")
- Don't Blink - Robert Frank - Documentary 2015 (writer: "Ask the Angels")
- State of Affairs, episode Bang, Bang - TV 2014 (writer: "Bang Bang")
- Show Jana Krause, episode dated 20 June 2014 - TV 2014 (music "Sen")
- The Vampire Diaries, episode Because the Night - TV 2013 (writer: "Ask the Angels")
- Endless Bummer - 2009 (writer: "Bang Bang")
- Chuck, episode Chuck Versus the Ex - 2008 (writer: "Pumpin' for Jill")
- GAL - 2006 (writer: "Bang Bang")
- Crossing Jordan, episode Secrets & Lies: Part 1 - TV 2002 (writer: "Dancing Barefoot")
- New Waterford Girl - 1999 (writer: "Ask the Angels")
- Whatever - 1998 (writer: "Dancing Barefoot")
- Millennium, episode Anamnesis - TV 1998 (writer: "Dancing Barefoot")
- All Over Me - 1997 (writer: "Pissing in the River")
- Barb Wire - 1996 (writer: "Dancing Barefoot")
- The Basketball Diaries - 1995 (writer: "Dancing Barefoot")
- Threesome - 1994 (writer: "Dancing Barefoot")
- Rock & Rule - 1983 (writer: "Pain & Suffering")
- A Night at Halsted's - 1982 (writer: "Pumping (My Heart)")
- Times Square - 1980 (writer: "Pissing in the River")
- Ohne Maulkorb, episode 20 Stunden mit Patti Smith - TV documentary 1978 (writer: "25th Floor", "Pumping (My Heart)")

== Discography ==
=== Solo ===
- Native (1992)
- Nostalgia (1995)
- Looking Back (1996)
- Native: His Native Complete (1996)
- Alias (1997) (with Ivan Hlas, David Koller and Karel Šůcha)
- Modré z nebe (soundtrack) (1997)
- Prohlédnutí / Clear Eyes (1998)
- ... "dancing barefoot" (1999)
- Dancing Reboot ● Ivan Kral ● Remixed (1999)
- Živě, dětským domovům (live) (1999)
- Best of Ivan Kral (compilation) (2001)
- Cabriolet (soundtrack) (2001)
- Photoalbum (2002)
- Erotická revue (2003)
- Bang Bang! (2005)
- Always (2014)
- Colors (2018)
- Smile (2020)
- Ivan Kral - Later Years box set (2020)

=== with Patti Smith ===
- Horses (1975)
- Radio Ethiopia (1976)
- Hey Joe / Radio Ethiopia – recorded live at CBGBs, New York on 5 June 1977 (1977)
- Easter (1978)
- Set Free (1978)
- Wave (1979)
- The Patti Smith Masters – Patti Smith compilation (1996)
- Land – Patti Smith compilation (2002)
- Horses / Horses Live (2005)
- iTunes Originals – Patti Smith (2008)
- Outside Society – Patti Smith Greatest Hits (2011)
- The Arista Years 1975 box set (2011)

=== with Iggy Pop ===
- Soldier (1980)
- Party (1981)

=== with John Waite ===
- Ignition (1982)
- No Brakes (1984)
- Mask of Smiles (1985)

=== with Téléphone ===
- Dure Limite "Ce Soir est ce Soir" (1982) his name being wrongly spelt Yvan Kral on some album credits

=== with John Cale ===
- Even Cowgirls Get the Blues (1987)

=== with Eastern Bloc ===
- Wall to Wall (1987)

=== with Sky Cries Mary ===
- Exit at the Axis (1991)

=== with Noel Redding and Friends ===
- Live from Bunkr - Prague (1996)

=== with Triny Vocal Trio ===
- Gypsy Streams (2001)

=== with Lucie ===
- Černý kočky mokrý žáby (1994), producer, co-writer, recording musician
- Pohyby (1996), co-producer, recording musician
- Lucie v opeře (2003), co-writer of song "Sen" for opera version
- Vše nejlepší ,88 - [99) (1999), compilation album, co-writer, producer, recording musician
- The Best Of (2009), compilation album, co-writer, producer, recording musician

=== with David Koller ===
- Teď a tady (2015), co-writer

=== with Miro Žbirka ===
- Meky (1997), mix engineer, vocals, recording musician
- Songs for Boys & Girls (1999), co-producer, vocals, recording musician
- the best of 93 - 03 (2003), vocals, recording musician
- 22x2: The Best Of (2007), producer, mix engineer

=== with Lenka Filipová ===
- Svět se zbláznil (1997), producer, co-writer

=== with Janek Ledecký ===
- Některý věci jsou jenom jednou (1995), producer, co-writer, recording musician

=== with Jiří Suchý ===
- Znám tolik písní... (1996), producer
- Purpura a jiné vánoční písně (1997), producer

=== with Alice ===
- Alice (1995), producer, mix engineer, recording musician

=== with Aneta Langerová ===
- Spousta andělů (2004), co-producer, recording musician

=== with Walk Choc Ice ===
- Walk Choc Ice (1998), producer, recording musician

=== with Mňága a Žďorp ===
- Ryzí zlato (1995), producer, recording musician
- Happy End (1996), co-producer, recording musician
- platinum collection (2008), compilation album, producer, co-writer, recording musician

=== with Garáž ===
- Garage (1994), producer, co-writer, recording musician
- To byla Garáž (1997), co-producer
- Garáž, nejlepší léta. /2/ (2010), co-writer

=== with Pusa ===
- Pusa (1996), co-writer

== Covers ==
Kral wrote the music for the Patti Smith song "Dancing Barefoot" and Smith wrote the lyrics.

The song has been covered by U2 (two versions), Pearl Jam, First Aid Kit, Johnny Depp, Simple Minds, The Mission, Celibate Rifles, Xymox, Lea DeLaria, Alison Moorer, Todd Rundgren, Shakespears Sister, The Feelies, Johnette Napolitano, and appeared on various soundtracks.

Kral also wrote the music for the David Bowie song "Bang Bang", and Iggy Pop wrote the lyrics.

== Books ==
- VEDRAL, Honza, 2019. Neuvěřitelný Ivan Král. Prague : Slovart, spol. s r.o. ISBN 978-80-7529-819-5
