= Piss Factory =

Single by Patti Smith
- A-side: "Hey Joe"
- B-side: "Piss Factory"
- Released: November 1974
- Recorded: Electric Lady Studios, June 5, 1974
- Genre: Proto-punk
- Length: 4:41
- Label: Mer
- Songwriters: Patti Smith, Richard Sohl
- Producer: Lenny Kaye

"Piss Factory" is a song written by Patti Smith and Richard Sohl, and released as a B-side on Smith's debut single "Hey Joe" in 1974. It was included on the Vertigo Records compilation album New Wave in 1977, Sire Records 1992 compilation album Just Say Yesterday, and later reissued on the rarities compilation Land (1975–2002).

In 1989, Dave Marsh placed the song at 718th on the list of The 1001 Greatest Singles Ever Made.

The song originated as a poem written by Smith about the time she spent working in a baby buggy factory, expressing her assurance that she would not let the experience kill her ambitions.
