= The Coral Sea (album) =

Live album by Patti Smith and Kevin Shields
- Released: July 7, 2008
- Recorded: June 22, 2005 (CD1); September 12, 2006 (CD2)
- Venue: Queen Elizabeth Hall, London
- Genre: Spoken word
- Length: 64:39 (CD1), 54:43 (CD2), 119:22 (Total)
- Label: PASK
- Producer: Patti Smith, Kevin Shields

Patti Smith live albums chronology
Horses/Horses (2005)	The Coral Sea (2008)	Outside Society (2011)

Professional ratings
Review scores
Source	Rating
allmusic	4.5/5 stars
The Guardian	4/5 stars
The Independent	3/5 stars
Mojo	3/5 stars
The New York Times	(favorable)
Pitchfork Media	(6.8/10)
PopMatters	8/10 stars
Q	3/5 stars
Spin	(favorable)
The Village Voice	(favorable)

The Coral Sea is a live recording of two performances by Patti Smith and Kevin Shields from 2005 and 2006. The set consists of Smith's homage to the photographer, her friend and former lover Robert Mapplethorpe, and consists of the text of her epic 1996 poem of the same title. Shields accompanies in an improvisational manner on guitar.

== Recording ==
The performances were recorded on June 22, 2005 and September 12, 2006 (with a third, unreleased performance the previous night) at Queen Elizabeth Hall on London's South Bank. In terms of music the two performances are stylistically different, but the words remain the same. The poem tells the story of M (Mapplethorpe) on a final voyage to see the stars of the Southern Cross before he dies.

== Track listing ==
All lyrics are written by Patti Smith; all music is composed by Kevin Shields.

Disc one
No.	Title	Length
1.	"Untitled"	14:32
2.	"Untitled"	12:42
3.	"Untitled"	7:22
4.	"Untitled"	13:02
5.	"Untitled"	7:54
6.	"Untitled"	9:07
Total length:		64:39

Disc two
No.	Title	Length
7.	"Untitled"	11:00
8.	"Untitled"	13:38
9.	"Untitled"	14:25
10.	"Untitled"	15:40
Total length:		54:43

== Personnel ==
All personnel credits adapted from The Coral Sea's liner notes.

Performers

- Patti Smith – vocals
- Kevin Shields – guitar, mixing

Technical personnel

- Ben Thackeray – engineer
- Emery Dobyns – engineer

Design personnel

- Xiaofei Zhang – art direction, design

== Release history ==
Region	Date	Format	Label	Catalog
United Kingdom	July 7, 2008	2xCD	Cargo	—
United States	July 8, 2008	2xCD	PASK	001
