= Songbook (Nick Hornby book) =

Collection of essays by Nick Hornby

- Author: Nick Hornby
- Illustrator: Marcel Dzama
- Genre: Non-fiction
- Publisher: McSweeney's
- Publication date: 2002
- ISBN: 9781101218549

Songbook (published in the United Kingdom as 31 Songs) is a 2002 collection of 26 essays by English writer Nick Hornby about songs and (more often) the particular emotional resonance they carry for him. In the UK, Sony released a stand-alone CD, A Selection of Music from 31 Songs, featuring 18 songs. The hardcover edition of Songbook, published in the US by McSweeney's and illustrated by Marcel Dzama, includes a CD with 11 of the songs featured in the book.

== Summary ==
The music varies from established classics like Bruce Springsteen and Bob Dylan to independents like Ani DiFranco, Top 40 pop like Nelly Furtado, and a few songs with special meaning only to Hornby. Song by song, Hornby delves into what makes music catchy or classic, and how it can come to play an integral role in a person's emotional life.

Proceeds from the book go to the TreeHouse Trust, a UK charity operating a school for children with autism and communications disorders, which Hornby's son attends, and to 826 Valencia, a US-based learning center, founded by McSweeney's publisher Dave Eggers, that offers writing workshops and tutoring.

The paperback edition of Songbook adds a few music-related essays by Hornby from other sources.

After the release of "Songbook," McSweeney accepted online submissions from authors writing about their favourite songs in the same manner as Hornby. These submissions were posted to the McSweeney website. After Hornby mentioned he was a fan in Songbook, Ben Folds contacted him and Hornby wrote the song "That's Me Trying" for William Shatner's album Has Been.

== Contents ==
There are 31 songs, but only 26 essays; in a few instances, multiple songs are discussed within a single piece.

1. Teenage Fanclub – "Your Love Is the Place Where I Come From"
2. Bruce Springsteen – "Thunder Road"
3. Nelly Furtado – "I'm Like a Bird"
4. Led Zeppelin – "Heartbreaker"
5. Rufus Wainwright – "One Man Guy"
6. Santana – "Samba Pa Ti"
7. Rod Stewart – "Mama, You Been on My Mind"
8. Bob Dylan – "Can You Please Crawl Out Your Window?"
9. The Beatles – "Rain"
10. Ani DiFranco – "You Had Time"
11. Aimee Mann – "I've Had It"
12. Paul Westerberg – "Born for Me"
13. Suicide – "Frankie Teardrop"
14. Teenage Fanclub – "Ain't That Enough"
15. The J. Geils Band – "First I Look at the Purse"
16. Ben Folds Five – "Smoke"
17. Badly Drawn Boy – "A Minor Incident"
18. The Bible – "Glorybound"
19. Van Morrison – "Caravan"
20. Butch Hancock and Marce LaCouture – "So I'll Run"
21. Gregory Isaacs – "Puff, the Magic Dragon"
22. Ian Dury and the Blockheads – "Reasons to be Cheerful, Part 3"
23. Richard and Linda Thompson – "Calvary Cross"
24. Jackson Browne – "Late for the Sky"
25. Mark Mulcahy – "Hey Self-Defeater"
26. The Velvelettes – "Needle in a Haystack"
27. O.V. Wright – "Let's Straighten It Out"
28. Röyksopp – "Röyksopp's Night Out"
29. The Avalanches – "Frontier Psychiatrist"
30. Soulwax – "No Fun / Push It"
31. Patti Smith Group – "Pissing in a River"

Paperback additions

- "It's a Mann's World: Melodies for a Darker Mood", on Aimee Mann's album Bachelor No. 2
- "Alternative Earle: The Resurrection of a Great Songwriter", on Steve Earle's album Transcendental Blues
- "The Entertainers: Learning from Los Lobos", on Los Lobos' box set El Cancionero Mas y Mas
- "Sweet Misery: The Mellowing of Nick Cave", on Nick Cave & the Bad Seeds's album No More Shall We Part
- "Pop Quiz: What Does the New Top Ten List Mean?", on the Billboard magazine's ten best-selling albums in the United States of 28 July 2001
- 40 Favourite Songs, 2000–2010

== A Selection of Music from 31 Songs track listing (UK) ==
1. Teenage Fanclub – "Your Love Is the Place Where I Come From"
2. Bruce Springsteen – "Thunder Road"
3. Rufus Wainwright – "One Man Guy"
4. Rod Stewart – "Mama You Been on My Mind"
5. Ani DiFranco – "You Had Time"
6. Paul Westerberg – "Born for Me"
7. Ben Folds Five – "Smoke"
8. Badly Drawn Boy – "A Minor Incident"
9. The Bible – "Glorybound"
10. Gregory Isaacs – "Puff, the Magic Dragon"
11. Ian Dury & the Blockheads – "Reasons to be Cheerful, Part 3"
12. Richard and Linda Thompson – "The Calvary Cross"
13. Jackson Browne – "Late for the Sky"
14. Mark Mulcahy – "Hey Self-Defeater"
15. The Velvelettes – "Needle in a Haystack"
16. O.V. Wright – "Let's Straighten It Out"
17. The Avalanches – "Frontier Psychiatrist"
18. Patti Smith Group – "Pissing in a River"

== Selections from Nick Hornby's Songbook track listing (US) ==
1. Paul Westerberg – "Born for Me"
2. Teenage Fanclub – "Your Love Is the Place Where I Come From"
3. The Bible – "Glorybound"
4. Aimee Mann – "I've Had It"
5. Rufus Wainwright – "One Man Guy"
6. Rod Stewart – "Mama, You Been on My Mind"
7. Badly Drawn Boy – "A Minor Incident"
8. Teenage Fanclub – "Ain't That Enough"
9. Ben Folds Five – "Smoke"
10. Mark Mulcahy – "Hey Self-Defeater"
11. Ani DiFranco – "You Had Time"
