= The Coral Sea (book) =

Book by Patti Smith

- Author: Patti Smith
- Cover artist: Robert Mapplethorpe
- Language: English
- Genre: Prose poetry
- Publisher: Norton & Company
- Publication date: May 1996
- Publication place: United States
- Media type: Hardcover, Paperback
- Pages: 72
- ISBN: 978-0-393-03908-5
- OCLC: 33009444
- Dewey Decimal: 811/.54 20
- LC Class: PS3569.M53787 C67 1996

The Coral Sea is a book by Patti Smith, published in 1996. In 2008, Smith released The Coral Sea as an album with musical accompaniment by Kevin Shields of My Bloody Valentine, recorded during two live performances of the duo.

== Contents ==
=== Voyage ===
1. "The Passenger M"
2. "The Throw"
3. "Light Play"
4. "Rank and File"
5. "Music (A Woman)"
6. "Staff of Life"
7. "After Thoughts"
8. "An Auctioned Heart"
9. "A Bed of Roses"
10. "Monkeyshines"
11. "The Herculean Moth"
12. "The Solomon Islands"
13. "The Pedestal"

=== Litany ===
1. "Crux"
2. "Magua"
3. "Imago"
