= Pissing in a River =

Single by Patti Smith

from the album Radio Ethiopia
- B-side: "Ask the Angels"
- Released: 1976
- Recorded: Record Plant Studios, 1976
- Length: 4:41
- Label: Arista
- Songwriters: Patti Smith, Ivan Král
- Producer: Jack Douglas

Patti Smith singles chronology
"Gloria" (1976)	"Pissing in a River" (1976)	""Pumping (My Heart)"" (1976)

"Pissing in a River" is a rock song written by Patti Smith and Ivan Král, and released as a lead single from the Patti Smith Group's 1976 album Radio Ethiopia.

The song was featured in both the 1980 movie Times Square and the 1997 independent film All Over Me. Nick Hornby describes "Pissing in a River" as one of 31 songs that have provided a soundtrack to his life. It is featured in Episode 3 of Series 2 of the British TV series Clique and in the pilot episode of the 2022 Apple+ TV series Shining Girls. It also appears on Smith's compilations Land and iTunes Originals.

Tori Amos references the song in the track "Space Dog" included in her second studio album Under the Pink.
