= Pumping (My Heart) =

Single by Patti Smith Group

from the album Radio Ethiopia
- B-side: "Ask the Angels"
- Released: 1976
- Recorded: Record Plant Studios, 1976
- Length: 3:20
- Label: Arista
- Songwriter(s): Patti Smith, Ivan Král, Jay Dee Daugherty
- Producer(s): Jack Douglas

Patti Smith singles chronology
""Pissing in a River"" (1976)	""Pumping (My Heart)"" (1976)	"Ask the Angels" (1977)

"Pumping (My Heart)" is a rock song written by Patti Smith, Ivan Král and Jay Dee Daugherty, and released as a second single from Patti Smith Group 1976 album Radio Ethiopia. In 1989 the song was covered by Dramarama on their album Box Office Bomb.
