= Photoalbum (album) =

Studio album by Ivan Kral
- Released: 2002
- Genre: Alternative rock
- Length: 47:48
- Label: CDirect
- Producer: Ivan Kral, Vladimír Papež

Ivan Kral chronology
Cabriolet (2001)	Photoalbum (2002)	Erotická revue (2002)

Professional ratings
Review scores
Source	Rating
Musicserver.cz	8/10 stars

Photoalbum is a solo album by Czech musician Ivan Kral, former member of Patti Smith Group. It was released in 2002 by CDirect label and it was produced by Kral himself together with Vladimír Papež. Kral on the album plays guitar, bass, keyboards and sings; he is accompanied by drummer Emil Frátrik and harmonica player Vladimír Papež. It was his last solo studio album to 2014's Always.

== Track listing ==
1. "Pretty Lady"
2. "You Take My Money"
3. "Funny Farm"
4. "Put'em Up!"
5. "Telling Lies"
6. "Smoke Out"
7. "I'm Lazy"
8. "Another Broken Heart"
9. "Time"
10. "You're No Good"
11. "Let It Go"
12. "Hold Me Now"
13. "Addiction"
14. "Dark Eyes"

== Personnel ==
- Ivan Kral − vocals, guitars, bass guitar, keyboards
- Emil Frátrik − drums
- Vladimír Papež − harmonica
