= Free Money (song) =

Song by Patti Smith

from the album Horses
- Released: December 13, 1975
- Studio: Electric Lady
- Genre: Proto-punk
- Length: 3:52
- Label: Arista
- Songwriter(s): Patti Smith; Lenny Kaye
- Producer(s): John Cale

Horses track listing
- 8 tracks Side one: 1. "Gloria: In Excelsis Deo / Gloria"; 2. "Redondo Beach"; 3. "Birdland"; 4. "Free Money"; Disc two: 1. "Kimberly"; 2. "Break It Up"; 3. "Land: Horses / Land of a Thousand Dances / La Mer (De)"; 4. "Elegie"

"Free Money" is a rock song written by Patti Smith and Lenny Kaye, and first released on Smith's 1975 album Horses. In 1977 Sammy Hagar covered the song on his eponymous album. Also covered by Penetration on their album Moving Targets and later by Cell as a B-side.
