= Wave (Patti Smith Group album) =

Studio album by Patti Smith Group
- Released: May 17, 1979
- Recorded: 1979
- Studio: Bearsville (Woodstock, New York)
- Genre: Art rock; art punk; pop rock
- Length: 37:45
- Label: Arista
- Producer: Todd Rundgren

Patti Smith chronology
Easter (1978)	Wave (1979)	Dream of Life (1988)

Singles from Wave
- 1. "Frederick AS 0427" Released: 1979; 2. "Dancing Barefoot ARIST 281 (UK)" Released: 1979; 3. "So You Want to Be (A Rock 'n' Roll Star) AS 0453" Released: 1979

Wave is the fourth studio album by Patti Smith, and the third and final album where the Patti Smith Group is billed. It was released on May 17, 1979, by Arista Records. Produced by Todd Rundgren, the album continued the band's move towards more radio-friendly mainstream pop rock sound. Wave garnered a mixed reception from music critics and was less successful than its predecessor, Easter (1978). However, the songs "Frederick" and "Dancing Barefoot" both received commercial airplay. Following the album's release, the band disbanded, and frontwoman Patti Smith pursued a solo career nine years later with Dream of Life (1988).

== Background and release ==
"Dancing Barefoot"
"Dancing Barefoot" was described as a love song that uses "love-as-addiction" metaphors.

The title track was a tribute to Pope John Paul I, whose brief papacy coincided with the recording sessions of Wave. The first single of the album was "Frederick", a love song for frontwoman Patti Smith's fiancé Fred "Sonic" Smith with a melody and structure bearing a resemblance to "Because the Night", the group's biggest hit. Smith began writing the lyrics of second single "Dancing Barefoot" in late 1978 and recorded it in 1979. The song was described as "a swirling, seductive love song" that uses "love-as-addiction" metaphors and wordplay with the words "heroine" and "heroin". Smith stated she was told to replace the word "heroine" with a synonym because of issues with radio airplay, but she objected the decision since she actually intended the lyric to reference the female equivalent of hero. Rolling Stone ranked the song number 323 on their 2004 list of the "500 Greatest Songs of All Time". Both songs received commercial airplay. A cover of the Byrds' "So You Want to Be (A Rock 'n' Roll Star)" was released as the album's third and final single.

After Wave was released, the band disbanded in fall 1979 when finishing their last concert in Florence, Italy. Patti married Fred on March 1, 1980 and spent many years in semi-retirement from music following the birth of their children, Jesse and Jackson, until her return as a solo singer with Dream of Life (1988). The 1996 remaster of Wave includes Smith's original version of "Fire of Unknown Origin". Blue Öyster Cult's version was released on their album of the same name in 1981. The back cover of the original LP bore a quote from the Jean Genet poem "Le Condamné à mort".

== Critical reception ==
Professional ratings
Review scores
Source	Rating
AllMusic	3/5 stars
Christgau's Record Guide	B+
Mojo	3/5 stars
Smash Hits	5/10
Spin	3.5/5 stars

In Christgau's Record Guide: Rock Albums of the Seventies (1981), Robert Christgau found the album "quirkier than the more generally satisfying Easter and praised "Dancing Barefoot" and the title track. However, he dismissed "Seven Ways of Going" and "Broken Flag" as "unlistenable [and less interesting than]" the band's 1976 album Radio Ethiopia. Tom Carson of Rolling Stone also negatively likenened Wave to Radio Ethiopia, concluding that the record "is too confused and hermetically smug to be much more than an interesting failure." The Globe and Mail determined that "Rundgren handles the production chores with remarkable restraint as he showcases Patti Smith the suicidal torch singer, admirably backed by her resident group of musicians."

AllMusic's William Ruhlmann noted that Smith "achieves a sense of charm and sincerity on Wave that she hadn't even attempted on her earlier albums" but lamented that "the overall mediocre quality of the material makes this the slightest of Smith's efforts." In a 2019 review for PopMatters, Matt McKinzie dubbed the album as the singer's "most unapologetically-pop effort" where she "reject[s] the idea that her genre capabilities begin and end with th[e] four-letter word [punk]." Emma Johnston, a writer from Louder Sound, ranked Wave number 6 on a list of Patti Smith's best albums, writing that it was "Smith at her least filtered and most emotionally open, and remains something of an underrated treasure."

== Track listing ==
Side one
No.	Title	Writer(s)	Length
1.	"Frederick"	Patti Smith	3:01
2.	"Dancing Barefoot"	Smith; Ivan Kral	4:18
3.	"So You Want to Be (A Rock 'n' Roll Star)"	Jim McGuinn; Chris Hillman	4:18
4.	"Hymn"	Smith; Lenny Kaye	1:10
5.	"Revenge"	Smith; Kral	5:06

Side two
No.	Title	Writer(s)	Length
6.	"Citizen Ship"	Smith; Kral	5:09
7.	"Seven Ways of Going"	Smith; Kral; Kaye; Jay Dee Daugherty; Richard Sohl	5:12
8.	"Broken Flag"	Smith; Kaye	4:55
9.	"Wave"	Smith	4:55

CD reissue bonus tracks
No.	Title	Writer(s)	Length
10.	"Fire of Unknown Origin"	Smith; Kaye	2:09
11.	"5-4-3-2-1" / "Wave" (Live, May 23, 1979, New York)	Paul Jones; Mike Hugg; Manfred Mann	2:43

Note

- On some vinyl releases "So You Want to Be (A Rock 'n' Roll Star)" and "Citizen Ship" swapped places.

== Personnel ==
Patti Smith Group

- Jay Dee Daugherty – drums, consultant
- Lenny Kaye – guitar, bass guitar on "Wave", vocals
- Ivan Kral – bass guitar, guitar, cello on "Wave", keyboards
- Richard Sohl – piano, ocean effects on "Wave"
- Patti Smith – vocals, piano on "Wave"

Additional musicians

- Andi Ostrowe – percussion, timpani on "Seven Ways of Going"
- Todd Rundgren – bass guitar on "Dancing Barefoot", production, engineering

Technical

- Thom Panunzio and Patti Smith Group - production on "54321/Wave", recorded live in New York, May 23, 1979
- Vic Anesini – mastering
- George Carnell – assistant engineer
- Tom Edmonds – assistant engineer
- Robert Mapplethorpe - art direction, photography

== Charts ==
Chart (1979)	Peak position
Australia (Kent Music Report)	30
France (SNEP)	2
Austrian Albums (Ö3 Austria)	19
Dutch Albums (Album Top 100)	16
German Albums (Offizielle Top 100)	18
New Zealand Albums (RMNZ)	6
Norwegian Albums (VG-lista)	7
Swedish Albums (Sverigetopplistan)	17
UK Albums (OCC)	41
US Billboard 200	18

=== Year-end charts ===
1979 year-end chart performance for Wave
Chart (1979)	Position
French Albums (SNEP)	4

== Certifications and sales ==
Region	Certification	Certified units/sales
France (SNEP)	Gold	100,000^{*}
^{*} Sales figures based on certification alone.

== Release history ==
Date	Label	Format	Catalog No.
May 17, 1979	Arista Records	LP	4221
c. 1986 (original CD release from LP master)	Arista Records	CD	251139
1996 (Digital Remaster by Bill Inglot and Ken Perry)	Arista Records	CD	18829-2
2007 (20-bit Digital Remaster by Bob Irwin and Vic Anesini)	Sony BMG	CD	37930
2008	Sony BMG	CD 'Original Album Classics' box set	88697313832
