= Rock N Roll Nigger =

"Rock n Roll Nigger"

Song by Patti Smith Group

from the album Easter
- Released: March 3, 1978
- Studio: Record Plant Studios
- Genre: Punk rock
- Length: 3:13
- Label: Arista
- Songwriters: Patti Smith, Lenny Kaye
- Producer: Jimmy Iovine

"Rock n Roll Nigger" is a rock song written by Patti Smith and Lenny Kaye, and released on the Patti Smith Group's 1978 album Easter.

While the song has always been controversial for its repeated use of the racial slur "nigger", a remix was included on the soundtrack of the 1994 film Natural Born Killers, and it has since been covered by several other artists, including Marilyn Manson (1995).

In October 2022, the song was removed from digital streaming services such as Spotify, although cover and live versions of the song remain available.

== Use of the word "nigger" ==
In the song, Smith self-identifies as a "nigger", which she uses to mean a rebellious and honorable outsider. Duncombe and Tremblay suggest in White Riot that Smith is continuing Norman Mailer's tradition of The White Negro, adopting black culture to express things she believes her own culture will not allow, and rejecting the oppression white culture has historically imposed on others.

In an interview following the release of Easter, Smith discussed the song with a reporter from Rolling Stone.

Reporter: The other day you said that if anyone was qualified to be a nigger, it was Mick Jagger. How is Mick Jagger qualified to be a nigger?
Smith: On our liner notes I redefined the word nigger as being an artist-mutant that was going beyond gender.
Reporter: I didn't understand how Mick Jagger has suffered like anyone who grew up in Harlem.
Smith: Suffering don't make you a nigger. I mean, I grew up poor too. Stylistically, I believe he qualifies. I think Mick Jagger has suffered plenty. He also has a great heart, and I believe, ya know, even in his most cynical moments, a great love for his children. He's got a lot of soul. I mean, like, I don't understand the question. Ya think black people are better than white people or sumpthin'? I was raised with black people. It's like, I can walk down the street and say to a kid, “Hey nigger”. I don't have any kind of super-respect or fear of that kind of stuff. When I say statements like that, they're not supposed to be analyzed, 'cause they're more like off-the-cuff humorous statements. I do have a sense of humor, ya know, which is something that most people completely wash over when they deal with me. I never read anything where anybody talked about my sense of humor. It's like, a lot of the stuff I say is true, but it's supposed to be funny.

== Reception ==
Because of its title and repeated use of the word "nigger", which had long been understood to be a racist slur, "Rock n Roll Nigger" received no mainstream radio airplay. It was never released as a single, despite its popularity with live audiences (the singles from Easter were "Because the Night"/"God Speed" in August 1977, and "Privilege (Set me free)"/"25th Floor" about 12 months later).

In 2008, "Rock n Roll Nigger" was listed in The Pitchfork 500, a music-guide published by Pitchfork that lists the top 500 songs between 1977 and 2006.

== Marilyn Manson cover ==
Marilyn Manson covered the song for his 1995 album Smells like Children. Of his decision to cover the song Manson explained: "I thought 'Rock n Roll Nigger' was a song that I could really relate to, and our fans could relate to, about being an outsider. I also thought that nobody else really, in our era of music, had the courage to do a cover of a song like that because, you know, they would get in trouble for the title but this song isn't about racism. It's about standing up for yourself."

== Sources ==
- Rock N Roll Nigger, song search, AllMusic Guide
