= Privilege (Set Me Free) =

Single by Patti Smith Group

from the album Easter
- B-side: "25th Floor" (Live)
- Released: 4 August 1978
- Recorded: Record Plant Studios
- Length: 3:27
- Label: Arista
- Songwriters: Mel London, Mike Leander, Psalm 23
- Producer: Jimmy Iovine

Patti Smith singles chronology
""Because the Night"" (1978)	""Privilege (Set Me Free)"" (1978)	"Frederick" (1979)

"Privilege (Set Me Free)" is a song by the Patti Smith Group and released as the second single from their 1978 album Easter. The original version of the song was titled "Free Me" and was written by Mel London and Mike Leander for the 1967 film Privilege and released in the United States as a single by The Pace on the Reprise label in 1968. Patti spoke sections of Psalm 23 over the instrumental bridge among other lyrical additions. At the beginning of the recording process, Wayne Kramer of MC5 played guitar on "Privilege (Set Me Free)". Although reportedly there was friction during the recording sessions with Smith expressing dissatisfaction with Kramer's guitar playing. This led to Kramer leaving the studio, along with his involvement in the record disappearing.

== Liner notes ==
The following is quoted from the album:

the title track from the john hayman-peter watkins production of the film privilege. a movie that
merged the rock martyr (paul jones) with all the sacristal images of the sixties...the cross..
the christ..the whip and the lashes that served to veil velvet weeping balls-the eyes
of jean shrimpton.

== Charts ==
Chart (1978)	Position
UK Singles Chart	72
Irish Singles Chart	13
