= Radio Ethiopia =

Studio album by Patti Smith Group
- Released: October 22, 1976
- Recorded: 1976
- Studio: Record Plant (New York City)
- Genres: Punk rock; hard rock
- Length: 41:15
- Label: Arista
- Producer: Jack Douglas

Patti Smith Group chronology
Horses (1975)	Radio Ethiopia (1976)	Easter (1978)

Singles from Radio Ethiopia
- 1. "Pissing in a River" Released: 1976; 2. "Pumping (My Heart)" Released: 1976; 3. "Ask the Angels" Released: 1977

Radio Ethiopia is the second studio album by American musician Patti Smith, and her first album credited to Patti Smith Group. The album was released October 22, 1976 through Arista Records.

== Background ==
Radio Ethiopia was the follow-up record to Smith's widely acclaimed debut Horses. In interviews surrounding the album's release, Smith explained that she chose producer Jack Douglas in hopes of making the album commercially successful. Smith co-wrote much of the album with bassist Ivan Král, the band member keenest for commercial success.

"Ain't It Strange" and "Distant Fingers", the latter co-written with Smith's long-time boyfriend Allen Lanier, had both been staples of the Group's concerts long before the recording of Horses.

== Artwork ==
The album's cover photograph is by Judy Linn, while the back of the album features a photo by Lynn Goldsmith. The album was dedicated to Arthur Rimbaud and Constantin Brâncuși. The back cover of the album bears the legend: "Free Wayne Kramer", who at the time was incarcerated in Kentucky following his conviction for dealing cocaine.

== Critical reception ==
Professional ratings
Review scores
Source	Rating
AllMusic	3.5/5 stars
Chicago Tribune	2.5/4 stars
Christgau's Record Guide	A−
Mojo	4/5 stars
Q	4/5 stars
The Rolling Stone Album Guide	3.5/5 stars
Spin Alternative Record Guide	7/10
Uncut	7/10

Radio Ethiopia was negatively received when it was released and Smith was attacked by critics for what they perceived to be laziness, self-indulgence and selling out. Critics in negative reviews cited that Douglas' production placed more emphasis on creating a heavy sound through numerous guitar parts that smothered Smith's vocals, and, at times, lamented that all of the album's songs were originals of the group.

In a contemporary review of Radio Ethiopia, Rolling Stone critic Dave Marsh opined that Smith "seems to lack the direction necessary to live up to her own best ideas". In Creem, Richard Meltzer was more enthusiastic and wrote that "there really ain't no way I'm gonna be anything but thrilled to my shorthairs by a Patti LP and this one's no exception." Village Voice critic Robert Christgau stated that the album's sound "delivers the charge of heavy metal without the depressing predictability; its riff power ... has the human elan of a band that is still learning to play."

AllMusic critic William Ruhlmann retrospectively described Radio Ethiopia as "a schizophrenic album in which the many elements that had worked so well together on Horses now seemed jarringly incompatible", noting that the Patti Smith Group had "encountered the same development problem the punks would—as they learned their craft and competence set in, they lost some of the unself-consciousness that had made their music so appealing." In 2001, the album was listed in Mojo's "Ultimate CD Buyers Guide".

== Track listing ==
No.	Title	Writer(s)	Length
1.	"Ask the Angels"	Patti Smith; Ivan Král	3:07
2.	"Ain't It Strange"	Smith; Král	6:35
3.	"Poppies"	Smith; Richard Sohl	7:05
4.	"Pissing in a River"	Smith; Král	4:41
5.	"Pumping (My Heart)"	Smith; Král; Jay Dee Daugherty	3:20
6.	"Distant Fingers"	Smith; Allen Lanier	4:17
7.	"Radio Ethiopia"	Smith; Lenny Kaye	10:00
8.	"Abyssinia"	Smith; Kaye; Sohl	2:10

1996 CD reissue bonus track
No.	Title	Writer(s)	Length
9.	"Chiklets"	Smith; Král	6:23

Notes

- "Radio Ethiopia" and "Abyssinia" were recorded live on August 9, 1976.

== Personnel ==
Patti Smith Group

- Patti Smith – vocals, guitar (Fender Duo-Sonic), design
- Jay Dee Daugherty – drums, percussion, mixing, consultant
- Lenny Kaye – guitar (Fender Stratocaster), bass, vocals, mixing
- Ivan Král – bass, guitar
- Richard Sohl – keyboards, synthesizer, piano

Additional personnel

- Jack Douglas – production
- Vic Anesini – mastering
- Sam Ginsberg – engineering (assistant)
- Lynn Goldsmith – photography
- Nancy Greenberg – design
- Bob Irwin – mastering
- George Marino – mastering
- Jay Messina – mixing, engineering
- Rod O'Brien – engineering (assistant)
- Brian Sperber – engineering

== Charts ==
Chart (1976–1977)	Peak position
Australian Albums (Kent Music Report)	93
Swedish Albums (Sverigetopplistan)	38
US Billboard 200	122

Chart (2026)	Peak position
Greek Albums (IFPI)	42

== Release history ==
Date	Label	Format	Catalog no.
October 1976	Arista Records	LP, 8-Track, Cassette	4097
1996	Arista Records	CD	18825
2007	Sony BMG	CD	37928
2008	Sony BMG	"Original Album Classics" CD box set	88697313832
