= Frederick (song) =

1979 song by Patti Smith

Single by Patti Smith Group

from the album Wave
- B-side: "Frederick" (Live)
- Released: May 1979
- Recorded: Bearsville Studios
- Genre: New wave
- Length: 3:01
- Label: Arista
- Songwriter: Patti Smith
- Producer: Todd Rundgren

Patti Smith singles chronology
| "Privilege (Set Me Free)" (1978) | "Frederick" (1979) | "Dancing Barefoot" (1979) |

"Frederick"

Single by Sandie Shaw
- B-side: "Go Johnny Go"
- Released: 1986
- Genre: Pop
- Label: Polydor
- Songwriter: Patti Smith
- Producers: Clive Langer, Alan Winstanley

Sandie Shaw singles chronology
| "Are You Ready to Be Heartbroken" (1986) | "Frederick" (1986) | "Please Help the Cause Against Loneliness" (1988) |

"Frederick" is a song written by Patti Smith, and released as the lead single from Patti Smith Group's 1979 album Wave. The song is dedicated to Fred "Sonic" Smith, guitar player of the Detroit band MC5 and Smith's future husband.

The melody of "Frederick" is an homage to Bruce Springsteen's live arrangement of "Prove It All Night" from the then-recent Darkness Tour of 1978.

== Reception ==
Smash Hits said, "Patti has been getting a lot of stick from her original admirers for 'selling out' and going pop. I think they're being short-sighted (not to mention cloth-eared). This is an excellent sample of her new work with producer Todd Rundgren."

== Covers ==
The song was covered by Sandie Shaw in 1986. The B-side was entitled "Go Johnny Go", and had been written by Shaw as a tribute to Johnny Marr.

== Charts ==
Patti Smith Group

| Chart (1979) | Position |
|---|---|
| Billboard Hot 100 | 90 |
| Italy | 14 |
| UK Singles Chart | 63 |
