= Horses (album) =

Studio album by Patti Smith
- Released: November 10, 1975
- Recorded: September 2–18, 1975
- Studios: Electric Lady, New York City
- Genres: Punk rock; art punk; garage rock
- Length: 43:10
- Label: Arista
- Producer: John Cale

Patti Smith chronology
Horses (1975)	Radio Ethiopia (1976)

Singles from Horses
- 1. "Gloria" Released: April 1976

Horses is the debut studio album by American musician Patti Smith, released on November 10, 1975 by Arista Records. Smith, supported by her regular backing band, recorded the album at Electric Lady Studios in September 1975, choosing former Velvet Underground member John Cale as the album's producer.

The music on Horses was informed by the minimalist aesthetic of the punk rock genre, then in its formative years. Smith and her band composed the album's songs using simple chord progressions, while also breaking from punk tradition in their propensity for improvisation and embrace of ideas from avant-garde and other musical styles. With Horses, Smith drew upon her backgrounds in rock music and poetry, aiming to create an album combining both forms. Her lyrics were alternately rooted in her own personal experiences, particularly with her family, and in more fantastical imagery. Horses was additionally inspired by Smith's reflections on the previous era of rock music—with two of its songs being adapted in part from 1960s rock standards, and others containing lyrical allusions and tributes to past rock performers—and her hopes for the music's future.

At the time of its release, Horses experienced modest commercial success and reached the top 50 of the Billboard 200 album chart, while being widely acclaimed by music critics. Recognized as a seminal recording in the history of punk and later rock movements, Horses has appeared in numerous lists of the greatest albums of all time. In 2009, it was selected by the Library of Congress for preservation into the National Recording Registry as a "culturally, historically, or aesthetically significant" work.

== Background ==
Patti Smith and her backing band gave frequent live performances throughout 1974, and by the following year they had established themselves as a popular act within the New York City underground rock music scene, especially elevated in early 1975 by their highly attended two-month residency at the New York City club CBGB with the band Television. The hype surrounding the residency brought Smith to the attention of music industry executive Clive Davis, who was scouting for artists to sign to his recently launched label Arista Records. After being impressed by one of her live performances at CBGB, Davis offered Smith a seven-album recording deal with Arista, and she signed to the label in April 1975.

Smith had written poetry for several years before becoming a musician, and entered the music industry because she thought "the presentation of poetry wasn't vibrant enough". For her debut album, her primary aim was to merge poetry and rock music, which then developed into a "larger mission" to "pump blood back into the heart of rock'n'roll". The title Horses reflected Smith's desire for a rejuvenation of rock music, which she found had grown "calm" in reaction to the social turmoil of the 1960s and the deaths of numerous prominent rock musicians of that era. "Psychologically, somewhere in our hearts," she stated shortly after the album's release, "we were all screwed up because those people died ... We all had to pull ourselves together. To me, that's why our record's called Horses. We had to pull the reins on ourselves to recharge ourselves ... We've gotten ourselves back together. It's time to let the horses loose again. We're ready to start moving again."

Smith later reflected that she had envisioned Horses as a record bridging the "great artists that we had just lost" and the next generation of rockers, who she hoped would "be less materialistic, more bonded with the people and not so glamorous", and that from a more humanistic perspective, she had also aimed "to reach out to other disenfranchised people" like herself. Smith said, "I was consciously trying to make a record that would make a certain type of person not feel alone. People who were like me, different ... I wasn't targeting the whole world. I wasn't trying to make a hit record."

== Recording ==
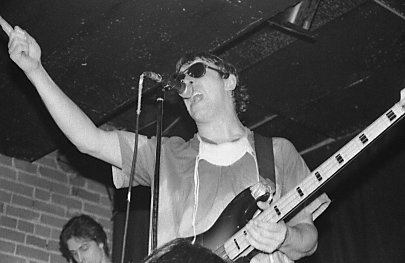
John Cale (pictured in 1980) was chosen by Smith to produce Horses.

Arista arranged for Smith to begin recording her debut album in August 1975. At Smith's suggestion, the label planned to book studio time for Smith with producer Tom Dowd at Criteria in Miami, but Dowd's close association with rival label Atlantic Records stalled these plans. Smith had a change of heart and instead set out to enlist Welsh musician John Cale, formerly of the New York City rock band the Velvet Underground, to produce Horses after she was impressed by the raw sound of his solo albums, such as 1974's Fear. Cale accepted, already familiar with Smith's band and being acquainted with the band's bassist Ivan Král.

Horses was recorded at Electric Lady Studios in New York City, with Smith retaining the same backing band with whom she performed live at the time—Jay Dee Daugherty on drums, Lenny Kaye on guitar, Ivan Král on bass guitar, and Richard Sohl on keyboards. For the album, Smith and her band recorded several songs that were already fixtures of their sets at CBGB, including "Gloria", "Redondo Beach", "Birdland", and "Land". Allen Lanier of Blue Öyster Cult and Tom Verlaine of Television participated in the recording sessions as guest musicians, performing on the songs "Elegie" and "Break It Up", respectively.

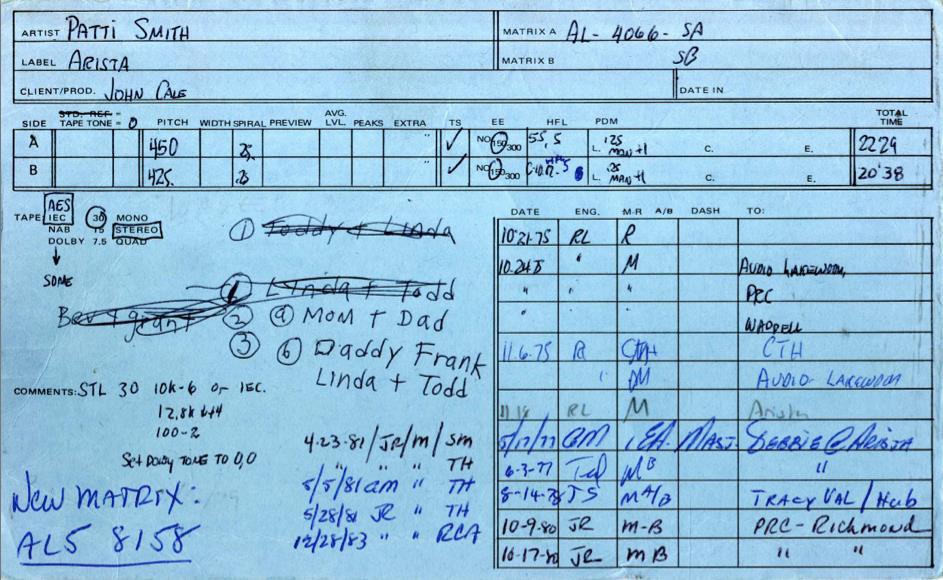
A cutting card from the Horses recording sessions

The first studio session was held on September 2. Cale later recalled that the band initially "sounded awful" and played out of tune due to their use of damaged instruments, compelling him to procure the band new instruments before commencing recording. The differences between the work process of Cale, who was an experienced recording artist, and the process of Smith, who at that point was primarily a live performer, became apparent in the early stages of recording and were a source of tension between the two artists, who frequently clashed in the studio. Lenny Kaye also highlighted the irreconcilable differences between their musical visions for the album, with Cale picturing "a more arranged record, one fleshed out with intriguing sound palettes and melodic lines", and Smith and her band preferring a more spontaneous approach to playing their material, akin to their live performances. The final album was ultimately informed by both perspectives, making use of multitracking and overdubbing on its more structured songs, while still capturing the musical improvisation that typified the band's live act. Cale wished to augment the band's approach on certain songs with string instruments, but Smith vehemently opposed this idea. Lanier, who was Smith's boyfriend at the time, did not get along with Cale, nor—particularly so—with Verlaine, who had previously dated Smith. This tension culminated with Lanier and Verlaine getting into a physical altercation during the final session, held on September 18.

For several years after the album's release, Smith often downplayed Cale's contributions to Horses and suggested that she and her band had ignored his suggestions entirely. In a 1976 interview with Rolling Stone, Smith described her experience:

My picking John was about as arbitrary as picking Rimbaud. I saw the cover of Illuminations with Rimbaud's face, y'know, he looked so cool, just like Bob Dylan. So Rimbaud became my favorite poet. I looked at the cover of Fear and I said, 'Now there's a set of cheekbones.' In my mind I picked him because his records sounded good. But I hired the wrong guy. All I was really looking for was a technical person. Instead, I got a total maniac artist. I went to pick out an expensive watercolor painting and instead I got a mirror. It was really like A Season in Hell, for both of us. But inspiration doesn't always have to be someone sending me half a dozen American Beauty roses. There's a lotta inspiration going on between the murderer and the victim. And he had me so nuts I wound up doing this nine-minute cut that transcended anything I ever did before.

Cale said in 1996 that Smith initially struck him as "someone with an incredibly volatile mouth who could handle any situation", and that as producer on Horses he wanted to capture the energy of her live performances, noting that there "was a lot of power in Patti's use of language, in the way images collided with one another." He likened their working relationship during recording to "an immutable force meeting an immovable object." Smith would later attribute much of the tension between herself and Cale to her inexperience with formal studio recording, recalling that she was "very, very suspicious, very guarded and hard to work with" and "made it difficult for him to do some of the things he had to do." She expressed gratitude for Cale's persistence in working with her and her band, and found that his production made the most out of their "adolescent and honest flaws".

== Musical style ==
"Gloria"
"Gloria" relies on a simple progression of three chords (E major, D major, and A major).

Smith characterized Horses as "three-chord rock merged with the power of the word". Consequence's Lior Phillips noted that the minimalist quality of the album's music "matched the tone of" the nascent punk rock genre, which had emerged in New York City in the mid-1970s, and counted Smith, Television, and fellow CBGB regulars such as the Ramones as practitioners. Author Joe Tarr identified a punk sensibility in the music's reliance on simple chord progressions, and William Ruhlmann of AllMusic also cited Lenny Kaye's rudimentary guitar playing and the "anarchic spirit" of Smith's vocals as being representative of punk. Tarr wrote that the band "proudly flaunted a garage rock aesthetic" on Horses, while Smith "sang with the delirious release of an inspired amateur", emphasizing "honest passion" over technical proficiency. Smith's vocals on the album alternate between being sung and spoken, an approach that, according to Peter Murphy of Hot Press, "challenged the very notion of a demarcation" between the two forms.

AllMusic critic Steve Huey observed that Horses borrowed ideas from the avant-garde, with the music showcasing the band's free jazz-inspired interplay and improvisation, while still remaining "firmly rooted in primal three-chord rock & roll." He called Horses "essentially the first art punk album." Smith and her band's musical improvisation differentiated them from most of their punk contemporaries, whose songs rarely diverged from straightforward three-chord structures. Throughout Horses, they also tempered their punk sound with elements of other musical styles, balancing more conventional rock songs with excursions into reggae ("Redondo Beach") and jazz ("Birdland").

== Lyrics ==
Fiona Sturges of The Guardian described Smith's lyrics on Horses as being steeped in "intricate phrasing and imagery" that "deliberately blurred the lines between punk and poetry", while CMJ writer Steve Klinge found that they recalled the energy of Beat poetry and the "revolutionary spirit" of French poet Arthur Rimbaud, one of Smith's primary influences. Smith drew on different sources of lyrical inspiration for Horses, with some songs being autobiographical and others being rooted in dreams and fantastical scenarios. She left the genders of the songs' protagonists ambiguous, a stylistic choice she said was "learnt from Joan Baez, who often sang songs that had a male point of view", while also serving as a declaration "that as an artist, I can take any position, any voice, that I want."

Smith's experiences with her family inspired specific songs on Horses. "Redondo Beach", whose lyrics concern a woman who commits suicide following a quarrel with the song's narrator, was written by Smith after an incident involving her and her sister Linda. The two had gotten into a heated argument, prompting Linda to leave their shared apartment and not return until the next day. "Kimberly" is a dedication to its namesake, Smith's younger sister, and finds the singer recounting a childhood memory of holding Kimberly in her arms during a lightning storm. In "Free Money", Smith describes growing up in poverty in New Jersey and recalls her mother fantasizing about winning the lottery.

Other songs were penned by Smith about notable public figures. "Birdland" was inspired by A Book of Dreams, a 1973 memoir of Austrian psychoanalyst Wilhelm Reich by his son Peter, and revolves around a narrative in which Peter, at his father's funeral, imagines leaving on a UFO piloted by his father's spirit. "Break It Up" was written about Jim Morrison, lead singer of the Doors; its lyrics are based on Smith's recollection of her visit to Morrison's grave in Père Lachaise Cemetery, as well as a dream in which she witnessed a winged Morrison stuck to a marble slab, trying and eventually succeeding in breaking free from the stone. "Elegie" is a requiem for rock musician Jimi Hendrix and quotes a line from his 1968 song "1983... (A Merman I Should Turn to Be)". It was recorded, at Smith's request, on the fifth anniversary of Hendrix's death, which fell on September 18, the final day of recording. Smith said that the song was also intended to pay tribute to other deceased rock artists such as Jim Morrison, Brian Jones, and Janis Joplin.

Two songs on Horses are partial adaptations of rock standards: "Gloria", a radical reimagining of the 1964 Them song incorporating verses from Smith's own poem "Oath", and "Land", which features the first verse of Chris Kenner's 1962 song "Land of a Thousand Dances". In "Land", Smith weaves the imagery of the Kenner song into an elaborate narrative about a character named Johnny—an allusion to the similarly named homoerotic protagonist of the 1971 William S. Burroughs novel The Wild Boys—while additionally referencing Arthur Rimbaud and, indirectly, Jimi Hendrix, whom Smith imagined to be the song's protagonist, "dreaming a simple rock-and-roll song, and it takes him into all these other realms." The characterization of Johnny in "Land" was also inspired by photographer Robert Mapplethorpe—who was a close friend of Smith and shot the picture of her used for the Horses album cover—and his experiences in the New York S&M scene; in her memoir Just Kids (2010), Smith refers to Mapplethorpe and Burroughs, sitting together in CBGB, as "Johnny and the horse".

== Artwork ==
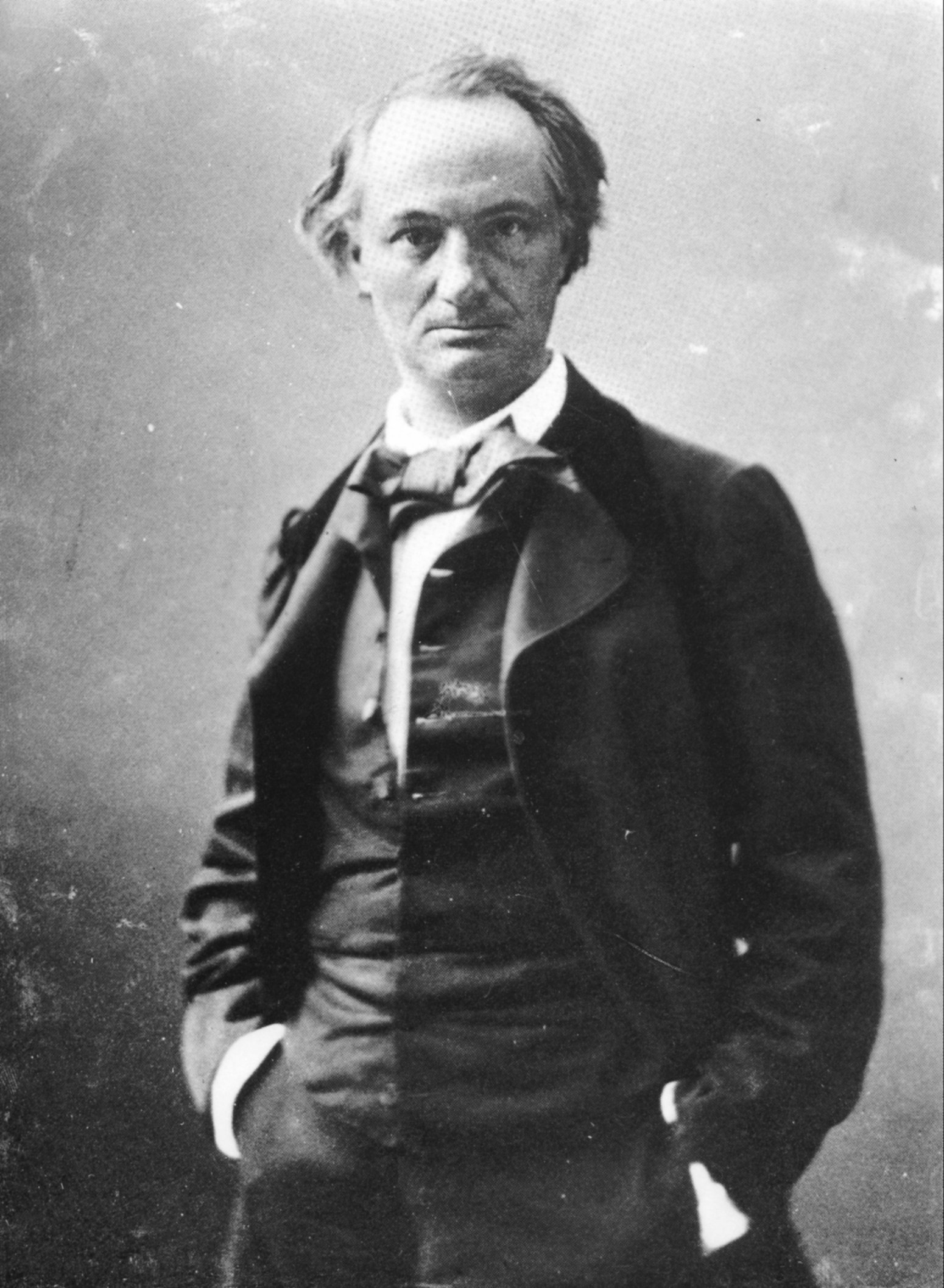
Photograph (c. 1855) of Charles Baudelaire, whose fashion Smith emulated in the Horses cover photograph

The cover photograph for Horses was taken by Robert Mapplethorpe at the Greenwich Village penthouse apartment of his partner Sam Wagstaff. Smith, shrouded in natural light, is seen wearing a plain white shirt, which she had purchased at a Salvation Army shop on the Bowery, and slinging a black jacket over her shoulder and her favorite black ribbon around her collar. Embedded on the jacket is a horse pin that Allen Lanier had given her. Smith described her appearance as recalling those of French poet Charles Baudelaire and, in the slinging of the jacket, American singer and actor Frank Sinatra. She recounted that Mapplethorpe "took, like, twelve pictures, and at about the eighth one, he said, 'I have it.' I said, 'How do you know?' and he said, 'I just know,' and I said, 'Okay.' And that was it."

The black-and-white treatment and androgynous pose were a departure from the typical promotional images of female singers of the time. Arista executives wanted to make various changes to the photograph, but Smith overruled their suggestions. Clive Davis wrote in 2013 that he was initially conflicted about the image, recognizing its "power" but feeling that it would confuse audiences unfamiliar with Smith and her style of music. He put aside his reservations and approved the cover after realizing that he needed "to trust her artistic instincts thoroughly".

Feminist writer Camille Paglia later referred to the Horses cover photograph as "one of the greatest pictures ever taken of a woman." In 2017, World Cafe presenter Talia Schlanger wrote that "Smith's unapologetic androgyny predates a time when that was an en vogue or even available option for women, and represents a seminal moment in the reversal of the female gaze. Smith is looking at you, and could care less [sic] what you think about looking at her. That was radical for a woman in 1975. It is still radical today." Smith herself stated that she had not intended to make a "big statement" with the cover, which she said simply reflected the way she dressed. "I wasn't thinking that I was going to break any boundaries. I just like dressing like Baudelaire," she remarked in 1996.

== Release ==
=== Promotion and sales ===
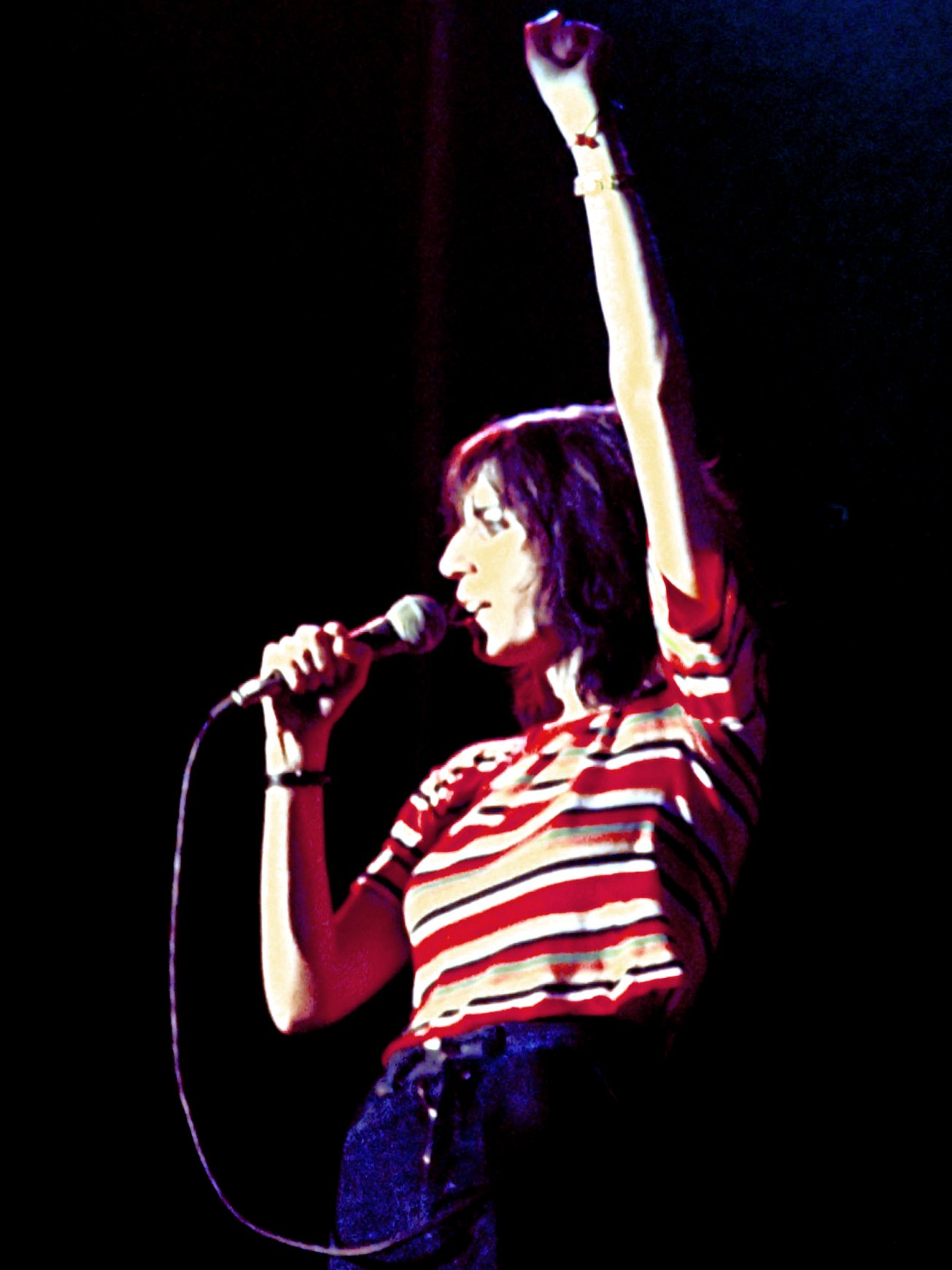
Smith performing in Copenhagen, Denmark in 1976

On September 18, 1975, the same day that they finished recording Horses, Smith and her band performed a promotional live concert at an Arista convention held at the New York City Center, where they were personally introduced by Clive Davis. They previewed five songs from the album: "Birdland", "Redondo Beach", "Break It Up", "Land", and, as their encore, "Free Money". Lisa Robinson reported afterward in NME that the "stupendous, truly exciting" performance was met with a highly ecstatic response from the Arista executives in attendance.

Horses was released on November 10, 1975. Smith had originally requested for the album to be issued on October 20, the birthday of Arthur Rimbaud, but due to a shortage of vinyl, the release date was postponed, in what Smith described as a "magical" coincidence, to November 10, the anniversary of Rimbaud's death. Commercially, it performed respectably for a debut album, despite receiving little radio airplay. In the United States, Horses peaked at number 47 on the Billboard 200 album chart, remaining on the chart for 17 weeks. The album also managed chart placings in Australia, where it reached number 80; Canada, where it reached number 52; and the Netherlands, where it reached number 18. To promote Horses, Smith and her band toured the US and made their network television debut performing on the NBC variety show Saturday Night Live, then traveled to Europe for an appearance on the BBC Two music show The Old Grey Whistle Test and a short tour. "Gloria" was released as a single in April 1976. Smith's cover of the Who's "My Generation", performed live in Cleveland, served as the single's B-side.

=== Critical reception ===
Horses was met with near-universal acclaim from critics. Music journalist Mary Anne Cassata said that it was roundly hailed as "one of the most original first albums ever recorded." Reviewing the album for Rolling Stone, John Rockwell wrote that Horses is "wonderful in large measure because it recognizes the overwhelming importance of words" in Smith's work, covering a range of themes "far beyond what most rock records even dream of." Rockwell highlighted Smith's adaptations of "Gloria" and "Land of a Thousand Dances" as the most striking moments on the record, finding that she had rendered the songs "far more expansive than their original creators could have dreamed." In Creem, Lester Bangs wrote that Smith's music "in its ultimate moments touches deep wellsprings of emotion that extremely few artists in rock or anywhere else are capable of reaching", and declared that with "her wealth of promise and the most incandescent flights and stillnesses of this album she joins the ranks of people like Miles Davis, Charles Mingus, or the Dylan of 'Sad Eyed Lady' and Royal Albert Hall." The Village Voice's Robert Christgau said that while the album does not capture Smith's humor, it "gets the minimalist fury of her band and the revolutionary dimension of her singing just fine."

In the British music press, Horses had some detractors. Street Life reviewer Angus MacKinnon found that the album's minimalist sound merely reflected Smith and her band's musical incompetence. Steve Lake derided the album in Melody Maker as an embodiment of "precisely what's wrong with rock and roll right now", panning it as "completely contrived 'amateurism'" with a "'so bad it's good' aesthetic". Conversely, Jonh Ingham of Sounds penned a five-star review of Horses, naming it "the record of the year" and "one of the most stunning, commanding, engrossing platters to come down the turnpike since John Lennon's Plastic Ono Band". NME critic Charles Shaar Murray called it "an album in a thousand" and "an important album in terms of what rock can encompass without losing its identity as a musical form, in that it introduces an artist of greater vision than has been seen in rock for far too long." English television host and future Factory Records co-founder Tony Wilson was so enthused by the record that he made repeated attempts to book Smith and her band for an appearance on his Granada Television program So It Goes.

At the end of 1975, Horses was voted the second-best album of the year, behind Bob Dylan and the Band's The Basement Tapes, in the Pazz & Jop, an annual poll of American critics published in The Village Voice. NME placed Horses at number 13 on its year-end list of 1975's best albums. According to writer Philip Shaw in his 33⅓ book profiling the album, the enthusiastic reaction to Horses from the music press quickly assuaged observers' suspicions that Smith had sold out by signing to a major label. The album's sales were aided by the positive critical reception, along with substantial promotional efforts by Arista.

== Legacy and influence ==
Retrospective professional ratings
Review scores
Source	Rating
AllMusic	5/5 stars
Chicago Tribune	4/4 stars
Christgau's Record Guide	A
Mojo	5/5 stars
NME	9/10
Pitchfork	10/10
Q	5/5 stars
The Rolling Stone Album Guide	5/5 stars
Spin	5/5 stars
Uncut	10/10

Horses cemented Smith's reputation as a central figure of the New York City punk rock scene. It has frequently been cited as the first punk rock album, as well as one of the key recordings of the punk movement, appearing in professional lists of the best punk albums of all time. "Pipping the Ramones' first album to the post by five months," Simon Reynolds wrote in The Observer, "Horses is generally considered not just one of the most startling debuts in rock history but the spark that ignited the punk explosion." Horses has been described as a landmark for both punk and its offshoot genre new wave, inspiring "a raw, almost amateurish energy for the former and critical, engaging reflexivity for the latter", according to Chris Smith in his book 101 Albums That Changed Popular Music (2009). Philip Shaw stated that the album "created the template" for subsequent rock music of an "intelligent and self-conscious, yet visceral and exciting" sensibility, identifying its influence on the alternative rock, indie rock, and grunge movements that followed the punk era. Variety critic David Sprague further noted that "Horses—which became the first major-label punk-rock album when Arista unleashed it in 1975—not only helped spread the gospel of Bowery art-punk around the world, it set the tone for smart, unbending female rockers of generations to come." "Horses was hard to enjoy, but I think that was the point. Having been squired by Rolling Stone, whose '60s-centric sensibility was much of what Smith took aim at, I probably had a similar initial reaction ... that critics swaddled in the Beatles and Stones did", reflected NPR's Charlie Kaplan, who over time came to view it as "a great work, even despite its weaknesses ... I still feel the chill of Patti Smith's suspicious gaze when I look at the cover of Horses, but now I feel like I can explain it a little better."

Various musicians have credited Horses as an influence. Viv Albertine of the Slits said that the album "absolutely and completely changed" her life, adding: "Us girls never stood in front of a mirror posing as if we had a guitar because we had no role models. So, when Patti Smith came along, it was huge. She was groundbreakingly different." Siouxsie and the Banshees frontwoman Siouxsie Sioux, naming "Land" as a recording she considered particularly influential on her, remarked that "apart from Nico, Patti was the first real female writer in rock." R.E.M.'s Michael Stipe bought a copy of Horses as a high school student and later stated that the album "tore [his] limbs off and put them back on in a whole different order", citing Smith as his primary inspiration for becoming a musician. Similarly, his R.E.M. bandmate Peter Buck cited attending the four Atlanta shows Smith played on her first US tour as the moment he started to seriously consider forming a group. Morrissey and Johnny Marr shared an appreciation for the record, and one of their early compositions for the Smiths, "The Hand That Rocks the Cradle", uses a melody based on that of "Kimberly". Courtney Love of Hole recounted that listening to Horses as a teenager helped encourage her to pursue a career in rock music, while PJ Harvey recalled hearing the album and finding it "brilliant—not so much her music but her delivery, words, and her articulation. Her honesty." KT Tunstall wrote her hit single "Suddenly I See" (2004) about how she felt inspired to embrace her musical ambitions after seeing Smith on the cover of Horses.

Horses has often been named by music critics as one of the all-time greatest albums. Lars Brandle of Billboard wrote that the album had come to be regarded as "one of the finest in recorded music history." In 2003 and 2012, Horses was ranked at number 44 on Rolling Stone's list of the 500 greatest albums of all time, later placing at number 26 on a 2020 updated list. NME named it the 12th-greatest album of all time in a similar list published in 2013. In 2006, Time named Horses as one of the "All-Time 100 Albums", and The Observer listed it as one of 50 albums that changed music history. Three years later, the album was preserved by the Library of Congress into the National Recording Registry for being "culturally, historically, or aesthetically significant". Horses was also inducted into the Grammy Hall of Fame in 2021.

For the 30th anniversary of Horses, the full album was performed live by Smith on June 25, 2005 at the Royal Festival Hall, during the Meltdown festival, which Smith curated. She was backed by original band members Lenny Kaye and Jay Dee Daugherty, as well as Tony Shanahan on bass guitar and piano, Tom Verlaine on guitar, and Flea on bass guitar and trumpet. In 2015, Smith performed Horses in its entirety at a series of concerts celebrating its 40th anniversary. The 30th-anniversary performance was released on November 8, 2005 as the second disc of a double CD titled Horses/Horses, with the digitally remastered version of the original 1975 album, along with the bonus track "My Generation", on the first disc. For the release, the live set was recorded by Emery Dobyns and mixed by Dobyns and Shanahan. To celebrate its 50th anniversary, Horses was reissued on October 10, 2025 as a double-disc set on CD and LP, with the first disc containing the remastered album and the second disc comprising previously unreleased outtakes and rarities, including demos that Smith had recorded for a 1975 audition tape for RCA Records. The original album has also been reissued in remastered form several other times, including on June 18, 1996 (both as a standalone CD and as part of the CD box set The Patti Smith Masters), and on April 21, 2012, on LP for that year's Record Store Day celebration.

== Track listing ==
Side one
No.	Title	Writer(s)	Length
1.	"Gloria" (part one: "In Excelsis Deo" / part two: "Gloria (Version)")	Patti Smith (part one); Van Morrison (part two)	5:54
2.	"Redondo Beach"	Smith; Richard Sohl; Lenny Kaye	3:24
3.	"Birdland"	Smith; Sohl; Kaye; Ivan Král	9:16
4.	"Free Money"	Smith; Kaye	3:47
Total length:			22:21

Side two
No.	Title	Writer(s)	Length
1.	"Kimberly"	Smith; Allen Lanier; Král	4:26
2.	"Break It Up"	Smith; Tom Verlaine	4:05
3.	"Land" (part one: "Horses" / part two: "Land of a Thousand Dances" / part three: "La Mer(de)")	Smith (parts one and three); Chris Kenner (part two); Antoine Domino (part two)	9:36
4.	"Elegie"	Smith; Lanier	2:42
Total length:			20:49

CD reissue bonus track
No.	Title	Writer(s)	Length
9.	"My Generation" (live at the Agora, Cleveland, Ohio, January 26, 1976)	Pete Townshend	3:16
Total length:			46:09

Horses/Horses live bonus disc
No.	Title	Writer(s)	Length
1.	"Gloria" (part one: "In Excelsis Deo" / part two: "Gloria (Version)")	Smith (part one); Morrison (part two)	7:00
2.	"Redondo Beach"	Smith; Sohl; Kaye	4:29
3.	"Birdland"	Smith; Sohl; Kaye; Král	9:52
4.	"Free Money"	Smith; Kaye	5:29
5.	"Kimberly"	Smith; Lanier; Král	5:29
6.	"Break It Up"	Smith; Verlaine	5:23
7.	"Land" (part one: "Horses" / part two: "Land of a Thousand Dances" / part three: "La Mer(de)")	Smith (parts one and three); Kenner (part two)	17:35
8.	"Elegie"	Smith; Lanier	4:59
9.	"My Generation"	Townshend	6:59
Total length:			67:15

50th anniversary edition bonus disc
No.	Title	Writer(s)	Length
1.	"Gloria" (RCA demo; part one: "In Excelsis Deo" / part two: "Gloria (Version)")	Smith (part one); Morrison (part two)	6:20
2.	"Redondo Beach" (RCA demo)	Smith; Sohl; Kaye	3:46
3.	"Birdland" (alternate take)	Smith; Sohl; Kaye; Král	5:54
4.	"Snowball" (outtake)	Smith; Kaye	3:14
5.	"Kimberly" (alternate take)	Smith; Lanier; Král	4:11
6.	"Break It Up" (alternate take)	Smith; Verlaine	3:44
7.	"Distant Fingers" (outtake)	Smith; Lanier	3:46
8.	"The Hunter Gets Captured by the Game" (outtake)	Smokey Robinson	2:56
9.	"We Three" (outtake)	Smith	4:34
Total length:			38:25

Notes

- On CD reissues of the album, Chris Kenner is credited as the sole writer of part two of "Land" ("Land of a Thousand Dances").

== Personnel ==
Credits are adapted from the album's liner notes.

Band

- Patti Smith – vocals
- Jay Dee Daugherty – drums
- Lenny Kaye – lead guitar
- Ivan Král – guitar, bass
- Richard Sohl – piano

Additional personnel

- John Cale – production
- Frank D'Augusta – engineering (assistant)
- Bob Heimall – design
- Bernie Kirsh – engineering, mastering
- Allen Lanier – guitar on "Elegie"
- Bob Ludwig – mastering
- Robert Mapplethorpe – photography
- Tom Verlaine – guitar on "Break It Up"

== Charts ==
Chart (1975–1976)	Peak position
Australian Albums (Kent Music Report)	80
Canada Top Albums/CDs (RPM)	52
Dutch Albums (Album Top 100)	18
US Billboard 200	47

Chart (2007–2025)	Peak position
Belgian Albums (Ultratop Flanders)	93
Belgian Albums (Ultratop Wallonia)	135
Japanese Albums (Oricon)	200
Scottish Albums (Official Charts)	20
Swiss Albums (Schweizer Hitparade)	64
UK Albums (Official Charts)	157

== Certifications ==
Region	Certification	Certified units/sales
Australia (ARIA)	Gold	35,000^{^}
United Kingdom (BPI) sales since 1993	Gold	100,000^{*}
^{*} Sales figures based on certification alone.^{^} Shipments figures based on certification alone.

== Bibliography ==
- Abowitz, Richard (2004). "Patti Smith". In Brackett, Nathan; Hoard, Christian (eds.). The New Rolling Stone Album Guide (4th ed.). Simon & Schuster. ISBN 0-7432-0169-8.
- Christgau, Robert (1981). "Patti Smith: Horses". Christgau's Record Guide: Rock Albums of the Seventies. Ticknor and Fields. ISBN 0-89919-026-X.
- Davis, Clive; DeCurtis, Anthony (2013). The Soundtrack of My Life. Simon & Schuster. ISBN 978-1-4767-1480-6.
- Goddard, Simon (2006). The Smiths: Songs That Saved Your Life (3rd ed.). Reynolds & Hearn. ISBN 1-905287-14-3.
- Heylin, Clinton (1996). "Ten Bootlegs That Illustrate the Origins of Punk". In Schinder, Scott (ed.). Rolling Stone's Alt-Rock-a-Rama. Delta. ISBN 0-385-31360-8.
- Howard, David N. (2004). Sonic Alchemy: Visionary Music Producers and Their Maverick Recordings. Hal Leonard Corporation. ISBN 0-634-05560-7.
- Johnstone, Nick (2012). Patti Smith: A Biography. Music Sales Group. ISBN 978-0-85712-778-5.
- Kent, David (1993). Australian Chart Book 1970–1992 (illustrated ed.). Australian Chart Book. ISBN 0-646-11917-6.
- Morrisroe, Patricia (1995). Mapplethorpe: A Biography. Random House. ISBN 0-394-57650-0.
- Padgett, Ray (2017). Cover Me: The Stories Behind the Greatest Cover Songs of All Time. Sterling Publishing. ISBN 978-1-4549-2250-6. OCLC 978537907.
- Paglia, Camille (1992). Sex, Art and American Culture: New Essays. Vintage Books. ISBN 0-679-74101-1.
- Paytress, Mark (2006). Break It Up: Patti Smith's Horses and the Remaking of Rock 'n' Roll. Piatkus Books. ISBN 0-7499-5107-9.
- Shaw, Philip (2008). Horses. 33⅓. Continuum International Publishing Group. ISBN 978-0-8264-2792-2.
- Smith, Chris (2009). 101 Albums That Changed Popular Music. Oxford University Press. ISBN 978-0-19-537371-4.
- Smith, Patti (2010b). Just Kids. A & C Black. ISBN 978-0-06-093622-8.
- Strong, Martin C. (1995). "Patti Smith". The Great Rock Discography (2nd ed.). Canongate Books. ISBN 0-86241-385-0.
- Tarr, Joe (2008). The Words and Music of Patti Smith. The Praeger Singer-Songwriter Collection. Praeger Publishers. ISBN 978-0-275-99411-2.
- Thompson, Dave (2011). Dancing Barefoot: The Patti Smith Story. Chicago Review Press. ISBN 978-1-56976-325-4.
- Thorgerson, Storm; Powell, Aubrey (1999). 100 Best Album Covers: The Stories Behind the Sleeves (1st American ed.). Dorling Kindersley. ISBN 0-7894-4951-X.
- Wendell, Eric (2014). Patti Smith: America's Punk Rock Rhapsodist. Rowman & Littlefield. ISBN 978-0-8108-8690-2.
