= Ask the Angels =

Single by Patti Smith Group

from the album Radio Ethiopia
- B-side: "Time Is on My Side" (Live)
- Released: 1977
- Recorded: Record Plant Studios, 1976
- Length: 3:07
- Label: Arista
- Songwriter(s): Patti Smith, Ivan Král
- Producer(s): Jack Douglas

Patti Smith singles chronology
"Pumping (My Heart)" (1976)	"Ask the Angels" (1977)	"Because the Night" (1978)

"Ask the Angels" is a rock song written by Patti Smith and Ivan Král, and released as a third single from Patti Smith Group 1976 album Radio Ethiopia. In 2000 The Distillers released a cover of the song on their debut album. Chemical People released a cover on their 1990 EP Angels & Devils.
