= Easter (Patti Smith Group album) =

Studio album by Patti Smith Group
- Released: March 3, 1978
- Recorded: August–September 1977
- Studio: Record Plant, New York City, New York; House of Music, West Orange, New Jersey
- Genre: Rock
- Length: 39:44
- Label: Arista
- Producer: Jimmy Iovine

Patti Smith Group chronology
Radio Ethiopia (1976)	Easter (1978)	Wave (1979)

Singles from Easter
- 1. "Because the Night" Released: March 2, 1978; 2. "Privilege (Set Me Free)" Released: 1978

Easter is the third studio album by American musician Patti Smith, and the second release where her backing band Patti Smith Group is billed. It was released in March 1978 by Arista Records. Produced by Jimmy Iovine, the album is regarded as the group's commercial breakthrough, owing to the success of the single "Because the Night" (co-written by Bruce Springsteen and Smith), which reached number 13 on the Billboard Hot 100 and number five on the UK Singles Chart.

== History ==
The first album released since Smith had suffered a neck injury while touring for Radio Ethiopia, Easter has been called the most commercially accessible of the Patti Smith Group's catalogue. Unlike its two predecessors, Easter incorporated a diversity of musical styles, including straightforward rock ("Because the Night"), classic rock and roll ("25th Floor/High on Rebellion", "Rock N Roll Nigger"), folk ("Ghost Dance") and spoken word ("Babelogue"). Easter is the only 1970s album of Smith's that does not feature Richard Sohl as part of the Patti Smith Group; in one interview at the time, Smith stated that Sohl was sick and this prevented him from participating in recording the album. Bruce Brody is credited as the keyboard player, though Sohl makes a guest appearance contributing keyboards to "Space Monkey", along with Blue Öyster Cult keyboardist Allen Lanier. The cover photograph is by Lynn Goldsmith and the liner notes photography by Cindy Black and Robert Mapplethorpe.

== Critical reception ==
Retrospective professional ratings
Review scores
Source	Rating
AllMusic	4.5/5 stars
Chicago Tribune	3.5/4 stars
Christgau's Record Guide	A−
Los Angeles Times	4/4 stars
Mojo	4/5 stars
Pitchfork	8.8/10
Q	4/5 stars
The Rolling Stone Album Guide	4.5/5 stars
Spin	4.5/5 stars
Spin Alternative Record Guide	6/10

Easter was highly acclaimed upon its release. Rolling Stone critic Dave Marsh called it "transcendent and fulfilled", while Sandy Robertson proclaimed that "the rock 'n' roll resurrection is upon us" in his review of the album for Sounds. In Creem, Nick Tosches deemed Easter to be Smith's best work, "truer and surer and less uneven than her previous albums". Robert Christgau of The Village Voice felt that the music "is as basic as ever in its instrumentation and rhythmic thrust, but grander, more martial", and that "most of these songs are rousing in the way they're meant to be." Lester Bangs, however, began his review of the album in Phonograph Record, "Dear Patti, start the revolution without me", and contended that while Horses had changed his life, Easter "is just a very good album". The Globe and Mail called the album "as terse and sculpted a rock 'n' roll statement as the band had made to that point." Easter placed at number 14 in The Village Voice's Pazz & Jop critics' poll of the best albums of 1978, while NME ranked it the 46th best album of the year.

== Track listing ==
Side one
No.	Title	Writer(s)	Length
1.	"Till Victory"	Patti Smith; Lenny Kaye	2:45
2.	"Space Monkey"	Smith; Ivan Král; Tom Verlaine	4:04
3.	"Because the Night"	Smith; Bruce Springsteen	3:32
4.	"Ghost Dance"	Smith; Kaye	4:40
5.	"Babelogue"	Smith	1:25
6.	"Rock N Roll Nigger"	Smith; Kaye	3:13

Side two
No.	Title	Writer(s)	Length
7.	"Privilege (Set Me Free)"	Mel London; Mike Leander; Psalm 23	3:27
8.	"We Three"	Smith	4:19
9.	"25th Floor"	Smith; Král	4:01
10.	"High on Rebellion"	Smith	2:37
11.	"Easter"	Smith; Jay Dee Daugherty	6:15

1996 CD reissue bonus track
No.	Title	Writer(s)	Length
12.	"Godspeed"	Smith; Král	6:09

== Personnel ==
Patti Smith Group

- Patti Smith – vocals, Duo-Sonic guitar
- Lenny Kaye – Stratocaster guitar, bass guitar, vocals
- Jay Dee Daugherty – drums, percussion
- Ivan Král – bass guitar, vocals, Les Paul guitar
- Bruce Brody – keyboards, synthesizer

Additional personnel

- Richard Sohl – keyboards on "Space Monkey"
- Allen Lanier – keyboards on "Space Monkey"
- John Paul Fetta – bass guitar on "Till Victory" and "Privilege"
- Andi Ostrowe – percussion on "Ghost Dance"
- Jimmy Maxwell – bagpipes on "Easter"
- Tom Verlaine – arrangement on "We Three" (in 1974)
- Todd Smith – head of crew

Technical

- Jimmy Iovine – production, mixing
- Shelly Yakus – mixing
- Greg Calbi – mastering
- Thom Panunzio – engineering
- Gray Russell – engineering
- Charlie Conrad – engineering
- Joe Intile – engineering

Design

- Lynn Goldsmith – cover photography
- Robert Mapplethorpe – insert photography
- Cindy Black – insert photography
- John Roberts – insert photography
- Maude Gilman – insert design

== Liner notes ==
In the insert with the original LP release (reproduced in the 1996 reissue), Smith's self-penned liner notes refer, among other things, to:

- Arthur Rimbaud – 19th century French poet, sometime companion of Paul Verlaine. Lived in Ethiopia for the last 11 years of his life.
- Frédéric Rimbaud – Arthur's brother.
- 42nd Street and Ninth Avenue, New York – 1970s crime-ridden zone.
- Privilege – 1967 British movie.
- Ladies and Gentlemen: The Rolling Stones – A concert movie released in 1974.
- Alain Delon – French actor.
- Pier Paolo Pasolini – 1960s Italian poet and film director.
- Bernardo Bertolucci – 1960s Italian writer and film director.
- Jean-Luc Godard – 1960s Franco-Swiss filmmaker.
- August 16, 1977 – date of Elvis Presley's death.
- Ghost Dance – 19th century religious movement among some Native American tribes.
- r.e.f.m. – Radio Ethiopia Field Marshal.
- Jean Shrimpton – 1960s British model and actress.
- Paul Jones – 1960s British musician and actor.
- Charles Baudelaire – 19th century French poet.
- CBGB – New York music club.
- Little Richard – 20th century American singer-songwriter.
- New Jersey.
- The UN's declaration of 1979 as International Year of the Child.

== Charts ==
Chart (1978)	Peak position
Australian Albums (Kent Music Report)	80
German Albums (Offizielle Top 100)	43
New Zealand Albums (RMNZ)	20
Norwegian Albums (VG-lista)	10
Swedish Albums (Sverigetopplistan)	34
UK Albums (OCC)	16
US Billboard 200	20

Chart (2019)	Peak position
Belgian Albums (Ultratop Flanders)	194

== Certifications and sales ==
Region	Certification	Certified units/sales
France (SNEP)	Gold	100,000^{*}
United Kingdom (BPI)	Silver	60,000^{^}
^{*} Sales figures based on certification alone.^{^} Shipments figures based on certification alone.

== Release history ==
Date	Label	Format	Catalog no.
March 1978	Arista Records	LP	4171
1996	Arista Records	CD	
2007	Sony BMG	CD	37929
2008	Sony BMG	"Original Album Classics" CD box set	88697313832
