= Dancing Barefoot =

1979 single by Patti Smith

Single by Patti Smith Group

from the album Wave
- B-side: "5-4-3-2-1" (Live)
- Released: May 1979
- Recorded: Bearsville Studios
- Length: 4:18
- Label: Arista
- Songwriters: Patti Smith, Ivan Král
- Producer: Todd Rundgren

Patti Smith singles chronology
"Frederick" (1979)	"Dancing Barefoot" (1979)	"So You Want to Be a Rock 'n' Roll Star" (1979)

Audio sample
- file; help

"Dancing Barefoot" is a rock song written by Patti Smith and Ivan Král, and released as a second single from the Patti Smith Group's 1979 album Wave. According to the album sleeve, the song was dedicated to women such as Amedeo Modigliani's mistress Jeanne Hébuterne.

In 2000, a live version was released on the benefit album Broadcasts Vol. 8 from KGSR in Austin, Texas.

In 2010, the song ranked number 331 on Rolling Stone's list of "The 500 Greatest Songs of All Time".

In 2023, the song was used as the opening theme on the television miniseries Daisy Jones & the Six.

== Cover versions ==
- 1986 – The Mission (Extra track on The Mission II, a 12-inch single released in July 1986. Also included on The First Chapter album released in 1987.)
- 1988 – The Celibate Rifles (12-inch EP, bonus track on reissued CD version of Roman Beach Party)
- 1989 – U2 (B-side to the "When Love Comes to Town" single, also on the compilation The Best of 1980–1990; features on the soundtrack of the 1994 movie Threesome; reached number one in Iceland in early 1995)
- 1991 – Xymox (Phoenix)
- 1995 – Johnette Napolitano (Spirit of '73: Rock for Choice)
- 2001 – Simple Minds (Neon Lights)
- 2011 – Shakespears Sister (Cosmic Dancer)
- 2011 – First Aid Kit (Performed for Patti Smith at the Polar Music Prize 2011 during the award ceremony)
