= Richard Sohl =

Richard Arthur Sohl
- Born: May 26, 1953
- Origin: Queens, New York City, U.S.
- Died: June 3, 1990 (aged 37)
- Genres: Rock, punk, protopunk
- Occupations: Pianist, backing vocalist, songwriter
- Instruments: Piano, organ, synthesizer
- Years active: 1974–1988
- Label: Arista

Richard Arthur Sohl (May 26, 1953 – June 3, 1990) was an American pianist, songwriter and arranger, best known for his work with the Patti Smith Group. He also played with Iggy Pop, Nina Hagen and Elliott Murphy. He died on June 3, 1990, of a heart attack while on vacation in Cherry Grove, New York.

Sohl was nicknamed DNV by Lenny Kaye, who thought that he resembled Tadzio, the beautiful Polish boy from Luchino Visconti's Death in Venice, played by Björn Andresen. DNV is an abbreviation of the movie title.
