= Lenny Kaye =

American guitarist, composer, and writer (born 1946)

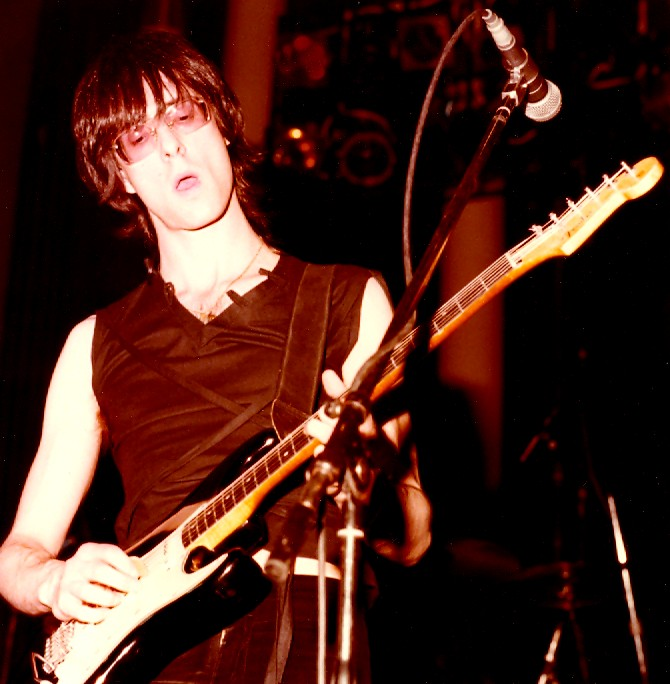
- Kaye performing with Patti Smith in 1978

Background information
- Also known as: Lenny Kaye Connection
- Born: Lenny Kusikoff; December 27, 1946 (age 79)
- Origin: New York City, U.S.
- Genres: Rock; proto-punk; punk; garage rock
- Occupations: Musician; songwriter; record producer; music journalist
- Instruments: Guitar; bass guitar; vocals
- Years active: 1964–present
- Labels: Giorno Poetry Systems; Arista; Columbia
- Website: LennyKaye.com

Lenny Kaye (né Kusikoff; born December 27, 1946) is an American guitarist, composer, and writer, notable for his work with the Patti Smith Group, his contributions to music magazines, and his garage rock retrospective anthology Nuggets.

== Early life and education ==
Kaye was born to Jewish parents in Washington Heights, New York City. His father changed the family name from Kusikoff to Kaye when Lenny was one year old.

As a child, Kaye played the accordion and collected records. He attended high school in North Brunswick, New Jersey. He participated in science fiction fandom and gained experience in writing, publishing his own science fiction fanzine, Obelisk, at the age of 15. His personal collection of fanzines later formed the foundation of the Lenny Kaye Science Fiction Fanzine Library at the University of Miami in Coral Gables, Florida.

Kaye graduated from Rutgers University with a major in American history in 1967. During college he had begun playing in bands at fraternities and other college events.

== Career ==
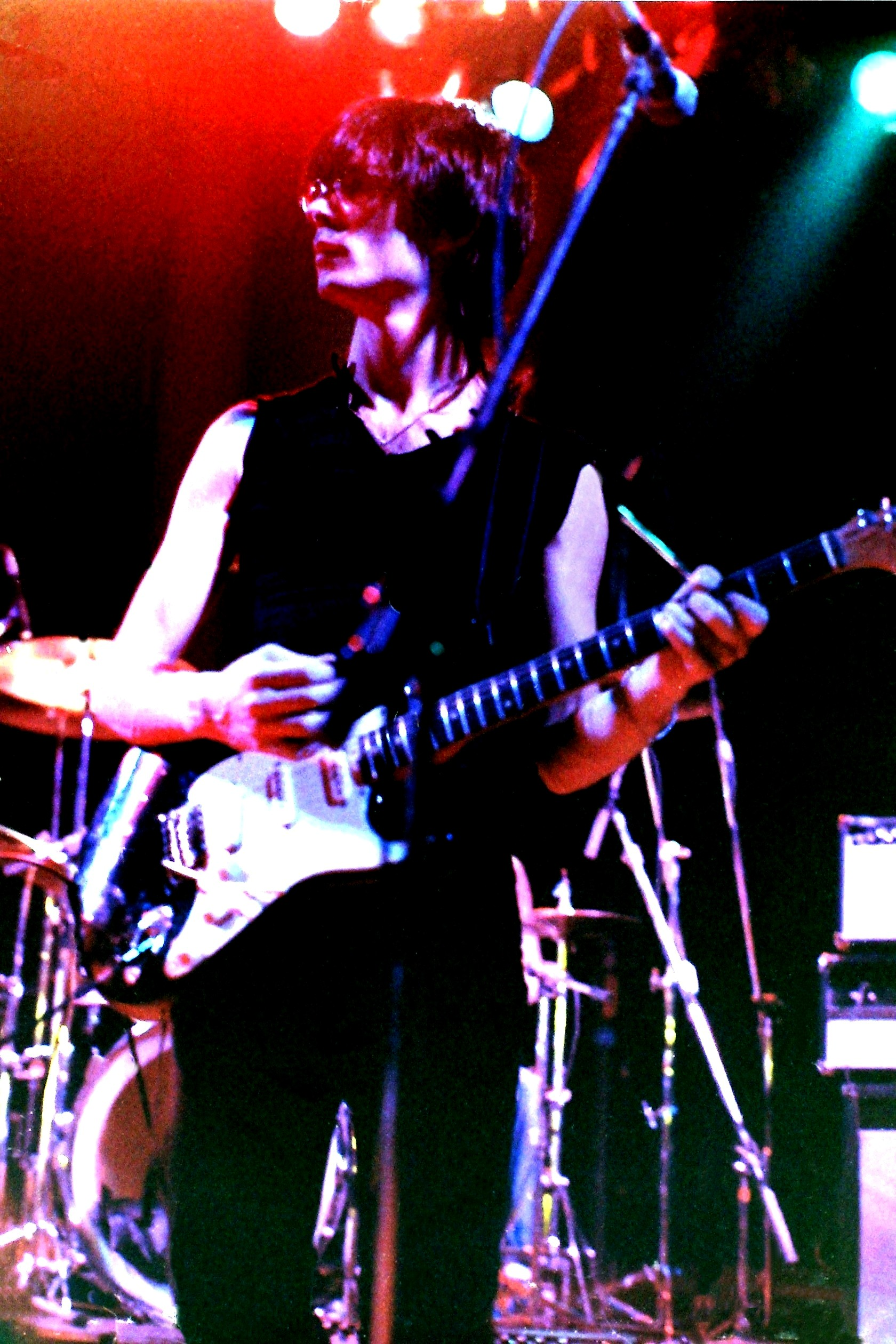
Kaye performing with Patti Smith and her group in Germany in 1979

Kaye's uncle, the songwriter Larry Kusik—who wrote lyrics to "A Time For Us" and "Speak Softly Love"—asked him to sing for the Ritchie Adams song "You Were Mine" in 1965.

Kaye released his first record "Crazy Like A Fox" and its flip side song, "Shock Me" under the name Link Cromwell in March 1966. At the time, he was performing at colleges in New York and Pennsylvania as part of a band named "The Zoo".

He began writing for Jazz & Pop magazine, and later for Fusion, Crawdaddy, Melody Maker, Creem and Rolling Stone. He became music editor for the men's magazine Cavalier and was the New York correspondent for the British magazine Disc.

Kaye formed an artistic partnership with the singer Patti Smith, producing her debut single and contributing to several of her albums. In 1979 Kaye began his own band, Lenny Kaye Connection. Under this name, he released the album I've Got a Right in 1984.

In 1995 he rejoined Patti Smith's band and worked with her on several more albums.

Kaye authored a 1972 anthology of garage rock during the 1960s, Nuggets: Original Artyfacts from the First Psychedelic Era, 1965–1968. With David Dalton, he co-authored the book Rock 100.

In 2010, Kaye contributed a solo recording for Daddy Rockin' Strong: A Tribute to Nolan Strong and the Diablos, released by The Wind/Norton Records. Kaye recorded a version of "I Wanna Know", a 1950s rhythm and blues ballad. He appeared on and wrote one song for the Fleshtones 2011 album Brooklyn Sound Solution, released by Yep Roc. He appeared on the R.E.M. songs "Alligator Aviator Autopilot Antimatter" and "Blue", which appear on the band's 2011 album Collapse into Now.

In mid-February 2018, Kaye took over the night shift on the Underground Garage radio channel, replacing Richard Manitoba.

In mid-July 2026, he released the first album under his own name, Goin' Local.

== Discography ==
- "Crazy Like a Fox" b/w "Shock Me" (as Link Cromwell; Hollywood Records, 1966)
- "Child Bride" b/w "The Tracks of My Tears" (Mer Records, 1980)
- I've Got a Right (Giorno Poetry Systems, 1984)
- Daddy Rockin Strong: A Tribute to Nolan Strong & The Diablos (The Wind / Norton Records, 2010); track: "I Wanna Know"
- Uma Estrela Misteriosa Revelará o Segredo (Relicário, 2024)
- Live at the BBC 10" Vinyl (2026, IN.2 Records/Cadiz Music)
- Goin' Local (2026)
- Lenny Kaye & Friends - Riot on Oxford Street CD/LP (2026, IN.2 Records/Cadiz Music)
