= The Miller's Tale: A Tom Verlaine Anthology =

Compilation album by Tom Verlaine
- Released: 1996
- Venue: The Venue, London
- Genre: Rock
- Label: Virgin

Tom Verlaine chronology
| Warm and Cool (1992) | The Miller's Tale: A Tom Verlaine Anthology (1996) | Songs and Other Things (2006) |

Professional ratings
Review scores
| Source | Rating |
|---|---|
| AllMusic | 3/5 stars |

The Miller's Tale: A Tom Verlaine Anthology is a 1996 double-CD compilation album compiled by rock historian Clinton Heylin. It chronicles Verlaine's solo career and his career with Television on one CD (including several obscurities) and an edited live performance from London in 1982 on the other CD. The title refers to Verlaine's birth surname.

== Track overview ==
The first CD is an edited release of a 1982 concert in London featuring Jimmy Ripp on guitar, Jay Dee Daugherty on drums, Fred Smith on bass, and Tom Verlaine on vocals and guitar. Lene Lovich, who sang backup vocals, was mixed out of the recording due to rights issues. The performance is notable for an extended jam in "Always" that differs considerably from the recorded version.

The second CD covers the period of the three Television albums and Verlaine's solo work, and also contains a selection of previously unreleased songs that were allegedly shelved after being submitted for release in 1986. These tracks were recorded in London, and include "Anna," "Sixteen Tulips," and "Call Me The". Additionally, it contains "Lindi-Lu," which only appeared on the US edition of Cover in 1984, and "Your Finest Hour," a b-side from the same album sessions. It also includes "The Revolution", an outtake from Television which had previously only appeared on a rare French promotional CD EP.

== Track listing ==
CD1 live at The Venue, Victoria, London, June 3, 1982

1. "Kingdom Come" (3:51)
2. "Souvenir from a Dream" (4:30)
3. "Clear It Away" (4:51)
4. "Always" (9:05)
5. "Postcard from Waterloo" (3:20)
6. "Penetration" (5:09)
7. "Breakin' in my Heart" (8:14)
8. "Marquee Moon" (13:31)
9. "Days on the Mountain" (10:30)
10. "Prove It" (5:53)

CD2 Compilation of Television and Verlaine solo tracks

1. "Venus" (3:49)
2. "Glory" (3:08)
3. "The Grip of Love" (3:55)
4. "Without a Word" (3:16)
5. "Words from the Front" (6:40)
6. "Let Go The Mansion" (3:10)
7. "Lindi-Lu" (3:43)
8. "O Foolish Heart" (4:28)
9. "Five Miles of You" (5:36)
10. "Your Finest Hour" (2:27)
11. "Anna" (5:07)
12. "Sixteen Tulips" (4:55)
13. "Call Me The" (3:35)
14. "At 4 a.m." (3:29)
15. "Stalingrad" (3:32)
16. "Call Mr. Lee" (4:14)
17. "No Glamour For Willi" (4:56)
18. "The Revolution" (3:09)
