= Tom Verlaine (album) =

Studio album by Tom Verlaine
- Released: 1979
- Studios: Blue Rock (New York, New York)
- Genre: New wave
- Length: 36:45
- Label: Elektra
- Producer: Tom Verlaine

Tom Verlaine chronology
Tom Verlaine (1979)	Dreamtime (1981)

Tom Verlaine is the solo debut studio album by American musician and Television guitarist/vocalist Tom Verlaine. It was released in 1979 through Elektra Records.

== Production ==
Several tracks, including "The Grip of Love", "Breakin' in My Heart", "Last Night", and "Red Leaves" trace their roots to unreleased Television songs. In the case of "Red Leaves", the verses are drawn from "Adventure", the unfinished title track of Television's 1978 album Adventure. Fred Smith, bassist for Television, also performs on the record. Ricky Wilson, at the time guitarist of the B-52's, plays guitar on "Breakin' in My Heart"; it is the only song Wilson recorded that did not involve other B-52's members.

David Bowie covered "Kingdom Come" the following year on Scary Monsters (And Super Creeps). Tom Verlaine was originally set to play lead guitar on this version; however, Bowie was unhappy with his part and instead used King Crimson guitarist Robert Fripp.

== Mix variations ==
The album was originally mixed by Verlaine, but this mix was rejected by Elektra Records. Bob Clearmountain subsequently remixed the album, and it was this version that was released by Elektra in 1979. In 2002, a CD reissue by Collectors' Choice Music inadvertently used the earlier, rejected mix for initial pressings fulfilled by mail order; this was subsequently replaced with the approved Clearmountain mix by the time the CD was made available through traditional retail channels.

== Reception ==
Professional ratings
Review scores
Source	Rating
AllMusic	4.5/5 stars
The Encyclopedia of Popular Music	4/5 stars
The Great Rock Discography	7/10
MusicHound Rock: The Essential Album Guide	3.5/5 stars
Music Week	3/4 stars
OndaRock	7/10
Record Mirror	3/5 stars
The Rolling Stone Album Guide	4/5 stars
Spin Alternative Record Guide	7/10
The Village Voice	A−

Tom Verlaine was ranked at number 15 among the top "Albums of the Year" for 1979 by NME. The Washington Post said that the album "illustrate how new wave can serve as musical discourse for challenging ideas."

== Track listing ==
All songs written by Tom Verlaine.

Side one

1. "The Grip of Love" – 3:58
2. "Souvenir from a Dream" – 3:47
3. "Kingdom Come" – 3:42
4. "Mr. Bingo" – 3:57
5. "Yonki Time" – 3:54

Side two

1. "Flash Lightning" – 3:52
2. "Red Leaves" – 2:49
3. "Last Night" – 4:37
4. "Breakin' in My Heart" – 6:06

== Personnel ==
- Tom Verlaine – guitar, vocals; organ on "Kingdom Come"
- Fred Smith – bass, guitar, percussion, vocals
- Jay Dee Daugherty – drums, percussion, vocals
- Allan Schwartzberg – drums, percussion on "Kingdom Come"
- Tom Thompson – drums on "Last Night"
- Deerfrance – vocals on "Red Leaves"
- Mark Abel – 12-string guitar on "Last Night"
- Bruce Brody – piano on "Last Night"
- Ricky Wilson – guitar on "Breakin' in My Heart"

Technical

- Michael Ewasko – engineer
- John Jansen – additional engineering on "Last Night"
- Johnny Lee – art direction, design
- Joel Brodsky – front cover photograph
