= Dreamtime (Tom Verlaine album) =

Studio album by Tom Verlaine
- Released: July 1981
- Recorded: 1981
- Studios: A&R, RPM and Penny Lane Studios, New York
- Genre: New wave
- Length: 38:21
- Label: Warner Bros.
- Producer: Tom Verlaine

Tom Verlaine chronology
Tom Verlaine (1979)	Dreamtime (1981)	Words from the Front (1982)

Alternative cover
- 1994 Infinite Zero reissue

Professional ratings
Review scores
Source	Rating
AllMusic	4.5/5 stars
Christgau's Record Guide	A−
The Encyclopedia of Popular Music	3/5 stars
The Great Rock Discography	6/10
MusicHound Rock: The Essential Album Guide	3/5 stars
Record Collector	4/5 stars
Record Mirror	4/5 stars
Rolling Stone	4/5 stars
The Rolling Stone Album Guide	3/5 stars
Spin Alternative Record Guide	8/10

Dreamtime is the second solo studio album by American musician Tom Verlaine, released in 1981. "Without a Word" is a rewrite of "Hard On Love," an unreleased Television song performed live in 1974 and 1975.

The album was reissued in 1994 by Infinite Zero Archive/American Recordings label, with two bonus tracks drawn from the 1981 "Always" 7" & 12" single. It was reissued in 2008 by Collectors' Choice Music with no bonus tracks.

== Music ==
The music of Dreamtime has been described as a blend of power-pop and punk. In their Audio review, Jon and Sally Tiven said that Verlaine is a "purveyor of progressive New Wave music" and said that the album is "more interesting than your average current rock LP". They also noted that "Verlaine's proficiency at making imaginative noises on guitar and a dramatic delivery of poetic lyrics bring his tunes far closer to pure art than his so-called peers get" and drew attention to the presence of pop melodies and classic rock sounds on the record.

== Track listing ==
All songs written by Tom Verlaine.

Side one

1. "There's a Reason" – 3:39
2. "Penetration" – 4:01
3. "Always" – 3:58
4. "The Blue Robe" – 3:54
5. "Without a Word" – 3:17

Side two

1. "Mr Blur" – 3:24
2. "Fragile" – 3:27
3. "A Future in Noise" – 4:13
4. "Down on the Farm" – 4:49
5. "Mary Marie" – 3:25

Bonus tracks (1994 CD reissue)

1. "The Blue Robe" (alternate version) – 4:17
2. "Always" (alternate version) – 4:09

== Personnel ==
- Tom Verlaine – guitars, solos, vocals on all tracks; bass on "Penetration"
- Ritchie Fliegler – guitars on all tracks, except "Penetration"
- Fred Smith – bass on "Mr. Blur", "Down on the Farm", "There's a Reason" and "Without a Word"
- Donnie Nossov – bass on "Always", "Mary Marie", "Fragile", "The Blue Robe", "A Future in Noise" and bonus tracks
- Jay Dee Daugherty – drums on "Mr. Blur", "Down on the Farm", "There's a Reason", "Without a Word" and "Penetration"
- Rich Teeter – drums on "Always", "Mary Marie", "Fragile", "The Blue Robe", "A Future in Noise" and bonus tracks
- Bruce Brody – keyboards on "Always", "Mary Marie", end of "Penetration" and "Always" (alternate version)

Technical

- Robert Clifford – engineer
- David Chenkin, John Terelle, Steve Ett – assistant engineers
- George Delmerico – design
- James Hamilton – photography

== Charts ==
Album

Year	Chart	Peak Position
1981	Billboard Pop Albums	177
