= The Blow-Up =

Live album by Television
- Released: 1982
- Recorded: 1978
- Genre: Punk rock
- Length: 1:24:54
- Label: ROIR

Television chronology
Adventure (1978)	The Blow-Up (1982)	Television (1992)

The Blow-Up is a live album by the American band Television, released as The Blow Up on cassette in 1982. It was reissued in 1990 and again in 1999. The songs first appeared on a bootleg titled Arrow.

== Production ==
Recorded at CBGB or My Father's Place in 1978, the album was released four years after the band broke up. It contains covers of "Knockin' on Heaven's Door" and "Satisfaction". ROIR allegedly acquired the recording from the fan who had bootlegged the band's shows; The Blow-Up's sound quality is typical of a bootlegged recording. "Little Johnny Jewel" had previously only been issued as a single.

== Critical reception ==
Professional ratings
Review scores
Source	Rating
AllMusic	4/5 stars
Robert Christgau	B+
The Encyclopedia of Popular Music	2/5 stars
MusicHound Rock: The Essential Album Guide	2.5/5 stars
The Rolling Stone Album Guide	3/5 stars
St. Petersburg Times	B
Spin Alternative Record Guide	9/10

Robert Christgau, who cowrote the liner notes, stated that, "as with so many ROIR cassettes (and commercial tapes in general), audio makes the difference between a laudable document and living history," and called the version of "Little Johnny Jewel" "definitive." The New York Times praised the "lyrical, incendiary" renditions.

AllMusic wrote that the album "comes awfully close to being an essential document, simply because the band's studio albums didn't always capture the rawness and spontaneity that fueled their on-stage improvisations." In 1990, The Philadelphia Inquirer determined that The Blow-Up "captures the heady intensity of the best guitar band to come out of New York's late-'70s punk/new-wave scene." The Vancouver Sun admired the "breathtaking dual guitar interplay." Spin listed the 1999 reissue as one of the five best of the year, deeming "Little Johnny Jewel" "the height of love between man and E-string."

== Track listing ==
All tracks are written by Tom Verlaine, except where noted.

No.	Title	Writer(s)	Length
1.	"The Blow-Up"		4:00
2.	"See No Evil"		3:22
3.	"Prove It"		5:00
4.	"Elevation"		4:50
5.	"I Don't Care"		3:04
6.	"Venus de Milo"		3:31
7.	"Foxhole"		5:04
8.	"Ain't That Nothin'"		6:13
9.	"Knockin' on Heaven's Door"	Bob Dylan	7:50
10.	"Little Johnny Jewel"		14:56
11.	"Friction"		5:01
12.	"Marquee Moon"		14:45
13.	"Satisfaction"	Jagger–Richards	7:18

== Personnel ==
Personnel taken from The Blow-Up liner notes.

- Tom Verlaine – guitar, lead vocals
- Richard Lloyd – guitar, backing vocals
- Billy Ficca – drums
- Fred Smith – bass, backing vocals
