= Songs and Other Things =

Studio album by Tom Verlaine
- Released: 2006
- Genre: Post-punk
- Label: Thrill Jockey

Tom Verlaine chronology
The Miller's Tale: A Tom Verlaine Anthology (1996)	Songs and Other Things (2006)	Around (2006)

Professional ratings
Review scores
Source	Rating
AllMusic	4/5 stars
The Guardian	3/5 stars
Pitchfork	6.6/10

Songs and Other Things is an album by Tom Verlaine. It was engineered in and around New York City by Patrick A. Derivaz, Wayne Dorell, Fred Smith, Mario Salvati, and Larry 7.

== Track listing ==
All songs written by Tom Verlaine.

1. "A Parade in Littleton"
2. "Heavenly Charm"
3. "Orbit"
4. "Blue Light"
5. "From Her Fingers"
6. "Nice Actress"
7. "A Stroll"
8. "The Earth is in the Sky"
9. "Lovebird Asylum Seeker"
10. "Documentary"
11. "Shingaling"
12. "All Weirded Out"
13. "The Day on You"
14. "Peace Piece"

== Personnel ==
- Tom Verlaine - guitars, vocals
- Patrick A. Derivaz - bass tracks 2–5, 7–9
- Fred Smith - bass track 1
- Tony Shanahan - bass track 12
- Louie Appel - drums tracks 2–9
- Graham Hawthorne - drums tracks 10, 11, 13
- Jay Dee Daugherty - drums tracks 1, 12
- Jimmy Rip - rhythm guitar track 12
