= Live at the Old Waldorf =

Live album by Television
- Released: 2003
- Recorded: 29 June 1978
- Studio: Live broadcast recorded by and aired on KSAN
- Label: Rhino Handmade
- Producer: Andy Zax, Patrick Milligan

Television chronology
Television (1992)	Live at the Old Waldorf (2003)

Professional ratings
Review scores
Source	Rating
AllMusic	4/5 stars
The Austin Chronicle	4/5 stars
Blender	5/5 stars
The Village Voice	A−

Live at the Old Waldorf is a live album by Television that was recorded on 29 June 1978 at the Old Waldorf, San Francisco, on their last American tour until their 1992 reunion. The show was from a radio show broadcast that was a popular bootleg until its official release by Rhino Handmade in 2003.

== Track listing ==
All tracks composed by Tom Verlaine except where indicated.

2003 Rhino Handmade Limited Edition CD Release (5000 copies)

1. "The Dream's Dream"
2. "Venus"
3. "Foxhole"
4. "Careful"
5. "Ain't that Nothin'"
6. "Little Johnny Jewel"
7. "Friction"
8. "Marquee Moon"
9. "(I Can't Get No) Satisfaction" (Mick Jagger, Keith Richards)

2011 Rhino Vinyl Limited Edition 2 LP White Vinyl Release (3000 copies)

Side one

1. "The Dream's Dream"
2. "Venus"
3. "Foxhole"
4. "Careful"

Side two

1. "Ain't that Nothin'"
2. "Little Johnny Jewel"

Side three

1. "Friction"
2. "Marquee Moon"

Side four

1. "(I Can't Get No) Satisfaction" (Mick Jagger, Keith Richards)

== Personnel ==
Television

- Tom Verlaine - vocals, guitar
- Richard Lloyd - guitar, vocals
- Fred Smith - bass, vocals
- Billy Ficca - drums
