= The Wonder (album) =

Studio album by Tom Verlaine
- Released: 1990
- Genre: Post-punk
- Label: Fontana (UK)
- Producer: Tom Verlaine, Fred Smith, John Jansen on "August" and "Shimmer"

Tom Verlaine chronology
Flash Light (1987)	The Wonder (1990)	Warm and Cool (1992)

Professional ratings
Review scores
Source	Rating
Allmusic	1.5/5 stars

The Wonder is the sixth studio album by rock artist Tom Verlaine. It was released in 1990 on Fontana Records. The album was engineered by Mario Salvati and mixed by Tom Verlaine and Fred Smith except side 1 tracks 1, 2, 4, 5 and side 2 track 1 mixed by Julian Mendelsohn.

== Recording ==
Recorded after a three-year break, The Wonder featured Verlaine using a more affected singing style, described by Allmusic's David Cleary as "an oily manner ... suggesting a smarmy Bryan Ferry" (the lead singer of Roxy Music). Verlaine also used the guitarist of the Church Marty Willson-Piper, uncredited, to fill out the guitar sound on the album. Willson-Piper recalled playing on "Stalingrad" with Jay Dee Daugherty, who also wasn't credited. Additionally, Deerfrance provided backing vocals on "Prayer."

== Track listing ==
All songs written by Tom Verlaine

=== Side one ===
1. "Kaleidescopin'" – 3:27
2. "August" – 5:22
3. "Ancient Egypt" – 4:32
4. "Shimmer" – 3:36
5. "Stalingrad" – 3:25

=== Side two ===
1. "Pillow" – 4:27
2. "Storm" – 2:37
3. "5 Hours from Calais" – 4:35
4. "Cooleridge" – 4:17
5. "Prayer" – 3:55

== Personnel ==
- Tom Verlaine – guitars, solos and vocals
- Jimmy Ripp – guitars
- Marty Willson-Piper - guitar (ref: https://www.facebook.com/share/p/187yC6xk16/)
- Fred Smith – bass
- Andy Newmark – drums
- Jay Dee Daugherty - drums
- Bruce Brody – keyboards

Technical

- Mario Salvati – engineer
