= Words from the Front =

Studio album by Tom Verlaine
- Released: June 1982
- Recorded: 1982
- Studios: Blue Rock, New York City
- Genre: Post-punk
- Length: 36:42
- Label: Virgin
- Producer: Tom Verlaine

Tom Verlaine chronology
Dreamtime (1981)	Words from the Front (1982)	Cover (1984)

Words from the Front is Tom Verlaine's third solo album, released in 1982. It was issued on compact disc in 2008 by Collectors' Choice Music. Music videos were made for "Words from the Front" and "Clear It Away", directed by Ed Steinberg.

== Critical reception ==
Professional ratings
Review scores
Source	Rating
AllMusic	3/5 stars
American Songwriter	4/5 stars
The Austin Chronicle	2.5/5 stars
Christgau's Record Guide	B+
The Encyclopedia of Popular Music	3/5 stars
OndaRock	6/10
Popmatters	7/10 stars
Rolling Stone	4/5 stars
(The New) Rolling Stone Album Guide	2/5 stars
Spin Alternative Record Guide	5/10

The Globe and Mail wrote that Verlaine's "shadowy, intense vignettes do cast a kind of spell, but there are few new developments here in the territory he has already mastered." The Boston Phoenix said that Words from the Front "is probably Verlaine’s weakest album, but it holds up."

Words from the Front was ranked among the top fifty "Albums of the Year" for 1982 by NME.

== Track listing ==
All songs written by Tom Verlaine

Side one

1. "Present Arrived" – 5:17
2. "Postcard from Waterloo" – 3:32
3. "True Story" – 5:25
4. "Clear It Away" – 4:11

Side two

1. "Words from the Front" – 6:42
2. "Coming Apart" – 2:59
3. "Days on the Mountain" – 8:55

== Personnel ==
- Tom Verlaine – guitars, vocals
- Thommy Price – drums
- Jimmy Ripp – guitars
- Joe Vasta – bass

Additional personnel

- Fred Smith – bass on "Clear It Away"
- Jay Dee Daugherty – drums on "Clear It Away"
- Allan Schwartzberg – drums on "Days on the Mountain"
- Lene Lovich – saxophone on "Days on the Mountain", vocals on "Postcard from Waterloo"

Technical

- Dave Jerden – mixing
- Michael Ewasko – engineer
- Rich Mahon – illustration
- Howard Rosenberg – photography
