= Lolita Pop =

Swedish rock band

- Origin: Örebro, Sweden
- Genres: Pop rock
- Years active: 1979–1992 • 2019–present
- Members: Karin Wistrand; Sten Booberg; Benkt Söderberg; Rickard Donatello; Bobo Ölander
- Past members: Per Stahlberg; Thomas Johansson; Peter Olsen; Ulf Lernhammar; Matts Alsberg; Henrik Melin; Fredrik Blank; Christer Björklund; Magnus Eriksson

Lolita Pop is a Swedish rock band from Örebro that was mainly active from 1979 to 1992. They scored successes on the Swedish album chart during the 1980s and early 1990s. The band reunited in 2019 for their 40th anniversary and continues to tour today.

The band's core consisted of singer Karin Wistrand and guitarists Sten Booberg and Benkt Svensson (later Benkt Söderberg). Together, they wrote most of the music. Percussionist and saxophonist Per Eriksson is among the longest-serving members. Lolita Pop scored eight studio albums and about 800 performances in Sweden, Europe and the United States. Some of their popular songs were Tarzan on a Big Red Scooter, Hey Winner, Mind Your Eye, and Bang Your Head.

== Career ==
=== Early years ===
Lolita Pop formed at the premiere of Rockmagasinet, a club, in Örebro, Sweden on 26 May 1979. The name of the band was inspired by the appearance of “Miss Lolita” at a local porn club.

The repertoire consisted mostly of cover songs including Iggy Pop, Lou Reed, Roxy Music and Television. These songs were performed in Swedish in humorous translations, such as Iggy Pop's "I'm bored, I'm the chairman of the bored" became "I am weary, I stand at the end of every level" and Television's "Elevation, do not go to my head, Stop the elevator and my skull is flat." Per Eriksson designed stickers with the band's name and distributed them to friends who were on a trip. The result was that Lolita Pop's name could be seen in Stockholm, Hamburg, Paris, New York, New Delhi and Beijing long before the band played outside their club. Per Eriksson also designed most of the band's album covers.

Lolita Pop's first album was Rogue Pictures and was published by Pipaluckbolaget in 1982. The legacy of the New York band Television was heard clearly in Benkt Svensson's guitar solo in “Black and Dirty”. Punky “Gold Here?” eventually became the music in the computer game Invasion Gotland, a Swedish version of Battlefield Vietnam.

=== Mid-career ===
In 1983 the band changed record labels to Mistlur and released two albums. Before the filming of “Five Seeking a Taxi”, the drummer at that time, Peter Olsen, was replaced by the band's saxophonist Per Eriksson. Bassist Thomas Johansson dropped out prior to recording “Wanderings”. He continued to write lyrics throughout Lolita Pop's career.

In 1983 and 1984, the band toured Sweden and visited many places all over the country. On several occasions, they had local bands opening for them as for instance in Björklinge, where Fire was the opening act.

Lolita Pop then began directing its focus overseas in 1984. The band released the album Lolita Pop, with English-language versions of previously released songs, and did a few European tours.

Ulf Lernhammar skipped 1985 for the filming of Lolita Pop's last Swedish-language album “Have Pleasure”. Benkt Svensson took over the bass. After performing in the United States, a recording contract was made with Virgin Records U.S.. The band's friendship with Television guitarist Richard Lloyd led to Eriksson, Olsen and Johansson appearing on his album “Fields of Fire”. In 1986, Matts Alsberg from the Stockholm band Rust became bassist and Benkt Svensson returned to the guitar.

=== Later years ===
In 1987, Virgin Records supplemented an English version of “Have Pleasure” with the newly written songs Bang Your Head and Mind Your Eye. Bang Your Head appeared on the soundtrack of the American film “Hiding Out”. "Mind Your Eye" was used in Colin Nutley movie “The Ninth Company” and the Maria Gripe film “Agnes Cecilia”. In Sweden, “Have Pleasure” was nominated for a Grammy Award.

In 1988, Karin Wistrand sang the duet “Stay with You” with Orup. The song was on the track list for six weeks. Matts Alsberg left Lolita Pop and was replaced by Henrik Melin from the Örebro band “Mr. Krystal Party”. Lolita Pop released “Love Poison” in 1989, the band's first album that was written directly in English. “Hey Winner” and “Tarzan on a Big Red Scooter” appeared up on the Swedish charts – "Tarzan..." was on the Sommartoppen list all summer and reached number one in August 1989. "Hey Winner" became the soundtrack to Colin Nutley's “Heartbreak Hotel” and the TV series “Tusenbröder”. “Hey Winner” was also nominated for a Grammy award. The band launched its career overseas when Benkt Svensson and Per Eriksson left the band after ten years.

Lolita Pop released their last album in 1990, which was “Blumenkraft”, with Fredrik Blank as new guitarist and Chris (Muttis) Björklund on drums. This too was nominated for a Grammis award. The band continued to tour until 1991. After that, Karin Wistrand and Fredrik Blank worked with Karin's solo album "The Sun", which was released in 1993. Sten Booberg freelanced as a guitarist throughout the 1990s and played with, among others, the Muppets, Olle Ljungström, Marty Robbins, Orup and Idde Schultz. Fredrik Blank played with Staffan Hellstrand, Idde Schultz and other famous musicians.

Since the original disbandment, Lolita Pop has been frugal with reunions. The original group of 1987 reunited three times to audiences in the 1990s, including the Castle Festival in Örebro in July 1997 for about 10,000 people.

In 2019, the group reunited for their 40th anniversary and began touring again.

=== The next generation ===
Benkt Söderberg's daughters Klara and Johanna Söderberg are touring extensively across the world under the name First Aid Kit. Sten Booberg's son Rasmus Booberg is the lead singer, guitarist and songwriter in the band New Keepers of the Water Towers. Their second album was released in 2010 under the U.S. label MeteorCity. Rasmus is also the drummer in the rock band “Grass Eating Man”.

== Band members ==
=== Current lineup ===
- Karin Wistrand, vocals, guitar (1979–92, 2019–present)
- Sten Booberg, guitar (1979–92, 2019–present)
- Benkt Svensson (now Benkt Söderberg), guitar, bass (1979–89, 2019–present)
- Rickard Donatello, bass (2019–present)
- Bobo Ölander, drums (2019–present)

=== Past members ===
- Per Eriksson (now Per Stahlberg), drums, saxophone (1979–89)
- Thomas Johansson, bass (1979–83)
- Peter Olsen, drums (1980–83)
- Ulf Lernhammar, bass (1983–84)
- Matts Alsberg, bass (1986–87)
- Henrik Melin, bass (1987–92)
- Fredrik Blank, guitar (1989–92)
- Christer "Muttis" Björklund, drums (1989–90)
- Magnus "Norpan" Eriksson, drums (1990–92)

== Discography ==
- Falska Bilder LP, Pipaluckbolaget 1982 (PLP 2)
- Fem Söker En Skatt LP, Mistlur 1983 (MLR 28)
- Irrfärder LP, Mistlur 1983 (MLR 38)
- Lolita Pop LP, Mistlur 1984 (MLR 40)
- Att Ha Fritidsbåt LP, Mistlur 1985 (MLR 44)
- Lolita Pop LP, Mistlur 1987 (MLR 56) CD, Mistlur 1987 (MLRCD 56) CD, Virgin, 1987 (CDV 2472) MC, Virgin, 1987 (4-90620) MC, Virgin, 1987 (7-90620-4) LP Virgin 1987 (1-90620) CD, Virgin, 1987 (2-90620) LP Virgin 1987 (VJL-28038)
- Love Poison LP, Mistlur 1989 (MLR 66) CD, Mistlur 1989 (MLRCD 66)
- Blumenkraft LP, Mistlur 1990 (MLR 77) CD, Mistlur 1990 (MLRCD 77)
- Regn Av Dagar 1982-1990 CD, MNW 1993 (MNWCD 248)
- Lolita Pop: MNW klassiker 2CD 2008 (MNWCD 20–45)

=== Singles ===
- Kärlekens Pedaler 7", Pipaluckbolaget 1981 (PLS 3)
- Jorduppgång 7", Mistlur 1982 (MLRS-30)
- Kuggar 12", Mistlur 1985 (MLRDJ-04)
- 2000 År 7", Mistlur 1985 (MLRS-46)
- Mind Your Eye 7", Mistlur 1987 (MLRS 53)
- Bang Your Head 12", Mistlur 1987 (MLRDJ 9) 12" Virgin 1987 (PR 2077)
- Bang Your Head 7", Mistlur 1988 (MLRS 62)
- Bang Your Head 12", Virgin 1988 (VST 1024)
- Hey Winner 7", Mistlur 1989 (MLRS 67)
- Tarzan On A Big Red Scooter 7", Mistlur 1989 (MLRS 70)
- Pay The Piper 7", Mistlur 1990 (MLRS 81)
- Here She Comes 7", Mistlur 1990 (MLRS 84)
- Live Forever 7", Mistlur 1991 (MLRS 85)
