= Warm and Cool =

Studio album by Tom Verlaine
- Released: 1992, 2005
- Studios: Acoustilog, New York
- Genre: Instrumental rock
- Labels: Rykodisc (1992), Thrill Jockey (2005)
- Producer: Tom Verlaine

Tom Verlaine chronology
The Wonder (1990)	Warm and Cool (1992)	The Miller's Tale: A Tom Verlaine Anthology (1996)

Warm and Cool is a solo album by the American musician Tom Verlaine, released in 1992. It was his first entirely instrumental recording.

== Production ==
The album was produced by Verlaine. It was engineered by Mario Salvati at Acoustilog, in New York City. Patrick Derivaz and Billy Ficca played bass and drums, respectively, on the majority of the tracks. It was recorded over two nights, primarily because Verlaine wanted to play with Ficca. "Harley Quinn" was recorded with Fred Smith and Jay Dee Daugherty.

== Critical reception ==
Professional ratings
Review scores
Source	Rating
AllMusic	3/5 stars
Calgary Herald	A
Robert Christgau	(neither)
Vancouver Sun	3/5 stars

Stereo Review wrote that the album "finds Verlaine exploring new avenues of expression on the guitar, applying a thinking postmodern rocker's minimalism, a jazzman's improvisational skill, and a vintage Fifties guitarist's predilection for reverb and twang." The Vancouver Sun opined that it "never really takes off; there are a couple of nice moody bits."

The Washington Post considered "much of it [to be] cool, spare neo-rockabilly with a Henry Mancini twist." The Calgary Herald noted that the guitar can sound "like Ry Cooder meets Angelo Badalamenti in a garage just off New York`s Central Park." The Houston Chronicle called Warm and Cool "maybe the first urban New Age album."

== Track listing ==
All songs written by Tom Verlaine.

Rykodisc issue 1992

1. "Those Harbor Lights"
2. "Sleepwalkin'"
3. "The Deep Dark Clouds"
4. "Space Crash"
5. "Depot (1951)"
6. "Boulevard"
7. "Harley Quinn"
8. "Sor Juanna"
9. "Depot (1957)"
10. "Spiritual"
11. "Little Dance"
12. "Ore"
13. "Depot (1958)"
14. "Lore"

Thrill Jockey issue 2005

1. "Those Harbor Lights"
2. "Sleepwalkin'"
3. "The Deep Dark Clouds"
4. "Saucer Crash"
5. "Depot (1951)"
6. "Boulevard"
7. "Harley Quinn"
8. "Sor Juanna"
9. "Depot (1957)"
10. "Spiritual"
11. "Little Dance"
12. "Ore"
13. "Depot (1958)"
14. "Lore"
15. "Old Car"
16. "Ancient"
17. "Asmileyfallsapart"
18. "Avanti"
19. "Early Waltz"
20. "Please Keep Going"
21. "Tontootempo"
22. "A Film of Flowers"

== Personnel ==
- Tom Verlaine – guitars
- Patrick A. Derivaz – bass
- Billy Ficca – drums
- Fred Smith – bass only on "Harley Quinn"
- Jay Dee Daugherty – drums only on "Harley Quinn"

Technical

- Mario Salvati – engineer
- Jutta Koether – photography
