= Keith Patchel =

American musician (1955–2021)

Keith Patchel (July 23, 1955 – August 7, 2021) was an American musician and composer.

Patchel studied at the Juilliard School in New York City with among other teachers Samuel Adler.

His Pluto Symphony created for the Hayden Planetarium was an official selection for nomination for the 2015 Pulitzer Prize in Music.

Patchel composed the opera Plain of Jars about the U.S. bombings of Laos which premiered at the Medicine Show Theater in New York City on December 10, 2016. He was the recipient of the 2017 Acker award for music.

Patchel played guitar and sang backing vocals on the track "Losin' Anna" on Richard Lloyd formerly of Television's 1987 album Field of Fire. Patchel created the original music for the 2008 film Shoot First and Pray You Live starring Jim Gaffigan.

Patchel wrote and performed the accompanying music for Anthony Haden-Guest's 2017 spoken word album, The Further Chronicles of Now.
