= Cover (Tom Verlaine album) =

Studio album by Tom Verlaine
- Released: September 1984
- Recorded: 1984
- Studio: Blue Rock, New York City; Eldorado, Los Angeles; Sorcerer Sound, New York City; Bearsville, Woodstock; Townhouse, London; Roundhouse, London
- Genre: Post punk
- Length: 32:39
- Label: Virgin
- Producer: Tom Verlaine

Tom Verlaine chronology
Words from the Front (1982)	Cover (1984)	Flash Light (1987)

Cover is the fourth solo album by Tom Verlaine. It was released in 1984.

== Critical reception ==
Professional ratings
Review scores
Source	Rating
AllMusic	4.5/5 stars
The Encyclopedia of Popular Music	4/5 stars
The New York Times	Favourable
Record Mirror	5/5 stars
(The New) Rolling Stone Album Guide	3.5/5 stars

NME ranked the album number 18 among the "Albums of the Year" for 1984.

== Track listing ==
All songs written and composed by Tom Verlaine, except "Five Miles of You", composed with Jimmy Ripp

1. "Five Miles of You" (4:20)
2. "Travelling" (5:00)
3. "O Foolish Heart" (4:28)
4. "Lindi-Lu" (3:40)
5. "Let Go the Mansion" (3:08)
6. "Dissolve/Reveal" (4:41)
7. "Miss Emily" (4:41)
8. "Rotation" (4:11)
9. "Swim" (4:31)

== Personnel ==
- Tom Verlaine - guitars, solos, vocals, synthesizer; drum machine on "O Foolish Heart", "Let Go the Mansion", "Dissolve/Reveal" and "Swim"
- Jimmy Ripp - guitars, bass on "Swim"
- Fred Smith - bass
- Bill Laswell - bass on "Miss Emily"
- Jay Dee Daugherty - drums on "Five Miles of You" and "Travelling"
- Allan Schwartzberg - drums on "Lindi-Lu", "Miss Emily" and "Rotation"

Technical

- Ray Niznik, Michael Ewasko, Dave Jerden, Mario Salvati, Howard Gray, Steve Brown - engineers
- Jill Furmanovsky - photography

== Charts ==
Chart	Year	Peak position
Swedish Albums Chart	1984	35
