= Alchemy (Richard Lloyd album) =

Studio album by Richard Lloyd
- Released: 1979
- Recorded: Summer 1979
- Studio: Bearsville Studios, Bearsville, New York
- Genre: Rock
- Length: 35:44
- Label: Elektra
- Producer: Michael Young

Richard Lloyd chronology
Alchemy (1979)	Field of Fire (1986)

Professional ratings
Review scores
Source	Rating
AllMusic	3.5/5 stars
The Village Voice	B+

Alchemy is the debut solo album of Television guitarist Richard Lloyd. It was released in 1979, one year after the breakup of Television and the release of their second album, Adventure. Trouser Press called it "a gem of a solo album." Its title track was a minor New York FM radio hit.

Lloyd's backing band on the album featured a number of notable New York musicians, including guitarist James Mastro (later of the Bongos), Television bassist Fred Smith and drummer Vinny DeNunzio, formerly of the Feelies. Producer Michael Young later added guitar and synthesizer overdubs to some tracks, which Lloyd stated that he strenuously opposed at the time.

== LP track listing ==
All songs written by Richard Lloyd except where noted

=== Side one ===
1. "Misty Eyes" – 3:51
2. "In the Night" – 3:43
3. "Alchemy" – 3:50
4. "Woman's Ways" – 3:14
5. "Number Nine" – 2:51

=== Side two ===
1. "Should Have Known Better" (Vinny DeNunzio, Lloyd) – 2:52
2. "Blue and Grey" – 3:35
3. "Summer Rain" – 3:17
4. "Pretend" (DeNunzio, Lloyd, James Mastro, Fred Smith) – 4:11
5. "Dying Words" – 4:20

== Personnel ==
- Richard Lloyd – guitar, vocals, piano, harmonica
- Jim Mastro – guitar
- Matthew McKenzie – guitar, backing vocals, piano
- Fred Smith – bass, backing vocals
- Vinny DeNunzio – drums, backing vocals
- Michael Young – guitar, synthesizer, arrangements

Technical

- George Cornell, Tom Edmunds - assistant engineer
- Dan Asher - front cover photography
