= Television (Television album) =

Studio album by Television
- Released: September 28, 1992
- Genre: Art-punk
- Length: 42:40
- Label: Capitol
- Producer: Television

Television chronology
The Blow-Up (1982)	Television (1992)	Live at the Old Waldorf (2003)

Singles from Television
- 1. "Call Mr. Lee" Released: 1992

Television is the third and final studio album by the American rock band Television.

It was released on September 28, 1992, about a year after the band’s reunion and 14 years after the band's second studio album and subsequent breakup in 1978. A video for "Call Mr. Lee" was filmed and briefly aired on MTV.

Critical reviews were largely positive.

== Reception ==
Professional ratings
Review scores
Source	Rating
AllMusic	3.5/5 stars
Robert Christgau	B+
The Encyclopedia of Popular Music	2/5 stars
Entertainment Weekly	A
Rolling Stone	4/5 stars

Television has been generally well received by critics. Rock critic Robert Christgau wrote, "I prefer the more rocking, songful old Television, but it's a tribute to Tom Verlaine's conceptual restlessness and force of personality that in a world where alternative guitar means making noise or mixing and matching from the used bins, these four veterans have regrouped with a distinct new sonic identity. Droll, warm-hearted, sophisticated, cryptic, jazzy yet unjazzlike, they sound like nothing else—except, just a little, old Television". David Fricke of Rolling Stone said, "It was worth waiting fifteen years." Per Milo Miles of The New York Times, "Trying to adjust after a long layoff, these musicians have assembled a scaled-down Television, though one with exquisite design details." Ira Robbins of Entertainment Weekly hailed it as "a shadowy album no less edgy or atmospheric than their first two. The band's filigree of interwoven guitar patterns has gained in maturity and refinement, but songwriter-singer Verlaine’s unique vision still comes through loud and clear."

== Track listing ==
All tracks are written by Tom Verlaine.

No.	Title	Length
1.	"1880 or So"	3:41
2.	"Shane, She Wrote This"	4:21
3.	"In World"	4:12
4.	"Call Mr. Lee"	4:16
5.	"Rhyme"	4:47
6.	"No Glamour for Willi"	5:00
7.	"Beauty Trip"	4:22
8.	"The Rocket"	3:21
9.	"This Tune"	3:42
10.	"Mars"	4:56

== Personnel ==
Television

- Billy Ficca – drums, production
- Richard Lloyd – guitar (solos: "1880 or so", chorus of "Call Mr. Lee", "Rhyme"), slide guitar on "Beauty Trip", production
- Fred Smith – bass, vocals, guitar, executive production, mixing
- Tom Verlaine – vocals, guitar (all solos except where noted), executive production, mixing

Technical

- Vera Beren – production assistance
- Joe Brescio – mastering
- Patrick A. Derivaz – engineering assistance
- Mario Salvati – engineering, mixing
