= Flash Light (album) =

Studio album by Tom Verlaine
- Released: 1987
- Studio: Sorcerer 2, New York City
- Genre: Post-punk
- Label: Fontana (UK), IRS (US)
- Producer: Fred Smith, Tom Verlaine; David Bascombe (only "The Scientist Writes a Letter")

Tom Verlaine chronology
Cover (1984)	Flash Light (1987)	The Wonder (1990)

Professional ratings
Review scores
Source	Rating
AllMusic	4/5 stars
Blender	4/5 stars
Robert Christgau	A−
Record Mirror	4.5/5 stars
The Rolling Stone Album Guide	3.5/5 stars

Flash Light is Tom Verlaine's fifth solo album. After a three-year hiatus, during which Verlaine lived in both New York and Europe, he released the album with a large amount of promotion and touring in the UK.

It was recorded by Mario Salvati at Sorcerer 2, New York City except "The Scientist Writes a Letter", engineered by Mark Wallis. Mixed by Paul O'Duffy at Sarm West, London.

The cover artwork was by Susan Hiller, who also created the cover artwork for the accompanying 7-inch singles, 'Cry Mercy Judge' and 'A Town Called Walker'. Layout by John Rimmer at Pointblanc.

== Track listing ==
All songs written by Tom Verlaine

=== Side one ===
1. "Cry Mercy Judge"
2. "Say a Prayer"
3. "A Town Called Walker"
4. "Song"
5. "The Scientist Writes a Letter"

=== Side two ===
1. "Bomb"
2. "4 A.M."
3. "The Funniest Thing"
4. "Annie's Telling Me"
5. "One Time at Sundown"

== Personnel ==
- Tom Verlaine - guitar, vocals
- Jimmy Ripp - guitar
- Fred Smith - bass
- Allan Schwartzberg - drums
- Andy Newmark - drums on "The Scientist Writes a Letter"

Technical

- Mark Wallis - engineer on "The Scientist Writes a Letter"
- Paul O'Duffy - mixing
- Mario Salvati - recording
- Susan Hiller - cover artwork
- John Rimmer - cover layout

== Charts ==
Album

Year	Country	Chart	Peak position	Citation
1987	UK	UK Official Album Chart	99	

Singles

Year	Country	Single	Chart	Peak position	Citation
1987	UK	"Cry Mercy Judge"	UK Official Singles Chart	99	
