= Banga (album) =

Studio album by Patti Smith
- Released: June 1, 2012
- Recorded: 2011
- Studios: Electric Lady Studios, New York City; Hobo Recorders, Hoboken, New Jersey
- Genre: Rock
- Length: 58:35
- Label: Columbia
- Producers: Patti Smith, Tony Shanahan, Jay Dee Daugherty, Lenny Kaye

Patti Smith chronology
Twelve (2007)	Banga (2012)

Singles from Banga
- 1. "April Fool" Released: April 1, 2012

Banga is the eleventh studio album by American rock musician Patti Smith, released on June 1, 2012, on Columbia Records. Recorded throughout 2011 at New York's Electric Lady Studios and Hoboken's Hobo Recorders, Banga was produced by Smith, Tony Shanahan, Jay Dee Daugherty and collaborator Lenny Kaye. The album includes a number of guest musicians including Tom Verlaine of Television, Italian band Casa del Vento, Jack Petruzzelli and Smith's own children, Jackson and Jesse Paris.

Inspired by Smith's "unique dreams and observations", the material on Banga focuses on "a wide range of human experience" and features songs about history, current affairs, death and nature. The album was announced alongside the release of its lead single, "April Fool", as a digital download on April 1, 2012.

== Recording ==
Banga was recorded throughout 2011 at Electric Lady Studios in New York. Speaking of the recording process, Smith said: "there's a certain innocence recording your first things that you can't recapture but we recorded this album in the same studio -- in Jimi Hendrix' studio Electric Lady -- with the same personnel, the same sense of idealism and even, by coincidence, the record is coming out on the anniversary of when we recorded my debut album Horses in 1974. These type of things, I always take them as good signs." The sessions were produced by Smith, Tony Shanahan, Jay Dee Daugherty and Lenny Kaye.

== Composition ==
The material on Banga is "inspired by Smith's unique dreams and observations" and the album's lyrics are "a reflection of our complex world – a world that is rife with chaos and beauty." Both the album's musical structure and lyrical themes vary. "Amerigo" is based on "imagining the voyage of Amerigo Vespucci to the New World in 1497" and "Fuji-san" is a rock song in tribute to the people of Japan following the 2011 Tōhoku earthquake and tsunami. "This is the Girl" is referred to as "a classic ballad" in memory of English musician Amy Winehouse and "Nine" is reportedly a birthday song for Smith's friend Johnny Depp. "Constantine's Dream" is a "ten-minute-plus improvisational meditation" and Smith has said " [in the song] there are many questions. It questions the role of artists in our society. The questions are there, and they're not answerable questions." "Maria" is partially based on actress Maria Schneider and the song Smith calls "the more emotional song on the record." Describing the song, Smith said: "it's the one that looks back on a beautiful time and sort of encapsulates the [1970s] in a certain way for me. It's a nice little R&B song, but an emotional song."

Smith told Q that part of the album had been written on the ill-fated cruise ship Costa Concordia.

== Packaging ==
In an interview on CBS News Sunday Morning on April 1, 2012, Smith explained the album's title: "for those who are curious, you can find what Banga is if you read The Master and Margarita by Bulgakov." In The Master and Margarita, Banga is Pontius Pilate's dog to whom Pilate could freely complain about the hemicrania that tortured him. Other songs on the album were also inspired by literature, particularly "April Fool," inspired by Nikolai Gogol.

The photos within the booklet of the CD detail part of the album's composition, in late 2011 aboard the Costa Concordia, months before she capsized off the coast of Italy. Smith and Kaye were invited by Jean-Luc Godard to accompany him while he was shooting his film Socialisme. Smith makes a brief cameo appearance in the film. The Banga CD booklet includes photos taken of Smith and her band during their cruise.

== Release ==
Banga was announced for released on April 1, 2012. The album's lead single, "April Fool," was released as a digital download on various online stores the same day. Prior to the album's release, Smith performed a one-off show at the Abbey Theatre in Dublin, Ireland with Sam Shepard on April 9 and debuted "This is the Girl" at a performance at the City Winery in New York on May 13. Banga was released on June 1 in Ireland, June 4 in the United Kingdom and June 5 in the United States. The album was issued on CD and LP with a special edition CD including a 64-page hardcover book of images, lyrics and liner notes and a bonus track titled "Just Kids."

Smith promoted the album with a 40-date European tour, beginning in Bergen, Norway on June 23 and concluding in London, United Kingdom on September 13. The tour included two legs in the United Kingdom, one in June and another in September. Smith also performed at a number of summer festivals including the ZMF Festival in Freiburg, Germany Bospop in Weert, Netherlands Stockholm Music and Arts Festival in Stockholm, Sweden and Electric Picnic in Stradbally, Ireland.

== Reception ==
Professional ratings
Aggregate scores
Source	Rating
Metacritic	81/100
Review scores
Source	Rating
AllMusic	4/5 stars
Drowned in Sound	7/10
Entertainment Weekly	A−
Filter	88%
The Guardian	4/5 stars
Los Angeles Times	3.5/4 stars
NME	8/10
Pitchfork	7.1/10
PopMatters	9/10
Rolling Stone	3.5/5 stars

Banga was released to widespread critical acclaim. At Metacritic, which assigns a normalised rating out of 100 to reviews from mainstream critics, the album received an average score of 81, based on 30 reviews, indicating "universal acclaim". AllMusic editor Thom Jurek awarded the album four out of five stars, writing that "the album is absent the dynamic, free-form chaos that marks her earlier recordings, but is better for it... it's not only provocative and expansive lyrically, but abundantly enjoyable musically." BBC reviewer Garry Mulholland gave the album a positive review, called Banga "the best Patti Smith album since Horses" and summarised that "no one else makes rock records as rich, poetic and sexy as this."

Drowned in Sound awarded the album a seven out of ten rating, with reviewer Len Lukowska calling it "a bit of musical beauty, some interesting lyricism and a pinch of hippy bollocks – still distinctly Patti Smith" but criticised the album's "poetic feel," describing it as a "veer into the territory of overblown." Entertainment Weekly gave the album an A− rating and said it was "her most energized in years, if not decades." Kurt Orzeck of FILTER awarded the album an 88% rating, writing "the beatnik punk-poet sings, speaks, testifies and scats her way through her new batch of bangers, carrying her characters into new worlds... sometimes [the songs on the album] are whimsical, sometimes they are terrifying, but they are always true to the human spirit." The Guardian reviewer Dave Simpson awarded the album four out of five stars, describing the album as "a mixture of pop songs and poetic explorations, aided by the instantly resumed chemistry between Kaye's shimmering hooks and Smith's sensual vocals" and noted that "the collision of sound and language is exhilarating."

Evelyn McDonnell of the Los Angeles Times gave the album a positive review, describing Banga as "an encyclopedia’s worth of literary, mythic, historical, religious and musical references; doo-wop ballads; epic guitars and guitar epics; quivering poems in headstand pose" and awarded the album three and a half out of four stars. NME gave the album an eight out of ten rating, calling it "a compelling balance between poetry and musicality," further noting that "the instrumentation soundtracks the imagery, rather than simply buffering it with noise" and citing the album as Smith's strongest vocal performance. Pitchfork editor Lindsay Zoladz gave the album a 7.1 out of 10, writing, "Banga meditates on ideas about exploration and adventure" but noted that "the shorter, less assuming tracks that best capture that spirit of discovery" and said "though neither a high point nor a low point in her freewheeling, four-decade career, Banga has the same charm of Smith's best albums: It flits with the impressionistic fascinations of a single mind." Rolling Stone reviewer Will Hermes awarded the album three and half stars out of five, saying that Banga "has sweet moments of song" but "the real magic happens when the words start flying off the grooves," citing "Constantine's Dream" as the album's stand-out track. Shah Salimat from Mediacorp xinmsn (MSN Singapore) said that Smith's voice "shines best unadorned for all to feel" and calls "Mosaic" the track "that will have you channeling your inner Stevie Nicks."

== Track listing ==
No.	Title	Writer(s)	Length
1.	"Amerigo"	Smith, Tony Shanahan	4:36
2.	"April Fool"	Smith, Shanahan	3:46
3.	"Fuji-san"	Smith, Lenny Kaye	4:12
4.	"This Is the Girl"	Smith, Shanahan, Stewart Lerman	3:49
5.	"Banga"	Smith	2:51
6.	"Maria"	Smith, Shanahan	5:05
7.	"Mosaic"	Smith, Jay Dee Daugherty	4:12
8.	"Tarkovsky (The Second Stop is Jupiter)"	Smith, Sun Ra	4:50
9.	"Nine"	Smith	5:02
10.	"Seneca"	Smith, Kaye	5:39
11.	"Constantine's Dream"	Smith, Kaye	10:19
12.	"After the Gold Rush"	Neil Young	4:13
Total length:			58:34

Deluxe edition bonus track
No.	Title	Writer(s)	Length
13.	"Just Kids"	Smith	4:28
Total length:			63:02

== Personnel ==
Musicians

- Patti Smith – vocals, producer
- Lenny Kaye – guitars, backing vocals (12), producer
- Tony Shanahan – bass, keyboards, backing vocals (12), producer
- Jay Dee Daugherty – drums, percussion, mandocello (7), backing vocals (12), producer

Additional musicians

- Tom Verlaine – guitar (2, 9)
- Jack Petruzzelli – guitar (1, 3–5, 7) Hammond organ (9)
- Jackson Smith – guitar (2, 4, 6, 8, 12)
- Jesse Smith – piano (8, 12)
- Johnny Depp – guitar, drums (5)
- Louie Appel – drums (1, 6)
- Rob Morsberger – piano (6)
- Maxim Moston – violin (1, 6)
- Entcho Todorov – violin (1, 6)
- Hiroko Taguchi – viola (1, 6)
- Dave Eggar – cello (1, 6)
- Luca Lanzi - vocals, guitar (10, 11)
- Riccardo Dellocchio - steel guitar (10, 11)
- Sauro Lanzi - accordion (10, 11)
- Massimilano Gregorio - bass (10, 11)
- Fabrizio Morganti - percussion (10, 11)
- Andreas Petermann - violin (10, 11)
- Mike Campbell - marimba (12)
- Tadhg Brady - vocals (12)
- Clea Payer - vocals (12)
- Fynn Payer - vocals (12)
- Kobyn Payer - vocals (12)

Technical personnel

- Stewart Lerman – engineer, recording, mixing
- Andrea Rovacchi – engineer, recording (10)
- Iestyn Polson – additional engineer
- Emery Dobyns – additional engineer
- Eric Spring – additional engineer
- Keenan Wyatt – additional engineer
- Pete Bischoff – assistant engineer
- Phil Joly – assistant engineer
- Elizabeth Bauer – assistant engineer
- Michael H. Brauer – mixing (3)
- Ryan Gilligan – mixing assistant, Pro Tools engineer (3)
- Greg Calbi – mastering

Design personnel

- Dave Bett - art direction
- Steve Sebring - photography, front cover
- Patti Smith - photography, Polaroids
  - Mount Fuji image courtesy of The Granger Collection, New York

== Charts ==
Chart (2012)	Peak position
Australian Albums (ARIA)	50
Austrian Albums (Ö3 Austria)	23
Belgian Albums (Ultratop Flanders)	10
Belgian Albums (Ultratop Wallonia)	18
Czech Albums (ČNS IFPI)	29
Danish Albums (Hitlisten)	7
Dutch Albums (Album Top 100)	37
Finnish Albums (Suomen virallinen lista)	21
French Albums (SNEP)	10
German Albums (Offizielle Top 100)	19
Irish Albums (IRMA)	83
Italian Albums (FIMI)	9
New Zealand Albums (RMNZ)	32
Norwegian Albums (VG-lista)	3
Portuguese Albums (AFP)	22
Scottish Albums (Official Charts)	47
Spanish Albums (Promusicae)	44
Swedish Albums (Sverigetopplistan)	10
Swiss Albums (Schweizer Hitparade)	12
UK Albums (Official Charts)	47
US Billboard 200	57
US Top Rock Albums (Billboard)	22

== Release history ==
Region	Date	Format(s)	Catalog
Ireland	June 1, 2012	CD, limited edition CD, digital download	88697222172
United Kingdom	June 4, 2012	CD, limited edition CD, digital download	88697222172
United States	June 5, 2012	CD, limited edition CD, digital download	88697222172
United States	June 26, 2012	LP	88697222172

=== Certifications ===
Region	Certification	Certified units/sales
United States	—	29,730
