= Twelve (Patti Smith album) =

Studio album of cover songs by Patti Smith
- Released: April 17, 2007
- Recorded: 2007
- Studios: Electric Lady Studios, New York City; Loho Studios, New York City; Effigy Studios, Ferndale, Michigan
- Genre: Rock
- Length: 56:41
- Label: Columbia
- Producers: Patti Smith, Jay Dee Daugherty, Lenny Kaye, Tony Shanahan

Patti Smith chronology
Trampin' (2004)	Twelve (2007)	Banga (2012)

Singles from Twelve
- 1. "Gimme Shelter" Released: 2007

Professional ratings
Aggregate scores
Source	Rating
Metacritic	65/100
Review scores
Source	Rating
AllMusic	4/5 stars
Blender	3/5 stars
Hot Press	6/10
Mojo	3/5 stars
NME	7/10
No Ripcord	9/10
The Observer	4/5 stars
Pitchfork Media	2.7/10
Rolling Stone	3.5/5 stars
Spin	2/5 stars

Twelve is the tenth studio album by Patti Smith, released April 17, 2007 on Columbia Records. The album contains twelve tracks, all of which are covers. It debuted on the Billboard 200 at number 60, with 11,000 copies sold in its first week. A promotional EP entitled Two More was also released, featuring two covers that are not on the album: "Perfect Day" by Lou Reed and "Here I Dreamt I Was an Architect" by the Decemberists.

== Track listing ==
No.	Title	Writer(s)	Original artists (date)	Length
1.	"Are You Experienced?"	Jimi Hendrix	The Jimi Hendrix Experience (1967)	4:46
2.	"Everybody Wants to Rule the World"	Roland Orzabal, Ian Stanley, Chris Hughes	Tears for Fears (1985)	4:07
3.	"Helpless"	Neil Young	Crosby, Stills, Nash & Young (1970)	4:02
4.	"Gimme Shelter"	Mick Jagger, Keith Richards	The Rolling Stones (1969)	5:00
5.	"Within You Without You"	George Harrison	The Beatles (1967)	4:51
6.	"White Rabbit"	Grace Slick	Jefferson Airplane (1967)	3:54
7.	"Changing of the Guards"	Bob Dylan	Bob Dylan (1978)	5:47
8.	"The Boy in the Bubble"	Paul Simon, Forere Motloheloa	Paul Simon (1986)	4:30
9.	"Soul Kitchen"	Jim Morrison, John Densmore, Ray Manzarek, Robby Krieger	The Doors (1967)	3:45
10.	"Smells Like Teen Spirit"	Kurt Cobain, Dave Grohl, Krist Novoselic	Nirvana (1991)	6:31
11.	"Midnight Rider"	Gregg Allman, Robert Payne	The Allman Brothers Band (1970)	4:02
12.	"Pastime Paradise"	Stevie Wonder	Stevie Wonder (1976)	5:26
13.	"Everybody Hurts" (Bonus track)	Bill Berry, Peter Buck, Mike Mills, Michael Stipe	R.E.M. (1992)	6:17

== Personnel ==
Band

- Patti Smith – vocals, clarinet
- Lenny Kaye – acoustic and electric guitar
- Jay Dee Daugherty – drums, percussion; accordion on "Helpless"
- Tony Shanahan – bass, keyboards, vocals

Additional personnel

- Andi Ostrowe – live sound mixing
- Barre Duryea – bass on "Helpless"
- David Bett – art direction
- Emery Dobyns – engineering, mixing
- Flea – bass on "Gimme Shelter" and "White Rabbit"
- Giovanni Sollima – cello on "Are You Experienced?"
- Greg Calbi – mastering
- Jack Petruzelli – acoustic guitar on "Within You Without You"
- Jackson Smith – guitar solo on "Everybody Wants to Rule the World"
- Jesse Smith – backing vocals on "Changing of the Guards"
- John Cohen – banjo on "Smells Like Teen Spirit"
- Luis Resto – piano on "Pastime Paradise"
- Mario Resto – drums on "Pastime Paradise"
- Paul Nowinski – double bass on "Pastime Paradise"
- Peter Stampfel – fiddle on "Smells Like Teen Spirit"
- Rich Robinson – dulcimer on "The Boy in the Bubble"; guitar on "Midnight Rider"
- Sam Shepard – banjo on "Smells Like Teen Spirit"
- Walker Shepard – banjo on "Smells Like Teen Spirit"
- Steven Sebring – photography
- Tom Verlaine – slide guitar on "Gimme Shelter"
- Duncan Webster – acoustic guitar on "Smells Like Teen Spirit"

== Charts ==
Chart (2007)	Peak position
Australian Albums (ARIA)	107
Austria	32
Belgium	28
Denmark	19
France	12
Germany	17
Ireland	74
Italy	6
Netherlands	41
New Zealand	30
Norway	35
Sweden	26
Switzerland	23
UK Albums Chart	63
U.S. Billboard 200	60
Billboard European Top 100 Albums	12

== Sales ==
Region	Certification	Certified units/sales
United States	—	11,000

== Release history ==
Date	Label	Format	Catalog
April 17, 2007	Columbia Records	CD	87251
