= Field of Fire (album) =

Studio album by Richard Lloyd
- Released: 1985
- Recorded: 1985
- Studio: Mistlurs Studio, Stockholm, Sweden
- Genre: Rock
- Label: Moving Target/Celluloid
- Producer: Richard Lloyd; Stefan Glaumann

Richard Lloyd chronology
Alchemy (1979)	Field of Fire (1985)	Real Time (1987)

Professional ratings
Review scores
Source	Rating
AllMusic	4/5 stars
The Village Voice	B+

Field of Fire is the second solo album by former Television guitarist Richard Lloyd. It was released in 1985, six years after his solo debut, Alchemy. The album was recorded in Stockholm, Sweden, backed mostly by Swedish musicians, some of them from the band Lolita Pop.

The liner notes state that the album is "dedicated to the lodestone". The album sleeve also includes a quote from St. Paul's epistle to the Romans (chapter 15, verse 13, NIV): "May the God of hope fill you with all joy and peace as you trust in him that you may overflow with hope by the power of the Holy Spirit."

== Track listing ==
All songs written by Richard Lloyd except as noted.

=== Side one ===
1. "Watch Yourself" - 3:10
2. "Losin' Anna" - 2:57
3. "Soldier Blue" - 4:04
4. "Backtrack" - 3:07
5. "Keep On Dancin" - 6:14

=== Side two ===
1. "Pleading" (Lloyd, Keith Patchel) - 3:57
2. "Lovin' Man" - 3:07
3. "Black to White" - 4:38
4. "Field of Fire" - 8:30

== Personnel ==
- Richard Lloyd - vocals, guitars, bass on "Soldier Blue", harmonica on "Backtrack"
- Keith Patchel - guitars, backing vocals on "Losin' Anna"
- Anders Åström - bass
- Thomas Johansson - bass on "Losin' Anna", "Pleading" and "Black to White"
- Christian Falk - bass on "Keep On Dancin"
- Peter Olsen - drums
- Ulf Sandquist - drums on "Soldier Blue", "Backtrack" and "Field of Fire"
- Per Eriksson - drums on "Keep On Dancin"
- Stefan Glaumann - percussion on "Keep On Dancin"

Technical

- Keith Patchel - production assistance
- Christer Åkerberg, Stefan Glaumann - engineer
