= Real Time (Richard Lloyd album) =

Live album by Richard Lloyd
- Released: 1987
- Recorded: April 1987
- Venue: CBGB, New York City
- Genre: Rock
- Label: Celluloid
- Producer: Steve Katz

Richard Lloyd chronology
Field of Fire (1985)	Real Time (1987)	The Cover Doesn't Matter (2001)

Real Time is a live album by the American musician Richard Lloyd, released in 1987. He supported it with a North American tour that included shows with the Go-Betweens.

== Production ==
Lloyd's manager had urged him to record a live EP, in part because his debut solo album had fallen out of print despite consumer demand for it. Real Time was produced by Steve Katz; he was chosen because Lloyd admired his work on Lou Reed's Rock 'n' Roll Animal and with the Blues Project and Blood, Sweat & Tears. It was recorded at CBGB, in New York City, after Lloyd had emerged from a period of heroin addiction and tentative career steps. The club had recently installed the mixing console that Herbie Hancock had used to record "Rockit". The album includes songs from Lloyd's first two solo albums as well as new material. "Fire Engine" is a cover of the 13th Floor Elevators song.

== Critical reception ==
Professional ratings
Review scores
Source	Rating
AllMusic	3.5/5 stars
Alternative Rock	6/10
Chicago Tribune	3/4 stars
The Encyclopedia of Popular Music	3/5 stars
The Great Indie Discography	5/10
Los Angeles Times	3/4 stars
MusicHound Rock: The Essential Album Guide	4/5 stars

The New York Times said that "the guitars sizzle and lunge and soar, the rhythms are driving and urgent, and the performers give the moment everything they've got." The Los Angeles Times stated that Real Time "captures an increasingly confident and clear-eyed Lou Reed disciple ... whose rock romanticism and rapturous solos compensate for the inconsistency of the songwriting." The Chicago Tribune said that Lloyd "runs through several tricky, inventive solos with a finesse and thoughtfulness that pretty much forestall any thoughts about 'star turns'." The Washington Post opined that Lloyd is "a weak lyricist, and even the best songs included on this disc ... seem only partially realized." The Evening Sun praised "the edgy psychedelia of 'Soldier Blue'". The Boston Globe noted that Lloyd's "blistering but tuneful leads often go in unexpected directions."

== Track listing ==
No.	Title	Length
1.	"Fire Engine"
2.	"Misty Eyes"
3.	"Alchemy"
4.	"Spider Talk"
5.	"Lost Child"
6.	"# 9"
7.	"The Only Feeling"
8.	"Soldier Blue"
9.	"Field of Fire"
10.	"Pleading"
11.	"Watch Yourself"
12.	"Lousin Anna"
13.	"Black to White"
