= Chris Purdy =

American musician and songwriter (born 1972)

Christopher Purdy (born September 1972) is an American musician and songwriter.

== Richard Lloyd ==
Typically associated with guitarist Richard Lloyd from the punk/CBGB band Television, Purdy played drums for Lloyd's Radiant Monkey and Jamie Neverts Story albums. He was involved in extensive touring with Lloyd, including the "Field of Fire Redux" tour where he was an original member of Lloyd's Sufi Monkeys.

== Other bands ==
Purdy was also a member of Dallas alternative band Slowpoke and appears on their LP Madchen (Grass Records) and their Ice Minus (Direct Hit) 7-inch vinyl release.

In 1994, he formed and fronted Texas power pop band Girl (not to be confused with the English band of the same name) with cousin Herman Suede and Jared Young. Their 10" EP entitled Triple Limes was released on Direct Hit records in 1996 and received favorable reviews, a few months before the band dissolved due to a revolving door of rhythm sections and lackluster audience support.

In the interim, Purdy played with Fury III, guitarist Nate Fowler's Elixer, Tommy Hale, Jasper Stone and Ruffled Feathers. In 2001 Purdy and Suede reconvened to form critical favorite Nope and produced the full length pop/rock CD Gettin Up The Rent (Backlash Records). Nope's album and demos brought them back to Lloyd's attention. Lloyd produced their 2004 album Competition at his NYC studio. The album proved to be their final work. After years of regional touring and numerous dates in New York and the eastern seaboard, the band broke up in 2006. Competition was never released despite generating numerous offers. In 2023, Purdy released three albums digitally via Contrampo Records- The Death of Richey, Fever Down, and 2nd Class Wolf. In 2024 he continued with Face the Muzak. All released under his name, Christopher Purdy, and another promised for 2025.
