= Peregrins (album) =

Studio album by Peregrins
- Released: 1989
- Genre: Alternative rock
- Label: MCA
- Producer: David Kershenbaum

Peregrins is an album by the alternative rock band Peregrins. It was released in 1989 via MCA, and is their only album.

== Critical reception ==
Professional ratings
Review scores
Source	Rating
AllMusic	4.5/5 stars
Chicago Tribune	3/4 stars

The album drew mostly positive reviews. Tom Moon, the critic for The Philadelphia Inquirer at the time, gave the album 2.5 stars out of four, writing that it is "slightly rough, slightly coy, slightly maniacal pop-rock, without the quirks or lyrical complexity of 10,000 Maniacs." Rodger Mullen, in The Fayetteville Observer, called it "a sometimes-rocking, sometimes-reflective set of songs distinguished mainly by the soaring vocals of Diedre Steinschneider."

== Track listing ==
- All songs written by Deidre Steinschneider and Jeffrey Dresher.
1. "Let It Go"
2. "Always Tomorrow"
3. "True Believer"
4. "History of the World"
5. "Innocent Eyes"
6. "Broken Man"
7. "Peace of Mind"
8. "Passers By"
9. "It's a Word"
10. "Empty Air"
11. "Tall Tale"

== Personnel ==
Peregrins

- Deirdre Steinschneider - vocals
- Jeffrey Dresher - guitar
- Eve Moon - guitar, background vocals
- Fred Smith - bass
- Julius Klepacz - drums

with:

- Bob Kinkel - organ on "Peace of Mind" and "Tall Tale"
- Bob Marlett - piano on "History of the World"
- Harold Payne - backing vocals on "Always Tomorrow"

== Release Information ==
MCA 6288. Released in 1989.
