= Peregrins =

- Origin: USA
- Genres: Alternative rock
- Years active: 1989
- Label: MCA

Peregrins were an alternative rock band. Bassist Fred Smith was a founding member of Blondie and recorded with Television during that band's critical peak in the late-1970s. True Believer peaked at number 15 on college radio in August, 1989.

== Personnel ==
- Deirdre Steinschneider, lead vocals
- Jeffrey Dresher, guitars
- Julius Klepacz, drums
- Eve Moon, guitar and backing vocals
- Fred Smith, bass

== Discography ==
- Peregrins LP/CD (MCA 6288) - 1989
- True Believer 12" vinyl/CD Single (MCA 8961) - 1989
