= Shoot First and Pray You Live =

2008 film

Shoot First and Pray You Live (Because Luck Has Nothing to Do With It)
- Directed by: Lance Doty
- Screenplay by: Lance Doty
- Starring: John Doman; Jim Gaffigan; Jeff Hephner
- Cinematography: Bruce McCleery
- Edited by: Charly Bender
- Music by: Keith Patchel
- Distributed by: Grindstone Entertainment Group
- Release date: December 4, 2008 (Santa Fe Film Festival)
- Running time: 1:50:00
- Country: United States
- Language: English

Shoot First and Pray You Live (Because Luck Has Nothing to Do With It) is a 2008 American Spaghetti Western film written and directed by Lance Doty and based on the novel Luck by Max Brand. Filming took place in Santa Fe, New Mexico.

== Premise ==
Red Pierre was trained to fight and now he shall use those skills to seek revenge on the people who hurt his family.

== Cast ==
- John Doman as Jim Boone
- Jim Gaffigan as Mart Ryder
- Jeff Hephner as Red Pierre
- Tamara Hope as Irene Melody
- Richard Tyson as Gandil Morgan
- Clay Wilcox as Dick Wilbur
- Shannon Zeller as Jack Boone
- James Russo as Bob McGurk
- Chris Browning as Patterson
- Fredrick Lopez as Venalez
- Stephen Payne as Mac Hurley
- Luce Rains as Phil Branch

== Reception ==
The Indianapolis Business Journal reviewed the movie, stating that "In case you couldn't tell from the film's title, this movie is full of bad dialogue and mildly absurd story lines. But if you have ever wondered what kind of movie would arise if you melded "Kill Bill," "A Fistful of Dollars" and "The Outlaw Josie [sic] Wales," this movie is for you." The Santa Fe New Mexican also reviewed the film, writing "For a low-budget oater, Shoot First is surprisingly well shot, well acted, and mostly well scripted (though it's a bit talky and repetitious in places)."

=== Awards ===
- Independent Spirit Award at the Santa Fe Film Festival (2008, won)
