= Adventure (Television album) =

Studio album by Television
- Released: April 1978
- Recorded: September–November 1977
- Studios: Soundmixers and the Record Plant, New York City
- Genres: Art punk; punk rock; new wave
- Length: 37:09
- Label: Elektra
- Producers: John Jansen; Tom Verlaine

Television chronology
Marquee Moon (1977)	Adventure (1978)	The Blow-Up (1982)

Adventure is the second album by the American rock band Television, released in April 1978 by Elektra Records.

== Musical style ==
The music of Adventure have been described as art punk, punk rock and new wave. On the album's sound, Mark Deming of AllMusic writes, "Where Marquee Moon was direct and straightforward in its approach, with the subtleties clearly in the performance and not in the production, Adventure is a decidedly softer and less aggressive disc, and while John Jansen's production isn't intrusive, it does round off the edges of the band's sound in a way Andy Johns' work on the first album did not."

== Reception ==
Professional ratings
Review scores
Source	Rating
AllMusic	4.5/5 stars
Blender	5/5 stars
Entertainment Weekly	B+
Pitchfork	7.7/10
Rolling Stone	4/5 stars
The Rolling Stone Album Guide	4/5 stars
Spin Alternative Record Guide	9/10
The Village Voice	A−

Ken Emerson of Rolling Stone wrote, "By daring to be different, Adventure lives up to its title, but it also comes as something of a disappointment because it lacks the jagged tension and mysterious drama that imbued last year's Marquee Moon with such dark but lucid power." Robert Christgau of The Village Voice was favorable, writing, "I agree that it's not as urgent, or as satisfying, but that's only to say that Marquee Moon was a great album while Adventure is a very good one. The difference is more a function of material than of the new album's relatively clean, calm, reflective mood. The lyrics on Marquee Moon were shot through with visionary surprises that never let up. These are comparatively songlike, their apercus concentrated in hook lines that are surrounded by more quotidian stuff." Music critic Dave Thompson called Adventure "fabulous", describing it as "a punk album without a single punk element."

== Track listing ==
All tracks are written by Tom Verlaine, except "Days", written by Verlaine and Richard Lloyd.

Side A
No.	Title	Length
1.	"Glory"	3:11
2.	"Days"	3:14
3.	"Foxhole"	4:48
4.	"Careful"	3:18
5.	"Carried Away"	5:14

Side B
No.	Title	Length
1.	"The Fire"	5:56
2.	"Ain't That Nothin'"	4:52
3.	"The Dream's Dream"	6:44

CD reissue bonus tracks
No.	Title	Length
9.	"Adventure"	5:38
10.	"Ain't That Nothin'" (single version)	3:55
11.	"Glory" (early version)	3:39
12.	"Ain't That Nothin'" (instrumental)	9:47

== Personnel ==
Television

- Billy Ficca – drums
- Richard Lloyd – guitar (solos on "Days" and "Ain't That Nothin'"), vocals
- Fred Smith – bass, vocals
- Tom Verlaine – lead vocals, guitar (all solos except where noted), keyboards, production

Technical

- Craig Bishop – engineering
- Jay Borden – engineering
- John Jansen – production, engineering
- Paul Jansen – art direction
- Gray Russell – engineering
- Gerrit van der Meer – photography
