= Jimmy Rip =

American musician

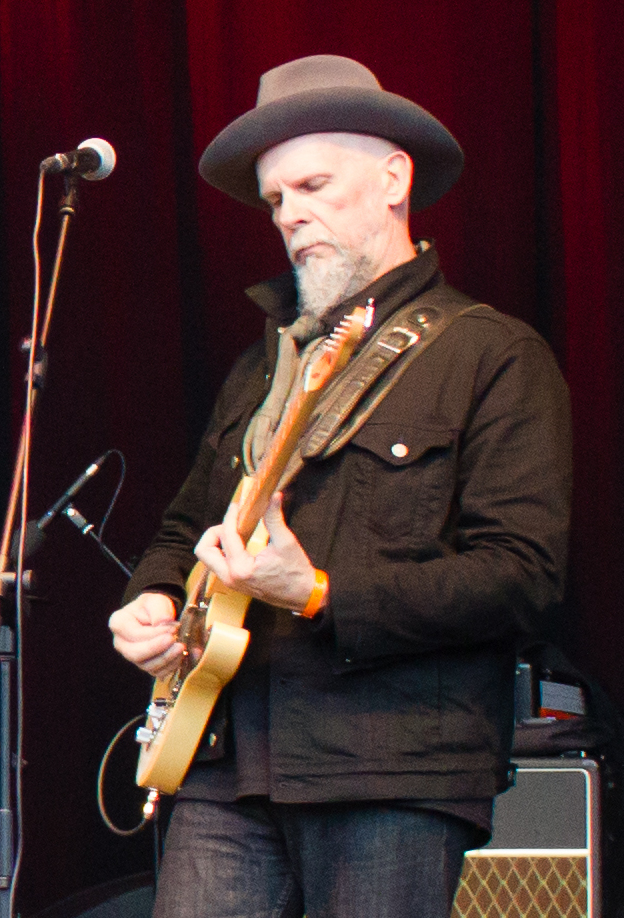
- Jimmy Rip playing with Television in Brazil, 2014

Background information
- Born: March 13, 1956 (age 70); New York City, U.S.
- Genres: Rock; blues; punk rock; post-punk; new wave
- Occupations: Musician, producer, composer, musical arranger
- Instrument: Guitar
- Years active: 1980–present
- Formerly of: Television
- Website: Jimmy Rip

Jimmy Rippetoe (born March 13, 1956), better known by his stage name Jimmy Rip, is an American guitarist, songwriter and record producer, who is known for his work with Jerry Lee Lewis, Mick Jagger, Debbie Harry, Paul Collins & the Beat, Jack Bruce, Michael Monroe, Henry Lee Summer, Tom Verlaine and Television. Rip began playing guitar at the age of six.

Rip became lead guitarist for Paul Collins & the Beat in 1983. He played on their album To Beat Or Not To Beat and was featured in their music videos.

He worked with Jagger on his solo album Wandering Spirit and released his first solo album in 1997, called Way Past Blue.

In 2006, Rip worked as a producer and guitarist with Jerry Lee Lewis for his album Last Man Standing. A year later, he joined Television after the departure of guitarist Richard Lloyd.

Since then, he has been working on a new album with Television, and on a second solo effort. In 2009, after the South American and European tour he completed work on the debut album of the Croatian rock band, Voodoo Lizards.

He currently plays in Buenos Aires, Argentina and leads his own band, called Jimmy Rip and The Trip. In this country, he has produced and collaborated with artists of great international recognition, such as Pappo, Ratones Paranoicos, Los Piojos, Airbag, among others.
