= Tom Verlaine =

American singer and guitarist (1949–2023)

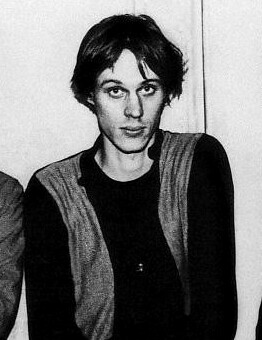
- Verlaine in 1977

Background information
- Born: Thomas Joseph Miller; December 13, 1949; Denville, New Jersey, U.S.
- Origin: Wilmington, Delaware, U.S.
- Died: January 28, 2023 (aged 73) New York City, U.S.
- Genres: Punk rock; art punk; new wave; post punk
- Occupations: Musician, singer, songwriter, producer
- Instruments: Guitar; vocals; piano; saxophone
- Formerly of: Television; Neon Boys

Thomas Joseph Miller (December 13, 1949 – January 28, 2023), known professionally as Tom Verlaine, was an American singer, guitarist, and songwriter, most notable as the frontman of the New York City rock band Television.

== Biography ==
Verlaine was born Thomas Joseph Miller in Denville, New Jersey, on December 13, 1949. His father, Victor Andrew Miller (1921–2008), was of Lithuanian heritage (originally Miliszauckas), but born in Coatbridge, Scotland. His mother, Lillian (Lilya) Barbara Dopko(wski) (1921–2005), was originally from Pennsylvania and of Polish heritage. Tom's father worked first as a maintenance man and later as a sales manager. Tom had a twin brother, John Peter Miller (1949–1984), who died suddenly at age 34.

Tom moved to Wilmington, Delaware, with his family when he was six. He began studying piano at an early age, but switched to saxophone in middle school after hearing a record by Stan Getz. Jazz saxophonists such as John Coltrane and Albert Ayler inspired him. Verlaine initially was unimpressed with the role of the guitar in both rock music and jazz, but was inspired to take up the instrument after hearing the Rolling Stones' "19th Nervous Breakdown" during his adolescence, at which point he began a long period of experimentation to develop a personal style. A later musical influence were Miles Davis' electric-period recordings, particularly the Japanese LPs Agharta (1975) and Dark Magus (1977), which he was able to obtain as imports.

Tom's family sent Verlaine and his twin brother John to Sanford Preparatory School, a private boarding school in Hockessin, Delaware. While John excelled in athletics and graduated in 1967, Tom leaned toward writing and poetry. At Sanford, Tom became friends with future bandmate and punk icon Richard Hell (Richard Meyers). They quickly discovered that they shared a passion for music and poetry. Neither Verlaine nor Hell graduated from Sanford and they later moved to New York City.

In New York City, Miller created his stage name, a reference to the French symbolist poet Paul Verlaine. Regarding the name change, rather than the poet being a source of inspiration, Verlaine said, "I just like the sound of the name”. He and Hell formed the Neon Boys, recruiting drummer Billy Ficca. The Neon Boys quickly disbanded after failing to recruit a second guitarist, despite auditions by Dee Dee Ramone and Chris Stein. They reformed as Television a few months later, finding a guitarist in Richard Lloyd, and began playing at seminal punk clubs like CBGB and Max's Kansas City. In 1975, Verlaine kicked Hell out of the band for his erratic playing and behavior, and they released their first single with Fred Smith replacing Hell. Television released two albums, Marquee Moon and Adventure, to great critical acclaim and modest sales before breaking up in July 1978.

In 1974, Verlaine dated poet and musician Patti Smith. They co-wrote a book of poetry, The Night, with Smith's poems on the odd-numbered pages and Verlaine's on the even ones. A planned follow-up poetry book, to be called Independence Day, was never issued.

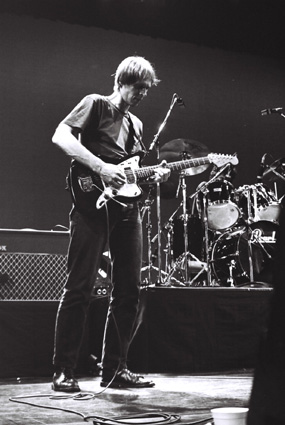
Verlaine during an early 1990s reunion tour with Television

Verlaine soon released a self-titled solo album that began a fruitful 1980s solo career. He took up residence in England for a brief period in response to the positive reception his work had received there and in Europe at large. David Bowie covered Verlaine's "Kingdom Come" on his Scary Monsters (and Super Creeps) album in 1980. In the 1990s he collaborated with different artists, including Patti Smith, and composed a film score for Love and a .45. In the early 1990s, Television reformed to record one studio album (Television) and a live recording (Live at the Academy, 1992); they reunited periodically for touring. Verlaine released his first new album in many years in 2006, titled Songs and Other Things. In the 2010s, he kept on touring with Television, performing Marquee Moon in its entirety: he notably toured in Europe in 2014 and 2016.

On January 9, 2026, the New York Times announced that Verlaine's archive of lyric drafts, unpublished poetry, notebooks, studio and rehearsal tapes were acquired by the New York Public Library for the Performing Arts.

== Death ==
Verlaine died in New York City on January 28, 2023, at the age of 73. According to his former Television bandmate, Richard Lloyd, Verlaine had "been sick for quite a while" with prostate cancer which had metastasized. His longtime partner, Jutta Koether, saw signs of frailty as early as 2019; when she saw Verlaine again in 2021, he looked "like a skeleton". Television had been asked to open a European tour for Billy Idol, but Verlaine's doctors told him he was not in good enough health to do so.

== Collaborations ==
Verlaine produced Jeff Buckley's second album shortly before Buckley's death by drowning in 1997.

Verlaine guested as guitarist on numerous releases by other artists, including the album Penthouse by the band Luna. He played on Patti Smith's Grammy-nominated "Glitter in Their Eyes" from her 2000 album Gung Ho. This was not the first time Verlaine had collaborated with one-time romantic partner Smith; four years earlier, he played on the songs "Fireflies" and "Summer Cannibals" from her 1996 album Gone Again, and in the 1970s he played guitar on her debut single "Hey Joe" and on "Break It Up" from her debut album Horses. He also co-wrote the latter song with Smith. He played with Smith in 2005 for a 30th-anniversary concert of Horses in its entirety, which was later released on CD.

Verlaine was part of the Million Dollar Bashers, a supergroup also featuring Sonic Youth musicians Lee Ranaldo and Steve Shelley, Wilco guitarist Nels Cline, Bob Dylan bassist Tony Garnier, guitarist Smokey Hormel, and keyboardist John Medeski. Their work appears on the original soundtrack to I'm Not There, a biographical film reflecting on the life of Bob Dylan.

In 2012, Verlaine collaborated with former Smashing Pumpkins guitarist James Iha on his second solo album Look to the Sky. The same year, he played on Japanese DJ and producer Yasushi Ide's "Shadows of Fire."

== Musical style ==
=== Equipment ===
Throughout his career Verlaine played a variety of Fender guitars, most frequently Jazzmasters and Jaguars, through Fender and Vox amps. On his reasons for choosing the Jazzmaster, Verlaine said, "I think it was financial! In the seventies, when guitars were still cheap, nobody wanted a Jazzmaster because they weren't loud and didn't stay in tune. In '73/'74 you could buy a Jazzmaster for $150 easily. So that's why I started playing it, because we didn't have a lot of money and they were cheap. And then I really got used to it, plus the vibrato arm on it is very nice. I use really heavy strings on it—like a 14 to a 58 or something similar—and that's another part of the sound, I think."

In later years at solo concerts and at Television concerts, Verlaine played a guitar built by Roger Sadowsky, consisting of a unfinished Sadowsky body (cut down, not a full sized Strat), vintage lipstick tubes, and a bound 60's Jazzmaster neck.

=== Guitar playing and effects ===
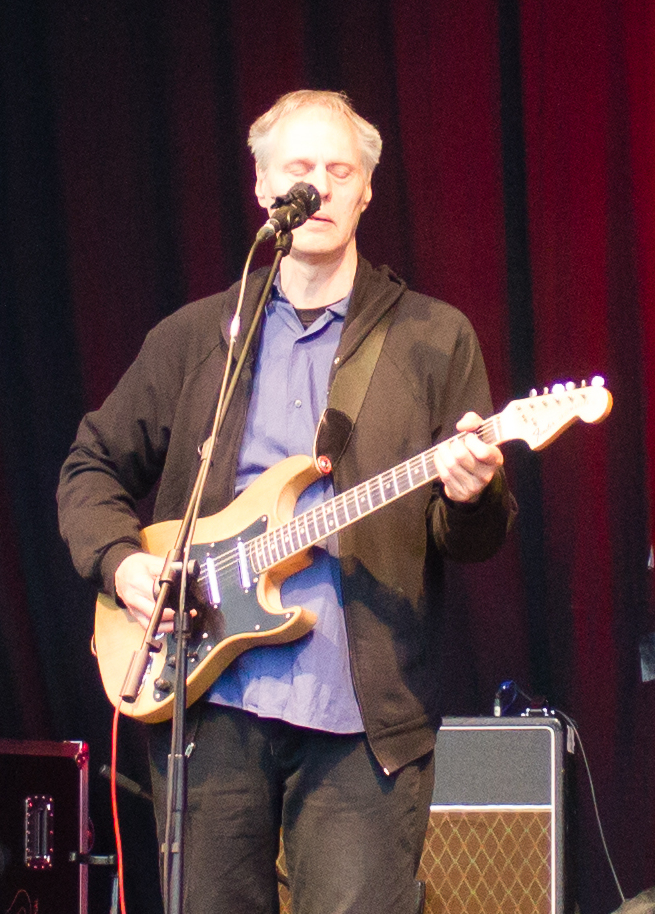
Verlaine in 2014

Verlaine was an advocate of guitar techniques and recording processes including close miking, delay, reverb, slap echo, phasing/flanging, tremolo, etc. Television's first commercially released recording, "Little Johnny Jewel", saw Verlaine, in defiance of common practice, plugging his guitar straight into the recording desk with no amplification. Verlaine rarely employed heavy distortion.

Vibrato was a large part of Verlaine's style and he made extensive use of the Jazzmaster's vibrato arm. Additionally he would often employ 'cello vibrato' with his fingers. Verlaine used a thin pick and heavy strings; on later recordings .013 to .050 (.014/.015 to .056 in earlier years), and from the early 1990s onwards he tuned down a half-step or more. Verlaine played with the bridge pickup on, but picked over the neck pickup. This, according to him, gave a "full yet clear sound".

The development of Verlaine's style likely was influenced by the way he learned to play; he told a Guitar Player interviewer in 2005 "I never played guitar along with records, so I never learned all the speed licks everybody gravitates to when starting out. I know 19-year-old guitarists who can play Danny Gatton solos note-for-note. They don't really know what notes they're playing, but they do them flawlessly."

== Discography ==
=== With Television ===
- Marquee Moon (Elektra) (1977)
- Adventure (Elektra) (1978)
- Television (Capitol) (1992)

=== Solo albums ===
- Tom Verlaine (1979)
- Dreamtime (1981)
- Words from the Front (1982)
- Cover (1984)
- Flash Light (1987)
- The Wonder (1990)
- Warm and Cool (1992, reissued in 2005)
- The Miller's Tale: A Tom Verlaine Anthology (1996)
- Songs and Other Things (2006)
- Around (2006)

=== Singles ===
- "Always" / "The Blue Robe" Warner Bros K17855 (September 1981)
- "Postcard from Waterloo" / "Clear It Away" Virgin VS501 (May 1982)
- "Let Go the Mansion" / "Let Go the Mansion - Instrumental version" Virgin VS696 (June 1984)
- "Five Miles of You" / "Your Finest Hour" Virgin VS704 (August 1984) "Your Finest Hour" was an outtake from Words From the Front sessions
- "A Town Called Walker" / "Smoother Than Jones" Fontana FTANA1 (1987)
- "The Funniest Thing" / "One Time at Sundown" (The London 1986 Version) Fontana VLANE3 (1987)
- "The Scientist Writes a Letter" / "The Scientist Writes a Letter" (Paris Version) Fontana VLANE4 (1987)
- "Cry Mercy, Judge" / "Circling" Fontana FTANA2 (1987)
- "Shimmer" / "Bomb" Fontana VLANE5 (October 1989)
- "Kaleidoscopin'" / "Sixteen Tulips" Fontana VLANE6 (March 1990)

=== With Patti Smith ===
- Horses (1975)
- Gone Again (1996)
- Gung Ho (2000)
- Twelve (2007)
- Banga (2012)

== Sources ==
- Guinness Rockopedia – ISBN 0-85112-072-5
- The Great Rock Discography (Fifth Edition) – ISBN 1-84195-017-3
