= Richard Lloyd (guitarist) =

American guitarist (1951–2026)

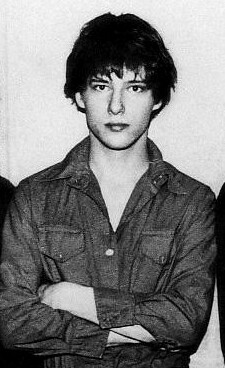
- Lloyd in 1977

Background information
- Born: Richard John Alt; October 25, 1951; Pittsburgh, Pennsylvania, U.S.
- Died: November 7, 2026 (aged 75) Chattanooga, Tennessee, U.S.
- Genres: Rock; new wave; punk rock; art punk; post-punk
- Occupations: Musician; songwriter
- Instruments: Guitar; vocals
- Years active: 1973–2026
- Formerly of: Television
- Website: richardlloyd.com

Richard Lloyd (born Richard John Alt; October 25, 1951 – November 7, 2026) was an American guitarist and songwriter, best known as a founding member of the rock band Television.

== Early life ==
Born as Richard John Alt in Pittsburgh, Pennsylvania, on October 25, 1951, Lloyd first became interested in music as a child.

Lloyd attended Stuyvesant High School in New York City. In his early teens, he studied drums with William Kessler, who was the ghostwriter for Cozy Cole, one of the famous big-band drummers. A few years later, he turned to the guitar.

== Teenage years ==
When Lloyd was in his middle teens, he met a fellow guitarist from Brooklyn named Velvert Turner. Turner claimed he knew Jimi Hendrix. Per Turner, Hendrix considered Turner his "little brother", and took him on as his protégé, inviting him to various clubs and teaching him guitar from Hendrix's apartment on W 12th Street. As Turner and Lloyd were best friends, Turner asked for permission to teach Lloyd what he was learning, and so Lloyd and Turner began practicing together under the teaching auspice of Hendrix. Lloyd frequently attended Hendrix's shows, as well as those of other well-known acts such as Led Zeppelin, The Who, The Jeff Beck Group with Rod Stewart, The Allman Brothers Band, and the Grateful Dead.

At Stuyvesant High School, during the 11th grade, Lloyd decided he wanted to become a well-known guitarist, so he stopped bringing his textbooks or homework to school and instead brought an electric guitar in a hardshell case. When his teachers would ask him where his schoolbooks were, he would point to the case. Being asked to open the case, the teachers would proclaim, "I don't see any books in there only an electric guitar", and Lloyd's retort was, "That's the book I'm studying." He still managed to pass all of his tests but quit in May 1969, before graduation, because he did not believe in diplomas, and he considered that having a high school diploma would not do him any good in his pursuit of the music business. That summer his parents moved to Montclair, New Jersey, and gave him an ultimatum: he could either get a job or repeat the 12th grade in a new high school. He chose the latter, which led to his deep friendship with another guitarist named Al Anderson, who went on to be one of a couple of Americans to play in Bob Marley's touring band, The Wailers, along with Donald Kinsey.

== Early music career ==
After quitting a second high school before graduation, he moved to Boston, where he lived for two years. It was during this time that he enjoyed his first public performance, sitting in with John Lee Hooker at the Jazz workshop on Boylston Street. By this time Lloyd had already met and knew Jimi Hendrix, Buddy Guy, and members of Led Zeppelin, and could be frequently found backstage conversing with his heroes. John Lee Hooker asked him what he did and Lloyd replied that he was a guitarist, whereupon John Lee Hooker called him over and whispered into his ear "the secret of the electric guitar" and invited him to sit in with the band. After living in Boston for a period of time, Lloyd moved back to New York, but desired to visit other centers of musical culture. He first decided to hitchhike across Route 66, but after considering how long it might take, he flew directly to Los Angeles instead. He spent the next two years in Los Angeles from 1971, practicing the electric guitar without an amplifier and attending record company parties, which were very ostentatious at that time. He lived as a roommate with Richard Cromelin, the music critic for the Los Angeles Times, so again, he had access to the highest level and echelon of rock 'n roll.

In 1973, he heard about the New York Dolls and the beginning of a brand-new New York scene, so he arranged with a friend who owned a Lotus Europa to take him as a passenger across the country. As they made their way through the country, with stops in famous towns like Memphis and New Orleans, he reached New York and heard the unpleasant news that the Mercer Arts Center, known for hosting the first concerts of bands like the Dolls, the Modern Lovers and Suicide, had collapsed. He began frequenting shows at the Diplomat Hotel and other spots, and seeing the possibility of a new scene, began contemplating putting a band together. He met Terry Ork at Max's Kansas City, who had a huge loft in Chinatown and needed a roommate, so Lloyd moved into Ork's Chinatown loft, living in the front room, a small room facing East Broadway. Ork worked for Andy Warhol making silkscreen prints at night and working at a theatrical poster shop called Cinemabilia during the daytime. Ork very much wanted to manage or create a band such as Warhol had done with The Velvet Underground. During discussions with Lloyd, Ork mentioned that he knew of another guitarist without a band who was auditioning a couple of songs at Reno Sweeney's audition night. Reno Sweeney's was an off-Broadway-style club on W. 13th St that mostly hosted singers like Peter Allen and Bette Midler.

== Television ==
Ork and Lloyd went to Reno Sweeney's one night during the summer of 1973, where Richard saw Tom Miller play three songs. Lloyd leaned over to Ork during the second song and told him that this fellow had something, but was missing something, and what he was missing, Lloyd had. He advised Ork that if he [Terry] could convince Tom, the combination of Lloyd and Miller would make the band Ork was looking for. This was the beginning of the formation of the band Television. Miller would eventually change his last name to Verlaine and Richard Meyers became Richard Hell and promised to learn the bass as they went along. With the addition of Billy Ficca on drums, the quartet was complete, though Hell would be replaced by Fred Smith in 1975. Television rehearsed seven days a week for five or six hours a day during the fall and winter of 1973, and made their first public performance on March 2, 1974, at the Town House Theatre on W. 44th St.

Television were looking for a club where they could develop an audience and play more often as the house band, when Verlaine spotted a guy putting up the awning on a bar on the Bowery which stood under a flophouse for homeless alcoholics. Verlaine and Lloyd went back up and discussed the possibility of playing in this new club, which was to be called CBGB. After Television's manager Ork promised CBGB a large take at the bar, Television was given a gig at the end of March 1974. CBGB was run by Hilly Kristal, who had planned to feature country, bluegrass and blues (CBGB) at the club, but when several original rock bands like Blondie, the Ramones and Talking Heads started to show up after finding out that there was a place to play, Ork became the official booking agent for the club. CBGB started to get noticed after bands like Television and Talking Heads started to fill the place up, and when a young poet named Patti Smith began playing double bills with Television, the club started becoming famous. CBGB closed its doors in New York in 2007.

Television was signed to Elektra Records in 1977. They recorded two albums for Elektra: Marquee Moon and Adventure. As a debut release in 1977, Marquee Moon remains on lists of greatest albums in rock and roll history, and never has been out of print. After recording Adventure in 1978, and finding success elusive in the United States, Television disbanded after a successful series of dates at New York's The Bottom Line. The various members went their separate ways, although all of them continued in the music industry, occasionally to reunite.

== Solo career ==
In 1978, a single of Lloyd's song, "I Thought You Wanted to Know," was released with guitar and harmony vocal by an uncredited Lloyd and lead vocal, bass, and piano by Chris Stamey. The release was credited to Chris Stamey and the dB's, although Stamey was the only dB to appear on the recording.

After Television first disbanded in 1978, Lloyd released a solo album for Elektra Records, titled Alchemy. His solo career included work as a guitarist and session musician for various artists including Matthew Sweet, John Doe (of the band X), and Swiss singer-songwriter Stephan Eicher. In 1990, Lloyd recorded a version of the Roky Erickson/13th Floor Elevators song "Fire Engine", which was included on the tribute album compilation Where the Pyramid Meets the Eye. In 1989, he appeared on several tracks of Matthew Sweet's second album, Earth; in 1991 he contributed guitar parts to Sweet's critically-acclaimed album Girlfriend. As of 2006, he had appeared on six of Sweet's studio albums.

Lloyd is known to have taught other aspiring guitarists in his studio in New York City, where he frequently produced other acts. He acted as producer, recording engineer and band member on the Rocket from the Tombs album Rocket Redux, released on Smog Veil Records. He also produced a number of records for other New York bands, including The Blondes, Inc., Christopher Purdy, Miss Mother USA and Kevin Otto; as well as Skinny Girls Are Trouble (2010), the third album by country-punk songwriter Jim Neversink. His other projects at the time of his death included a reformation of Rocket from the Tombs. He still owned the famous pinstriped Stratocaster he played with Television.

In 1994, he was cast in plaster by Cynthia Plaster Caster.

As of 2016, Lloyd had released seven solo albums, beginning with Alchemy in 1979, Field of Fire in 1986 (reissued in 2007 with an additional disc of music), the live disc Real Time in 1987 (recorded at CBGB) and The Cover Doesn't Matter in 2001. The Radiant Monkey was released on Parasol Records in late 2007. The CD features Lloyd on everything but drums (played by session drummer Chris Purdy, with Television's Billy Ficca on one track). The Jamie Neverts Story, released on Parasol in 2009, was Lloyd's tribute to his hero, Jimi Hendrix; and was dedicated to the memory of his friend Velvert Turner; "Jamie Neverts" was the secret name that Velvert and Lloyd came up with to prevent all the kids in the neighborhood from trying to come along when they went to see Hendrix.

In 2010, he released Lodestones, sometimes referred to as Nuggets From the Vault. It was issued on vinyl in 2018 for Record Store Day. Of the album, Lloyd said: "I found a large box of unmarked cassettes going back quite a few years. When I began listening to them, I found a number of finished products – songs that for some reason I [had] failed to put on records. [I] got a machine to transfer the cassettes to CDs and I transferred [the] CDs to my machine at my studio and mastered them. When finished I had a 10 song record.". According to Lloyd's website, other players on the record are John Klages and David Leonard on rhythm guitar, and most likely Steve Cohen on bass and Ed Shockley on drums. In 2016, he released Rosedale. While Lloyd plays all the instruments on most of the album, Billy Ficca and Chris Frantz also play on a few tracks, and local musicians bassist Terry Clouse and drummer Jeff Brakebill from his new hometown of Chattanooga, Tennessee, are also featured. In 2018, Lloyd published his memoir, Everything Is Combustible: Television, CBGB's and Five Decades of Rock and Roll.

== Personal life and death ==
In 2015, Lloyd married Sheila O'Keefe. His memoir was dedicated to her, and Lisa Lloyd's son Dylan.

In March 2026, Lloyd was diagnosed with cholangiocarcinoma. He died at his home in Chattanooga, Tennessee, on November 7, 2026, at the age of 75.

== Solo discography ==
- Alchemy (Elektra, 1979)
- Field of Fire (Moving Target/Celluloid, 1986) – later released on CD by Reaction Recordings (c/o Parasol Records)
- Real Time (1987)
- The Cover Doesn't Matter (2001)
- The Radiant Monkey (2007)
- The Jamie Neverts Story (2009)
- Lodestones (2010 [digital only]; reissued on LP in 2018 by Org Music)
- Rosedale (2016)
- The Countdown (2018)
