= Jay Dee Daugherty =

American drummer and songwriter

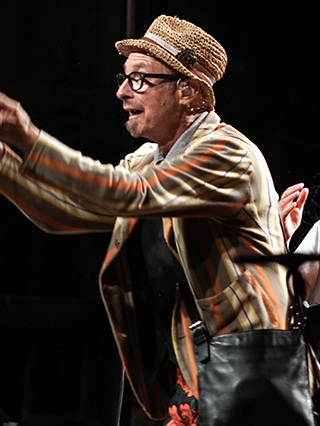
- Daugherty with Patti Smith in 2017

Background information
- Born: March 22, 1952 (age 73); Santa Barbara, California, U.S.
- Origin: New York City, U.S.
- Genres: Rock, proto-punk
- Occupation(s): Drummer, songwriter
- Instrument(s): Drums, percussion
- Years active: 1974–present
- Labels: Arista, Columbia

Jay Dee Daugherty (born March 22, 1952) is an American drummer and songwriter most known for his work with Patti Smith.

== Biography ==
Moving to New York City in 1974, Jay Dee Daugherty co-founded the Mumps with high school friends Lance Loud and Kristian Hoffman. He began playing with Patti Smith in 1975 after a brief stint as her sound man. During a hiatus while Smith healed from a serious injury from a fall off a stage, he helped rock journalist Lester Bangs form a band that included guitarist Robert Quine. He produced Bang's 7" vinyl debut, and the debut single by New York City no wave band Mars.

After the disbanding of the Patti Smith Group in 1979, Daugherty toured with and played on all of Tom Verlaine's solo projects. He performed and recorded with Willie Nile, CBGB's houseband, The Revelons with Fred Smith of Television, The Roches, The Beat, Richard Barone, Holly Beth Vincent, and Richard Lloyd when not sitting in with Billy Idol, Mark Knopfler, Washington Squares, and Joey Ramone. A jam session with The Waterboys' Mike Scott turned into a recurring relationship, including recording and extensive touring during their halcyon Fisherman's Blues period. Patti Smith Group fans Indigo Girls recruited Daugherty to play on their Grammy Award winning multi-platinum second album, Indigo Girls. Re-locating to Sydney, he was a member of Australian rock band The Church from 1990 to 1993.

Since Patti Smith's re-emergence in 1995, Daugherty has continued to perform with her as a musician, co-writer, and co-producer. With Lenny Kaye and Tony Shanahan, he forms the house band for the annual Tibet House US benefit concerts at Carnegie Hall.

== See also ==
- List of drummers
