= Television (band) =

American rock band

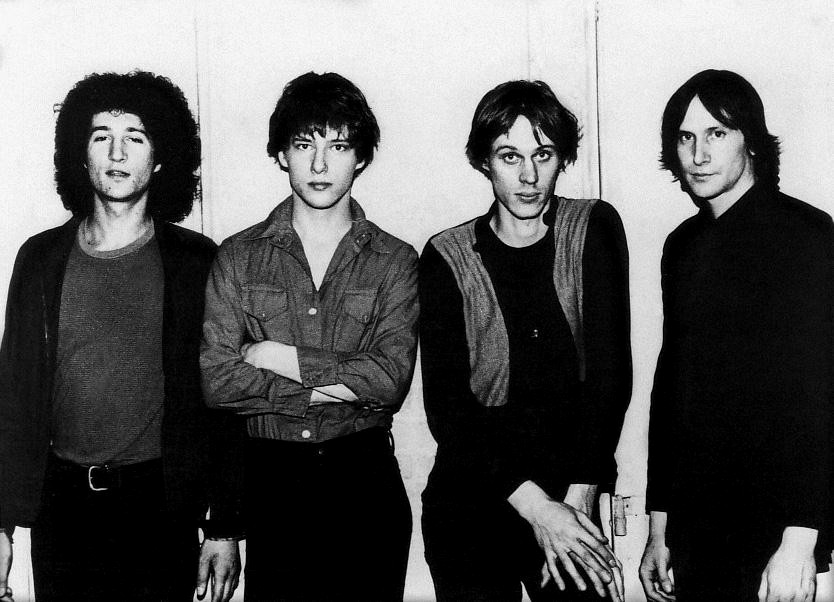
- Television in 1977. Left to right: Billy Ficca, Richard Lloyd, Tom Verlaine, Fred Smith

Background information
- Origin: New York City, New York, U.S.
- Genres: Art punk; punk rock; new wave; art rock; proto-punk
- Years active: 1973–1978; 1991–1993; 2001–2023
- Labels: ORK; Elektra; Capitol; ROIR
- Past members: Billy Ficca; Richard Hell; Tom Verlaine; Richard Lloyd; Fred Smith; Jimmy Rip
- Website: Official Television

Television was an American rock band formed in New York City in 1973. Its most prominent lineup comprised vocalist and guitarist-keyboardist Tom Verlaine, guitarist Richard Lloyd, drummer Billy Ficca, and bassist Fred Smith, who replaced co-founder Richard Hell in 1975. An early fixture of CBGB and the 1970s New York punk rock scene, the band is considered influential in the development of punk rock, post-punk and alternative rock.

Although they recorded in a stripped-down, guitar-based manner similar to their punk contemporaries, Television's music was, by comparison, clean, improvisational and technically proficient, drawing on jazz and 1960s rock and built around the interlocking guitar work of Verlaine and Lloyd. The group's debut album, Marquee Moon (1977), was widely acclaimed and is considered one of the defining releases of the punk era; it reached number 28 in the United Kingdom but sold poorly in the United States. The softer Adventure (1978) reached number 7 in the UK but was received more modestly, and the band split up that year amid creative disagreements and commercial disappointment.

Television reunited in the early 1990s and released a self-titled album in 1992, then disbanded again in 1993. A second reunion began in 2001; Lloyd left in 2007 and was replaced by Jimmy Rip, and the band toured sporadically until 2019. A fourth album that began recording in 2007 was not completed or released. Verlaine died in 2023, and the band disbanded following his death. Smith died in February 2026 and Lloyd in November 2026.

Marquee Moon regularly appears on lists of the greatest rock albums, and the band's guitar work influenced later musicians including R.E.M., U2, Echo & the Bunnymen, Sonic Youth and the Pixies.

== History ==
=== Early history and formation ===
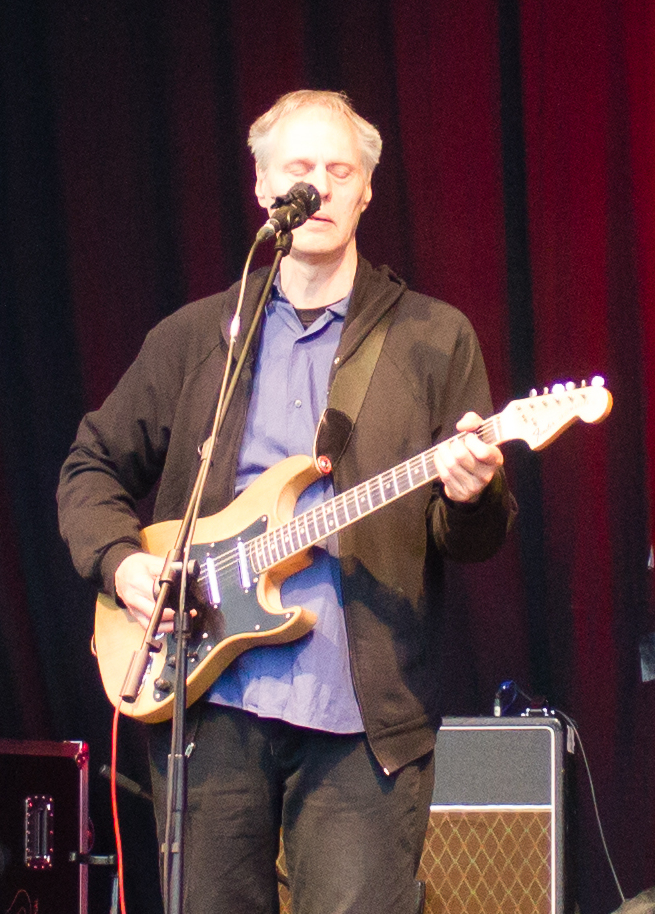
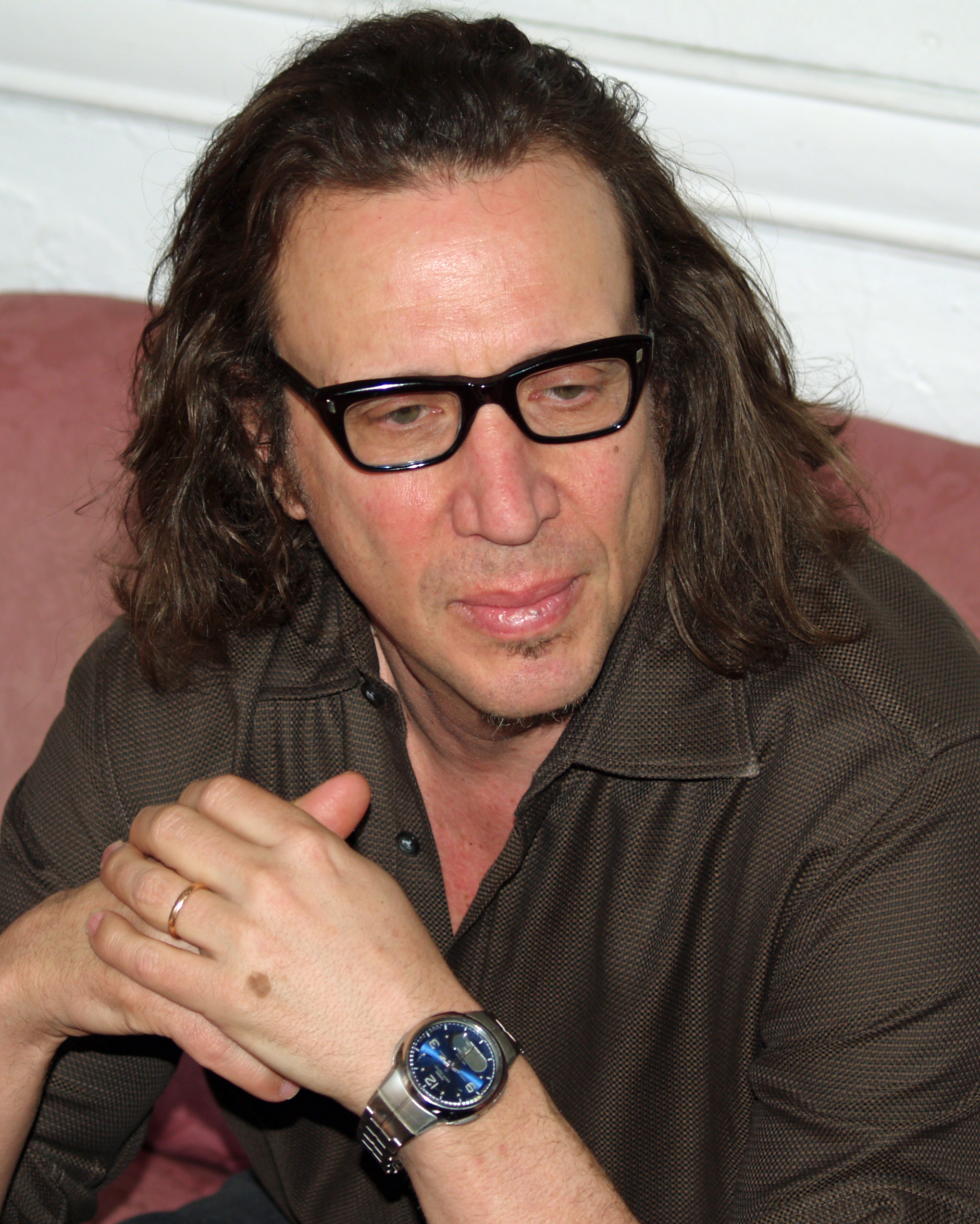
Founding members Tom Verlaine and Richard Hell

Television's roots trace back to the teenage friendship between Tom Verlaine and Richard Hell. The two met at Sanford School in Hockessin, Delaware, from which they ran away. Both moved to New York, separately, in the early 1970s, aspiring to be poets. Born Thomas Miller and Richard Meyers, they adopted the names Verlaine, in tribute to the French poet Paul Verlaine, and Hell. They published poetry together under the pseudonym "Theresa Stern".

Their first group together was the Neon Boys, consisting of Verlaine on guitar and vocals, Hell on bass and vocals, and Billy Ficca on drums. The band formed in 1972, inspired by the New York Dolls. Seeking a second guitarist, they advertised in The Village Voice and auditioned several candidates, including Dee Dee Ramone and Chris Stein, without finding a fit. The group lasted from late 1972 to March 11, 1973. A 7-inch record featuring "That's All I Know (Right Now)" and "Love Comes in Spurts" was released in 1980.

On March 12, 1973, the group reformed, calling themselves Television and recruiting Richard Lloyd as a second guitarist. Lloyd, who had come to New York from Pittsburgh, was recommended by Terry Ork, who managed the bookshop where Hell and Verlaine worked and had given Lloyd a place to stay. The name, devised by Hell, was a pun on 'tell a vision' as well as a reference to reclaiming the dominant media of the era. Their first gig was at the Townhouse Theatre, on March 2, 1974. Their manager, Ork, persuaded CBGB owner Hilly Kristal to give the band a regular Sunday-night gig at his club, where they reportedly constructed their first stage. After playing several gigs at CBGB in early 1974, they played at Max's Kansas City and other clubs before returning to CBGB in January 1975, where they established a significant cult following. Early admirers included Patti Smith, who praised Verlaine's guitar playing in a 1974 review for Rock Scene, and David Bowie, who described the band as the most original he had seen in New York.

The band had received interest from labels by late 1974, but chose to wait for an appropriate record deal. They turned down a number of major labels, including Island Records, for whom they had recorded demos with producer Brian Eno. Eno produced demos of "Prove It", "Friction", "Venus", and "Marquee Moon" in December 1974, but Verlaine considered Eno's production "cold and brittle, no resonance. We're oriented towards really strong guitar music ... sort of expressionistic."

=== Departure of Richard Hell and debut release ===
Initially, songwriting was split almost equally between Hell and Verlaine, with occasional contributions from Lloyd. However, friction began to develop as Verlaine, Lloyd, and Ficca became increasingly musically confident and adept, while Hell remained defiantly untrained in his approach. Verlaine, feeling that Hell's frenzied onstage demeanor was upstaging his songs, reportedly told him to "stop moving" onstage and occasionally refused to play Hell's songs, such as "Blank Generation", in concert. The Eno demos, which consisted largely of Verlaine's songs, reflected Hell's diminishing role. This conflict, as well as one of their songs being picked up by Island Records, led Hell to leave the group and take some of his songs with him. He co-founded the Heartbreakers in 1975 with Johnny Thunders and Jerry Nolan of the New York Dolls, later forming Richard Hell and the Voidoids. Fred Smith, briefly of Blondie, replaced Hell in Television. According to Lloyd, Verlaine invited Smith to leave Blondie, and Smith's steadier playing gave the band a firmer rhythmic foundation.

In 1975, Television shared a residency at CBGB with Patti Smith, who recommended the band to Arista Records president Clive Davis. Although he had seen them perform, Davis was hesitant to sign them at first. He was persuaded by Smith's then-boyfriend Allen Lanier to let them record demos, which Verlaine said resulted in "a much warmer sound than Eno got." However, Verlaine still wanted to find a label that would allow him to produce Television's debut album himself, even though he had little recording experience.

Television made their vinyl debut in 1975 with "Little Johnny Jewel" (Parts One and Two), a 7-inch single on the independent label Ork Records, owned by their manager, Terry Ork. Lloyd apparently disagreed with the song choice, preferring "O Mi Amore" for their debut, to the point that he seriously considered leaving the band. Former Pere Ubu guitarist Peter Laughner reportedly auditioned for his spot during this time. The single became an underground hit that drew the attention of major labels. In 1976, the band appeared in The Blank Generation, a documentary on the CBGB scene directed by Amos Poe and Ivan Kral that also featured Patti Smith, Blondie, the Ramones and Talking Heads.

=== Marquee Moon (1976–77) ===
In August 1976, Television signed with Elektra Records, having declined other offers; Lloyd said that the band had also auditioned for Atlantic Records, where Ahmet Ertegun told them their music was not "Earth music". Elektra promised Verlaine that he could produce the album if he worked with a well-known engineer. The band chose Andy Johns, whose work on the Rolling Stones' Goats Head Soup had impressed Verlaine and whose guitar sounds Lloyd admired, and Elektra did not question the studio budget.

In preparation, the band rehearsed four to six hours a day, six or seven days a week, and discarded most of the material it had written over the previous three years. The album combined two newly written songs, "Guiding Light" and "Torn Curtain", with older material such as "Friction", "Venus" and the title track. Recording began in November 1976 at A & R Recording in Manhattan and took about six weeks. Johns recorded most of the album with the band playing live in the studio. A few songs were captured in a single take; Ficca assumed that the title track was a rehearsal, and Verlaine rejected Johns's suggestion to record it again. Verlaine's guitar was recorded on the left channel and Lloyd's on the right, and the recordings were left without added effects or compression. Lloyd recalled that Verlaine made Johns dismantle a large, John Bonham–style drum sound he had prepared before the first session, and that he persuaded the others to let him double some guitar parts, including the chiming figures on "Venus" and his solo on "Elevation".

Verlaine and Lloyd set aside contemporary punk rock's power chords for melodic lines and counter-melodies drawn from 1960s rock and avant-garde jazz, and Lloyd likened their trading of rhythmic and melodic parts to a jigsaw puzzle. The front cover photograph was taken by Robert Mapplethorpe, who had photographed Patti Smith's Horses (1975); Lloyd had color photocopies made of the band's favorite shot, and the group preferred an unevenly colored copy to Mapplethorpe's original.

Marquee Moon was released on February 8, 1977. In the United Kingdom it reached number 28 on the albums chart, helped by enthusiastic press coverage, including a two-page review by Nick Kent in NME, and both the title track and "Prove It" reached the UK top 30 as singles.

Critics were largely enthusiastic. Roy Trakin wrote in the SoHo Weekly: "forget everything you've heard about Television, forget punk, forget New York, forget CBGB's ... hell, forget rock and roll—this is the real item." Vivien Goldman of Sounds called it an instant classic, and Robert Christgau gave it an A+ in The Village Voice, writing that either Verlaine's lyrics or his guitar playing could have sustained the record alone. Ken Tucker, reviewing it in Rolling Stone alongside albums by Blondie and the Ramones, called it the most interesting and audacious of the three and the most unsettling; he dismissed many of the lyrics as non sequiturs but considered the title track "a small masterpiece". Others were less convinced: Noel Coppage of Stereo Review criticized the singing and songwriting, and Nigel Hunter of Gramophone found the lyrics and guitar playing vague. Stephen Thomas Erlewine of AllMusic writes that the album was "revolutionary" and composed "entirely of tense garage rockers that spiral into heady intellectual territory, which is achieved through the group's long, interweaving instrumental sections." In the Village Voice Pazz & Jop critics' poll for 1977, Marquee Moon finished third, behind the Sex Pistols' Never Mind the Bollocks and Elvis Costello's My Aim Is True, and Christgau ranked it first on his own list.

While holidaying in London after the sessions, Verlaine saw the band on the cover of NME, and Elektra's press department encouraged a British tour. The label had already booked Television as the opening act on Peter Gabriel's American tour; the band played small theaters and larger clubs, found the tour unnerving, and were poorly received by Gabriel's audiences. In May 1977 the band toured British theaters, with Blondie as the opening act, to an enthusiastic response. Verlaine said that it was refreshing to play large theaters after four years in small clubs, but he felt that Blondie did not suit the shows, and Chris Stein later said that Television were competitive and unaccommodating on the tour. By the time the band returned to the United States, Elektra had given up on promoting the album, which sold fewer than 80,000 copies and did not enter the Billboard 200.

=== Adventure and break-up (1977–78) ===
Television recorded their second album, Adventure, in the autumn of 1977. Lloyd recalled that, unlike Marquee Moon, the album was made without a rehearsed body of songs: only "Foxhole" and "Careful" came from the band's live repertoire, and Verlaine declined to record other songs the group had played, such as "Kingdom Come" and "Double Exposure". The album's sound was credited to producer John Jansen rather than Johns.

Adventure was released in April 1978 and reached number 7 on the UK Albums Chart, but it did not chart in the United States. Softer and more reflective than their debut album, it was well received by critics despite modest sales. Ken Emerson of Rolling Stone found it dreamier and more benign than Marquee Moon, likening songs such as "Careful" and "Days" to the Turtles and the Byrds; he was disappointed by its lack of tension and by the duller production, but praised Verlaine's guitar playing and described the band as being in a state of transition. Christgau gave it an A−, calling it less urgent than Marquee Moon but still a very good album. The band continued to perform that summer: Christgau reviewed a June 1978 concert at New York's Bottom Line, and a show at San Francisco's Old Waldorf on June 29 was later released as the live album Live at the Old Waldorf.

Diverging artistic visions, a lack of commercial success, and Lloyd's drug abuse led to the band's breakup in July 1978. Lloyd recalled that Verlaine dominated the second album's sessions and that the group split within three months of its release. Lloyd later said that he was relieved to be free of Verlaine's control. Lloyd and Verlaine pursued solo careers, while Ficca joined the Waitresses. Verlaine released his first solo album in 1979.

=== First reunion and Television (1990–93) ===
Television reformed in the early 1990s and performed live sporadically thereafter. The reunion followed more than a decade of solo work: Verlaine and Lloyd each released solo albums in 1979, and Smith played on every Verlaine solo album. Lloyd struggled with drug and alcohol problems before returning to recording, and he later worked with Matthew Sweet and John Doe. Lloyd and Verlaine had both said in the years after the split that they could not work together again, but Lloyd later said that his remarks were meant to stop people urging a reunion; a late-1980s effort by his manager to reunite the band came to nothing. Lloyd said that he and Verlaine first discussed reuniting around 1989 and resumed talks in October 1990, and that with Smith and Ficca they began jamming seriously that December. The jams were recorded, and Smith said that much of the new album's material grew out of them. The reunion began publicly with a performance at the 1992 Glastonbury Festival.

A Los Angeles lawyer, Fred Davis, solicited interest from record companies, and the band signed with Capitol Records. The band entered Sorcerer Sound in New York in early 1992 to record a new album. Their self-titled third album was released on September 28, 1992.

Capitol allowed Television to produce the album themselves, with Verlaine and Smith credited as executive producers, and the sessions were engineered by Mario Salvati, who had worked on Verlaine's solo albums since 1984. Verlaine said that he had seriously considered releasing the album under a different name, but Capitol would not agree. The songs were credited to Verlaine and the music to the band. The single "Call Mr. Lee" reached number 27 on Billboard's Modern Rock Tracks chart, the band's first appearance on a Billboard chart.

Ira Robbins of Trouser Press called the album a fascinating advance on the band's earlier work that was neither nostalgic nor pointedly modern, Christgau gave it a B+, and Milo Miles of The New York Times described a scaled-down Television with exquisite design details. In interviews to promote it, the members were reluctant to discuss the band's past, and Verlaine dismissed the mythology surrounding CBGB. The band toured extensively, including its largest American tour, but the reunion ended in early 1993. Lloyd later said that it had not been planned as a short-lived project and that it came to a halt as the record company fell apart; he denied rumors of feuding between the guitarists on the 1993 tour. An outtake from the sessions, "The Revolution", appeared on the 1996 Verlaine compilation The Miller's Tale.

=== Second reunion (2001–07) ===
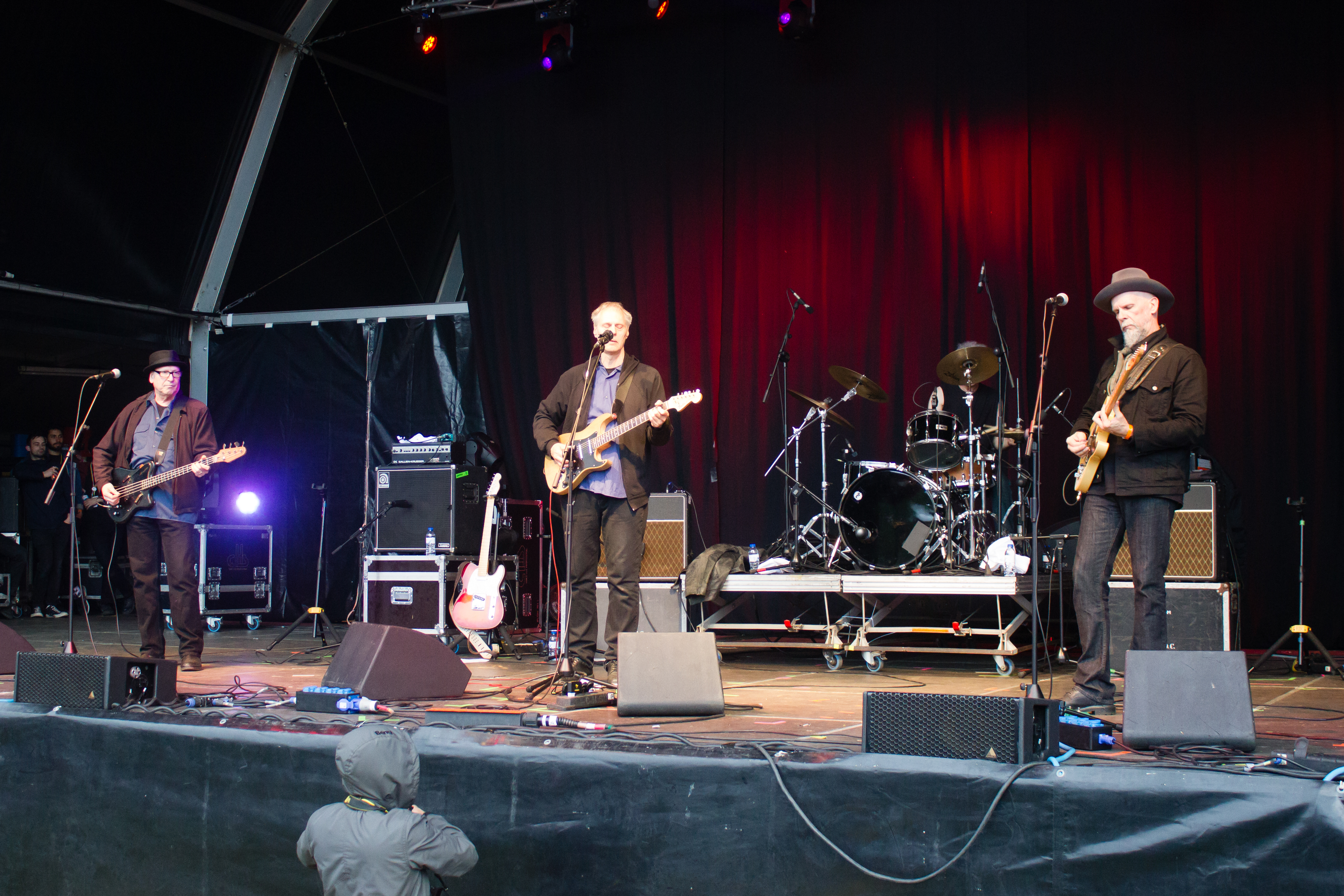
Television performing in 2014

After being wooed back on stage together for the 2001 All Tomorrow's Parties festival at Camber Sands, England, they played several dates around the world on an irregular basis. Lloyd said that the invitation came through Yo La Tengo, friends of the band who were associated with the festival. This time the reunion lasted: in 2003, Lloyd said that the band had been playing together for about two years, picking its dates rather than mounting a long tour, and was mixing new songs into its sets. In 2003, Rhino Records reissued Marquee Moon and Adventure in expanded editions with bonus tracks, along with a live album, Live at the Old Waldorf, on its Rhino Handmade imprint.

=== Later years (2007–22) ===
Guitarist Jimmy Rip joined the band in 2007.

In 2007, Lloyd announced he would be amicably leaving the band after a midsummer show in New York City's Central Park. Due to illness, he was unable to make the Central Park concert. Jimmy Rip substituted for him that day and was subsequently asked to join the band full-time in Lloyd's place. Rip had previously played on Verlaine's solo albums. In late December 2007, the new lineup recorded 14 instrumental tracks at a studio in Manhattan's Chelsea neighborhood, intended as a fourth album, but Verlaine never added the planned vocals and guitar overdubs. On July 7, 2011, the new lineup performed at the Beco 203 club in São Paulo, Brazil. In an MTV Brazil interview, the band stated that an album with about ten new tracks was close to being finished. In a 2013 interview, Verlaine said that the band averaged about one new song every eighteen months and had around a dozen tracks recorded for a possible release, and Ficca said that the album might be completed "before we all die".

In the 2010s, the band kept on touring, performing Marquee Moon in its entirety. In November 2013 the band toured the United Kingdom and Ireland and headlined the first weekend of the final holiday-camp edition of All Tomorrow's Parties at Camber Sands, performing Marquee Moon in full. In New York in October 2015, the band performed a four-song show that lasted an hour; a Village Voice critic highlighted a new song entitled "Persia" as "a pulsing, rhythmic exploration lasting close to 20 minutes, to which each member of the band contributed in equal strength". Other dates that year included Sled Island festival in Calgary, Green Man festival in Wales and Azkena Rock Festival in Spain. The band toured sporadically until 2019. In May 2022, Television was announced as the opening act, replacing the Go-Go's, on Billy Idol's UK arena tour that October, with a plan to perform Marquee Moon in full. The band withdrew in early October, citing illness, and Killing Joke took their place.

=== Death of Verlaine and aftermath (2023–26) ===
Verlaine died in Manhattan on January 28, 2023, at the age of 73; his death was announced by Jesse Paris Smith, the daughter of Patti Smith, who said that he died after a brief illness. Lloyd said that he and Verlaine had reconciled before Verlaine's death, recalling that they were laughing the last time they were together. In 2025, David Fricke was given an exclusive listen to the unreleased fourth album, whose 14 tracks remained instrumental. Television disbanded following Verlaine's death. Rip said that Verlaine had worked on overdubs with him in 2008 but erased them the next day, and Smith recalled that Verlaine hoped "Persia", a song the band performed live but never recorded in the studio, would become his next Marquee Moon. In January 2026, the New York Public Library for the Performing Arts announced that it had acquired Verlaine's archive, which includes lyric drafts, notebooks, correspondence and hundreds of hours of unreleased recordings. Bassist Fred Smith died of cancer on February 5, 2026 at age 77. In June 2026, about 4,000 records from Verlaine's personal collection were put on sale through Discogs and the New York shop Academy Records. Lloyd, who had been diagnosed with bile duct cancer in March 2026, died at his home in Chattanooga, Tennessee, on November 7, 2026, at the age of 75.

== Artistry ==
=== Musical style ===
Television was regarded at the time as an art punk band, and critics have also classified its music as punk rock, new wave, art rock, and proto-punk. Robert Christgau, by contrast, regarded Marquee Moon as a rock record rather than a punk one, because of the band's technical abilities: "It wasn't punk."

The band broke from standard rock convention by omitting blues influence and instead incorporating elements of jazz, while retaining the "raw energy" that was influenced by garage rock. Lloyd nonetheless described the band's sound as "blues from another planet". According to Stephen Thomas Erlewine of AllMusic, "With its angular rhythms and fluid leads, Television's music always went in unconventional directions." Onstage, the band stretched songs into long improvisations, which led detractors to call it the "Grateful Dead of punk". Verlaine, however, said that he had always thought of Television as a pop band.

=== Influences ===
The band's style reflected its members' differing tastes: Smith and Lloyd had a rock and roll background, Ficca was a jazz enthusiast, and Verlaine's tastes ranged from the 13th Floor Elevators to the saxophonist Albert Ayler. Verlaine took piano lessons as a child and played saxophone, and he found rock and roll comparatively unexciting until he heard the Rolling Stones, the Yardbirds, the Kinks and the Byrds, in whom he found the intensity he admired in jazz. He said that he was drawn first to classical melody and then, in his early teens, to John Coltrane, Ayler and Eric Dolphy, and that the Rolling Stones' "19th Nervous Breakdown" was the first rock song to grab him the way a Coltrane record did. Lloyd also cited the Rolling Stones, along with blues musicians such as Little Walter and Sonny Terry and Brownie McGhee, and he said that he learned techniques such as double stops, bends and octaves from Velvert Turner, who had been taught by Jimi Hendrix.

As with many emerging punk bands, the Velvet Underground was a strong influence. Television's ties to punk were underscored by its late-1960s garage rock leanings: the band often covered the Count Five's "Psychotic Reaction" and the 13th Floor Elevators' "Fire Engine" in concert, and its live repertoire also included the Rolling Stones' "(I Can't Get No) Satisfaction" and Bob Dylan's "Knockin' on Heaven's Door". Verlaine said that his tendency to keep playing "until something happened" came from jazz, the Doors and the Yardbirds' Five Live Yardbirds, citing their "rave-up dynamics". The band also drew inspiration from minimalist composers such as Steve Reich. Writers have also named the twin-guitar bands Love, Buffalo Springfield and Quicksilver Messenger Service among the influences on Verlaine and Lloyd's interplay. Lester Bangs heard the influence of Quicksilver in Television's music, noting a similarity between Verlaine's guitar playing and that of John Cipollina, and Verlaine's quivering vibrato has been compared to Cipollina's by later writers. Verlaine downplayed the comparison, citing the Ventures as a more apt reference point.

=== Guitar interplay and instrumentation ===
Though Verlaine and Lloyd were nominally "rhythm" and "lead" guitarists respectively, they often performed interlocking parts with no clear rhythm or lead player. Lloyd described their partnership as almost telepathic. Al Handa writes that Lloyd more often shaped the tonality of the music, while Verlaine and the rhythm section provided its anchor, and that Lloyd's playing contains "truly off the wall ideas". Matt LeMay of Pitchfork noted that, like the Velvet Underground before them, Television's songs focus on interplay and exploration rather than individual melodies and chord progressions.

Lloyd played Hendrix-inspired solos on a 1961 Fender Stratocaster, while Verlaine played slower, blues-inflected leads, shaping them with the tremolo arm of his 1958 Fender Jazzmaster. According to Lloyd, the ornate figures on Marquee Moon were his, while Verlaine built speed and harmonic interest more gradually. Lloyd had learned to notate his solos by the time of Marquee Moon, and the music writer Greg Kot argued that the band created a new template for guitar rock by weaving Verlaine's improvisation together with Lloyd's precisely notated solos. Tony Fletcher argued that the lack of compression, groove, and added effects on the album provided a blueprint for a chromatic rather than rhythmic style of music later described as "angular". Lenny Kaye of the Patti Smith Group said that Verlaine could move from chaotic free-jazz soundscapes to delicate filigree without covering it with distortion. Verlaine's and Lloyd's use of Fender offset guitars influenced later players: Verlaine's Jazzmaster and Jaguar reportedly inspired Thurston Moore, Kevin Shields and John Frusciante to use them, and Sonic Youth followed his lead in seeking out such instruments. Verlaine was also credited with keyboards on Marquee Moon. Hunter Felt of PopMatters attributed the album's influence on post-punk and new wave bands to the precisely syncopated rhythm section of Smith and Ficca.

=== Lyrics and vocals ===
Verlaine's lyrics, influenced by French poetry, combine urban and pastoral imagery and frequently refer to the geography of Lower Manhattan. He used puns and double entendres to give the songs an impressionistic quality, aiming to convey the experience of perception rather than its specific details. Tom Moon observed that Verlaine's singing avoids the "cursory punk snarl" of his contemporaries, while Ira Robbins of Trouser Press found his vocals abrasive and Felt heard in them a "jaded yet somehow impassioned cynicism".

== Legacy ==
Television released only two albums in the 1970s and had limited commercial success, particularly in the United States, but Marquee Moon has since appeared regularly on lists of the greatest rock albums, including the 2020 Rolling Stone ranking of the 500 greatest albums, where it placed 107th. AllMusic's Stephen Thomas Erlewine credited the band with creating an "influential new guitar vocabulary" and wrote that its music laid the groundwork for many of the guitar-based post-punk pop groups of the late 1970s and 1980s. Spin ranked Tom Verlaine and Richard Lloyd seventh on its 2012 list of the 100 greatest guitarists, Mojo placed Verlaine 34th on a similar list, and Rolling Stone ranked him 90th on its own. The band is considered influential in the development of punk rock and alternative rock.

=== Influence on other musicians ===
Later guitarists have often cited Verlaine and Lloyd's interlocking guitar parts. Robert Palmer wrote in The New York Times in 1987 that Verlaine had become the guitarist ambitious young rock musicians were most likely to name. The Edge of U2 said that Television showed him how distinctive the guitar could sound when approached inventively, and Johnny Marr has said that many guitarists of his generation took note of the pair. Thurston Moore of Sonic Youth described their interplay as informative to him, and Guitar World wrote that Sonic Youth followed Verlaine's example in seeking out inexpensive Fender offset guitars. Steve Wynn of The Dream Syndicate said that he spent 1981 practicing daily to Marquee Moon and tried to channel Verlaine's Jazzmaster on the solo of "Halloween", Nels Cline of Wilco named the title track as one of five riffs that changed his life, and Dean Wareham of Galaxie 500 and Luna called Verlaine his favorite guitarist. Flea of the Red Hot Chili Peppers said that Verlaine affected the way he and John Frusciante play.

Michael Stipe of R.E.M. said that Verlaine introduced him to a world that turned his life upside down, and critics have heard Television in R.E.M.'s oblique lyrics and, in the case of "Days" from Adventure, in the band's early music. The Los Angeles Times also heard the bridge of "Marquee Moon" as anticipating much of Sonic Youth's work. Joey Santiago of the Pixies included Marquee Moon among the 13 albums that shaped him, and said that Verlaine and Lloyd's trading of rhythm and lead parts "probably seeped into his playing" with Black Francis on "Monkey Gone to Heaven" through "osmosis rather than design". Alexis Petridis of The Guardian wrote that the bright sound of Marquee Moon hung over much 1980s indie rock, noting that Felt took their name from the way Verlaine sang a word in "Venus" and that The Family Cat named their debut single "Tom Verlaine". Will Sergeant of Echo & the Bunnymen said that Verlaine and Lloyd's guitar playing was a major influence on his band, and Stephen Morris of Joy Division has named Marquee Moon as a favorite album. The Scottish band the Pastels said that almost every guitarist who had played in the group loved Verlaine's playing. Robert Forster of the Go-Betweens called "Venus" his "most perfect song" and described the group as one of many formed in Television's wake.

In 2003, Billboard called Marquee Moon "a holy grail of independent rock" and named Pavement, Sonic Youth, The Strokes and Jeff Buckley among the artists it had clearly influenced. Consequence likewise grouped Pavement, Sonic Youth and Built to Spill among the 1990s guitar bands it influenced. After Verlaine's death, Rolling Stone wrote that his guitar had inspired bands including R.E.M., U2, Wilco, Pavement and Sonic Youth, while noting that none of them closely resembled Television. Pavement turned their song "Folk Jam" into a medley with "Marquee Moon" on their 2022 reunion shows, and Wilco performed "Marquee Moon" at their 2013 Solid Sound Festival, with Jeff Tweedy playing "Venus" after Verlaine's death and calling it the "perfect song".

Petridis described the Strokes and Interpol as part of a later wave of bands that were audibly indebted to Television. Real Estate said that the band would not sound as it does without Verlaine, Peter Bjorn and John called Television a major and constant reference point, and Alvvays titled a song "Tom Verlaine" on their 2022 album Blue Rev. Rolling Stone also heard Verlaine's influence in Yo La Tengo, Horsegirl and Parquet Courts.

== Members ==
- Tom Verlaine – lead vocals, guitar, keyboards (1973–1978, 1991–1993, 2001–2023; his death)
- Billy Ficca – drums (1973–1978, 1991–1993, 2001–2023)
- Richard Lloyd – guitar, backing vocals (1973–1978, 1991–1993, 2001–2007); died 2026
- Richard Hell – lead vocals, bass (1973–1975)
- Fred Smith – bass, backing vocals (1975–1978, 1991–1993, 2001–2023); guitar (1991–1993); died 2026
- Jimmy Rip – guitar (2007–2023)

Timeline

== Discography ==
Studio albums

- Marquee Moon (1977)
- Adventure (1978)
- Television (1992)

Singles and EPs

- "Little Johnny Jewel (Part One)" b/w "Little Johnny Jewel (Part Two)" – Ork Records (1975)
- "Marquee Moon" – Elektra Records (1977)
- "Prove It" b/w "Venus" – Elektra Records (1977)
- "Venus" b/w "Friction" – Elektra Records (1977/Japanese release)
- "Foxhole" b/w "Careful" – Elektra Records (1978)
- "Glory" b/w "Carried Away" – Elektra Records (1978)
- "Ain't That Nothin'" b/w "Glory" – Elektra Records (1978)
- "The Revolution" – Capitol Records, EMI (1992/French release)
- "Call Mr Lee" – Capitol Records (1992)
- "In World" – Capitol Records (1992)

Live albums

- The Blow-Up (1982)
- Live at the Academy, 1992 (2003)
- Live at the Old Waldorf (2003)

Compilation albums

- The Best of Television & Tom Verlaine (1998)

== Filmography ==
- The Blank Generation (1976)
