= Fred Smith (bassist) =

American bass guitarist (1948–2026)

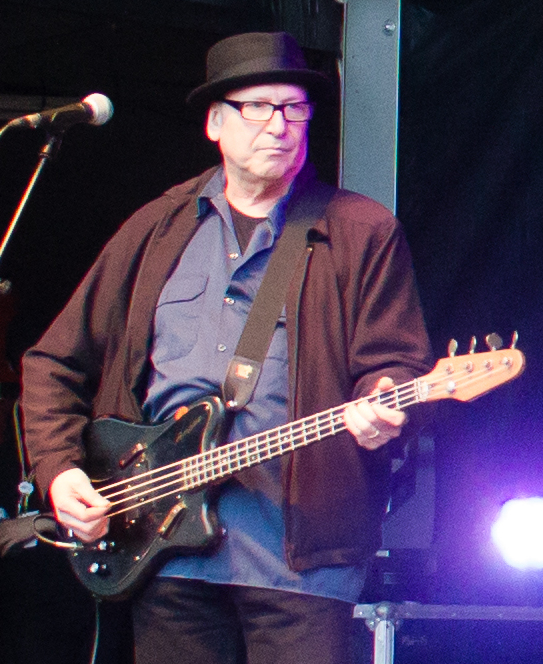
- Smith in 2014

Background information
- Born: Fredrick Edward Lefkowitz; April 10, 1948; New York City, U.S.
- Died: February 5, 2026 (aged 77) New York City, U.S.
- Genres: Punk rock; new wave
- Occupation: Bassist
- Formerly of: Blondie; Television
- Spouse: Paula Cereghino

Fredrick Edward Lefkowitz (April 10, 1948 – February 5, 2026), known professionally as Fred Smith, was an American bass guitarist, best known for his work with the rock band Television.

== Personal life ==
In 1999, he and his wife, artist Paula Cereghino, started making wine in their apartment on Houston Street in New York City's East Village. In 2003, they shifted production to Bloomington, New York, and in 2007 formally established their artisanal winery, Cereghino Smith.

Smith died of cancer at a hospital in Manhattan, New York, on February 5, 2026, at the age of 77.

== Career ==
Smith was the original bassist with Angel and the Snake, which changed names to Blondie and the Banzai Babies, and then Blondie. He quit on March 7, 1975 to replace Richard Hell who had left Television over disputes with Tom Verlaine. Hell went on to form The Heartbreakers with Johnny Thunders and Jerry Nolan of the New York Dolls. At the time, Television played at CBGB along with Blondie. According to Smith, "Blondie was like a boat that was sinking and Television was my favourite band". He stayed with the band until they broke up in 1978 and rejoined them when they reunited in 1992; the band has played off and on ever since. Smith also participated in the solo albums of the Television guitarists Tom Verlaine and Richard Lloyd, and played with such artists as The Roches, Willie Nile, Peregrins, and The Revelons. From 1988 to 1989, he played bass, recorded, and toured with The Fleshtones.
