= Summer Cannibals =

Single by Patti Smith

from the album Gone Again
- Released: August 12, 1996
- Recorded: Electric Lady Studios
- Genre: Rock
- Length: 4:10
- Label: Arista
- Songwriters: Patti Smith, Fred Smith
- Producers: Malcolm Burn, Lenny Kaye

Patti Smith singles chronology
""Up There; Down There"" (1988)	"Summer Cannibals" (1996)	""E-Bow the Letter"" (1996)

Audio sample
- file; help

Second disc cover
- Part 2 of a 2CD set

"Summer Cannibals" is a rock song written by Patti Smith and Fred "Sonic" Smith, and released as a lead single from Patti Smith 1996 album Gone Again. The song derives from a song Fred "Sonic" Smith wrote and played with his pre-Sonic Rendezvous Band, Ascension in September 1973. Ascension included Michael Davis on vocals and John Hefti on bass.

== Music video ==
The music video was produced by Michael H. Shamberg and directed by Robert Frank.

== Track listing ==
=== First release ===
#	Title	Songwriter	Length
1	"Summer Cannibals"	Patti Smith, Fred "Sonic" Smith	4:10
2	"Come Back Little Sheba"	Patti Smith, Lenny Kaye	2:35
3	"Gone Again" (Live)	Patti Smith, Fred Smith	3:38
4	"People Have the Power"	Patti Smith, Fred Smith	r

=== Second release ===
#	Title	Songwriter	Length
1	"Summer Cannibals"	Patti Smith, Fred "Sonic" Smith	4:10
2	"People Have the Power" (Live)	Patti Smith, Fred Smith	2:13
3	"Beneath the Southern Cross"	Patti Smith, Lenny Kaye	4:35
4	"Come on in My Kitchen"	Robert Johnson	4:13

== Release history ==
Region	Date	Label	Format	Catalog
UK	1996	Arista Records	CD, First Release	74321-40168-2
UK	1996	Arista Records	CD, Second Release	74321-40299-2
