= Gung Ho (album) =

Studio album by Patti Smith
- Released: March 21, 2000
- Recorded: Sear Sound, New York City
- Genre: Rock
- Length: 64:31
- Label: Arista
- Producer: Gil Norton

Patti Smith chronology
| Peace and Noise (1997) | Gung Ho (2000) | Trampin' (2004) |

Singles from Gung Ho
- 1. "Glitter in Their Eyes" Released: 2000; 2. "Lo and Beholden" Released: 2000

Gung Ho is the eighth studio album by Patti Smith, released March 21, 2000 on Arista Records.

== Release ==
Gung Ho was released on March 21, 2000, by Arista Records. The title refers to a Chinese phrase meaning "work together" adopted by the US Marines during World War II as a morale-building slogan. It is the first Patti Smith album to not include her on the cover (it shows, instead, a picture of her father, Grant Smith).

The song "New Party" was used as the official song for the 2000 Ralph Nader's presidential campaign.

Smith wrote the song "Grateful" in tribute to Jerry Garcia on August 9, 1995, the day of his death.

As of February 2004, Gung Ho had sold 49,000 copies in the United States according to Nielsen Soundscan.

== Critical reception ==
Professional ratings
Aggregate scores
| Source | Rating |
|---|---|
| Metacritic | 73/100 |
Review scores
| Source | Rating |
| AllMusic | 3/5 stars |
| Entertainment Weekly | A |
| The Guardian | 3/5 stars |
| Los Angeles Times | 3/4 stars |
| Mojo | 4/5 stars |
| NME | 6/10 |
| Pitchfork | 4.6/10 |
| Rolling Stone | 4.5/5 stars |
| Spin | 4/10 |
| USA Today | 3.5/4 stars |

Gung Ho was met with "generally favorable" reviews from critics. At Metacritic, which assigns a weighted average rating out of 100 to reviews from mainstream publications, this release received an average score of 73, based on 16 reviews.

Gung Ho was included in Rolling Stone's "Top 50 Albums of 2000".

The song "Glitter in Their Eyes" was nominated for a Grammy Award for Best Female Rock Vocal Performance in 2001.

== Track listing ==
| No. | Title | Writer(s) | Length |
|---|---|---|---|
| 1. | "One Voice" | Patti Smith, Jay Dee Daugherty | 4:46 |
| 2. | "Lo and Beholden" | Lenny Kaye, Patti Smith | 4:45 |
| 3. | "Boy Cried Wolf" | Patti Smith | 4:54 |
| 4. | "Persuasion" | Patti Smith, Fred "Sonic" Smith | 4:36 |
| 5. | "Gone Pie" | Patti Smith, Tony Shanahan | 4:06 |
| 6. | "China Bird" | Oliver Ray, Patti Smith | 4:08 |
| 7. | "Glitter in Their Eyes" | Ray, Patti Smith | 3:00 |
| 8. | "Strange Messengers" | Kaye, Patti Smith | 8:06 |
| 9. | "Grateful" | Patti Smith | 4:34 |
| 10. | "Upright Come" | Ray, Patti Smith | 3:00 |
| 11. | "New Party" | Patti Smith, Shanahan | 4:33 |
| 12. | "Libbie's Song" | Patti Smith | 3:28 |
| 13. | "Gung Ho" | Daugherty, Kaye, Ray, Patti Smith, Shanahan | 11:45 |

== Personnel ==
Band

- Patti Smith – vocals, guitar, photography
- Lenny Kaye – guitar
- Jay Dee Daugherty – drums
- Oliver Ray – guitar
- Tony Shanahan – bass, keyboards

Additional personnel

- Danton Supple – engineer (Sear Sound recording studio, NYC); mixing (The Church Studios, London and Eden Studios, London)
- Gil Norton – production; mixing (The Church Studios, London and Eden Studios, London)
- Grant Hart – piano, Farfisa, "Persuasion"
- Grant Smith – album cover model, Townsend, Australia, 1942
- Jackson Smith – guitar solo, "Persuasion"
- Jake Davies – computer engineer (Sear Sound recording studio, NYC)
- Mark Phythers – computer engineer (Sear Sound recording studio, NYC)
- Margery Greenspan – art direction
- Michael Stipe – backing vocalist, "Glitter in Their Eyes"
- Paul Angelli – mastering engineer (Sterling Sound, NYC)
- Ben E. Franklin – penny whistle, "Libbie's Song"
- Rebecca Weiner Tompkins – violin, "Libbie's Song"
- Kimberly Smith – mandolin, "Libbie's Song"
- Skaila Kanga – harp, "Lo and Beholden"
- Steven Sebring – band photography
- Ted Jensen – mastering engineer (Sterling Sound, NYC)
- Todd Parker – assistant engineer (Sear Sound recording studio, NYC)
- Tom Verlaine – guitar solo, "Glitter in Their Eyes"
- Wade Raley – backing vocalist, "Glitter in Their Eyes"

== Charts ==
| Chart (2000) | Peak position |
|---|---|
| Switzerland | 94 |
| U.S. Billboard 200 | 178 |
