= Up There Down There =

Single by Patti Smith

from the album Dream of Life
- Released: 1988
- Recorded: The Hit Factory, 1987
- Genre: Rock
- Length: 4:47
- Label: Arista
- Songwriter(s): Patti Smith, Fred Smith
- Producer(s): Fred Smith, Jimmy Iovine

Patti Smith singles chronology
"Looking for You (I Was)" (1988)	"Up There Down There" (1988)	"Summer Cannibals" (1996)

"Up There Down There" is a rock song written by Patti Smith and Fred "Sonic" Smith. It was released as the third single from Patti Smith's 1988 album Dream of Life.

== Charts ==
Chart (1988)	Position
Hot Modern Rock Tracks	6
