= M Train (book) =

2015 memoir by Patti Smith

- First edition
- Author: Patti Smith
- Audio read by: Patti Smith
- Subject: Memoir
- Publisher: Alfred A. Knopf, Random House Audio
- Publication date: 2015
- Media type: Print / Audio
- Pages: 253
- ISBN: 978-1-101-87510-0 (Hardcover)
- Dewey Decimal: 782.4216092
- LC Class: ML420.S672

M Train is a 2015 memoir written by Patti Smith. Smith's audiobook recording of M Train earned a Grammy Award nomination for Best Spoken Word Album.

== Contents ==
M Train is Smith's second memoir, following the 2010 National Book Award-winning Just Kids. While Just Kids recounts Smith's early life, the beginning of her career and particularly her relationship with artist Robert Mapplethorpe, M Train focuses on a later portion of her life, the period since the release of her debut album Horses in 1975. The memoir particularly recounts the personal losses that marked the forty-year span between Horses and M Train, including the deaths of Mapplethorpe in 1989, of AIDS; Smith's husband, guitarist Fred "Sonic" Smith, in 1994 at 45, of heart failure; and Smith's brother Todd a month later, of a stroke.

The book also discusses the 16 years in this period during which Smith was not performing; instead, living in Detroit with her husband and two children, she spent early mornings writing stories before her family awoke. The title, M Train, referring to this imaginative work, invokes a "mind train" that "goes to any station it wants."

Patti Smith's "M Train" details her unexpected 2007 meeting with Bobby Fischer in Iceland. She told Jeffrey Brown, PBS NewsHour that the reclusive chess legend, a rock 'n' roll fan, sang to her until dawn, performing classics from the Chi-Lites, the Four Tops, and Chuck Berry, despite his "terrible singing." Their shared literary interests led to a friendship that lasted until Fischer's death in 2008.

== Reception ==
M Train received strongly favorable reviews. In The New York Times, book critic Michiko Kakutani called the book "achingly beautiful" with "lyrical and radiantly pictorial" prose. In The Washington Post, novelist Elizabeth Hand described the book as being as "perceptive and beautifully written as its predecessor" Just Kids. In one mild dissent, novelist Charles Finch wrote in the Chicago Tribune that M Train "didn't change my life" but "it's also easy to see why so many readers say that it has," noting it shares Just Kids' "gangly but lovely writing, the same resolute faith in the consolations of art, the same odd flashes of humor, the same rawness to memory and experience...it's obvious why some readers find a deep, deep correspondence to their own inner lives in [Smith's] work."

== Awards ==
M Train was nominated for the Grammy Award for Best Spoken Word Album.
