= Year of the monkey (disambiguation) =

Year of the monkey refers to the ninth year of the Chinese Zodiac.

As a title, it may also mean:

- Year of the Monkey (album), an album by Pushmonkey
- Year of the Monkey (book), a memoir by singer-songwriter Patti Smith
- "Year of the Monkey" (12 Monkeys), a 2016 television episode
