= Glitter in Their Eyes =

2000 single by Patti Smith

Promotional single by Patti Smith

from the album Gung Ho
- Released: 2000
- Studio: Sear Sound, New York City
- Genre: Rock
- Length: 3:00
- Label: Arista
- Songwriter(s): Patti Smith, Oliver Ray
- Producer(s): Gil Norton

"Glitter in Their Eyes" is a rock song written by Patti Smith and Oliver Ray, and released as a promo single from Patti Smith 2000 album Gung Ho. In 2001 the song was nominated for Grammy Award for Best Female Rock Vocal Performance.

Published Liner notes with the Gung Ho CD state the album was recorded at Sear Sound recording studio in New York City, mixed by Gil Norton and Danton Supple at The Church Studios in London, and Mastered by Ted Jensen at Sterling Sound in the Chelsea neighborhood of Manhattan. However, the Glitter in Their Eyes single was mixed at Eden Studios in London, and Mastered by Ted Jensen and Paul Angeli at Sterling Sound in NYC. Additional musicians for the single include: backing vocals of Michael Stipe (of R.E.M.) and Wade Raley; and a guitar solo by Tom Verlaine (frontman for the New York rock band Television).
