= Gone Again =

Studio album by Patti Smith
- Released: June 18, 1996
- Studio: Electric Lady (New York City)
- Genres: Art rock; punk rock
- Length: 55:47
- Label: Arista
- Producers: Malcolm Burn, Lenny Kaye

Patti Smith chronology
| Dream of Life (1988) | Gone Again (1996) | Peace and Noise (1997) |

Singles from Gone Again
- 1. "Summer Cannibals" Released: August 1996; 2. "Gone Again" Released: 1996

Professional ratings
Review scores
| Source | Rating |
|---|---|
| AllMusic | 3.5/5 stars |
| Chicago Tribune | 3.5/4 stars |
| Entertainment Weekly | A− |
| The Guardian | 4/5 stars |
| Los Angeles Times | 3/4 stars |
| NME | 6/10 |
| Q | 4/5 stars |
| Rolling Stone | 4/5 stars |
| Spin | 7/10 |
| USA Today | 4/4 stars |

Gone Again is the sixth studio album by Patti Smith, released June 18, 1996, on Arista Records. The production of the record was preceded by the deaths of many of Smith's close friends and peers, including her husband Fred "Sonic" Smith, her brother Todd, Robert Mapplethorpe, Richard Sohl and Kurt Cobain, with whom Smith had sympathized. In addition to this, Gone Again also features the last studio performance of Jeff Buckley, released before his death less than a year later.

In May 1999 Rolling Stone magazine placed the album on its list of "The Essential Recordings of the '90s".

== Track listing ==
All tracks are written by Patti Smith, unless otherwise noted.

| No. | Title | Writer(s) | Length |
|---|---|---|---|
| 1. | "Gone Again" | Patti Smith, Fred "Sonic" Smith | 3:16 |
| 2. | "Beneath the Southern Cross" | Patti Smith, Lenny Kaye | 4:35 |
| 3. | "About a Boy" | | 8:15 |
| 4. | "My Madrigal" | Patti Smith, Luis Resto | 5:09 |
| 5. | "Summer Cannibals" | Patti Smith, Fred Smith | 4:10 |
| 6. | "Dead to the World" | | 4:17 |
| 7. | "Wing" | | 4:53 |
| 8. | "Ravens" | | 3:56 |
| 9. | "Wicked Messenger" | Bob Dylan | 3:49 |
| 10. | "Fireflies" | Patti Smith, Oliver Ray | 9:33 |
| 11. | "Farewell Reel" | | 3:54 |
| Total length: | | | 55:47 |

== Samples ==
"Summer Cannibals"

== Personnel ==
Band

- Patti Smith – vocals, guitar
- Lenny Kaye – guitar, production
- Luis Resto – keyboards
- Jay Dee Daugherty – drums
- Tony Shanahan – bass

With

- Oliver Ray – guitar on 1, whistle on 6, photography, feedback
- Tom Verlaine – guitar on 5 and 7.

Additional personnel

- Angela Skouras – design
- Annie Leibovitz – photography
- Brian Sperber – guitar, engineer
- Cesar Diaz – guitar on 9.
- Eileen Ivers – fiddle on 1.
- Greg Calbi – mastering
- Hearn Gadbois – percussion on 10.
- Jane Scarpantoni – cello on 4.
- Jeff Buckley – vocals on 2, esraj on 10.
- John Angello – mixing
- John Cale – organ on 2.
- Kimberly Smith – mandolin on 8.
- Malcolm Burn – production, engineering, dulcimer, guitar
- Patrick McCarthy – mixing
- Rick Kiernan – saw on 5.
- Roy Cicala – mixing
- Whit Smith – guitar
- David Voigt – engineering

== Charts ==
Chart performance for Gone Again
| Chart (1996) | Peak position |
|---|---|
| Australian Albums (ARIA) | 81 |
| Austrian Albums (Ö3 Austria) | 21 |
| Belgian Albums (Ultratop Flanders) | 29 |
| Belgian Albums (Ultratop Wallonia) | 45 |
| Dutch Albums (Album Top 100) | 51 |
| French Albums (SNEP) | 46 |
| German Albums (Offizielle Top 100) | 28 |
| Norwegian Albums (VG-lista) | 33 |
| Swedish Albums (Sverigetopplistan) | 18 |
| Swiss Albums (Schweizer Hitparade) | 29 |
| UK Albums (Official Charts) | 44 |
| US Billboard 200 | 55 |

== Release history ==
| Date | Label | Format | Catalog |
|---|---|---|---|
| June 18, 1996 | Arista Records | CD, Cassette | 18747 |
| 2007 | Sony BMG | CD | 37932 |
