= A Useless Death =

Poem by Patti Smith

- Author: Patti Smith
- Cover artist: Patti Smith
- Language: English
- Genre: Poetry
- Publisher: Gotham Book Mart
- Publication date: 1972
- Publication place: United States
- Media type: Chapbook
- Pages: 3

"A Useless Death" is a poem by Patti Smith, published as a chapbook in 1972.

== Plot ==
The poem talks about a person witnessing the execution of a queen.

== See also ==
- Gotham Book Mart
- Chapbook
