= Strange Messenger =

Book by Patti Smith

- Author: Patti Smith
- Language: English
- Genre: Visual arts
- Publisher: Warhol Museum
- Publication date: April 2, 2003
- Publication place: United States
- Media type: Paperback
- Pages: 80
- ISBN: 978-0-9715688-2-2
- OCLC: 52376276
- LC Class: NC139.S568 A4 2002

Strange Messenger is the art exhibition by Patti Smith, published in 2003 as a book.
