= Patti Smith: Dream of Life =

- Directed by: Steven Sebring
- Produced by: Scott Vogel; Steven Sebring; Margaret Smilow
- Starring: Patti Smith
- Narrated by: Patti Smith
- Cinematography: Phillip Hunt; Steven Sebring
- Edited by: Angelo Corrao; Lin Polito
- Music by: Patti Smith
- Distributed by: Celluloid Dreams
- Release date: January 20, 2008
- Running time: 109 minutes
- Country: United States
- Language: English

Patti Smith: Dream of Life is a 2008 documentary film about Patti Smith directed by Steven Sebring. It was presented at Berlin International Film Festival. The movie won the "Excellence in Cinematography Award: Documentary" at the 2008 Sundance Film Festival and aired on the PBS series P.O.V. on December 30, 2009.

A Patti Smith: Dream of Life app for the iPad was published in May 2011.

== Band ==
- Patti Smith – vocals, clarinet
- Lenny Kaye – guitar
- Oliver Ray – guitar
- Tony Shanahan – bass, vocals
- Jay Dee Daugherty – drums
