= Dream of Life =

Studio album by Patti Smith
- Released: June 1988
- Recorded: 1987
- Studios: Hit Factory (New York City); A&M (Los Angeles)
- Genre: Art punk
- Length: 42:01
- Label: Arista
- Producers: Fred Smith, Jimmy Iovine

Patti Smith chronology
Wave (1979)	Dream of Life (1988)	Gone Again (1996)

Singles from Dream of Life
- 1. "People Have the Power" Released: 1988; 2. "Looking for You (I Was)" Released: 1988; 3. "Up There Down There" Released: 1988

Dream of Life is the fifth studio album by Patti Smith, released in June 1988 on Arista Records.

== Recording and release ==
"People Have the Power"

Dream of Life was Smith's first album after the dissolution of the Patti Smith Group, and the only album that she made with her husband Fred "Sonic" Smith. Lead single "People Have the Power" received some album-oriented rock airplay at the time, and later was revived by Michael Stipe as a theme song for the 2004 Vote for Change concerts. "People Have the Power" was performed live for the first time by Patti and Fred Smith at the Arista Records 15th Anniversary Gala at Radio City Music Hall on March 17, 1990. "Paths That Cross" is dedicated to the memory of Samuel J. Wagstaff. The cover photograph is by Robert Mapplethorpe.

== Reception ==
Professional ratings
Review scores
Source	Rating
AllMusic	3.5/5 stars
Chicago Sun-Times	3/4 stars
Chicago Tribune	2.5/4 stars
Los Angeles Times	3.5/4 stars
Mojo	3/5 stars
NME	6/10
The Philadelphia Inquirer	3/4 stars
Rolling Stone	4/5 stars
Spin	3/5 stars
The Village Voice	A−

Dream of Life received generally favorable reviews from critics, who ranked the album number 31 in The Village Voice's 1988 Pazz & Jop critics' poll. It was also ranked number 49 on Sounds magazine's list of the best albums of the year.

== Track listing ==
All songs were written by Patti Smith and Fred "Sonic" Smith.

Side 1
No.	Title	Length
1.	"People Have the Power"	5:07
2.	"Going Under"	5:57
3.	"Up There Down There"	4:47
4.	"Paths That Cross"	4:18

Side 2
No.	Title	Length
5.	"Dream of Life"	4:38
6.	"Where Duty Calls"	7:46
7.	"Looking for You (I Was)"	4:04
8.	"The Jackson Song"	5:24

== CD reissue ==
Side 1 & 2
No.	Title	Length
1.	"People Have the Power"	5:09
2.	"Up There Down There"	4:49
3.	"Paths That Cross"	4:19
4.	"Dream of Life"	4:39
5.	"Where Duty Calls"	7:48
6.	"Going Under"	6:00
7.	"Looking for You (I Was)"	4:06
8.	"The Jackson Song"	5:25
9.	"As the Night Goes By" (bonus track)	5:04
10.	"Wild Leaves" (bonus track)	4:03

== Personnel ==
- Patti Smith – vocals
- Fred "Sonic" Smith – guitar, production
- Jay Dee Daugherty – drums, keyboards, consultant
- Richard Sohl – keyboards

Additional personnel

- Andi Ostrowe – backing vocals
- Bob Glaub – bass on "Going Under"
- Errol "Crusher" Bennett – percussion on "Looking for You (I Was)"
- Gary Rasmussen – bass
- Hearn Gadbois – percussion
- Jesse Levy – cello on "The Jackson Song"
- Kasim Sulton – bass
- Malcolm West – bass on "The Jackson Song"
- Margaret Ross – harp on "The Jackson Song"
- Robin Nash – backing vocals on "Going Under"
- Sammy Figueroa – percussion

Technical

- Scott Litt – associate producer, mixing, assistant producer
- Thom Panunzio, Kevin Killen, Jay Healy, Jim Michewicz, Brian Sperber – engineer
- Robert De La Garza, Roger Talkov, Rob Jacobs, Rich Travali, Marc DeSisto, Dave McNair, Bill Dooley – assistant engineer
- Shelly Yakus – mixing
- Bob Ludwig, Vic Anesini – mastering
- Maude Gilman – design
- Robert Mapplethorpe – photography

== Charts ==
Chart (1988)	Peak position
Austria	26
Netherlands	47
Norway	9
Sweden	15
Switzerland	9
UK Albums Chart	70
U.S. Billboard 200	65
