= Bread of Angels =

2025 memoir by Patti Smith

- Author: Patti Smith
- Publisher: Random House
- Publication date: November 4, 2025
- Pages: 288
- ISBN: 978-1-101-87512-4

Bread of Angels: A Memoir is a 2025 memoir by Patti Smith.

In a Vanity Fair article published ahead of its release, Smith revealed that the cover photo was taken by Robert Mapplethorpe.

The title comes from several fond memories in Patti's early years (p. 85):

This is what the writer craves, in a café in the earliest hours, in an empty drawing room of a hotel, or scrawling in a notebook in the pew of a silent cathedral. A sudden shaft of brightness containing the vibration of a particluar moment. Johnny Stahl tying my bootlace. Butchy Magic's fingers extracting the stinger. The unsullied memory of unpremeditated gestures of kindness. These are the bread of angels.
