= Peace and Noise =

Studio album by Patti Smith
- Released: September 30, 1997
- Studio: IIwII (Weehawken)
- Genre: Art punk
- Length: 52:29
- Label: Arista
- Producer: Patti Smith

Patti Smith chronology
| Gone Again (1996) | Peace and Noise (1997) | Gung Ho (2000) |

Singles from Peace and Noise
- 1. "1959" Released: 1997

Vinyl cover

Peace and Noise is the seventh studio album by Patti Smith, released on September 30, 1997, by Arista Records.

== Critical reception ==
Professional ratings
Review scores
| Source | Rating |
|---|---|
| AllMusic | 3/5 stars |
| Chicago Tribune | 3/4 stars |
| Entertainment Weekly | B+ |
| The Guardian | 3/5 stars |
| Los Angeles Times | 3/4 stars |
| NME | 7/10 |
| Pitchfork | 3.5/10 |
| Rolling Stone | 4/5 stars |
| Spin | 7/10 |
| USA Today | 3.5/4 stars |

Peace and Noise received generally favorable reviews from critics, ranking No. 29 in The Village Voice's 1997 Pazz & Jop poll. Uncut magazine ranked the album 21st in its list of the top 25 albums of 1997.

The single "1959" was nominated for Best Female Rock Vocal Performance at the 40th Annual Grammy Awards.

== Track listing ==
| No. | Title | Writer(s) | Length |
|---|---|---|---|
| 1. | "Waiting Underground" | Patti Smith, Oliver Ray | 5:20 |
| 2. | "Whirl Away" | Smith, Lenny Kaye, Ray | 5:01 |
| 3. | "1959" | Smith, Tony Shanahan | 3:58 |
| 4. | "Spell" | Allen Ginsberg, Ray | 3:17 |
| 5. | "Don't Say Nothing" | Smith, Jay Dee Daugherty | 5:52 |
| 6. | "Dead City" | Smith, Ray | 4:15 |
| 7. | "Blue Poles" | Smith, Ray | 5:19 |
| 8. | "Death Singing" | Smith | 3:44 |
| 9. | "Memento Mori" | Smith, Kaye, Ray, Daugherty, Shanahan | 10:34 |
| 10. | "Last Call" | Smith, Ray | 5:09 |

== Personnel ==
Band

- Patti Smith – vocals; clarinet on "Spell"
- Lenny Kaye – electric and acoustic guitars; bass on "Waiting Underground", pedal steel guitar on "Blue Poles"
- Oliver Ray – electric and acoustic guitars, photography; national duolian on "Last Call"
- Tony Shanahan – bass; piano on "Waiting Underground", drums on "Last Call"
- Jay Dee Daugherty – drums; organ on "Don't Say Nothing", harmonica on "Blue Poles", bass on "Last Call"

Additional personnel

- Mark Burdett – art direction
- Michael Stipe – backing vocals on "Last Call"
- Roy Cicala – engineering, mixing

== Charts ==
| Chart (1997) | Peak position |
|---|---|
| Sweden | 47 |
| UK Albums Chart | 169 |
| U.S. Billboard 200 | 152 |
