= 1959 (Patti Smith song) =

Promotional single by Patti Smith

from the album Peace and Noise
- Released: 1997
- Studio: IIwII, Weehawken, New Jersey
- Genre: Rock
- Length: 3:58
- Label: Arista
- Songwriters: Patti Smith, Tony Shanahan

"1959" is a rock song written by Patti Smith and Tony Shanahan, and released as a promo single from Patti Smith's 1997 album Peace and Noise. At the 40th Annual Grammy Awards the song was nominated for Grammy Award for Best Female Rock Vocal Performance.
