= Just Kids =

2010 book by Patti Smith

- Book cover
- Author: Patti Smith
- Language: English
- Subject: Relationship with Robert Mapplethorpe
- Genre: Memoir
- Publisher: Ecco
- Publication date: January 19, 2010
- Publication place: United States
- Pages: 278
- ISBN: 978-0-06-621131-2
- OCLC: 496864395
- LC Class: 1

Just Kids is a memoir by Patti Smith, published on January 19, 2010, documenting her relationship with artist Robert Mapplethorpe.

"I didn't write it to be cathartic," she noted. "I wrote it because Robert asked me to… Our relationship was such that I knew what he would want and the quality of what he deserved. So that was my agenda for writing that book. I wrote it to fulfill my vow to him, which was on his deathbed. In finishing, I did feel that I'd fulfilled my promise."

== Summary ==
=== Foreword ===
The memoir opens with the passing of Robert Mapplethorpe, Patti Smith’s close friend and former lover. She is asleep when he takes his last breath in the hospital, having bid him goodnight over the phone. As he struggles under heavy sedation, she senses it will be their final conversation.

The next morning, she awakens with a deep intuition of his death. Sitting in her study with a book of Odilon Redon’s artwork, an opera from Tosca plays softly on the TV. Soon after, Mapplethorpe’s younger brother calls to confirm her premonition.

=== Monday’s Children ===
Patti Smith’s childhood begins in South Jersey in the 1950s and early ’60s, growing up in a working-class family with strict Jehovah’s Witness roots. Even as a child, she’s enthralled by books, drawing, and the idea of being an artist. Her influences are Arthur Rimbaud, Bob Dylan, and beat poetry.

In 1966, at the age of 19, she gets pregnant after a brief relationship and gives her baby up for adoption. In July 1967, she boards a bus to New York City with only a suitcase, some art supplies, and a copy of Illuminations by Rimbaud.

She works at a factory, then at Scribner’s bookstore—barely scraping by. Soon after arriving in the city, she meets Robert Mapplethorpe by chance in Brooklyn. They cross paths again weeks later at Brentano’s bookstore, and their relationship begins. They become inseparable. New York is in the middle of social problems—drugs, political unrest, and radical experimentation are everywhere. Smith and Mapplethorpe are focused on becoming artists.

=== Just Kids ===
Living on practically nothing, they move from apartment to apartment, squatting and sometimes stealing to survive. Patti recalls their magical “bohemian fairy tale” life, where they try to make art out of everything—even poverty. In 1968, they move into the smallest room of the Allerton Hotel, and later into a loft on Hall Street, near the Pratt Institute where Robert had studied.

Robert begins to experiment with art more seriously—at first collages, talismans, and religious iconography—and later photography, especially after Patti gifts him a Polaroid SX-70 camera. Meanwhile, Patti explores writing poetry, sketches, and begins performing her work at open mics.

Robert starts to privately explore his sexuality. Though the sexual aspect of their relationship fades, their emotional bond only intensifies. Robert’s inner turmoil is evident: his Catholic guilt, his attraction to men, and his obsession with beauty create tension in his psyche and art. Patti is his muse, but he also begins to explore the erotic male form through photography and relationships with other men.

In 1969, Patti starts working at Scribner’s and watches artists like Andy Warhol and Edie Sedgwick from afar, both fascinated and alienated by their circle. Robert, meanwhile, begins to drift toward Warhol’s Factory, especially after connecting with art collector and curator Sam Wagstaff, who becomes his lover and patron later on.

=== Hotel Chelsea ===
By 1970, Patti and Robert move into Room 1017 of the Hotel Chelsea, along with artists, writers and musicians. They befriend or observe many artistic figures, such as Janis Joplin, Jimi Hendrix, William S. Burroughs, Allen Ginsberg, and Sam Shepard (with whom Patti has a brief romance and collaborates on the play Cowboy Mouth).

Robert’s work begins to shift more toward photography, though he’s still hesitant to fully embrace it as his medium. Patti continues writing and drawing, but increasingly feels called to perform. She starts reading her poetry at St. Mark’s Church and the Poetry Project, immersing herself in the downtown literary and performance scenes.

In 1973, Patti meets guitarist Lenny Kaye, and together they start adding music to her poetry readings. This marks the beginning of what will become the Patti Smith Group. With the help of manager Jane Friedman, she transitions from poet to proto-punk frontwoman.

=== Separate Ways Together ===
By 1974, Patti’s music career begins to take off. She records the iconic single “Hey Joe / Piss Factory”, and the Patti Smith Group gains a cult following performing at CBGB’s. In 1975, she releases her groundbreaking debut album Horses, with a cover photo taken by Robert.

Meanwhile, Robert comes into his own as a photographer. With support from Sam Wagstaff, he begins producing powerful, often controversial images of the male nude, BDSM, and religious iconography. His photographs are both celebrated and criticized for their provocative beauty. He exhibits in major galleries and solidifies his reputation in the art world.

The two grow apart physically—Patti marries Fred "Sonic" Smith in 1980 and moves to Detroit to start a family, eventually having two children—but she and Robert never lose their connection. They call and write to each other constantly. Robert sends her letters, photos, and small gifts.

Patti writes that she never stopped being his “guardian”, and he never stopped being her “twin flame”.

=== Holding Hands with God ===
In 1986, Robert is diagnosed with AIDS. Patti, now living quietly in Detroit, re-enters his life more fully to support him. Robert continues to make art with astonishing discipline, photographing until he physically can’t. Patti visits him in New York and San Francisco, sometimes with her young children.

They collaborate once again: she writes poems and texts to accompany his work; he asks her to help curate and narrate his legacy. Patti describes Robert’s final exhibitions, particularly The Perfect Moment, which solidifies his place in art history.

Robert dies on March 9, 1989, at the age of 42. Patti is with him in his final days, praying, reading poetry, and holding his hand. She mourns him deeply, but finds solace in the promise they made: that she would tell their story.

== Title ==
The title comes from the chapter "Just Kids":

We were walking toward the fountain of Washington Square Park in New York City, the epicenter of activity, when an older couple stopped and openly observed us. Robert enjoyed being noticed, and he affectionately squeezed my hand.

"Oh, take their picture," said the woman to her bemused husband, "I think they're artists."

"Oh, go on," he shrugged. "They're just kids."

== Critical reception ==
Just Kids won the 2010 National Book Award for Nonfiction. It was Publishers Weekly's Top 10 Best Books (2010), ALA Notable Book (2011), Los Angeles Times Book Prize finalist (Current Interest, 2010), New York Times bestseller (Nonfiction, 2010), and National Book Critics Circle Award finalist (Autobiography/Memoir, 2010).

Just Kids was featured on the January 19, 2010, episode of Fresh Air, with Smith being interviewed by Terry Gross. Just Kids was also featured on KQED's Forum with Michael Krasny on January 28, 2010, and KCRW's Bookworm with host Michael Silverblatt in March 2010. It was the Book of the Week on BBC Radio 4 from 1–5 March 2010, with Smith reading five 15-minute excerpts from her book.

== Television series ==
In August 2015, it was announced that Showtime was developing a limited series based on the memoir. The network landed the rights partly because Smith wanted to collaborate with writer John Logan, being a fan of his series Penny Dreadful. However, the show has not yet been put in the works.
