= Eric Bachmann (photographer) =

Swiss photographer (1940–2019)

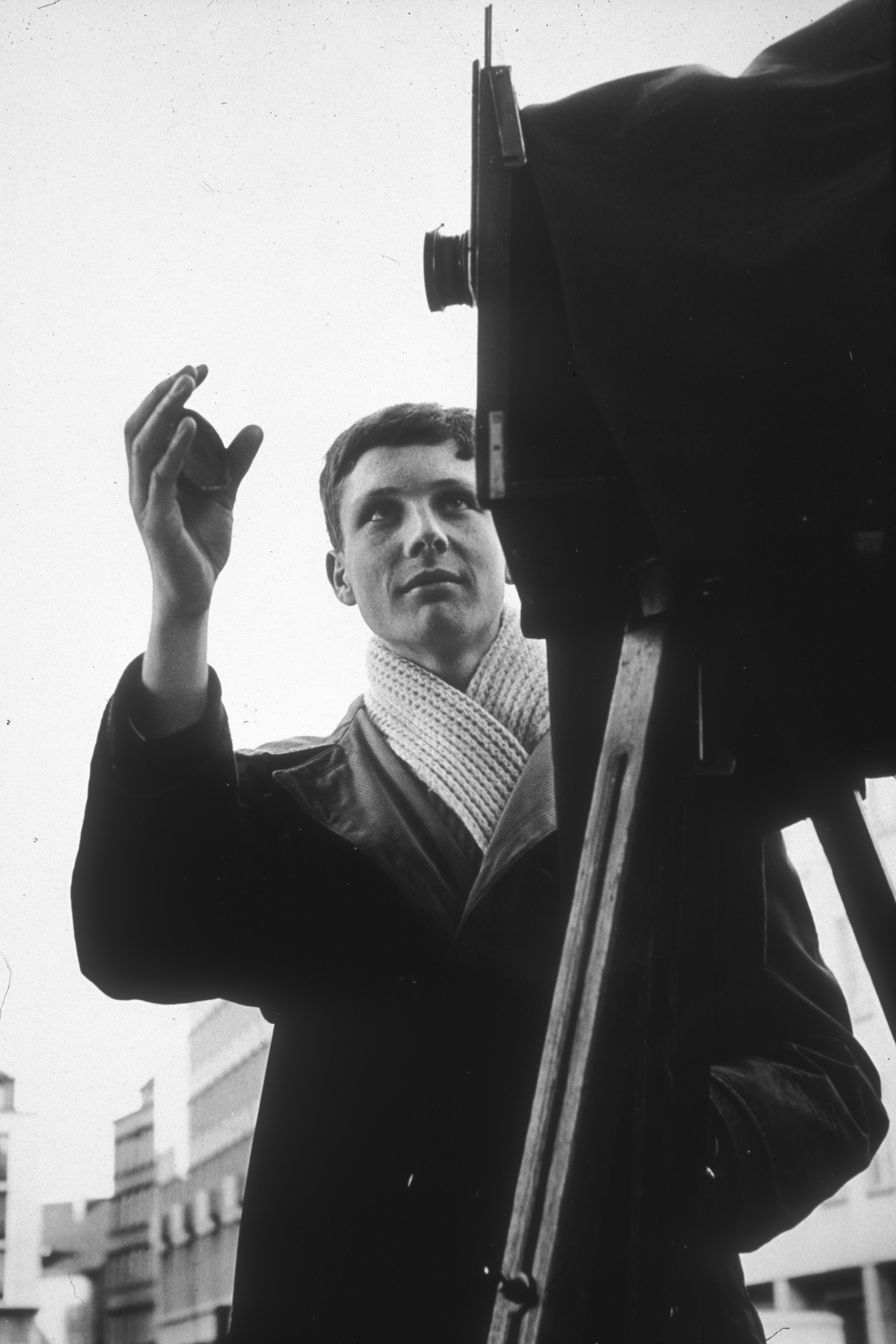
- Bachmann in 1958
- Born: 6 March 1940; Zürich, Switzerland
- Died: 20 February 2019 (aged 78); Bad Zurzach, Switzerland
- Occupations: Photographer, photojournalist

Eric Bachmann (6 March 1940 – 20 February 2019) was a Swiss photographer and photojournalist. He made portraits of Muhammad Ali, Clint Eastwood, Karl Lagerfeld and Patti Smith. In his book Leutschenbach Karambuli Bachmann documented more than 30 years of Swiss television history.

== Life and work ==
Eric Bachmann began his career in photography with an apprenticeship at Johannes Meiner's studio. From 1959 onwards, Eric Bachmann was involved in setting up the photography department of the Swiss television DRS. In 1962 he became self-employed. As a freelance photographer, he supplied magazines, magazines and newspapers with images about politics and culture for more than 50 years.

Bachmann went on reporting trips all over the world. He documented Albert Schweitzer's funeral in Lambarene, the Rwandan genocide and numerous underwater expeditions in the Red Sea.

Eric Bachmann was not yet 30 when Zurich's cultural tensions erupted in 1968. The young freelance photographer had just returned from an assignment in Venice when he arrived at Zurich Main Station and heard the megaphones. He unpacked his camera instead of going home and spent the night photographing the events, even attracting police attention.

His most striking image, taken on Bahnhofbrücke, shows the opposing sides: law-and-order defenders facing rebellious youth. The photo appeared in the National-Zeitung and Vorwärts. In 2024, the Eric Bachmann Fotoarchiv commissioned a new print for publication, and a copy was added to the Swiss National Museum.

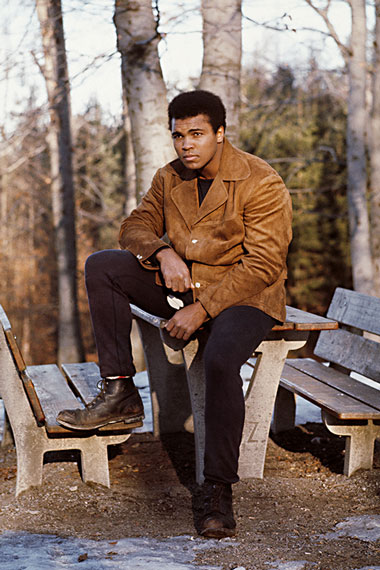
In December 1971, before his fight against Jürgen Blin in the Hallenstadion, Muhammad Ali was training on the Uetliberg in Zurich. Photographer Eric Bachmann captured this moment.

In December 1971, Muhammad Ali visited Zürich to compete in a prize fight against German Jürgen Blin. Bachmann accompanied Muhammad Ali during ten days, even during training sessions on the snow covered Uetliberg.

Bachmann was living in Kaiserstuhl, Aargau, he died on 20 February 2019, aged 78.

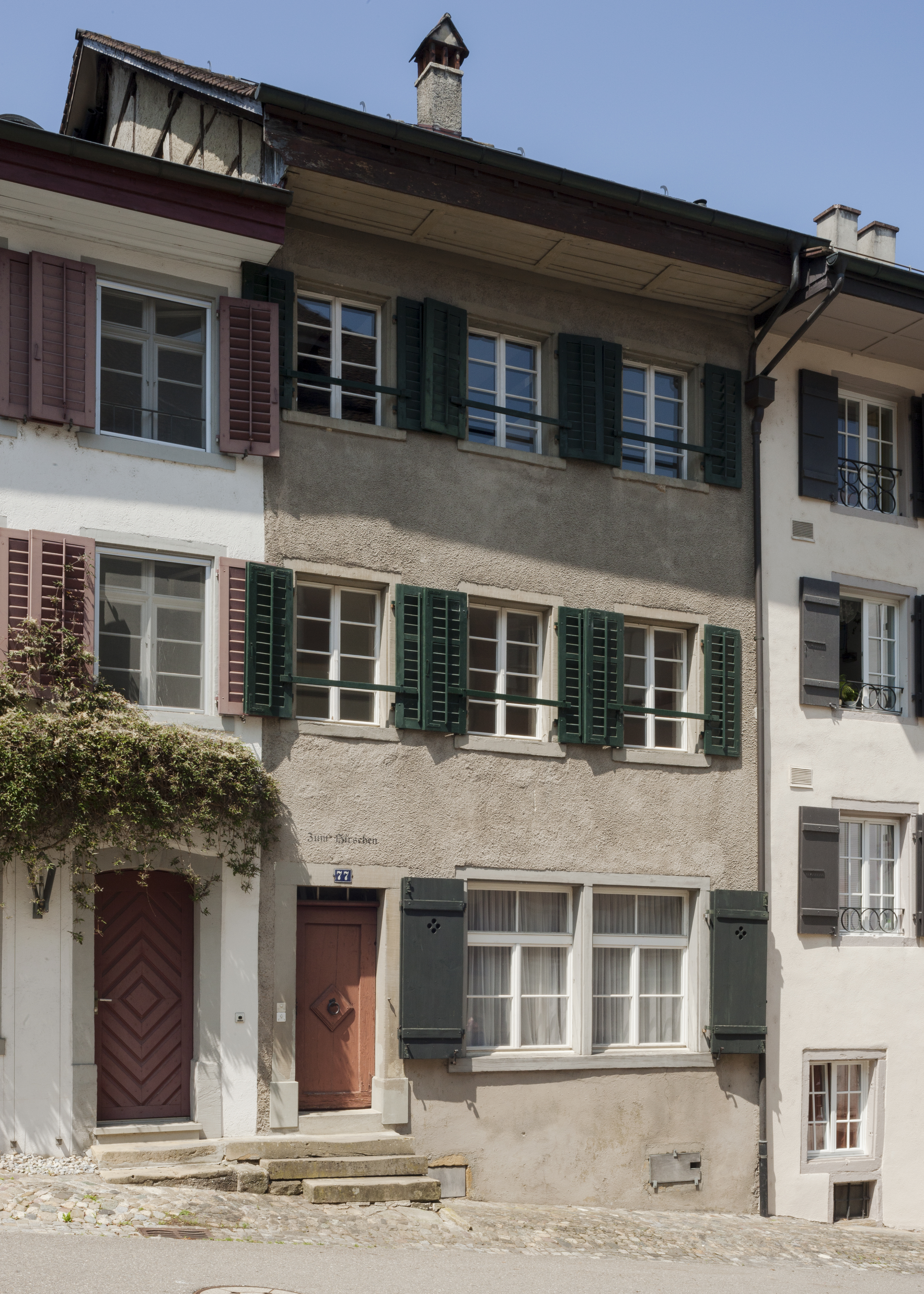
Eric Bachmann has lived in this house in Kaiserstuhl, Switzerland, since 1977.

== Reportage trips ==
From 1959 to 2017, Eric Bachmann undertook numerous international journeys, during which a large part of his photographic work was created. His reportage trips took him across Europe, Africa, Asia, North and South America, as well as the Caribbean.

Early travels included

- 1959 – England: Bournemouth, London, Portsmouth, Southampton
- 1963 – Iran: Tehran · Thailand: Bangkok, South Thailand, Chiang Mai, North Thailand · Burma: Inle Lake, Rangoon · Cambodia: Angkor · Malaysia: Singapore, Kuala Lumpur · Vietnam
- 1964 – Nepal: Kathmandu · India: Calcutta, New Delhi · Lebanon: Beirut
- 1965 – Gabon: Lambaréné
- 1966 – Red Sea Expedition · Czechoslovakia
- 1967 – Yugoslavia · Cyprus · Italy (Malta) · Albania: Berat, Durrës, Shkodër, Tirana
- 1968 – Czechoslovakia
- 1969 – Israel
- 1970 – USA: New York, Florida · Haiti · Jamaica · Barbados · Bahamas · Guadeloupe · Dominican Republic
- 1971 – Spain · Morocco · Tunisia
- 1972 – South Africa: Durban, Johannesburg, Ximba · Botswana · Uruguay · Argentina · Chile
- 1973 – Peru · Paraguay · Bolivia: La Paz · Brazil
- 1975 – Yugoslavia
Selection photos from early travel reports

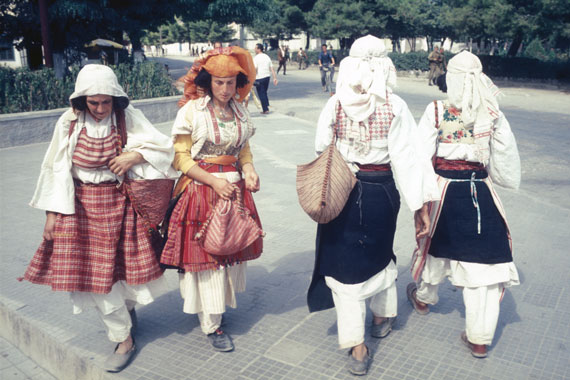
Albania Skutari 1967

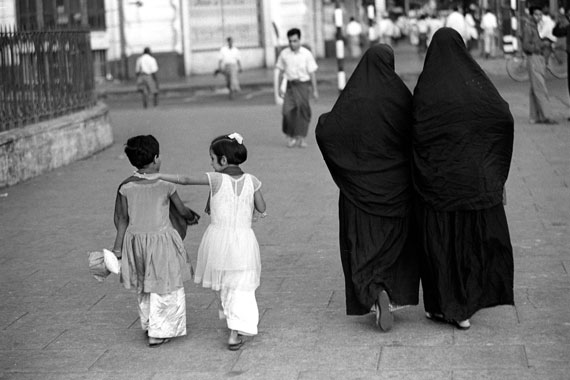
Myanmar Rangun 1963

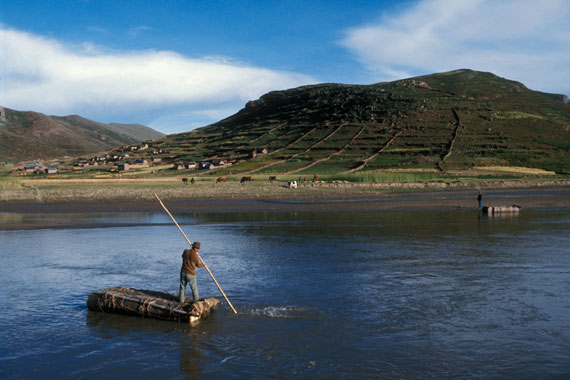
Peru Lake Titicaca 1973

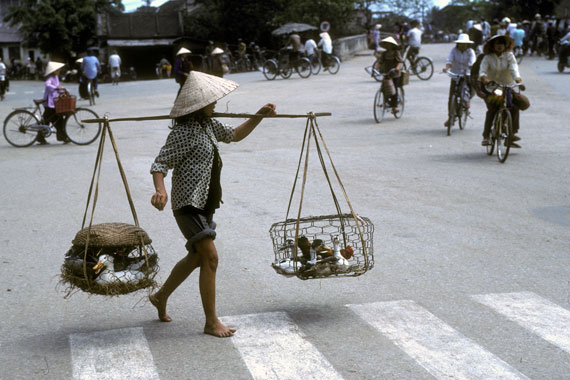
Vietnam Saigon 1969

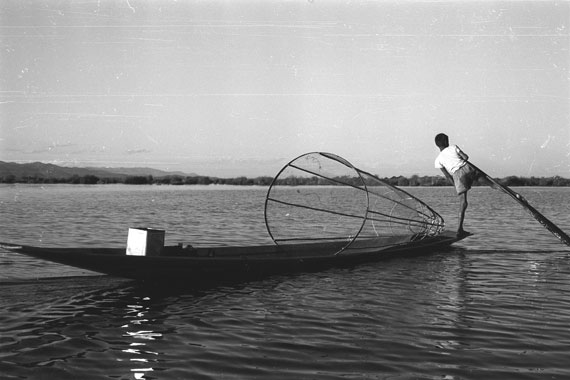
Myanmar Inlay Lake 1963

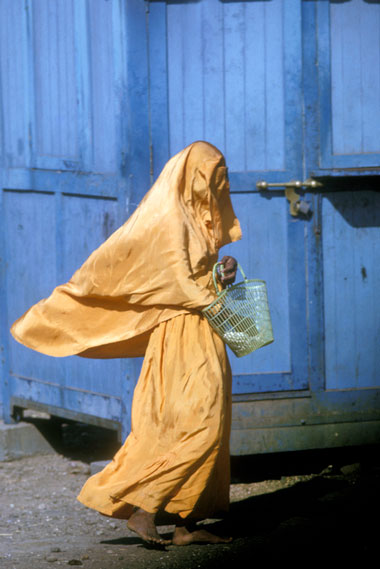
Pakistan Karachi 1963

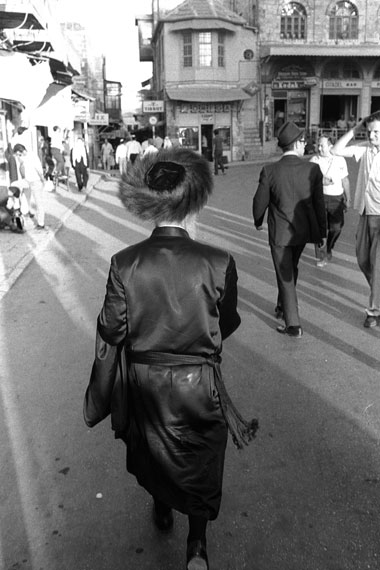
Jerusalem 1971

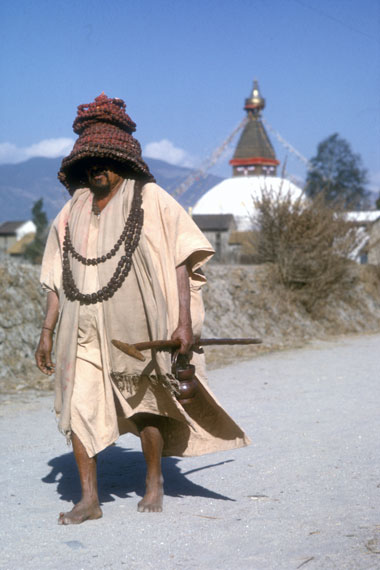
Nepal Bodnath 1964

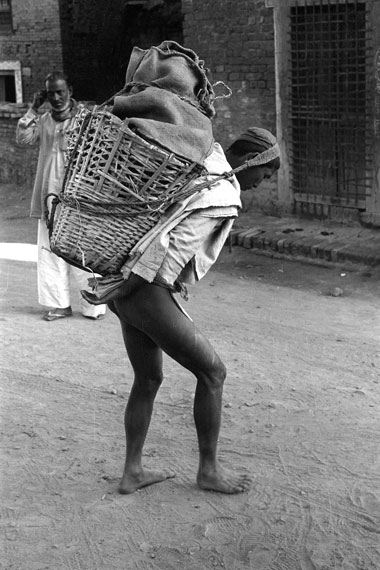
Nepal Kathmandu 1964

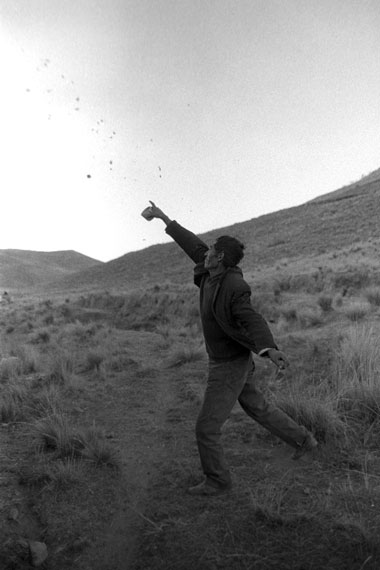
Peru Putina 1973

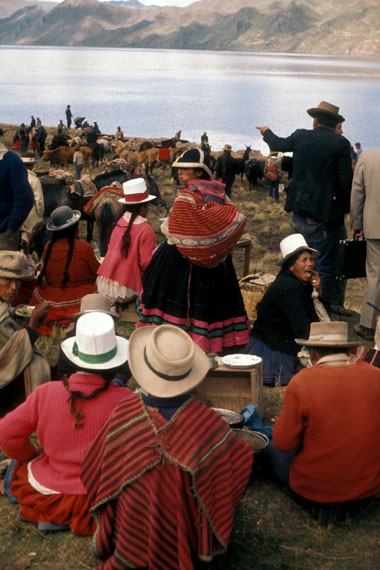
Peru Lake Langui Layo 1973

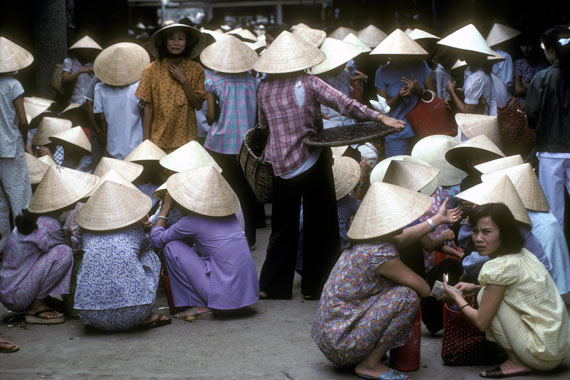
Vietnam Saigon 1969

== Archive and association ==
His archive with an estimated 200,000 negatives and slides was given to his nephew Dominik Bachmann, who is actively administrating and promoting it. Being himself a graphic designer he publishes regularly books with pictures of Eric Bachmann.

Since 2025 the work in the archive is supported by an association which carries the name of the defunt photographer: Eric Bachmann Association.

== Individual Publications ==
- 1986: So ischs gsi ...: Geschichten aus Kaiserstuhl. Kaiserstuhl: Parterre Amtshaus, 1986; 2002. Text by Heidi Schmid. ISBN 978-3-908013-01-3.
- 2001: Leutschenbach Karambuli: Perlen aus dem Archiv eines Fernsehfotografen. Zürich: Edition Patrick Frey. Text by Walter Bretscher. ISBN 978-3-905509-35-9.
- 2014: Muhammad Ali, Zürich, 26.12.1971. Zürich: Edition Patrick Frey. Text by Peter Hartmann, Eugen Sorg. ISBN 978-3-905929-65-2.
  - Zürich: Edition Patrick Frey. English-language version. ISBN 978-3-905929-64-5.
- 2016: Casa Verdi. Zürich: Edition Patrick Frey. Texts by various authors, English and German. ISBN 978-3-906803-25-8.
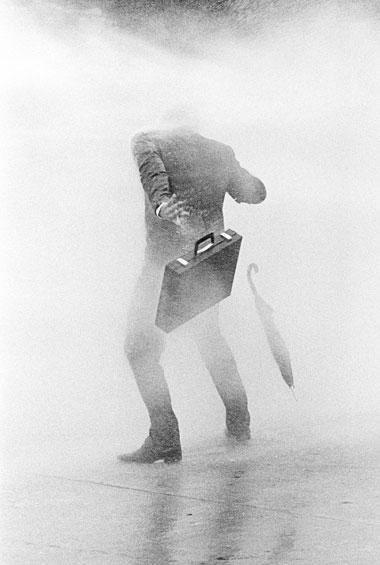
  In spring 1969, photographer Eric Bachmann stepped into the line of a water cannon at the cantonal police yard in Wädenswil. Wearing a neoprene suit and using an underwater camera, he photographed Ringier editor-in-chief Robert Naef. The series was published in 2023 in the photo book The one-man water cannon test.
- 2023: The one-man water cannon test, everyedition. ISBN 978-3-907384-06-0.
- 2025: Patti Smith Group, Live in Zurich, October 1976. everyedition. ISBN 978-3-907384-19-0.
- 2026: Heidi Abel - Ansage und Engagement. Fotografien von Eric Bachmann. Christoph Merian Verlag, ISBN 978-3-03969-066-4.

== Exhibitions ==
- 1978: Rhein-Brücken, Amtshaus, Kaiserstuhl
- 1986: So ischs gsi. Geschichten aus Kaiserstuhl, Amtshaus, Kaiserstuhl
- 1992: Shetland and Leningrad im Winter, Globus, Zürich
- 1996: Gränichen Wald, Chornhuus, Gränichen
- 2014: L'Homme dans le monde – Der Mensch in der Welt, Photobastei et al., Zürich; Lausanne; Gex
- 2018: Now You See Me! – Muhammad Ali (1942–2016), Bildhalle, Zürich
- 2019: Canvetto Cultura, Fondazione Diamante, Lugano
- 2023: The one-man water cannon test, BBA Gallery, Berlin
- 2024: The one-man water cannon test, Architektur Forum Ostschweiz, St. Gallen
- 2024: Wild Card 20 – dieses buch ist gratis, Strauhof Literaturmuseum, Zürich
- 2024: Politik der Strasse and other projects, Die Diele, Zürich
