= Ha! Ha! Houdini! =

Book by Patti Smith

- First edition
- Author: Patti Smith
- Language: English
- Genre: Poetry
- Publisher: Gotham Book Mart
- Publication date: 1977
- Publication place: United States
- Media type: Chapbook
- Pages: 8
- ISBN: 978-0-910664-46-2

"Ha! Ha! Houdini!" is a poem by Patti Smith, published as a chapbook in 1977.
