= People Have the Power =

Single by Patti Smith

from the album Dream of Life
- B-side: "Where Duty Calls", "Wild Leaves"
- Released: June 1, 1988
- Recorded: The Hit Factory
- Genre: Rock
- Length: 5:07
- Label: Arista
- Songwriters: Patti Smith, Fred Smith
- Producers: Fred Smith, Jimmy Iovine

Patti Smith singles chronology
"So You Want to Be (A Rock 'n' Roll Star)" (1979)	"People Have the Power" (1988)	"Looking for You (I Was)" (1988)

Audio sample
- file; help

"People Have the Power" is a rock song written by Patti Smith and Fred "Sonic" Smith, and released as a lead single from Patti Smith's 1988 album Dream of Life. The cover photograph is by Robert Mapplethorpe. The music video is filmed mostly in black-and-white and features Patti Smith singing, writing and walking.

The song was ranked number 22 on NME magazine's list of the "Singles of the Year".

== Live performances ==
In 2019, Smith performed the song with 250 volunteer singers at The Public Theater. For most of U2's 2015 Innocence + Experience Tour, the group used "People Have the Power" as their entrance music. Smith herself joined them to close their show with a performance of the song at London's O2 Arena on October 29, as well as the December 6 show at Accorhotels Arena in Paris. On December 7, to close their show and the tour at Accorhotels Arena, U2 invited Eagles of Death Metal on-stage to perform the song with them. It was Eagles of Death Metal's first public performance since the attack on their 13 November 2015 concert at the Bataclan in Paris that resulted in 89 fatalities.

In March 2026, Smith performed the song at the 30th anniversary celebration of independent media outlet Democracy Now! in New York City. Smith was joined on stage by Bruce Springsteen, Michael Stipe of R.E.M. and others.

== Lyrical content ==
According to Howard Zinn and Anthony Arnove, the song including the lyrics "People have the power to redeem the work of fools" was performed frequently as a protest song during the Iraq War. Mark Tushnet included this quote in the Preface for his book Taking the Constitution Away from the Courts.

== Charts ==
=== Weekly charts ===
Chart (1988)	Peak position
Italy Airplay (Music & Media)	18
UK Singles Chart	97
US Mainstream Rock Tracks	19
