= Cowboy Mouth (play) =

1971 play by Sam Shepard and Patti Smith

Cowboy Mouth is a one-act theatrical play originally produced in 1971 and jointly written by Sam Shepard and Patti Smith.

== Premieres ==
The play received its world premiere at The Traverse Theatre in Edinburgh, Scotland on April 12, 1971, directed by Gordon Stewart.

Its American premiere was at The American Place Theatre in New York City on April 29, 1971. The production was directed by Robert Glaudini, with Shepard and Smith playing the two lead roles.

== Plot ==
Three characters make up the cast: Slim, an anthropomorphic cat dressed like a coyote; Cavale, an anthropomorphic crow; and a symbolic character simply referred to as Lobster Man.

The play follows Slim and Cavale living in sin as aspiring rock stars. As the first major turning, Cavale kidnaps Slim at gunpoint and holds him captive in her motel room; the two fall in love despite Slim's family who reside in Brooklyn. Unable to move, yet at complete unrest, Slim swings from blaming Cavale for the disaster that is his life to begging her to tell him stories about French poets. Cavale was formerly incarcerated and explores past experiences including electric shocks and having to wear metal plates around her club foot when she was younger. She muses about playing the ugly duckling as a child, into the role without even the satisfaction of emerging as a beautiful swan at the end. Near the end of the piece the two call on an imaginary Lobster Man for sustenance and entertainment.

== Genre and themes ==
Shepard had been working extensively in New York as a playwright by 1971, most notably at La Mama Theatre which offers an unbridled platform for playwrights to display their work. This piece, along with other early Shepard one-act plays follows the theatrical genre of Theatre of the Absurd.

Themes utilized within the short piece claim that the American Dream does little more for the individual besides spoiling happiness. The title of the play comes from the idea that modern Americans were looking for a 'saint with a cowboy mouth'.

== Writing ==
...With your childhood flames on your midnight rug
And your Spanish manners and your mother's drugs
And your cowboy mouth and your curfew plugs...
- Bob Dylan
Sad Eyed Lady of the Lowlands

In her book Just Kids, Smith details the writing of Cowboy Mouth near the end of her relationship with Shepard. At Shepard's urging, the two retired to his room to write the play over the course of a night. Smith was reluctant to begin writing and write in conflict, but Shepard encouraged her to "Say anything. You can't make a mistake when you improvise." Smith wrote:

"Sam was right. It wasn't hard at all to write the play. We just told each other stories. The characters were ourselves, and we encoded our love, imagination, and indiscretions in Cowboy Mouth. Perhaps it wasn't so much a play as a ritual. We ritualized the end of our adventure and created a portal of escape for Sam."

Slim was the name Shepard used to introduced himself to Smith when the two of them met. Like Slim, Shepard was married and had an infant at the time he and Smith were in a relationship and wrote the play. Like Slim, Shepard returned to his family, though he did so on the third night of Cowboy Mouth. Cavale's name comes from the book La Cavale, Smith's favorite book of the French-Algerian writer Albertine Sarrazin. "Cavale" means "escape" in French.
