= Early Morning Dream =

Book by Patti Smith

- Author: Patti Smith
- Language: English
- Genre: Poetry
- Publisher: s.n.
- Publication date: 1972
- Publication place: United States
- Pages: 8

Early Morning Dream is a book by Patti Smith. Only 100 copies were produced by mimeography, instead of through a standard publishing house, in 1972.
