= The Night (Smith/Verlaine book) =

Poetry book co-written by Patti Smith and Tom Verlaine

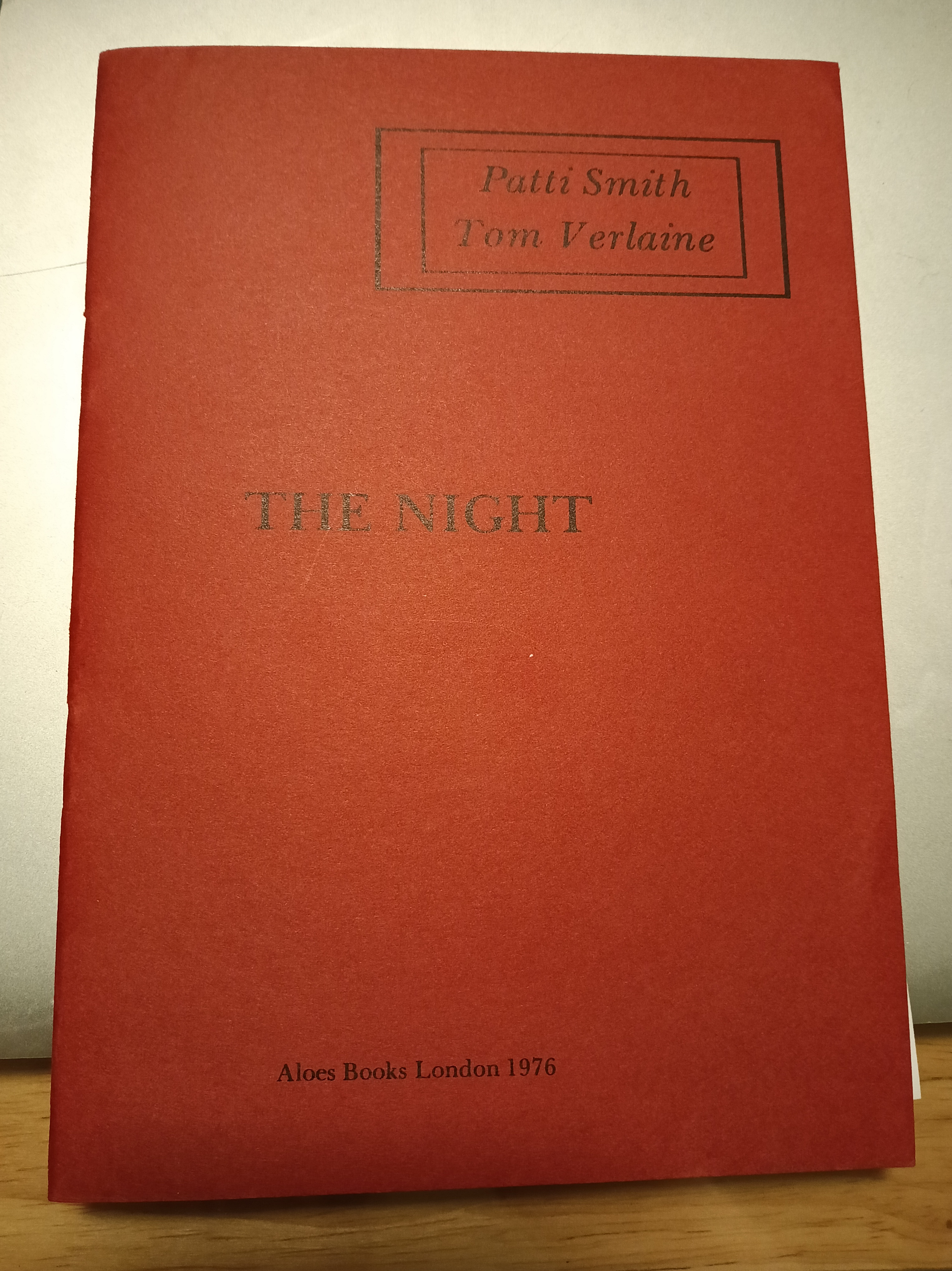
- Author: Patti Smith, Tom Verlaine
- Language: English, French
- Genre: Poetry collection
- Publisher: Aloes Books, Fear Press
- Publication date: 1976
- Publication place: United Kingdom, France
- Media type: Print (chapbook)
- Pages: 22

The Night is a book of poems by Patti Smith and Tom Verlaine, published in 1976.

== Background ==
Smith and Verlaine briefly met in 1973 near St. Mark’s Church in New York. About a year later, Smith saw Verlaine playing with Television at Max's Kansas City. The two became romantically involved in 1974 and collaborated on "Break It Up," a song from Smith's debut album Horses.

== Contents ==
The book features 22 poems, 11 authored by Smith, 11 by Verlaine. Smith's poems are the odd-numbered poems, while Verlaine's are the even-numbered ones.

The poems are mostly short and free verse or prose poems. The first poem, by Smith, connects format and subject, noting that "the night possesses 22 properties: 11 saintly 11 satanic" in Moroccan tradition.

== Publication ==
In 1976, The Night was published by Aloes Books in London, and by Fear Press in Paris. The Fear Press edition was bilingual, in English and French.

For the Aloes Books printing of The Night, the cover and title page design were modeled on an 1896 edition of Rimbaud’s Les Illuminations. A second planned installment of The Night, to be called Independence Day, was never issued.
