= Steven Sebring =

American photographer (born 1966)

Steven Sebring (born 1966) is an American photographer, filmmaker and producer. His 2008 documentary Patti Smith: Dream of Life earned him a Sundance Award for Excellence in Cinematography and a Primetime Emmy nomination. He also directed the concert-documentary film Horses: Patti Smith and her Band premiering at Tribeca Film Festival in 2018.

== Life and career ==
Raised in Arizona, Sebring experimented with photography in high school before moving to Europe for several years, beginning his career in fashion photography. In 1995, Sebring was commissioned by Spin magazine to photograph singer-songwriter and poet Patti Smith, establishing a relationship that culminated in Sebring filming Smith over 11 years to produce the documentary film Dream of Life in his directorial debut, for which he received many accolades.

Sebring's editorial photographs and films have been featured in Vogue, W, and Vanity Fair, and he has shot and directed campaigns for MAC Cosmetics, Estée Lauder, DKNY, and more. In 2014, Sebring collaborated with supermodel Coco Rocha to create Study of Pose, a book chronicling 1,000 different poses. The book was accompanied by an exhibition of the same name at Milk Gallery, as well as interactive videos for each pose through a companion app, allowing viewers to manipulate each image to see Rocha's pose from any angle, emphasizing its use beyond just an art tome as a veritable reference book. Sebring's work has been the subject of numerous gallery shows and exhibitions, most notably a three-day multimedia installation at the 69th Regiment Armory titled "Revolution," showcasing works that paid tribute to Marcel Duchamp and Eadward Muybridge, both of whom Sebring counts as influences.

In 2018, Sebring photographed the cover art for supergroup A Perfect Circle's album Eat the Elephant in addition to a 58-minute holographic film accompanying the music, earning Eat the Elephant the title of the "world's first hologram album".

== Selected exhibitions ==
A few of Steven Sebring's exhibitions are listed below:

2014

- Study of Pose, Milk Gallery, New York

2013

- Revolution, 69th Regiment Armory, New York

2011

- Illumination, (in conjunction with Patti Smith) Milk Gallery, New York

2010

- Objects of Life, (in conjunction with Patti Smith) Robert Miller Gallery, New York

== Publications ==
- Bygone Days. New York: Distributed Art Publishers, Inc. 2005.
- Lalanne. New York: Reed Krakoff/Paul Kasmin/Ben Brown. 2007.
- Patti Smith: Dream of Life. Companion book to the documentary film, including photographs by Patti Smith. New York: Rizzoli. 2008.
- Study of Pose. New York: Harper's Design. With an introduction by Jean-Paul Gaultier. 2014.

== Filmography ==
- Patti Smith: Dream of Life (2008)
- Horses: Patti Smith and her Band (2018)
