= Year of the Monkey (book) =

2019 memoir by Patti Smith

- First edition
- Author: Patti Smith
- Subject: Memoir
- Publisher: Alfred A. Knopf
- Publication date: 2019
- Media type: Print / Audio
- Pages: 171
- ISBN: 978-0525657682

Year of the Monkey is a 2019 memoir by Patti Smith. The work describes a single year in Smith's life, 2016, which she spent traveling on her own. The book is part travelogue and part dream journal, as Smith often interrupts the narrative to describe her dreams.
