= Patti Smith =

American singer and songwriter (born 1946)

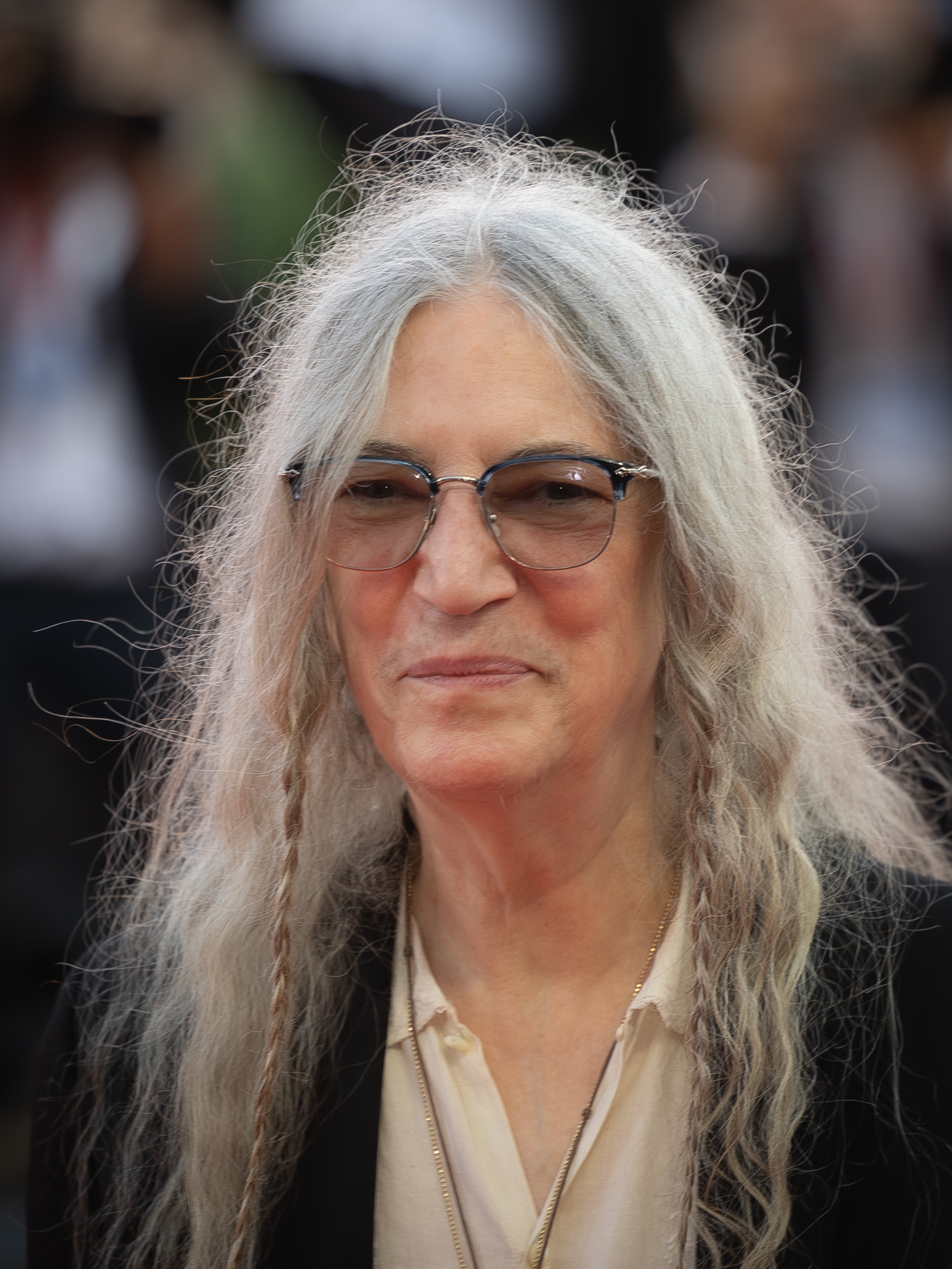
- Smith at the 81st Venice International Film Festival, 2024

Background information
- Born: Patricia Lee Smith; December 30, 1946 (age 79); Chicago, Illinois, U.S.
- Origin: Deptford Township, New Jersey, U.S.
- Genres: Punk rock; art punk; proto-punk; art rock; garage rock; pop rock; spoken word
- Occupations: Singer; songwriter; poet; painter; author; photographer
- Instruments: Vocals; guitar; clarinet
- Works: Patti Smith discography
- Years active: 1967–present
- Labels: Arista; Columbia
- Spouse: Frederick Smith (m. 1980; died 1994)
- Website: pattismith.net

Patricia Lee Smith (born December 30, 1946) is an American singer, songwriter, poet, and author. Her 1975 debut album, Horses, established her as an influential member of the New York City–based punk rock movement, earning the nicknames "Queen of Punk" and "Godmother of Punk". Smith has fused rock and poetry in her work. In 1978, her most widely known song, "Because the Night", co-written with Bruce Springsteen, reached number 13 on the Billboard Hot 100 chart and number five on the UK Singles Chart. Smith is also the author of several works of non-fiction and poetry, and her memoir Just Kids won the National Book Award in 2010.

In 2005, Smith was named a Commander of the Ordre des Arts et des Lettres by the French Ministry of Culture. In 2007, she was inducted into the Rock and Roll Hall of Fame. She is ranked 47th on Rolling Stone magazine's 100 Greatest Artists of all Time, published in 2010, and was awarded the Polar Music Prize in 2011.

== Early life and education ==
Smith was born on December 30, 1946, at Grant Hospital in the Lincoln Park section of Chicago, to Beverly Smith, a jazz singer turned waitress, and Grant Smith, a Honeywell machinist. Her family is of partially Irish ancestry (though in her 2025 memoir Bread of Angels, Smith revealed that she learned at age 70 that Grant Smith was in fact not her biological father and her patrilineal lineage is Ashkenazi Jewish). Patti is the eldest of four children, with siblings Linda, Todd, and Kimberly.

When Smith was four, the family moved from Chicago to the Germantown section of Philadelphia, then to Pitman, New Jersey, and finally settled in the Woodbury Gardens section of Deptford Township, New Jersey. At an early age, Smith was exposed to music, including the albums Shrimp Boats by Harry Belafonte, The Money Tree by Patience and Prudence, and Another Side of Bob Dylan, Bob Dylan's fourth album, released in 1964, which her mother gave her.

In 1964, Smith graduated from Deptford Township High School, and began working in a factory. She briefly attended Glassboro State College, now Rowan University, in Glassboro, New Jersey.

== Career ==
=== Early work ===
In 1969, Smith went to Paris with her sister, and started busking and doing performance art. When Smith returned to Manhattan, she lived at the Hotel Chelsea with Robert Mapplethorpe. They frequented Max's Kansas City on Park Avenue, and Smith provided the spoken word soundtrack for Sandy Daley's art film Robert Having His Nipple Pierced, starring Mapplethorpe. The same year, Smith appeared with Jayne County in Jackie Curtis's play Femme Fatale. She also starred in Anthony Ingrassia's play Island. As a member of the Poetry Project, she spent the early 1970s painting, writing, and performing.

In 1971, Smith performed in the one-act play Cowboy Mouth, which she co-wrote with Sam Shepard. She wrote several poems about Shepard and their relationship including "Sam Shepard: 9 Random Years (7 + 2)". On February 10, 1971, Smith, accompanied by Lenny Kaye on electric guitar, opened for Gerard Malanga, which was her first public poetry performance.

Smith was briefly considered as lead singer for Blue Öyster Cult. She contributed lyrics to several Blue Öyster Cult songs, including "Debbie Denise", which was inspired by her poems "In Remembrance of Debbie Denise", "Baby Ice Dog", "Career of Evil", "Fire of Unknown Origin", "The Revenge of Vera Gemini", on which she performs duet vocals, and "Shooting Shark". At the time, she was romantically involved with Allen Lanier, Blue Öyster Cult's keyboardist. During these years, Smith was also a rock music journalist, writing periodically for Rolling Stone and Creem.

=== Formation of the Patti Smith Group and breakthrough ===
In 1973, Smith teamed up again with musician and rock archivist Lenny Kaye, and later added Richard Sohl on piano. The trio developed into a full band with the addition of Ivan Král on guitar and bass and Jay Dee Daugherty on drums. Financed by Sam Wagstaff, the band recorded their first single, "Hey Joe/Piss Factory" in 1974. The A-side was a version of the rock standard with the addition of a spoken word piece about Patty Hearst, a fugitive heiress. The B-side describes the helpless alienation Smith felt while working on a factory assembly line and the salvation she dreams of achieving by escaping to New York City. In a 1996 interview on artistic influences during her younger years, Smith said, "I had devoted so much of my girlish daydreams to Arthur Rimbaud. Rimbaud was like my boyfriend."

Later the same year, she performed "I Wake Up Screaming", a poem, on The Whole Thing Started with Rock & Roll Now It's Out of Control, an album by The Doors' Ray Manzarek.

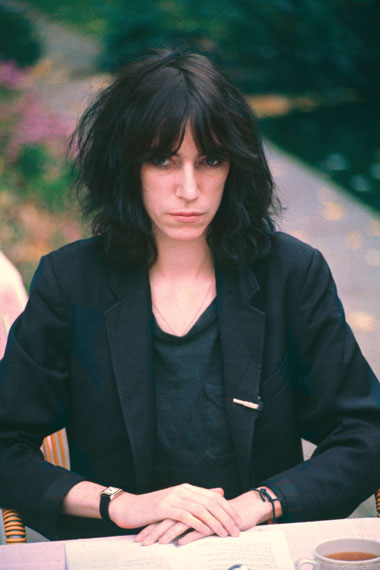
Smith, photographed by Eric Bachmann, during an interview in October 1976

In March 1975, the Patti Smith Group began a two-month weekend set of shows at CBGB in New York City with the band Television. The Patti Smith Group was spotted by Clive Davis, who signed them to Arista Records.

Later that year, the Patti Smith Group recorded their debut album, Horses, produced by John Cale amid some tension. The album fused punk rock and spoken poetry and begins with a cover of Van Morrison's "Gloria", and Smith's opening words: "Jesus died for somebody's sins but not mine", an excerpt from "Oath", one of Smith's early poems. The austere cover photograph by Mapplethorpe has become one of rock's classic images.

As punk rock grew in popularity, the Patti Smith Group toured the U.S. and Europe. The rawer sound of the group's second album, Radio Ethiopia, reflected this. Considerably less accessible than Horses, Radio Ethiopia initially received poor reviews. However, several songs have stood the test of time, and Smith still performs them live. She has said that Radio Ethiopia was influenced by the band MC5.

On January 23, 1977, while touring in support of Radio Ethiopia, Smith accidentally danced off a high stage in Tampa, Florida, and fell 15 feet onto a concrete orchestra pit, breaking several cervical vertebrae. The injury required a period of rest and physical therapy, during which she says she was able to reassess, reenergize, and reorganize her life.

The Patti Smith Group produced two further albums. Easter, released in 1978, was their most commercially successful record. It included the band's top single "Because the Night", co-written with Bruce Springsteen. Wave (1979) was less successful, although the songs "Frederick" and "Dancing Barefoot" received commercial airplay.

Through most of the 1980s, Smith lived with her family in St. Clair Shores, Michigan, and was semi-retired from music. She ultimately moved back to New York City.

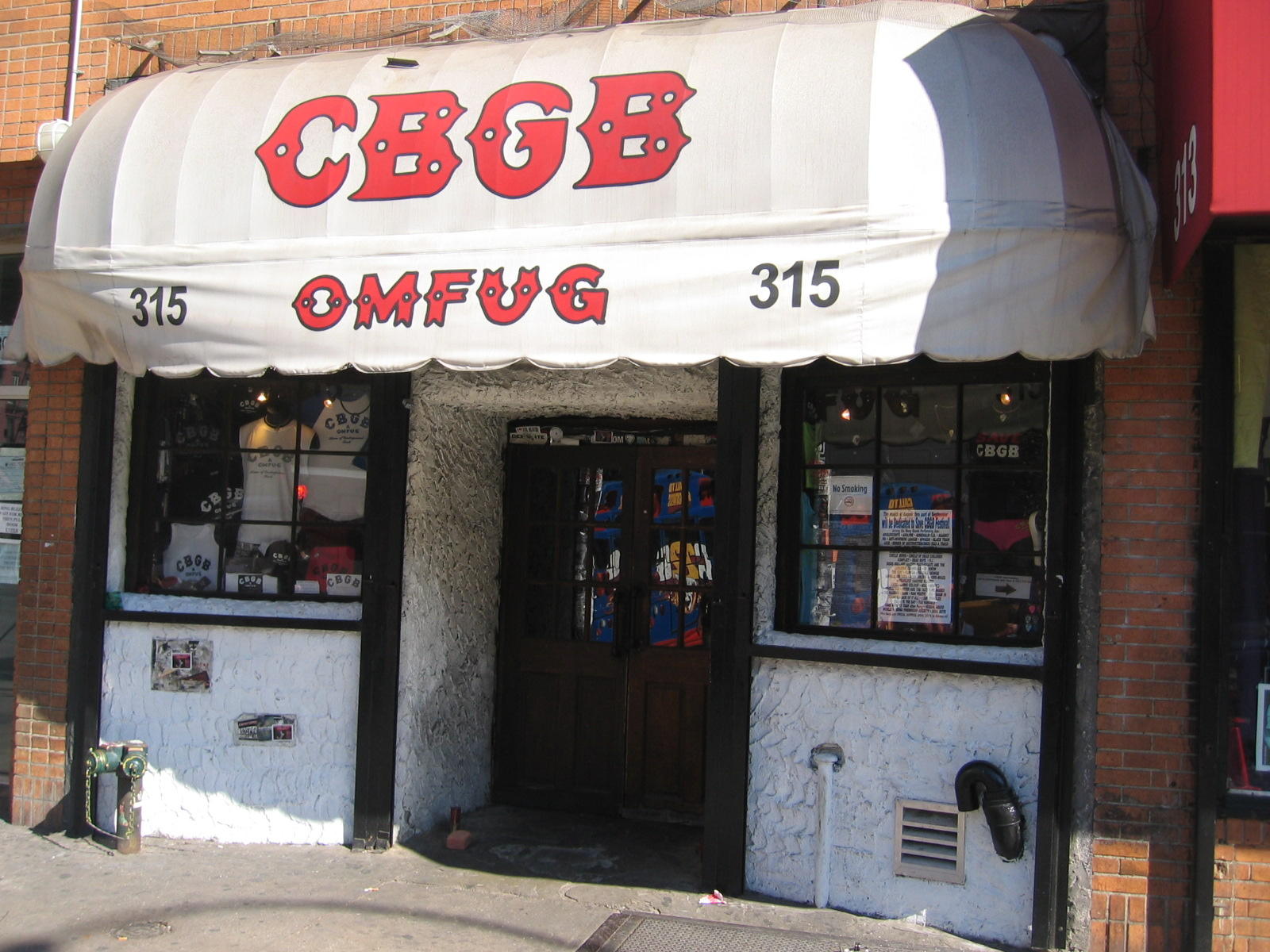
On October 15, 2006, Smith performed a 3½-hour tour de force show to close out CBGB, the famed New York City live music venue.

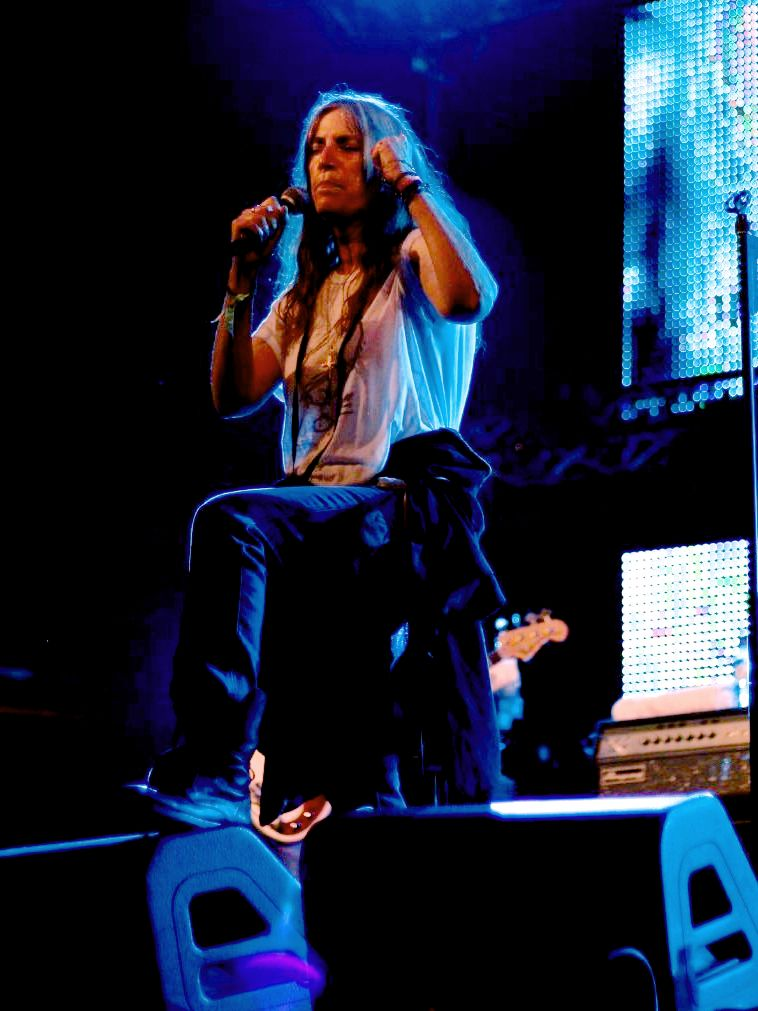
Smith performing at Primavera Sound Festival in Barcelona, in June 2007

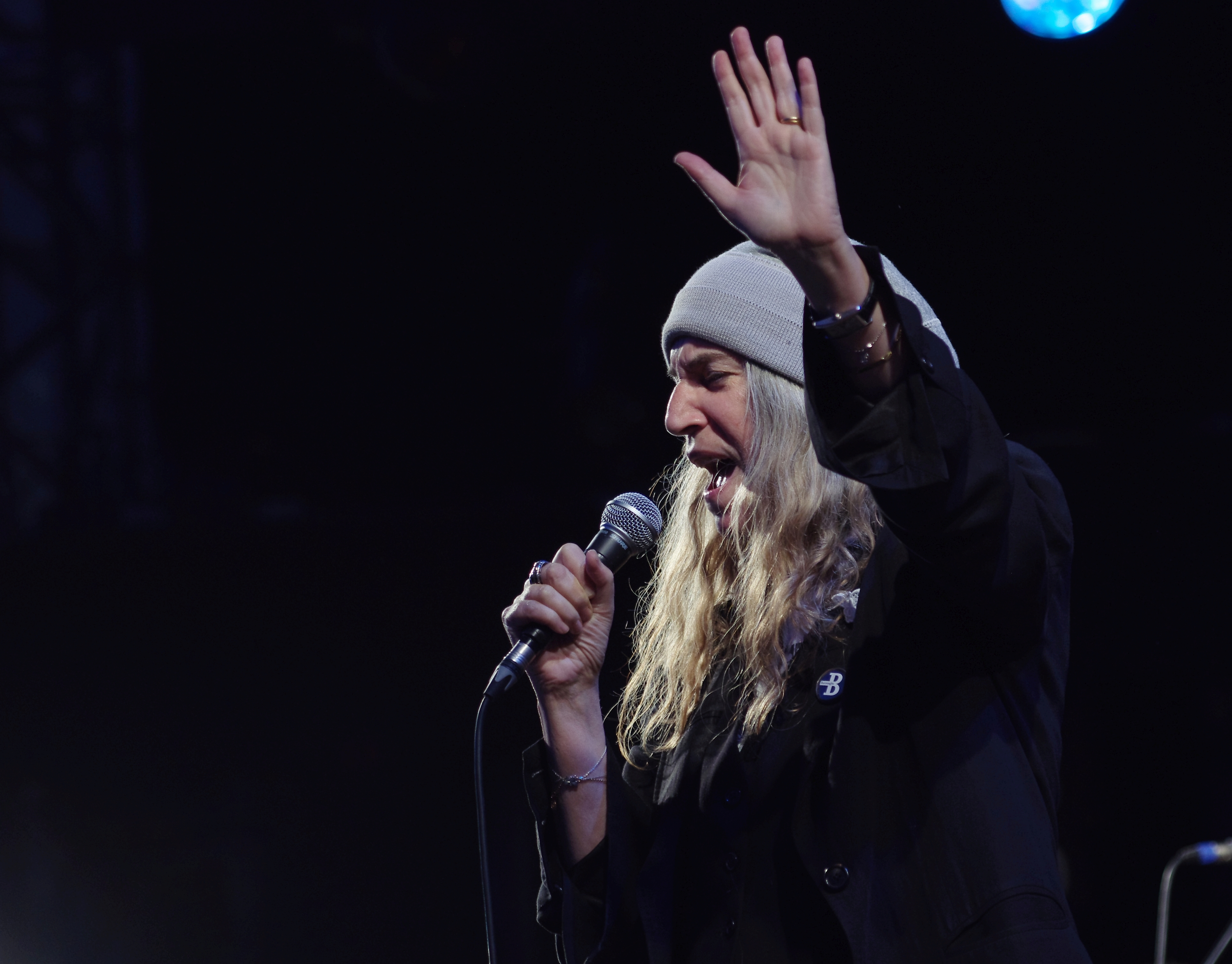
Smith performing at Haldern Pop in North Rhine-Westphalia, Germany, in August 2014

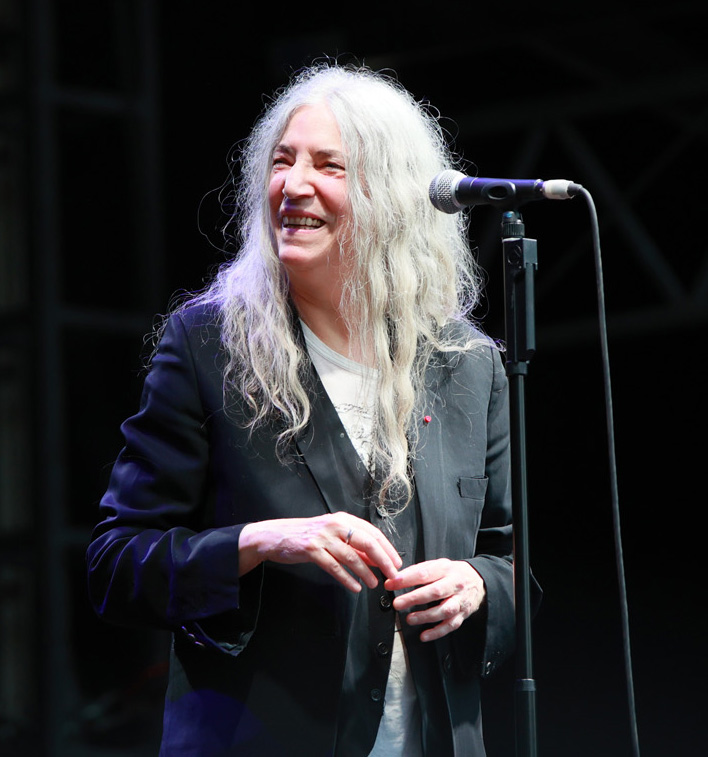
Smith performing in Berlin, in June 2022

In June 1988, Smith released the album Dream of Life, which included the song "People Have the Power". Michael Stipe of R.E.M. and Allen Ginsberg, whom she had known since her early years in New York City, urged her return to live music and touring. She toured briefly with Bob Dylan in December 1995, which is chronicled in a book of photographs by Stipe.

In 1996, Smith worked with her long-time band to record Gone Again, featuring "About a Boy", a tribute to Kurt Cobain, the former lead singer of Nirvana who died by suicide in 1994. The same year, she collaborated with Stipe on "E-Bow the Letter", a song on R.E.M.'s New Adventures in Hi-Fi, which she performed live with the band. After the release of Gone Again, Smith recorded two further albums, Peace and Noise in 1997, which included the single "1959" about China's invasion of Tibet, and Gung Ho in 2000, which included songs about Ho Chi Minh and Smith's late father. Smith was nominated for the Grammy Award for Best Female Rock Vocal Performance for two songs, "1959" and "Glitter in Their Eyes". The release of her comeback record was followed by publication of a box set of Smith's work remastered and packaged as The Patti Smith Masters.

=== Continued career into the 21st century ===
In 2002, Smith released Land (1975–2002), a two-CD compilation that includes a cover of Prince's "When Doves Cry". Smith's solo art exhibition Strange Messenger was hosted at the Andy Warhol Museum in Pittsburgh on September 28, 2002. On April 27, 2004, Smith released Trampin', which included several songs about motherhood, partly in tribute to Smith's mother, who died two years earlier. It was her first album on Columbia Records, which later became a sister label to her Arista Records, her previous label. Smith curated the Meltdown festival in London on June 25, 2005, in which she performed Horses live in its entirety for the first time. This live performance was released later in 2004 as Horses/Horses.

On October 15, 2006, Smith performed a 3½-hour tour de force show to close out at CBGB, which was an immensely influential New York City live music venue for much of the late 20th and early 21st centuries. At the CBGB show, Smith took the stage at 9:30 p.m. (EDT) and closed her show a few minutes after 1:00 am. Her final song was "Elegie", after which she read a list of punk rock musicians and advocates who had died in the previous years, representing the last public song and words performed at the iconic venue.

Smith's tenth full-length release Twelve, an all-covers album released by Columbia Records, features such songs as Jimi Hendrix "Are You Experienced?", Nirvana's "Smells Like Teen Spirit", and Rolling Stones' "Gimme Shelter". The next year, she came out with a live album, The Coral Sea, in collaboration with Kevin Shields. On September 10, 2009, after a week of smaller events and exhibitions in Florence, Smith played an open-air concert at Piazza Santa Croce, commemorating her performance in the same city 30 years earlier.

Smith recorded a cover of Buddy Holly's "Words of Love" for the CD Rave on Buddy Holly, a tribute album tied to Holly's 75th birthday, which was released June 28, 2011.

She also recorded the song "Capitol Letter" for the official soundtrack of the second film of the Hunger Games' series The Hunger Games: Catching Fire.

Smith's 11th studio album, Banga, was released in June 2012. American Songwriter wrote that, "These songs aren't as loud or frantic as those of her late 70s heyday, but they resonate just as boldly as she moans, chants, speaks and spits out lyrics with the grace and determination of Muhammad Ali in his prime. It's not an easy listen—the vast majority of her music never has been—but if you're a fan and/or prepared for the challenge, this is as potent, heady and uncompromising as she has ever gotten, and with Smith's storied history as a musical maverick, that's saying plenty." Metacritic awarded the album a score of 81, indicating "universal acclaim".

Also in 2012, Smith recorded a cover of Io come persona by Italian singer-songwriter Giorgio Gaber.

In 2015, Smith wrote "Aqua Teen Dream" to commemorate the series finale of Aqua Teen Hunger Force. The vocal track was recorded in a hotel overlooking Lerici's Bay of Poets. On September 26, 2015, Smith performed at the American Museum of Tort Law convocation ceremony.

On December 6, 2015, she made an appearance at the Paris show of U2's Innocence + Experience Tour, performing "Bad" and "People Have the Power" with U2.

In 2016, Smith performed "People Have the Power" at Riverside Church in Manhattan to celebrate the 20th anniversary of Democracy Now, where she was joined by Michael Stipe. On December 10, 2016, Smith attended the Nobel Prize Award Ceremony in Stockholm on behalf of Bob Dylan, winner of the Nobel Prize in Literature, who could not be present due to prior commitments. After the official presentation speech for the literary prize by Horace Engdahl, the perpetual secretary of the Swedish Academy, Smith sang the Dylan song "A Hard Rain's a-Gonna Fall". She incorrectly sang one verse, singing, "I saw the babe that was just bleedin'," and was momentarily unable to continue. After a brief apology, saying that she was nervous, she resumed the song and earned jubilant applause at its end.

In August 2025, Smith announced the re-release of her debut album Horses, slated to be released in October 2025 to celebrate the album's 50th anniversary. The album features unreleased tracks, remasters, and original recordings of several songs from the original track list.

== Other ventures ==
=== Art and writings ===
In 1994, Smith began devoting time to what she terms "pure photography", a method of capturing still objects without using a flash. Smith participated in the DVD commentary for Aqua Teen Hunger Force Colon Movie Film for Theaters (2007), alongside Todd Hanson, Dana Snyder, and Fred Armisen. From March 28 to June 22, 2008, the Fondation Cartier pour l'Art Contemporain in Paris hosted a major exhibition of visual artwork titled Land 250, drawn from pieces created by Smith between 1967 and 2007. In 2009, she contributed the introduction to Jessica Lange's book 50 Photographs.

In 2010, Smith's book Just Kids was published, a memoir of her time in Manhattan during the 1970s and her relationship with Robert Mapplethorpe. The book won the National Book Award for Nonfiction later that year.

In 2018, a new edition of Just Kids was published featuring additional photographs and illustrations. Smith also headlined a benefit concert headed by bandmate Tony Shanahan, for Court Tavern in New Brunswick, New Jersey.

In 2011, Smith announced the first museum exhibition of her photography in the U.S., Camera Solo. She named the project after a sign she saw in the abode of Pope Celestine V, which translates as "a room of one's own", and which Smith felt best described her solitary method of photography. The exhibition displayed artifacts that were everyday items or places of significance to artists Smith admires, including Rimbaud, Charles Baudelaire, John Keats, and William Blake. In February 2012, she was a guest at the Sanremo Music Festival. Also in 2011, Smith was working on a crime novel set in London. "I've been working on a detective story that starts at the St Giles in the Fields church in London for the last two years", she told NME, adding that she "loved detective stories" and was a fan of British fictional detective Sherlock Holmes and U.S. crime author Mickey Spillane in her youth.

Smith collaborates with the experimental group Soundwalk Collective on the ongoing project Correspondences. The projects spans more than ten years of work, inspired by different geographies and natural environments. Soundwalk Collective's founder Stephan Crasneanscki has recorded sounds in remote places to uncover traces of history and environmental change, which he later shared with Smith to inspire her poetic response. Their collaboration began after a chance encounter on a plane and developed through ongoing correspondences on life and nature. Correspondences explores themes such as the impact of seismic airguns on the oceans, the resilience of nature after the Chernobyl disaster, the anarchist visions of Peter Kropotkin, and the final landscapes of Pier Paolo Pasolini.

In 2019, she released her book, Year of the Monkey. "A captivating, redemptive chronicle of a year in which Smith looked intently into the abyss", stated Kirkus Reviews. Smith's third memoir, Bread of Angels, was published in November 2025.

=== Film and TV appearances ===
Smith made a cameo appearance in Jean-Luc Godard's Film Socialisme, which was first screened at the Cannes Film Festival in 2010. She made her television acting debut at age 64 on the TV series Law & Order: Criminal Intent, appearing in 2011 episode titled "Icarus".

In 2017, Smith appeared as herself in Song to Song opposite Rooney Mara and Ryan Gosling, directed by Terrence Malick. She later made an appearance at the Detroit show of U2's The Joshua Tree 2017 tour and performed "Mothers of the Disappeared" with the band. Smith's 2018 concert-documentary film Horses: Patti Smith and her Band, premiered at the 2018 Tribeca Film Festival. In addition, Smith narrated Darren Aronofsky's VR experience Spheres: Songs of Spacetime along with Millie Bobby Brown and Jessica Chastain.

In January 2019, Smith's photographs were displayed at the Diego Rivera gallery in the San Francisco Art Institute and she performed at The Fillmore in San Francisco. In 2024, Smith appeared as herself in Turn in the Wound, a documentary by Abel Ferrara about performance, poetry, music and the experience of people at war, focusing on life in Kyiv since the beginning of the Russian invasion of Ukraine. She composed the film's music and contributed poem reading of works by Antonin Artaud, René Daumal and Arthur Rimbaud. It was premiered at the 74th Berlin International Film Festival on February 16, 2024.

=== Politics and activism ===
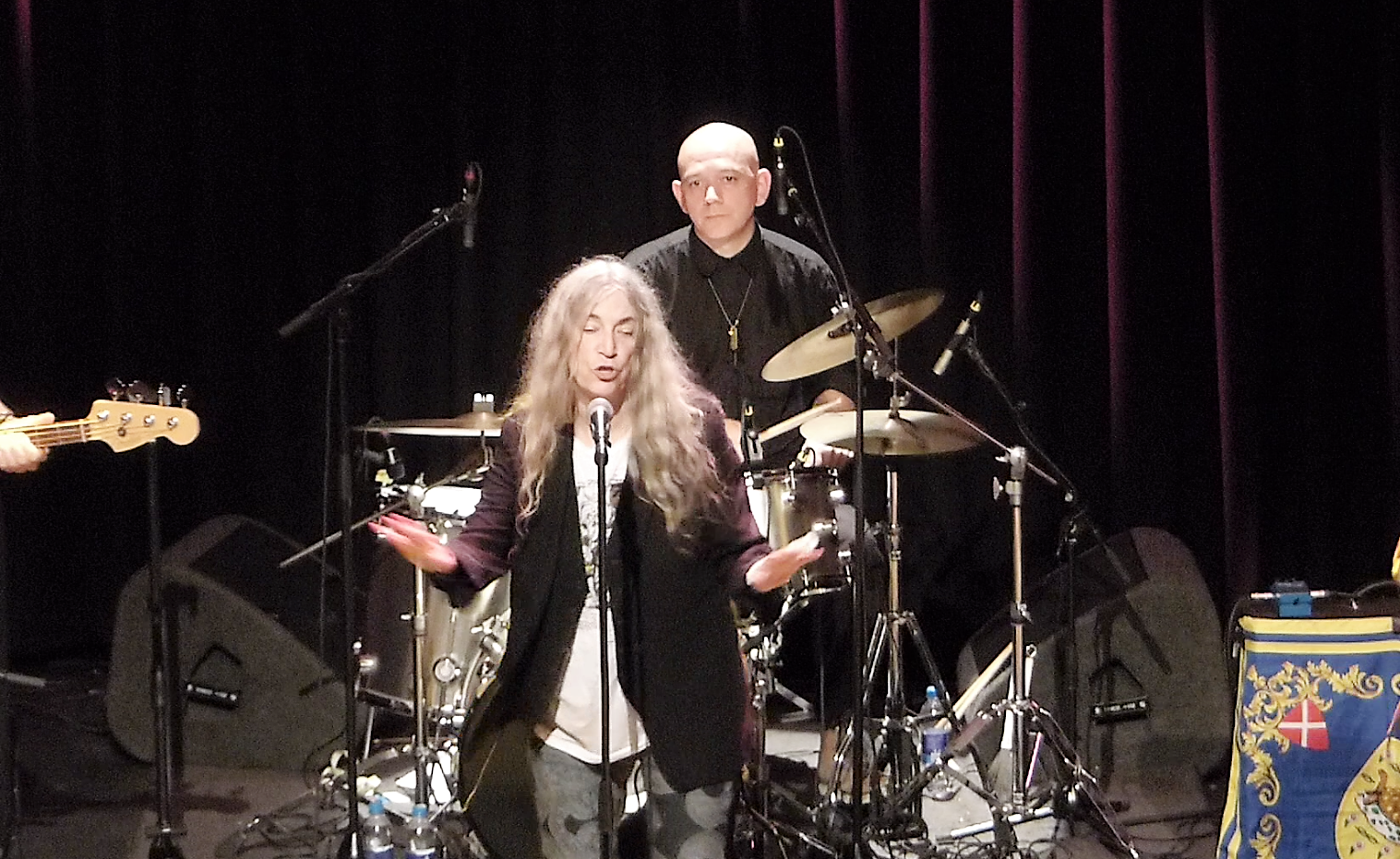
Smith in August 2018

In 1993, Smith contributed "Memorial Tribute (Live)" to the AIDS-benefit album No Alternative.

In the 2000 U.S. presidential election, Smith supported the Green Party and backed Ralph Nader. She led the crowd singing "Over the Rainbow" and "People Have the Power" at the campaign's rallies, and also performed at several of Nader's subsequent "Democracy Rising" events. Smith was a speaker and singer at the first protests against the Iraq War as U.S. President George W. Bush spoke to the United Nations General Assembly. Smith supported Democratic candidate John Kerry in the 2004 election. Bruce Springsteen continued performing her "People Have the Power" at Vote for Change campaign events. In the winter of 2004–05, Smith toured again with Nader in a series of rallies against the Iraq War and called for the impeachment of Bush.

In September 2006, Smith premiered two new protest songs in London. Louise Jury, writing in The Independent, characterized them as "an emotional indictment of American and Israeli foreign policy". The song "Qana" is about the Israeli airstrike on the Lebanese village of Qana. Smith wrote the song "Without Chains" when feeling outraged about injustice against Murat Kurnaz, a Turkish citizen who was born and raised in Germany and held at Guantanamo Bay detainment camp for four years. In a 2009 interview, Smith stated that Kurnaz's family had contacted her and that she wrote a short preface for the book that Murat was writing, which was released in March 2008.

Ten days after the murder of Rachel Corrie in March 2003, Smith performed an anti-war concert at an Austin, Texas venue, and subsequently wrote "Peaceable Kingdom", a song inspired by and dedicated to Corrie. In 2009, in her Meltdown concert in Festival Hall, she paid homage to the Iranians taking part in post-election protests by saying "Where is My Vote?" in a version of the song "People Have the Power".

In 2015, Smith appeared with Nader, spoke and performed the songs "Wing" and "People Have the Power" during the American Museum of Tort Law convocation ceremony in Winsted, Connecticut. In 2016, Smith spoke, read poetry, and performed several songs along with her daughter Jesse at Nader's Breaking Through Power conference at DAR Constitution Hall in Washington, D.C.

A long-time supporter of Tibet House US, Smith performs annually at their benefit at Carnegie Hall.

In 2020, Smith contributed signed first-edition copies of her books to the Passages bookshop in Portland, Oregon after the store's valuable first-edition and other books by various authors were stolen in a burglary. Smith regards climate change as the predominant issue of our time, and she performed at the opening of COP26 in 2021.

In May 2021, Smith signed an open letter calling for a boycott of performances in Israel. During a performance at the Capitol Theatre (Port Chester, New York), she said: "I would be lying if I said I wasn't affected by what is happening in the world", referencing the Russian invasion of Ukraine earlier that day. "This is what I heard in my sleep and goes through my head all day all night long like a tragic hit song. A raw translation of the Ukrainian anthem that the people are singing through defiant tears", she wrote on Instagram on March 6, 2022.

== Legacy ==
Smith's music substantially influenced singers-songwriters and bands throughout late 20th century and 21st century, including Madonna, Todd Rundgren, The Waterboys, Hole, R.E.M.'s Michael Stipe, U2, Maria McKee, Florence Welch, Orville Peck, and Joustene Lorenz. Smith was mentioned in the liner notes of Todd Rundgren 1972 album Something/Anything?, where Rundgren wrote that "Song of the Viking" was "written in the feverish grip of the dreaded 'd'oyle carte,' a chronic disease dating back to my youth. Dedicated to Miss Patti Lee Smith." Seven years later, Rundgren produced the final Patti Smith Group album, Wave. In 1979, Gilda Radner portrayed a character called Candy Slice, based on Smith, on Saturday Night Live. Anglo-Celtic rock band The Waterboys' debut 1983 single, "A Girl Called Johnny", is a tribute to Smith.

Hole's "Violet", song released in 1994, features the lyrics, "And the sky was all violet / I want it again, but violent, more violent," alluding to lyrics from Smith's song "Kimberly". In 2010, Hole singer Courtney Love said that she considered Smith's "Rock N Roll Nigger" the greatest rock song of all time, and credited Smith as a major influence. Love received Smith's album Horses in juvenile hall as a teenager, and "realized that you could do something that was completely subversive that didn't involve violence [or] felonies. I stopped making trouble."

In 1998, Michael Stipe of R.E.M. published a collection of photos, titled Two Times Intro: On the Road with Patti Smith. Stipe sings backing vocals on Smith's "Last Call" and "Glitter in Their Eyes". Smith sang background vocals on R.E.M.'s "E-Bow the Letter" and "Blue". A decade later, in 2008, Stipe said that Smith's album Horses was one of the albums that inspired him to start a punk band.

In 2000, the Australian alternative rock band The Go-Betweens dedicated the song "When She Sang About Angels" on their album The Friends of Rachel Worth to Smith. In 2004, Shirley Manson of Garbage spoke of Smith's influence on her in Rolling Stone's issue "The Immortals: 100 Greatest Artists of All Time", in which Smith was ranked 47th. The Smiths members Morrissey and Johnny Marr share an appreciation for Horses and revealed that their song "The Hand That Rocks the Cradle" is a rework of one of the album's tracks, "Kimberly". In 2004, Sonic Youth released an album called Hidros 3 (to Patti Smith). In 2005, Scottish singer-songwriter KT Tunstall released "Suddenly I See", a single, as a tribute of sorts to Smith. Canadian actor Elliot Page frequently mentions Smith as one of his idols and has done various photo shoots replicating famous Smith photos, and Irish actress Maria Doyle Kennedy often refers to Smith as a major influence. In 2018, the English band Florence and the Machine dedicated the High as Hope album song "Patricia" to Smith. The lyrics reference Smith as Florence Welch's "North Star". Canadian country musician Orville Peck cited Smith as having had a big impact on him, stating that Smith's album Horses introduced him to a new and different way to make music.

In 2008, Patti Smith: Dream of Life, a documentary about Smith by Steven Sebring, was released. In the same year, Rowan University awarded Smith with an honorary doctorate degree for her contributions to popular culture.

== Personal life ==
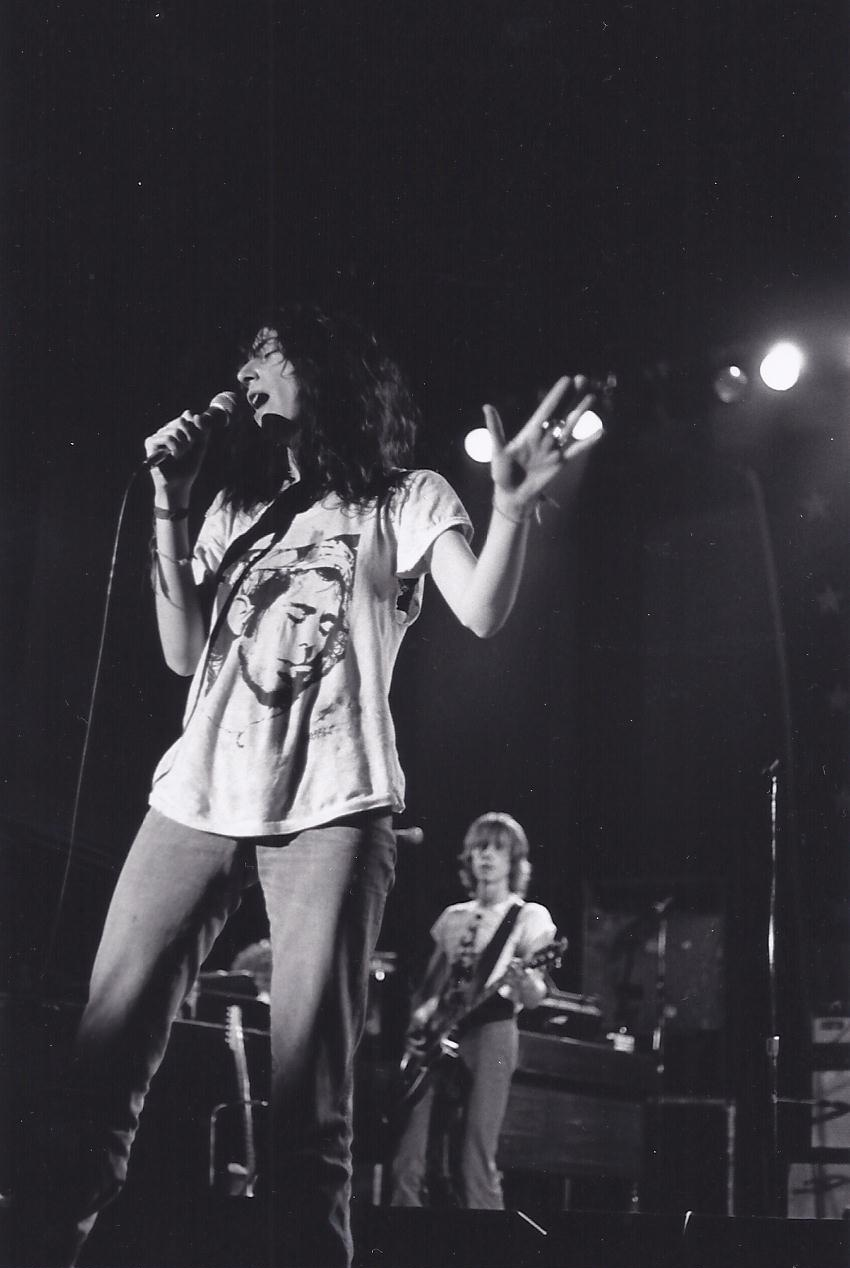
Smith performing at Cornell University in 1978

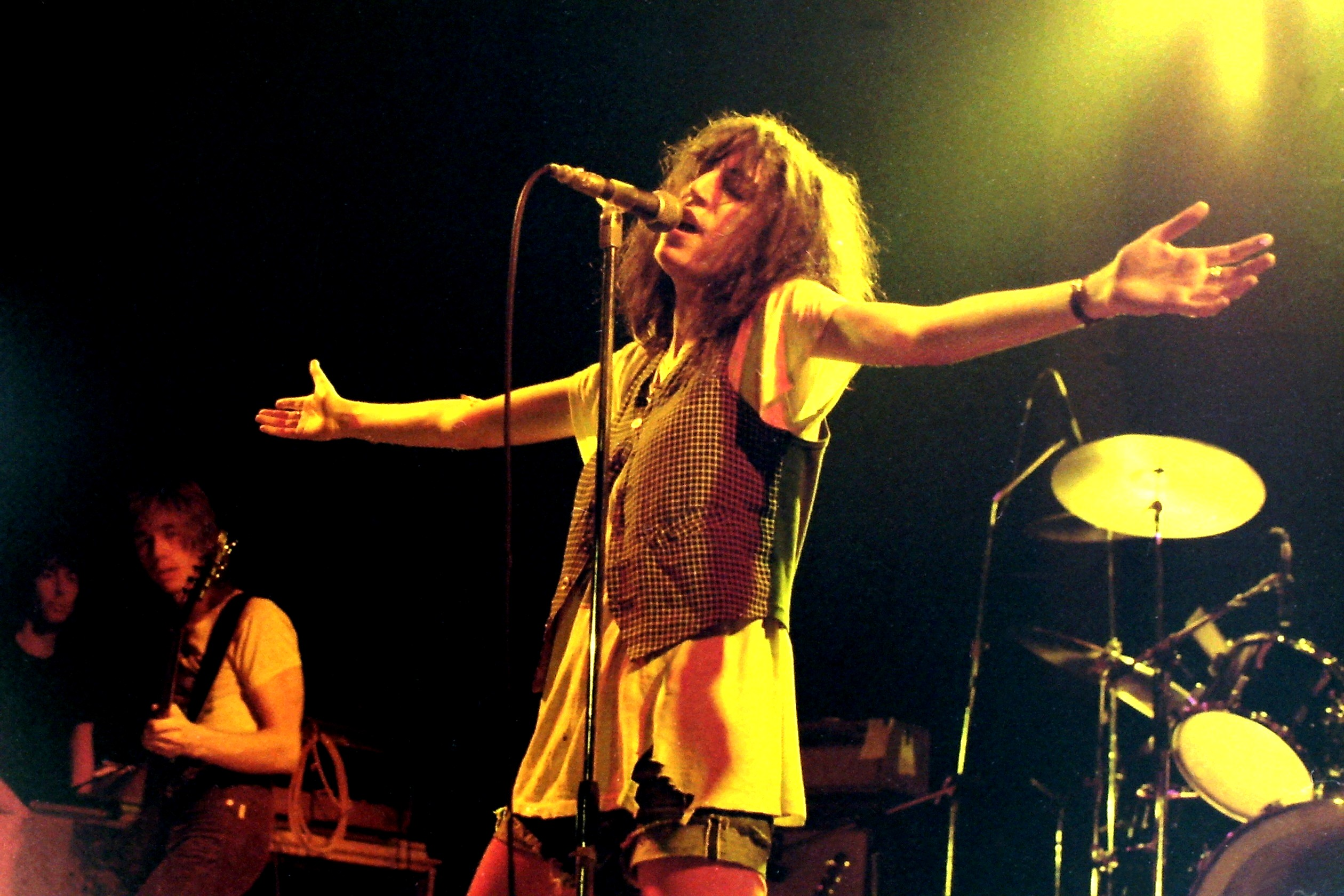
Smith performing in West Germany in 1978

In 1967, 20-year-old Smith left Glassboro State College (now Rowan University) and moved to Manhattan, where she began working at Scribner's bookstore with friend and poet Janet Hamill. On April 26, 1967, at age 20, Smith gave birth to her first child, a daughter, and placed her for adoption.

While working at the bookstore she met photographer Robert Mapplethorpe, with whom she began an intense romantic relationship as they struggled with poverty and Mapplethorpe's sexuality. Smith used Mapplethorpe's photographs as covers for her albums and wrote essays for several of his books, including his posthumous Flowers, at his request. The two remained friends until Mapplethorpe's death in 1989.

Smith considers Mapplethorpe to be among the most influential and important people in her life. She calls him "the artist of my life" in her book Just Kids, which tells the story of their relationship. Her book and album The Coral Sea is an homage to Mapplethorpe.

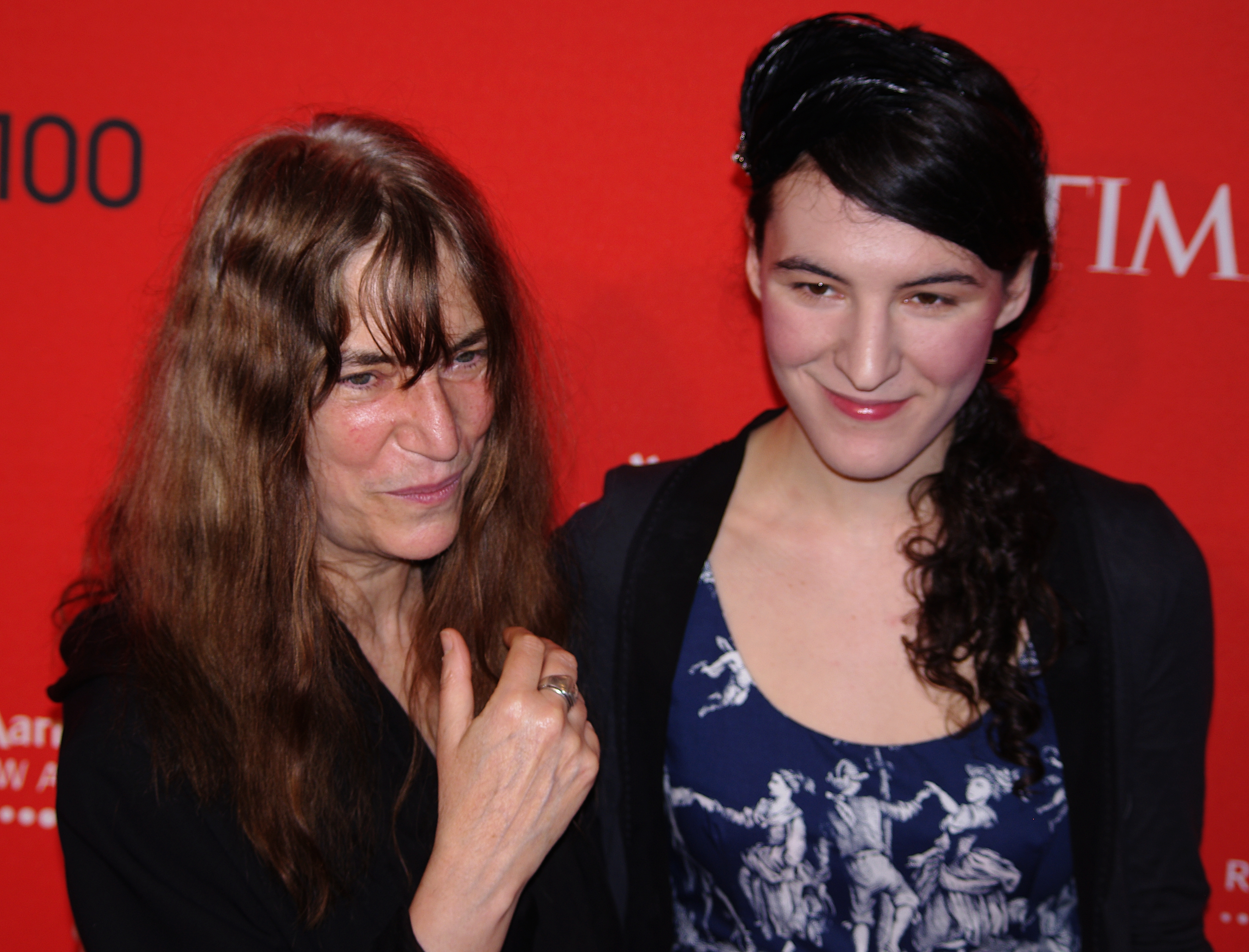
Smith (left) and her daughter Jesse Smith at the Time 100 gala in 2011

In 1974, Smith dated Tom Verlaine, the lead guitarist and songwriter for Television. The couple co-wrote a book of poetry, The Night, with Smith's poems on the odd-numbered pages and Verlaine's on the even ones. A planned follow-up poetry book, to be called Independence Day, was never issued.

In 1979, at approximately age 32, Smith separated from her long-time partner Allen Lanier and met Fred "Sonic" Smith, the former guitar player for Michigan-based rock band MC5 and Sonic's Rendezvous Band. Like Patti, Fred adored poetry. "Dancing Barefoot", which was inspired by Jeanne Hébuterne and her tragic love for Amedeo Modigliani, and "Frederick" were both dedicated to him. A running joke at the time was that she married Fred only because she would not have to change her name. They had a son, Jackson (b. 1982), who went on to marry Meg White, drummer for The White Stripes, from 2009 to 2013, and a daughter, Jesse Paris (b. 1987), who is a musician and composer.

Fred Smith died of a heart attack on November 4, 1994. Shortly afterward, Patti faced the sudden death of her brother Todd.

=== Religion ===
Smith was raised a Jehovah's Witness and had a strong religious upbringing and a Biblical education. She says she left organized religion as a teenager because she found it too confining. This experience inspired her lyrics, "Jesus died for somebody's sins, but not mine", which appear on her cover version of "Gloria" by Them. She has described having an avid interest in Tibetan Buddhism around the age of 11 or 12, saying "I fell in love with Tibet because their essential mission was to keep a continual stream of prayer," but that as an adult she sees clear parallels between different forms of religion and has concluded that religious dogmas are "…man-made laws that you can either decide to abide by or not." She also regarded herself as a Buddhist.

In 2014, she was invited by Pope Francis to play at Vatican Christmas concert. "It's a Christmas concert for the people, and it's being televised. I like Pope Francis and I'm happy to sing for him. Anyone who would confine me to a line from 20 years ago is a fool! I had a strong religious upbringing, and the first word on my first LP is Jesus. I did a lot of thinking. I'm not against Jesus, but I was 20 and I wanted to make my own mistakes and I didn't want anyone dying for me. I stand behind that 20-year-old girl, but I have evolved. I'll sing to my enemy!" she said.

In 2021, she performed at the Vatican again, telling Democracy Now! that she studied Francis of Assisi when Pope Benedict XVI was still the pope. Smith called Francis of Assisi "truly the environmentalist saint" and said that despite not being a Catholic, she had hoped for a pope named Francis.

=== Feminism ===
According to biographer Nick Johnstone, Smith has often been "revered" as a "feminist icon", including by The Guardian journalist Simon Hattenstone in a 2013 profile on the musician.

In 2014, Smith offered her opinion on the sexualization of women in music. "Pop music has always been about the mainstream and what appeals to the public. I don't feel it's my place to judge." Smith has declined to embrace feminism, saying: "I have a son and a daughter, people always talk to me about feminism and women's rights, but I have a son too—I believe in human rights."

In 2015, writer Anwen Crawford observed that Smith's "attitude to genius seems pre-feminist, if not anti-feminist; there is no democratizing, deconstructing impulse in her work. True artists, for Smith, are remote, solitary figures of excellence, wholly dedicated to their art."

== Awards and nominations ==
=== Accolades ===
Award	Year	Nominee(s)	Category	Result	Ref.
ASCAP Pop Music Awards	1995	"Because the Night"	Most Performed Song	Won	
Grammy Awards	1998	"1959"	Best Female Rock Vocal Performance	Nominated	
Grammy Awards	2001	"Glitter in Their Eyes"	Best Female Rock Vocal Performance	Nominated	
Grammy Awards	2016	Blood On Snow (Jo Nesbø)	Best Spoken Word Album	Nominated	
Grammy Awards	2017	M Train	Best Spoken Word Album	Nominated	
Grammy Hall of Fame	2021	Horses	Hall of Fame	Won	

=== Recognitions ===
In July 2005, Smith was named a Commander of the Ordre des Arts et des Lettres by the French Minister of Culture. Smith was inducted into the Rock and Roll Hall of Fame on March 12, 2007. She dedicated her award to the memory of her late husband, Fred, and performed a cover of The Rolling Stones' "Gimme Shelter". As the closing number of the Rock and Roll Hall of Fame Induction Ceremony, Smith's "People Have the Power" was used for the big celebrity jam that traditionally ends the program.

In 2008, Patti Smith: Dream of Life, a documentary about Smith by Steven Sebring, was released. In the same year, Rowan University awarded Smith with an honorary doctorate degree for her contributions to popular culture.

Smith was one of several Polar Music Prize winners in 2011. Smith, along with Yoko Ono and Sandra Bloodworth, was awarded the Jaqueline Kennedy Onassis medal in 2024, given annually to individuals who—through vision, leadership, and philanthropy—have made a lasting contribution to New York City. In 2012, Smith was awarded an honorary doctorate in fine arts from Pratt Institute in Brooklyn. Following conferral of her degree, Smith delivered the commencement address and played two songs along with long-time band member Lenny Kaye. In her Pratt Institute commencement address, Smith said that when she moved to New York City in 1967, she would never have been accepted into Pratt but most of her friends, including Mapplethorpe, were students at Pratt, and she spent countless hours on the Pratt campus. She added that it was through her friends and Pratt professors that she learned many of her own artistic skills.

In November 2020, Smith was set to receive the International Humanities Prize from Washington University in St. Louis in November 2020; however, the ceremony was canceled due to the COVID-19 pandemic. In 2022, she was awarded an Honorary Doctor of Humane Letters from Columbia University. Also in 2022, Smith was named an Officer of the French Legion of Honor (Officier de l'Ordre national de la Légion d'honneur). The award was presented to her at the "Night of Ideas" cultural celebration in Brooklyn, by the French ambassador to the United States, Philippe Étienne.

In 2023, Smith was nominated for induction to the Songwriters Hall of Fame. and was ranked at number 117 on Rolling Stone′s list of the 200 Greatest Singers of All Time. In 2026 she was awarded the Princess of Asturias Award in the category of "Arts". She was also named recipient of the 2026 Harold Washington Literary Award in Chicago.

== Band members ==
=== Current ===
- Patti Smith – vocals, guitar, clarinet (1974–1979, 1988, 1996–present)
- Lenny Kaye – guitar, bass, vocals, keyboards (1974–1979, 1996–present)
- Jackson Smith – guitar (2016–present)
- Tony Shanahan – bass, keyboards, vocals (1996–present)
- Jay Dee Daugherty – drums, keyboards, harmonica, accordion (1975–1979, 1988, 1996–present)

=== Former ===
- Richard Sohl – keyboards (1974–1977, 1979, 1988; died 1990)
- Ivan Král – bass guitar, guitar, vocals, keyboards (1975–1979; died 2020)
- Bruce Brody – keyboards (1977–1978)
- Fred "Sonic" Smith – guitar (1988; died 1994)
- Kasim Sulton – bass guitar (1988)
- Oliver Ray – guitar (1996–2005)
- Jack Petruzzelli – guitar (2006–2016)

== Discography ==
Solo studio albums

- Horses (1975)
- Dream of Life (1988)
- Gone Again (1996)
- Peace and Noise (1997)
- Gung Ho (2000)
- Trampin' (2004)
- Twelve (2007)
- Banga (2012)

With Patti Smith Group

- Radio Ethiopia (1976)
- Easter (1978)
- Wave (1979) (Note: Wave was credited to both Patti Smith and Patti Smith Group on some releases.)

== Bibliography ==
=== Books ===
- Cowboy Mouth (1971) play co-written with Sam Shepard
- Seventh Heaven (1972)
- Early Morning Dream (1972)
- A Useless Death (1972)
- Witt (1973)
- The Night (1976) poems with Tom Verlaine
- Ha! Ha! Houdini! (1977)
- Babel (1978)
- Canzoni (1979)
- Poesie rock [Witt, The Night, Ha! Ha! Houdini] (1980)
- Woolgathering (1992)
- Early Work (1994)
- The Coral Sea (1996)
- Patti Smith Complete (1998)
- Possession Obsession: Andy Warhol And Collecting (2002)
- Strange Messenger (2003)
- Auguries of Innocence (2005)
- Poems (Vintage Classics) by William Blake.
  Edited by and with introduction by Patti Smith (2007)
- Land 250 (2008)
- Trois (2008)
- Great Lyricists; foreword by Rick Moody (2008)
- Just Kids (2010)
- Camera Solo (2011)
- Work Songs (2011)
- Hecatomb (2014); with 20 drawings by Jose Antonio Suarez Londono
- Patti Smith Collected Lyrics, 1970-2015 (2015)
- Come on Get Higher (2015)
- M Train (2015) (Note: Ulin, David L. "Review: Patti Smith's M Train reckons with life, while Collected Lyrics shows her living energy as words; ", Los Angeles Times, October 1, 2015. Retrieved October 7, 2015.)
- Devotion (2017) (Note: Devotion. Why I Write. New Haven, Conn.: Yale University Press. 2017. ISBN 9780300218626. OCLC 989978146. Archived from the original on September 1, 2017. Devotion at Google Books)
- Tańczę boso (2017)
- The New Jerusalem (2018)
- Just Kids (Illustrated edition) (2018)
- At the Minetta Lane (2018)
- Year of the Monkey (2019)
- A Book of Days (2022)
- Patti Smith Group, Live in Zurich, October 1976 (2025)
- Bread of Angels: A Memoir (2025)

=== Essays and reporting ===
- Smith, Patti (February 13–20, 2023). "Tom Verlaine". The Talk of the Town. Postscript. The New Yorker. 99 (1): 17. (Note: Online version is titled "He was Tom Verlaine".)

== See also ==
- List of American Grammy Award winners and nominees
