= Fred "Sonic" Smith =

American guitarist (1948–1994)

Background information
- Born: Frederick Dewey Smith; September 14, 1948; Lincoln County, West Virginia, U.S.
- Died: November 4, 1994 (aged 46) Detroit, Michigan, U.S.
- Genres: Garage rock; hard rock; psychedelic rock; proto-punk
- Occupations: Musician; songwriter
- Instruments: Guitar; bass; vocals
- Years active: 1963–1988
- Spouse(s): Sigrid Dobat (m. 1969; div. 1980) Patti Smith (m. 1980, death)
- Website: sonicsrendezvousband.net

Frederick Dewey Smith (September 14, 1948 – November 4, 1994), known professionally as Fred "Sonic" Smith, was an American guitarist and member of the rock band MC5. He married and raised two children with poet and fellow rock musician Patti Smith. The couple also collaborated musically.

== Early life ==
Frederick Dewey Smith was born on September 14, 1948 (Note: Some sources show 1949 as Smith's year of birth.) at his family's residence on Broad Branch in the Big Harts Creek area of Lincoln County, West Virginia.

== Career ==
Known professionally as Fred "Sonic" Smith, he was a guitarist with the MC5 and later went on to form Sonic's Rendezvous Band, which released one single, "City Slang", during Smith's lifetime.

In 1988 he collaborated with wife Patti Smith on her album Dream of Life.

In 2018, Smith was inducted into the West Virginia Music Hall of Fame alongside Hasil Adkins and Ann Magnuson.

In 2024, the MC5 were inducted into the Rock & Roll Hame of Fame, receiving the Musical Excellence Award.

== Influence and legacy ==
In 2003, Rolling Stone magazine ranked Smith #93 in its list of The 100 Greatest Guitarists of All Time.

Patti Smith has spoken of how Fred Smith encouraged her writing, crediting his influence on a number of the songs she released after his death, as well as the prose works she created during their time together in Michigan. He was the inspiration for her song "Frederick", a single from her 1979 album Wave. Her 1996 album Gone Again features several songs inspired by, co-written by, or in tribute to, her late husband.

The band Sonic Youth took its name from Smith's nickname.

Inducted into West Virginia Music Hall of Fame 2018. Award given by Lenny Kaye and accepted by Patti Smith, Jesse Smith and Jackson Smith.

== Personal life ==
Smith married German-born artist Sigrid Dobat in 1969. The marriage ended before or in 1980.

On March 9, 1976, Patti Smith's guitarist, Lenny Kaye, introduced Fred and Patti at Lafayette Coney Island in Detroit, as Patti wrote about in her book Bread of Angels. The two subsequently married in 1980. They had two children together, a son, Jackson, and a daughter, Jesse. Jackson, a guitarist, later married Meg White, formerly of the indie band The White Stripes.

== Death ==
On November 4, 1994, Fred Smith died of heart failure in Detroit, at age 46.

== Musical equipment ==
Guitars

- Rickenbacker 450 with Gibson PAF pickups
- Epiphone Crestwood
- Mosrite Guitars
- Gretsch Country Gentleman
- Fender Duo-Sonic

Amplification

- Marshall Amplifier
- Fender Super Reverb
