= Deaths in June 2020 =

The following is a list of notable deaths in June 2020.

Entries for each day are listed alphabetically by surname. A typical entry lists information in the following sequence:

- Name, age, country of citizenship at birth, subsequent country of citizenship (if applicable), reason for notability, cause of death (if known), and reference.

== June 2020 ==
=== 1 ===
- Javier Alva Orlandini, 92, Peruvian politician, Vice President (1980–1985), President of the Senate (1981–1982).
- Jean-Michel Cadiot, 67, French writer and journalist.
- Silver Donald Cameron, 82, Canadian journalist and author.
- Garth Dawley, 86, Canadian journalist, amyotrophic lateral sclerosis.
- Pat Dye, 80, American Hall of Fame college football player (Georgia Bulldogs), athletic director and coach (East Carolina Pirates, Auburn Tigers).
- Asif Farrukhi, 60, Pakistani writer.
- Majek Fashek, 57, Nigerian reggae singer and songwriter.
- Marian Filar, 77, Polish lawyer, academic and politician, member of the Sejm (2007–2011).
- Helmut Gerlach, 82, German Olympic cross-country skier.
- Lee Grosscup, 83, American football player (New York Giants) and broadcaster (ABC).
- John Hartigan, 80, American Olympic rower (1968), respiratory failure.
- Bill Hill, 84, American Canadian football player (Edmonton Eskimos).
- Joey Image, 63, American drummer (Misfits), liver cancer.
- Janez Kocijančič, 78, Slovenian politician and lawyer, Deputy (1993–1996).
- K. N. Lakshmanan, 89, Indian politician, Tamil Nadu MLA (since 2001).
- Ron Larrieu, 83, American Olympic athlete (1964).
- Daniel Levy, 89, Israeli Olympic basketball player (1952).
- Colin Manlove, 78, Scottish literary critic and editor.
- David McAtee, 53, American barbecue stand owner, shot.
- Roberto Peccei, 78, Italian physicist, co-formulator of the Peccei–Quinn theory.
- Giyannedra Prasad, 60, Fijian lawyer and politician, member and Deputy Speaker of Parliament (1999–2000), cancer.
- Nicolas Rea, 3rd Baron Rea, 91, British hereditary peer and politician.
- Piotr Rocki, 46, Polish footballer (Polonia Warsaw, Górnik Zabrze, Dyskobolia Grodzisk Wielkopolski), ruptured aneurysm.
- Douglas Rolfe, 67, Australian cricketer (Victoria, South Australia).
- Pedro Ercílio Simon, 78, Brazilian Roman Catholic prelate, Archbishop of Passo Fundo (2011–2012) and Bishop of Uruguaiana (1995–1998).
- Myroslav Skoryk, 81, Ukrainian composer.
- Josef Smolka, 81, Czech volleyball player, Olympic bronze medalist (1968).
- Christoph Sydow, 35, German journalist (Der Spiegel), suicide.
- Clifford Wetmore, 85, American lichenologist, metastatic prostate cancer.
- Marion Zarzeczna, 89, American pianist.

=== 2 ===
- Arrogate, 7, American Thoroughbred racehorse, Breeders' Cup Classic winner (2016) and American Champion Three-Year-Old Male Horse (2016), euthanized.
- Brad Babcock, 81, American college baseball coach (James Madison).
- Ghulam Murtaza Baloch, 55, Pakistani politician, member of the Provincial Assembly of Sindh (since 2016), COVID-19.
- Werner Böhm, 78, German singer and musician.
- Geoffrey Burnstock, 91, English-born Australian neuroscientist.
- Jono Clarke, 76, Zimbabwean cricketer (Rhodesia).
- Hiber Conteris, 86, Uruguayan writer, playwright, and literary critic.
- John Cuneo, 91, Australian sailor, Olympic champion (1972).
- David Dorn, 77, American police officer, shot.
- James F. English Jr., 93, American bank executive (Connecticut Bank and Trust Company) and academic administrator, president of Trinity College (Connecticut) (1981–1989).
- Paolo Fabbri, 81, Italian semiotician.
- Lugi Gizenga, 54, Congolese politician.
- Roberto Gervaso, 82, Italian writer and journalist, cancer.
- Mary Pat Gleason, 70, American actress (Guiding Light, A Cinderella Story, Mom), Emmy winner (1986), cancer.
- Gerald Jay Goldberg, 90, American author.
- Jean-Claude Hamel, 90, French football executive, President of Auxerre (1963–2009).
- Gaynel Hodge, 83, American doo-wop singer (The Platters), pianist and songwriter ("Earth Angel").
- Leslie Kay, 98, British-born New Zealand electrical engineer and academic.
- Rusty Kidd, 74, American politician, member of the Georgia House of Representatives (2009–2017).
- Yvon Lamarre, 85, Canadian politician.
- John Luk Jok, 68, South Sudanese politician, Minister of Justice (2011–2013).
- Henadz Mardas, 49, Belarusian footballer (Neman Grodno, BATE Borisov), bowel cancer.
- Sean Monterrosa, 22, American protester, shot.
- Des Moore, 94, Australian Roman Catholic prelate, Bishop of Alotau-Sideia (1970–2001).
- Jacques Noyer, 93, French Roman Catholic prelate, Bishop of Amiens (1987–2003).
- Munir Khan Orakzai, 60, Pakistani politician, MP (2002–2013, since 2018), heart attack.
- Jean Pineau, 97, French politician, Deputy (1978–1981).
- Janine Reiss, 99, French vocal coach and harpsichordist.
- Muriel Kent Roy, 98, Canadian demographer.
- Riaz Sheikh, 51, Pakistani cricketer (Pakistan National Shipping Corporation).
- Héctor Suárez, 81, Mexican actor (National Mechanics, El buscabullas, El derecho de nacer) and comedian.
- Lindsay Townsend, 86, New Zealand rugby union player (Otago, national team).
- Chris Trousdale, 34, American actor and singer (Dream Street), COVID-19.
- Carlo Ubbiali, 90, Italian motorcycle road racer, nine-time world champion, respiratory failure.
- Wes Unseld, 74, American Hall of Fame basketball player and coach (Washington Bullets), pneumonia.
- Floyd Zaiger, 94, American fruit breeder.

=== 3 ===
- Atta Muhammad Bhanbhro, 84, Pakistani writer and translator.
- Oscar Brown, 74, American baseball player (Atlanta Braves).
- Shaukat Manzoor Cheema, 66, Pakistani politician, Punjab MPA (since 2008), COVID-19.
- Abdelmalek Droukdel, 50, Algerian Islamic militant, founder of Al-Qaeda in the Islamic Maghreb, shot.
- Bob Dupuis, 84, American ice hockey player (Boston University Terriers).
- Bruce Jay Friedman, 90, American author and screenwriter (Splash, Doctor Detroit, Stir Crazy).
- Jeanne Goosen, 81, South African writer.
- Marc de Hond, 42, Dutch television presenter and wheelchair basketball player, cancer.
- Mohsen Ibrahim, 85, Lebanese politician.
- Mian Jamshed Uddin Kakakhel, 65, Pakistani politician, Khyber Pakhtunkhwa MPA (since 2018), COVID-19.
- István Kausz, 87, Hungarian fencer, Olympic champion (1964).
- Veli Lehtelä, 84, Finnish rower, Olympic bronze medalist (1956, 1960).
- Jerzy Łukaszewski, 95, Polish diplomat and academic.
- Donald Macgregor, 81, Scottish Olympic runner (1972).
- Johnny Majors, 85, American Hall of Fame football player (Tennessee Volunteers) and coach (Pitt Panthers, Iowa State Cyclones), national championship (1976).
- Héctor Ortega, 81, Mexican actor (Las fuerzas vivas, Santa sangre, Lucía, Lucía).
- Pleasantly Perfect, 22, American racehorse and sire, Breeders' Cup Classic (2003) and Dubai World Cup (2004) winner.
- Gary Potts, 75, Canadian Temagami First Nation chief.
- Tony Romandini, 91, Canadian jazz guitarist and composer.
- Adriano Silva, 49, Brazilian politician, complications from COVID-19.
- Pritam Singh, 78, Indian academic.
- Mário Rino Sivieri, 78, Italian-born Brazilian Roman Catholic prelate, Bishop of Propriá (1997–2017).
- Sheikh Tahir Rasheed, 66, Pakistani politician, MP (1993–1999) and Punjab MPA (1990–1993), liver cancer.
- Valentina Tăzlăuanu, 70, Moldovan essayist, journalist and theatre critic.
- Maria Alice Vergueiro, 85, Brazilian actress (O Corpo, Cronicamente Inviável), pneumonia.
- Larry Walsh, 72, American politician, member of the Illinois State Senate (1997–2005), prostate cancer.
- Midge Ware, 92, American actress (Gunslinger, The Phil Silvers Show).
- Ray Webster, 82, American baseball player (Cleveland Indians, Boston Red Sox).
- Conrad Worrill, 78, American writer and political activist.

=== 4 ===
- Marcello Abbado, 93, Italian pianist and composer.
- Earl Brown, 92, American lieutenant general.
- Ralph Caplan, 95, American design consultant and writer.
- Basu Chatterjee, 93, Indian film director (Us Paar, Piya Ka Ghar, Chameli Ki Shaadi).
- Max Clendinning, 95, Northern Irish furniture designer and architect.
- Walt Elliot, 86, Canadian politician.
- Esther Eskens, 95, American politician.
- Kathryn Hach-Darrow, 97, American businesswoman.
- Laura Hillman, 96, German-born American Holocaust survivor.
- Rupert Hine, 72, English musician (Quantum Jump), songwriter and record producer (The Fixx, Howard Jones), cancer.
- Mikhail Kokshenov, 83, Russian actor (Zhenya, Zhenechka and Katyusha, The Garage, Sportloto-82), film director and producer.
- Pieter van der Kruk, 78, Dutch Olympic weightlifter (1968) and shot putter.
- Jean Link, 80, Luxembourgish Olympic fencer (1960).
- Bobby Locke, 86, American baseball player (Cleveland Indians, Philadelphia Phillies).
- Roberto Faraone Mennella, 48, Italian jewelry designer, cancer.
- Dulce Nunes, 90, Brazilian artist, composer, singer and music producer, COVID-19.
- Bamidele Olumilua, 80, Nigerian politician, Governor of Ondo State (1992–1993).
- Steve Priest, 72, British musician (The Sweet) and songwriter ("Fox on the Run").
- James P. Quirk, 93, American economist.
- Pete Rademacher, 91, American boxer, Olympic champion (1956).
- Antonio Rodríguez de las Heras, 72, Spanish historian and academic, COVID-19.
- Don E. Schultz, 86, American marketing theorist and professor.
- Albert N. Whiting, 102, American academic administrator, President of North Carolina Central University (1966–1983).

=== 5 ===
- Howard Allen, 71, American serial killer.
- Deborah Washington Brown, 68, American computer scientist.
- Andrée Champagne, 80, Canadian actress (Les Belles Histoires des pays d'en haut) and politician, MP (1984–1993, 2005–2014).
- Jonathan Dowling, 65, Irish-American theoretical physicist.
- Jim Fryatt, 79, English footballer (Bradford Park Avenue, Oldham Athletic, Southport).
- Boris Gaganelov, 78, Bulgarian football player (Belasita Petrich, CSKA Sofia, national team) and manager.
- Doris Goodale, 71, American politician, member of the Arizona House of Representatives (2009–2015).
- Jiří Hanák, 82, Czech journalist and dissident, Charter 77 signatory.
- Rosemary Hollis, 68, British political scientist.
- A. Dale Kaiser, 92, American biochemist and developmental biologist, complications from Parkinson's disease.
- Tomisaku Kawasaki, 95, Japanese pediatrician, discoverer of Kawasaki disease.
- Vilhelm Kraus, 71, Bulgarian politician, Minister of Transport (1997–1999).
- Carlos Lessa, 83, Brazilian economist, COVID-19.
- Kristin Linklater, 84, Scottish actress, acting and vocal coach.
- Ved Marwah, 85, Indian police officer, governor of Mizoram (2000–2001), Manipur (1999–2003) and Jharkhand (2000–2004).
- John Miller, 79, American baseball player (Baltimore Orioles), heart failure.
- James Albert Murray, 87, American Roman Catholic prelate, Bishop of Kalamazoo (1998–2009).
- George V. Murry, 71, American Roman Catholic prelate, Bishop of Saint Thomas (1999–2007) and Youngstown (since 2007), leukemia.
- Betty Ann Norton, 83, Irish acting teacher.
- Mary Overlie, 74, American choreographer, dancer and writer (the Six Viewpoints).
- Ko Si-chi, 90, Taiwanese photographer.
- Friedrich Stelzner, 98, German surgeon and educator.
- Kurt Thomas, 64, American Hall of Fame gymnast, world champion (1978, 1979), complications from basilar stroke.
- Ron Thompson, 88, English footballer (Carlisle United), bowel cancer.
- Marian Tomaszewski, 97, Polish scout leader, officer and tank commander (2nd Polish Corps).
- Vicki Wood, 101, American racing driver (NASCAR).
- Xu Sihai, 74, Chinese teapot creator and collector, expert on purple Yixing clay teapots, founder of the Sihai Teapot Museum.
- Shigeru Yokota, 87, Japanese author and human rights activist, founder of National Association for the Rescue of Japanese Kidnapped by North Korea.

=== 6 ===
- Clayton Bailey, 81, American artist.
- Arthur Berman, 85, American politician, member of the Illinois House of Representatives (1969–1976) and Senate (1977–2000).
- Marina Blagojević, 62, Serbian sociologist.
- Jean-Marie Bourgeois, 80, French Olympic skier (1968).
- Reche Caldwell, 41, American football player (San Diego Chargers, New England Patriots, Washington Redskins), shot.
- Jean-Marc Chaput, 89, Canadian author and public speaker, bone cancer.
- Dan Danglo, 95, American cartoonist (Felix the Cat).
- Earl Davie, 93, American biochemist.
- Christel DeHaan, 77, German-born American timeshare exchange executive and philanthropist, founder of RCI and Christel House International.
- Milt Earnhart, 102, American politician, member of the Arkansas House of Representatives (1959–1966) and Senate (1967–1980).
- Alain Erlande-Brandenburg, 82, French art historian.
- Allan Evans, 64, American record producer and musicologist.
- Corey Fischer, 75, American actor (M*A*S*H, Brewster McCloud, McCabe & Mrs. Miller), complications from a brain aneurysm.
- Thomas Freeman, 100, American educator and debate coach.
- Uttam Gada, 72, Indian screenwriter and playwright, chronic lymphocytic leukemia.
- Chandrakanta Goyal, 88, Indian politician, Maharashtra MLA (1990–1995).
- Hsu Kun-yuan, 63, Taiwanese politician, speaker of the Kaohsiung City Council (since 2018), suicide by jumping.
- Marjan, 72, Iranian singer and actress.
- Jordi Mestre, 38, Spanish actor (Sé lo que hicisteis...) and model, traffic collision.
- Bill Oster, 87, American baseball player (Philadelphia Athletics).
- Zambrose Abdul Rahman, 76, Malaysian Olympic hurdler (1968).
- Bill Reams, 87, American politician.
- Lester Ryan, 61, Irish hurler (Clara, Kilkenny), traffic collision.
- T. Terrell Sessums, 89, American politician, member (1963–1974) and speaker (1972–1974) of the Florida House of Representatives.
- Dietmar Seyferth, 91, German-born American chemist, complications from COVID-19.
- Eduard Shaihullin, 45, Russian motorcycle speedway rider.
- Ramadan Shalah, 62, Palestinian Islamic militant, Secretary-general of the Islamic Jihad Movement in Palestine (1995–2018), complications from heart surgery.
- Francesco Squillace, 94, Italian lawyer and politician, president of the Province of Catanzaro (1975).
- Malcolm Terris, 79, English actor (When the Boat Comes In, Coronation Street, The Plague Dogs).
- Jayamohan Thampi, 64, Indian cricketer (Kerala).
- Andrea Veggio, 96, Italian Roman Catholic prelate, Auxiliary Bishop of Verona (1983–2001).
- Constantin Xenakis, 88, Egyptian-born Greek painter.
- John Zook, 72, American football player (Atlanta Falcons, St. Louis Cardinals), cancer.

=== 7 ===
- Sir Michael Beavis, 90, British Royal Air Force officer.
- Frank Bey, 74, American blues singer.
- Jean Bolinder, 84, Swedish author.
- Paul Boundoukou-Latha, 67, Gabonese diplomat and politician.
- Hubert Gagnon, 73, Canadian actor (Nic and Pic) and voice dubber (Homer Simpson), cancer.
- Józef Gruszka, 73, Polish politician, member of the Sejm (1993–2005) and chairman of the PKN Orlen investigation commission (2004–2005).
- Martin Hattersley, British-born Canadian lawyer.
- Bettina Heinen-Ayech, 82, German painter.
- Denis Howe, 91, English football (Southend United, Darlington, West Ham United).
- Doris Jones-Baker, 94, British-American historian and folklorist.
- Floyd Lee, 86, American blues musician (Music Under New York), heart failure.
- Paul Lombard, 92, French politician, mayor of Martigues (1968–2009).
- Péter Marót, 75, Hungarian fencer, Olympic silver medallist (1972), traffic collision.
- Oliver McGee, 62, American political analyst and strategist.
- James D. Meindl, 87, American engineer.
- Alan Metter, 77, American film director (Back to School, Girls Just Want to Have Fun), heart attack.
- Ken Riley, 72, American football player (Cincinnati Bengals) and coach (Florida A&M Rattlers), heart attack.
- Paul Rochester, 81, American football player (New York Jets, Dallas Texans), Super Bowl champion (1969).
- Roger Saint-Vil, 70, Haitian footballer (Racing CH, Cincinnati Comets, national team).
- Chiranjeevi Sarja, 39, Indian actor (Vayuputra, Varadhanayaka, Aatagara), heart attack.
- Lynika Strozier, 35, American biologist and researcher, COVID-19.
- Edith Thallaug, 90, Norwegian actress and operatic singer.
- Ralph Wright, 72, English footballer (Bolton Wanderers, New York Cosmos, Miami Toros).

=== 8 ===
- Alex Aurrichio, 30, American-born Australian footballer, traffic collision.
- Klaus Berger, 79, German academic theologian.
- Tobias Berggren, 80, Swedish poet.
- Renzo Bulgarello, 72, Italian Olympic rower (1972).
- R. L. Clark, 89, American politician, member of the North Carolina Senate (1995–1998).
- Nicholas Cummings, 95, American psychologist and author.
- Tony Dunne, 78, Irish football player (Manchester United, Bolton Wanderers, national team) and manager.
- Manuel Felguérez, 91, Mexican abstract artist (Generación de la Ruptura), COVID-19.
- Maggie Fitzgibbon, 91, Australian actress (Sunstruck).
- James Hand, 67, American country music singer-songwriter.
- Marion Hänsel, 71, French-born Belgian film director and screenwriter (Between the Devil and the Deep Blue Sea).
- G. C. Jennings, 81, American politician, member of the Virginia House of Delegates (1982–1994).
- Sedley Joseph, 80, Trinidadian footballer (national team), kidney disease.
- Stan London, 94, American physician (St. Louis Cardinals).
- Fabrizio Mioni, 89, Italian actor (Roland the Mighty, Hercules).
- José Alberto Tavares Moreira, 75, Portuguese economist, governor of the Bank of Portugal (1986–1992), cancer.
- Sardar Dur Muhammad Nasir, 61, Pakistani politician, Balochistan MPA (2013–2018), COVID-19.
- Pierre Nkurunziza, 55, Burundian politician, President (since 2005), heart attack.
- Oliver Ongtawco, 78, Filipino bowler, heart attack.
- Bonnie Pointer, 69, American singer (The Pointer Sisters) and songwriter ("Fairytale", "How Long (Betcha' Got a Chick on the Side)"), cardiac arrest.
- Arjun Charan Sethi, 79, Indian politician, MP (1971–1977, 1980–1984, 1991–1996, since 1998).
- Daniel Stolper, 85, American oboist.
- Heli Susi, 90, Estonian teacher and translator.
- Ian Taylor, 64, British commodity trading executive, chairman and CEO of Vitol, pneumonia.
- Shim Wan-koo, 81, South Korean politician, MP (1985–1992) and mayor of Ulsan (1997–2002).
- Stefan Vodenicharov, 75, Bulgarian academic, President of the Bulgarian Academy of Sciences (2012–2016) and Minister of Education (2013).

=== 9 ===
- Parviz Aboutaleb, 78, Iranian football player (Rah Ahan, Esteghlal) and manager (national team), complications from Alzheimer's disease.
- Joseph Mohsen Béchara, 85, Lebanese Maronite Catholic hierarch, Archbishop of Cyprus (1986–1988) and Antelias (1988–2012).
- Stephen Blizzard, 91, Canadian pilot and physician.
- Paul Chapman, 66, Welsh rock guitarist (UFO, Lone Star).
- Pau Donés, 53, Spanish singer-songwriter (Jarabe de Palo) and guitarist, cancer.
- Michael Drosnin, 74, American author and journalist.
- Anthony Obiagboso Enukeme, 76, Nigerian politician.
- Tom Feamster, 89, American football player (Baltimore Colts).
- Ödön Földessy, 90, Hungarian long jumper, Olympic bronze medallist (1952).
- Kasirye Ggwanga, 68, Ugandan military officer, complications from brain surgery.
- Simon Henshaw, 59, American diplomat, Ambassador to Guinea (since 2019).
- Dick Johnson, 66, American news reporter (WMAQ-TV).
- Noel Johnson, 47 American college basketball coach (Midwestern State), ovarian cancer.
- Ain Kaalep, 94, Estonian writer and poet.
- Kim Chang-sop, 74, North Korean politician, Vice Minister of the State Security Department (since 2015).
- Nemir Kirdar, 83, Iraqi-British investment banker and financier, founder of Investcorp.
- Krystyna Krupska-Wysocka, 84, Polish film director.
- Francis Lagan, 85, Irish Roman Catholic prelate, Auxiliary Bishop of Derry (1988–2010).
- Gwen Margolis, 85, American politician, member (1980–1992, 2002–2008, 2010–2016) and president (1990–1992) of the Florida Senate.
- Chrysostomos P. Panayiotopoulos, 82, Greek neurologist, heart attack.
- Jean-Philippe Reverdot, 67, French photographer.
- William Russell Robinson, 78, American politician, member of the Pennsylvania House of Representatives (1989–2002).
- Jeanne Rynhart, 74, Irish sculptor.
- Ajay Singh Chahar, 69, Indian diplomat and politician.
- Wang Dingguo, 108, Chinese politician, member of the Political Consultative Conference (1978–1993).
- Jas Waters, 39, American television writer (This Is Us, Kidding) and columnist (Vibe), suicide by hanging.
- Josh White, 43, American football player.
- Walter Wilczynski, 67, American ethologist and neuroscientist.
- Adam Wodnicki, 89, Polish translator and writer.

=== 10 ===
- J. Anbazhagan, 62, Indian politician, MLA (2001–2006, since 2011), COVID-19.
- Duilio Arigoni, 91, Swiss chemist.
- Michel Bellen, 74, Belgian serial killer, heart failure.
- Jesse Blackadder, 56, Australian novelist, screenwriter and journalist, pancreatic cancer.
- Aloysius G. Casey, 88, American lieutenant general.
- Justin Champion, 59, British historian.
- Hans Cieslarczyk, 83, German football player (Borussia Dortmund, national team) and manager (SpVgg Fürth).
- Joan Ferner, 87, Canadian-born New Zealand women's rights advocate.
- Rosita Fornés, 97, Cuban-American actress (Musical Romance, The Unknown Mariachi) and singer, complications from emphysema.
- Charlotte Gardner, 88, American politician, member of the North Carolina House of Representatives (1985–2001).
- Harry Glickman, 96, American Hall of Fame sports executive (Portland Trail Blazers) and journalist (The Oregonian).
- Antonio González Orozco, 87, Mexican muralist, cancer.
- William Hale, 88, American film and television director (Gunfight in Abilene, Red Alert, Murder in Texas).
- Murray Hill, 80, New Zealand seed technologist.
- James Holland, 81, American politician, member of the New Hampshire House of Representatives (1975–1977).
- Paul Johnson, 53, Canadian wheelchair tennis player and Paralympic athlete (1988).
- Tom Keeping, 78, Canadian politician.
- Dorothy Kovalchick, 94, American baseball player (Fort Wayne Daisies).
- Anita Linda, 95, Filipino actress (Weighed But Found Wanting, Jaguar, Temptation Island).
- Elizabeth-Ann de Massy, 73, Monegasque aristocrat.
- Fred McIlhattan, 75, American politician, heart attack.
- Hans Mezger, 90, German automotive engineer (Porsche).
- Miliky MiCool, 53, Ghanaian actress, complications from high blood pressure.
- Mr. Wrestling II, 85, American professional wrestler (GCW, Mid-South, CWF).
- Murray Olderman, 98, American sports columnist, cartoonist and author.
- Paul Owen, 51, Canadian cricketer (Gloucestershire).
- Talat Özkarslı, 82, Turkish football player (Galatasaray, national team) and manager (Gaziantepspor).
- Edward Ross Ritvo, 90, American psychiatrist.
- Stuart Lyon Smith, 82, Canadian politician, Ontario MPP (1975–1982), leader of the Ontario Liberal Party (1976–1982).
- William Tietz, 93, American veterinarian and academic administrator, president of Montana State University (1977–1990).
- Claudell Washington, 65, American baseball player (Atlanta Braves, New York Yankees, Oakland Athletics), World Series champion (1974), prostate cancer.
- Eppie Wietzes, 82, Dutch-born Canadian racing driver, heart failure.
- Sarunyoo Wongkrachang, 59, Thai actor (13 Beloved, Ong Bak 2) and film director (Kon Khon), liver cancer.
- Zoogin, 30, Swedish racehorse.

=== 11 ===
- Mahjoub Ben Bella, 73, Algerian-born French painter.
- Kraisak Choonhavan, 72, Thai politician, Senator (2000–2006), tongue cancer.
- Katsuhisa Hattori, 83, Japanese composer (Fist of the North Star), heart failure.
- Marjorie G. Horning, 102, American biochemist and pharmacologist.
- Emmanuel Issoze-Ngondet, 59, Gabonese politician, Prime Minister (2016–2019) and Minister of Foreign Affairs (2012–2016), asthma.
- Earnie Killum, 72, American basketball player (Los Angeles Lakers).
- František Kotlaba, 93, Czech botanist and mycologist.
- Roy Little Chief, 81, Canadian First Nations rights activist and politician, Chief of the Siksika Nation (1981–1983).
- Rodolfo Machado, 82, Argentinian actor (Bajo el signo de la patria, El Picnic de los Campanelli).
- Marcel Maréchal, 82, French actor (I as in Icarus, Fanfan, Julien Fontanes, magistrat) and film director.
- Bernard J. Matkowsky, 80, American mathematician.
- Basil Meeking, 90, New Zealand Roman Catholic prelate, Bishop of Christchurch (1987–1995).
- Burton Natarus, 86, American politician, Chicago alderman (1971–2007).
- Dennis O'Neil, 81, American comic book writer (Batman, Iron Man) and editor (Marvel Comics).
- Stella Pevsner, 98, American author.
- Matt Poore, 90, New Zealand cricketer (Canterbury, national team).
- Sir Clem Renouf, 99, Australian accountant, president of Rotary International (1978–1979).
- Hermann Salomon, 82, German Olympic athlete (1960, 1964, 1968).
- Rosa Maria Sardà, 78, Spanish actress (Alegre ma non troppo, Carol's Journey, My Mother Likes Women) and comedian, Goya winner (1994, 2002), lymphoma.
- Cy Strulovitch, 94, Canadian Olympic basketball player (1948).
- Elly Stone, 93, American singer and actress.
- Hosbet Suresh, 90, Indian jurist and human rights activist.
- Stefania Świerzy, 86, Polish Olympic gymnast (1952).
- David N. Vaughan Jr., 85, American politician.
- Mel Winkler, 78, American actor (Devil in a Blue Dress, Crash Bandicoot, Doc Hollywood).

=== 12 ===
- Joost Boks, 78, Dutch-born Canadian Olympic field hockey player (1964, 1968).
- Claude A. Bray Jr., 88, American politician, member of the Georgia House of Representatives (1967–1987).
- Carl Brewer, 63, American politician, mayor of Wichita (2007–2015).
- Rayshard Brooks, 27, American police detainee, shot.
- Aileen Christianson, 75, Scottish academic and writer.
- Gulzar Dehlvi, 93, Indian Urdu poet.
- Carl Eiríksson, 90, Icelandic Olympic sports shooter (1992).
- Marian Fowler, 90, Canadian literary scholar.
- Lino Esterino Garavaglia, 92, Italian Roman Catholic prelate, Bishop of Tivoli (1987–1991) and Cesena-Sarsina (1991–2003).
- Ali Hadi, 53, Iraqi football player (Al-Quwa Al-Jawiya, Al-Zawraa) and manager (Zakho), COVID-19.
- Abani Mohan Joardar, 79, Indian politician, West Bengal MLA (since 2011).
- Charles Krafft, 72, American painter and ceramicist, cancer.
- Malcolm Mabry, 86, American politician, member of the Mississippi House of Representatives (1964–1980) and Senate (1980–1988).
- Geoffrey Martin, 92, Australian footballer (Launceston, Ulverstone, Burnie).
- Claude Ndam, 65, Cameroonian singer-songwriter.
- Molly Neptune Parker, 81, American basketweaver, cancer.
- Chylgychy Ondar, 64, Russian politician, Deputy (1999–2007), COVID-19.
- Juli Sanclimens i Genescà, 84, Spanish politician, Mayor of Manresa (1987–1995) and member of the Catalan Parliament (1984–1995).
- William S. Sessions, 90, American civil servant, Director of the FBI (1987–1993), Judge (1974–1987) and Chief Judge (1980–1987) of the U.S. District Court for Western Texas.
- Arthur Spatt, 94, American jurist, Judge of the U.S. District Court for Eastern New York (since 1989).
- Ricky Valance, 84, Welsh singer ("Tell Laura I Love Her").
- Albert Vitali, 64, Swiss politician, member of the National Council (since 2011), cancer.
- Werner Volkmer, 76, German-Canadian documentary filmmaker.
- Ralph M. Winge, 94, American politician.
- Parasnath Yadav, 71, Indian politician, Uttar Pradesh MLA, bladder cancer.
- Perfecto Yasay Jr., 73, Filipino politician, Secretary of Foreign Affairs (2016–2017), pneumonia complicated by cancer.

=== 13 ===
- Sheikh Mohammed Abdullah, 74, Bangladeshi politician, Minister of Religious Affairs (since 2019), COVID-19.
- Théophile Philippe Barakat, 67, Syrian Syriac Catholic hierarch, Archbishop of Homs (since 2016).
- Leslie Berlowitz, 76, American academic administrator (American Academy of Arts and Sciences).
- Sultan Uddin Bhuiyan, 69, Bangladeshi politician.
- Eula Bingham, 90, American scientist.
- Marj Carpenter, 93, American Presbyterian leader, missionary and reporter, Moderator of the General Assembly of the Presbyterian Church (1995–1996).
- Ralph Doty, 78, American politician.
- Pepe el Ferreiro, 78, Spanish archaeologist.
- Kirvan Fortuin, 28, South African dancer and choreographer, stabbed.
- Dick Garmaker, 87, American basketball player (Minneapolis Lakers, New York Knicks, Minnesota Golden Gophers).
- Jim Grelle, 83, American Olympic middle-distance runner (1960).
- Donald James Hall, 84, American freshwater ecologist.
- Nic Jorge, 78, Filipino basketball coach (national team) and secretary general of the Basketball Association of the Philippines.
- B. Kannan, 69, Indian cinematographer (Oru Nadigai Natakam Parkiral, Kadalora Kavithaigal, Solla Thudikuthu Manasu).
- Weldon L. Kennedy, 81, American FBI agent.
- Sabiha Khanum, 84, Pakistani actress (Do Ansoo, Mukhra, Anjuman), kidney disease.
- Bram Kloppert, 73, Dutch boxer.
- Mike McCormick, 81, American baseball player (San Francisco Giants, Baltimore Orioles, Kansas City Royals), Cy Young Award (1967), Parkinson's disease.
- Donald W. Meinig, 95, American geographer.
- Mags Murray, 58, Irish politician.
- Mohammed Nasim, 72, Bangladeshi politician, MP (1986–1987, 1991–2006, since 2014), Minister of Home Affairs (1999–2001) and Health (2014–2019), stroke.
- Luther Price, 58, American experimental filmmaker and visual artist.
- Vasant Raiji, 100, Indian cricketer (Bombay, Baroda).
- Maurice Rajsfus, 92, French writer and historian.
- Jean Raspail, 94, French author (The Camp of the Saints, Moi, Antoine de Tounens, roi de Patagonie).
- Helge Rykkja, 76, Norwegian writer and poet.
- Nancy Saunders, 94, American actress (The Three Stooges), leukemia.
- Lucy Scarbrough, 92, American classical pianist and teacher.
- Ronald Tackmann, 66, American painter and sculptor.
- Colo Tavernier O'Hagan, 75, British-French screenwriter (A Week's Vacation, Beatrice, Story of Women), cancer.
- Herbert T. Ueda, 91, American ice drilling engineer.
- Tineke Verburg, 64, Dutch journalist and TV presenter.
- Pramono Edhie Wibowo, 64, Indonesian military officer, Army Chief of Staff (2011–2013), heart attack.
- Marc Zermati, 75, French record producer and promoter.

=== 14 ===
- Saiful Azam, 79, Bangladeshi air force pilot.
- Sally Banes, 69, American dance historian and critic, ovarian cancer.
- Stefano Bertacco, 57, Italian politician.
- Don Candy, 91, Australian tennis player, 1956 French Open champion.
- Luce Douady, 16, French climber, world youth champion and European championships bronze medalist (2019), fall.
- Ed Fitz Gerald, 96, American baseball player (Pittsburgh Pirates, Washington Senators, Cleveland Indians) and coach.
- Jacqui Gasson, Welsh politician, lord mayor of Cardiff (2004–2005).
- Betty Goudsmit-Oudkerk, 96, Dutch resistance member.
- Sarah Hegazi, 30, Egyptian LGBT rights activist, suicide.
- William Dennis Hunt, 76, American actor (Flesh Gordon, Critters 3, Evan Almighty).
- Ibidunni Ighodalo, 39, Nigerian beauty queen and businesswoman, cardiac arrest.
- Elsa Joubert, 97, South African Sestigers writer, COVID-19.
- Noel Kelly, 84, Australian rugby league player (Ipswich, Western Suburbs Magpies, national team).
- Helena van der Kraan, 80, Dutch artist and photographer, cancer.
- Mohammad-Ali Keshavarz, 90, Iranian actor (The Desert of the Tartars, The Fateful Day, Through the Olive Trees).
- Simon Kverndal, 62, British barrister.
- Pierre Lumbi, 70, Congolese politician, Senator (since 2016), COVID-19.
- Nurul Haque Manik, 55, Bangladeshi footballer (Brothers Union, national team), brain hemorrhage.
- Arunkumar Mehta, 80, Indian diamond and gem executive, CEO of Rosy Blue.
- Aarón Padilla Gutiérrez, 77, Mexican footballer (Pumas, Atlante, national team), COVID-19.
- Sushant Singh Rajput, 34, Indian actor (M.S. Dhoni: The Untold Story, Chhichhore, Detective Byomkesh Bakshy!), suicide by hanging.
- Haroldo Rodas, 74, Guatemalan diplomat and politician, Minister of Foreign Affairs (2008–2012), COVID-19.
- Claude Samuel, 88, French music critic and radio executive.
- Keith Tippett, 72, British jazz pianist (King Crimson, Centipede) and composer.
- Raj Mohan Vohra, 88, Indian military officer, COVID-19.
- Tawfiq al-Yasiri, Iraqi politician, member of the IRDC, COVID-19.

=== 15 ===
- B. Santosh Babu, 37, Indian military officer, beaten.
- Winston Backus, 99, Canadian politician, Alberta MLA (1971–1979).
- Mário Calixto Filho, 73, Brazilian politician, Senator for Rondônia (2004–2005), COVID-19.
- Juan Díaz, 84, Chilean Olympic boxer (1960).
- Lilia Dizon, 91, Filipino actress (The Moises Padilla Story).
- José Gentil Rosa, 80, Brazilian politician, Maranhão MLA (1987–1991, 1995–1999, since 2019), complications from COVID-19.
- Giulio Giorello, 75, Italian philosopher, COVID-19.
- Clara Gowases, 59–60, Namibian politician, cancer.
- Ismail Ibrahim, 87, Pakistani cricketer (Karachi).
- Fred Jarvis, 95, British trade union leader, President of the Trades Union Congress (1987).
- Renato de Jesus, 67, Brazilian politician, Rio de Janeiro MLA (1995–2011), complications from COVID-19.
- Nagendra Nath Jha, 85, Indian diplomat, Lieutenant Governor of the Andaman and Nicobar Islands (2001–2004).
- Badar Uddin Ahmed Kamran, 69, Bangladeshi politician, mayor of Sylhet (2003–2013), COVID-19.
- Jan Peder Lamm, 84, Swedish archaeologist.
- Beth Levine, 60, American physician, cancer.
- Wolfram Lorenzen, 68, German pianist.
- Seifu Makonnen, 68, Ethiopian Olympic boxer (1972).
- Marinho, 63, Brazilian footballer (Atlético Mineiro, América, national team), pancreatitis and prostate cancer.
- Robert S. Molaro, 69, American politician, member of the Illinois Senate (1993–2003) and Illinois House of Representatives (2003–2009).
- Adebayo Osinowo, 64, Nigerian politician, member of the Senate (since 2019) and Lagos State House of Assembly (2003–2019), complications from COVID-19.
- Michel Roquebert, 91, French historian and writer.
- Jorge Rubio, 75, Mexican baseball player (California Angels).
- Anton Schlembach, 88, German Roman Catholic prelate, Bishop of Speyer (1983–2007).
- Kirk R. Smith, 73, American climatologist, cardiac arrest.
- Phil Takahashi, 63, Canadian Olympic judoka (1984, 1988).
- Nana Tuffour, 66, Ghanaian highlife singer.

=== 16 ===
- Yuji Adachi, 56, Japanese guitarist and songwriter (Dead End), sepsis.
- Mohammad Asghar, 74, Welsh politician, member of the Senedd (since 2007).
- Abner Aust, 98, American Air Force colonel.
- John Benfield, 68, British actor (Prime Suspect, Speed Racer, Cassandra's Dream), sarcoma.
- Knut Bohwim, 89, Norwegian film director (Olsen Gang).
- Roger Borniche, 101, French author and police detective.
- Tamar Bornstein-Lazar, 93, Israeli children's writer.
- Valério Breda, 75, Italian Roman Catholic prelate, Bishop of Penedo, Brazil (since 1997).
- Martin T. Carey, 98, American entrepreneur and preservationist.
- Danding Cojuangco, 85, Filipino food and beverage executive and politician, member of the House of Representatives (1969–1972), CEO and chairman of San Miguel Corporation.
- Federico Corriente, 79, Spanish Arabist, lexicographer and academic (Royal Spanish Academy).
- Jannie van Eyck-Vos, 84, Dutch Olympic athlete (1964).
- Ben Goto, 90, Japanese journalist and novelist, aspiration pneumonia.
- Joan Hill, 89, American artist.
- Haribhau Jawale, 66, Indian politician, MP (2009–2019), COVID-19.
- Paul Kramer, 86, American politician, member of the New Jersey General Assembly (1992–2000).
- John Madigan, 53, Australian politician, Senator (2011–2016), liver and bowel cancer.
- Reavis L. Mitchell Jr., 72, American historian and academic administrator (Fisk University).
- John J. Mooney, 90, American chemical engineer, stroke.
- Peter Nguyen, 76, Hong Kong judge, Director of Public Prosecutions (1994–1997).
- Paulinho Paiakan, 67, Brazilian indigenous leader, COVID-19.
- Edén Pastora, 83, Nicaraguan revolutionary and politician, respiratory failure.
- Bryan Perrett, 85, British military historian.
- Patrick Poivey, 72, French actor (Loulou, Mune: Guardian of the Moon) and voiceover artist.
- Ernest Poruthota, 88, Sri Lankan Roman Catholic prelate, Archbishop of Colombo (1987–1991).
- John G. Richardson, 62, American politician, member and Speaker of the Maine House of Representatives (1998–2006), heart attack.
- Robert D. Richardson, 86, American historian and biographer, complications from a fall.
- Georgi Ryabov, 81, Estonian-born Russian footballer (Tallinna Dünamo, Dynamo Moscow, USSR national team).
- John Joe Sheehan, 90, Irish Gaelic footballer (Kerry).
- Alistair Soper, 83, New Zealand rugby union player (national team, Southland, Blackheath).
- A. K. S. Usgaonkar, 92, Indian politician, Goa MLA.
- Eusebio Vélez, 85, Spanish racing cyclist.
- Charles Webb, 81, American novelist (The Graduate).

=== 17 ===
- Marlene Ahrens, 86, Chilean javelin thrower and equestrian, Olympic silver medallist (1956), heart failure.
- Harold David Anderson, 96, Australian public servant and diplomat.
- Tariq Aziz, 84, Pakistani actor, television show host (Bazm E Tariq Aziz) and politician, MP (1997–1999).
- Gordon H. Bower, 87, American cognitive psychologist.
- Lewis John Carlino, 88, American screenwriter (I Never Promised You a Rose Garden) and director (The Great Santini), blood cancer.
- William C. Dement, 91, American psychiatrist and sleep researcher, cardiovascular disease.
- Terry Dicks, 83, British politician, MP (1983–1997).
- Madanmohan Dutta, 62, Indian politician.
- K. Anders Ericsson, 72, Swedish psychologist and scholar.
- Victor Feldbrill, 96, Canadian conductor and violinist.
- Dan Foster, 61, American radio broadcaster, COVID-19.
- Hugh Fraser, 62, Canadian jazz musician, cancer.
- Vic Gilliam, 66, American politician, member of the Oregon House of Representatives (2007–2017), amyotrophic lateral sclerosis.
- Astrid Gjertsen, 91, Danish-born Norwegian politician, MP (1973–1989).
- Arthur R. Gottschalk, 95, American politician.
- Bill Groman, 83, American football player (Houston Oilers, Denver Broncos, Buffalo Bills).
- Raimo Honkanen, 81, Finnish Olympic racing cyclist (1960, 1968).
- Magda Kandil, 62, Egyptian economist.
- György Kárpáti, 84, Hungarian water polo player, Olympic champion (1952, 1956, 1964).
- Petr Král, 78, Czech poet.
- William W. McCutcheon, 93, American police officer and politician.
- David Morgan, 82, British sociologist.
- Fabrice Philipot, 54, French racing cyclist.
- Mairi Robinson, 74, Scottish lexicographer.
- Roberto Salmeron, 98, Brazilian electrical engineer.
- Jean Kennedy Smith, 92, American diplomat, ambassador to Ireland (1993–1998), Presidential Medal of Freedom winner, founder of VSA.
- Michael E. Soulé, 84, American biologist, co-founder of the Society for Conservation Biology.
- Jerry Sturm, 83, American football player (Calgary Stampeders, Denver Broncos, New Orleans Saints).
- Willie Thorne, 66, English snooker player and commentator, leukaemia.
- Trần Ngọc Châu, 96, Vietnamese soldier and politician, COVID-19.
- Ronny Van Sweevelt, 57, Belgian Olympic racing cyclist (1984), food poisoning.
- Pietro Zoppas, 86, Italian racing cyclist.

=== 18 ===
- Tibor Benedek, 47, Hungarian water polo player, Olympic champion (2000, 2004, 2008), pancreatic cancer.
- Claus Biederstaedt, 91, German actor (The Great Temptation, Don't Worry About Your Mother-in-Law, Before Sundown).
- Anna Blume, 83, German art photographer.
- John Bredenkamp, 79, Zimbabwean rugby union player (national team) and businessman.
- Hux Brown, 75, Jamaican guitarist (Toots and the Maytals).
- Arturo Chaires, 83, Mexican footballer (C.D. Guadalajara, national team).
- Barbara Costikyan, 91, American food writer, complications from COVID-19.
- Ali Kamal Etman, 79, Egyptian Olympic football player (1964) and coach.
- Ingegärd Fredin, 89, Swedish freestyle swimmer.
- Malim Ghozali PK, 71, Malaysian writer, cancer.
- Breene Harimoto, 66, American politician, member of the Hawaii Senate (since 2015), pancreatic cancer.
- Mikhail Ignatyev, 58, Russian politician, Head of the Chuvash Republic (2010–2020), bilateral pneumonia and complications from COVID-19.
- Nicolas Joel, 67, French opera director, GM of Paris Opera (2009–2014), complications from a stroke.
- Ellington Jordan, 80, American songwriter ("I'd Rather Go Blind").
- Jeffrey S. Juris, 48–49, American anthropologist.
- Sergei Khrushchev, 84, Russian-American engineer.
- Kossi Koudagba, 24, Togolese footballer (Espoir Tsevie, ASC Kara, national team).
- Lachhman Singh Lehl, 96, Indian general and military historian.
- Endre Lépold, 64, Hungarian Olympic sprinter (1976).
- Dame Vera Lynn, 103, British singer ("We'll Meet Again", "The White Cliffs of Dover").
- Francisco Moniz, 54, Angolan Olympic boxer.
- Thomas S. Moorman Jr., 79, American Air Force general.
- Sachy, 48, Indian screenwriter (Makeup Man) and film director (Anarkali, Ayyappanum Koshiyum), cardiac arrest.
- Milo Sarens, 82, Belgian Olympic boxer (1960).
- Alfred Schmidtberger, 90, Austrian Olympic sprint canoer.
- Jules Sedney, 97, Surinamese economist and politician, Prime Minister (1969–1973) and Governor of the Central Bank of Suriname (1980–1983).
- Antonio Veciana, 91, Cuban spy (CIA, Alpha 66).
- Jim Young, 94, New Zealand boat builder and designer.

=== 19 ===
- Waliur Rahman Bhuiyan, 67, Bangladeshi businessman.
- Terry Brennan, 79, Irish Fine Gael politician.
- Karen Bridge, 60, English badminton player, cancer.
- Malcolm Brooks, 90, Australian politician, New South Wales MLA (1973–1976).
- Thomas Brzustowski, 83, Polish-born Canadian engineer and academic.
- Cho Hae-il, 79, South Korean writer.
- Mario Corso, 78, Italian football player (Inter, national team) and manager (Mantova).
- Madeline McWhinney Dale, 98, American economist and banker.
- Ramchand Goala, 79, Bangladeshi cricket player (national team) and coach.
- Ralph Haas, 87, Canadian engineer and academic.
- Sir Ian Holm, 88, English actor (Alien, Chariots of Fire, The Lord of the Rings), BAFTA winner (1982), complications from Parkinson's disease.
- Marjorie Hoy, 79, American entomologist.
- Kevin Leahy, 71, Australian politician, Western Australian MLA (1989–1996) and MLC (2004–2005).
- Thandi Mpambo-Sibhukwana, South African politician, MP (since 2019).
- Dumitru Munteanu, 87, Romanian footballer (Petrolul Ploiești, Steaua București, national team).
- David Perlman, 101, American science journalist (San Francisco Chronicle), cancer.
- Karin Peschel, 84, German economist, rector of Kiel University (1992–1996).
- A. L. Raghavan, 87, Indian playback singer (Pona Machaan Thirumbi Vandhan, Kudumba Gouravam, Azhagarmalai Kalvan).
- Carlos Ruiz Zafón, 55, Spanish novelist (The Prince of Mist, The Shadow of the Wind, The Prisoner of Heaven), colon cancer.
- Regan Russell, 65, Canadian animal rights activist, traffic collision.
- Vidyaben Shah, 97, Indian social worker.
- Harry Smith, 69, British journalist.
- Pat Stark, 90, American football player (Syracuse Orange) and coach (Rochester Yellowjackets).
- Melville Y. Stewart, 85, American philosopher.
- René Alphonse van den Berghe, 80, Belgian art dealer and convicted art thief, complications during surgery.
- Noël Vandernotte, 96, French coxswain, Olympic bronze medallist (1936).

=== 20 ===
- Nick Acocella, 77, American journalist and author, cancer.
- Dennis T. Avery, 84, American food writer and policy analyst.
- Gerhard J. Bellinger, 89, German theologian.
- Constance Curry, 86, American civil rights activist and writer, sepsis.
- Ema Derossi-Bjelajac, 94, Croatian politician, President of the Presidency of SR Croatia (1985–1986).
- Sylvio Capanema, 82, Brazilian jurist, COVID-19.
- Joseph Ferris, 85, American politician, member of the New York State Assembly (1975–1984), COVID-19.
- Svein Arne Hansen, 74, Norwegian sports official, president of the European Athletic Association (since 2015).
- Emma Harman, 108, American politician, member of the Washington House of Representatives (1940–1944).
- Angur Baba Joshi, 87, Nepali educationist and social activist, throat and breast cancer.
- Jim Kiick, 73, American football player (Miami Dolphins, Denver Broncos), Super Bowl champion (1972, 1973), Alzheimer's disease.
- Philip Latham, 91, British actor (The Troubleshooters, Dracula: Prince of Darkness, Ring of Spies).
- Pedro Lima, 49, Portuguese actor (Ilha dos Amores, Second Life) and Olympic swimmer (1988, 1992), suicide by drowning.
- Kamal Lohani, 85, Bangladeshi journalist, Director General of the Shilpakala Academy (2009–2011), COVID-19.
- William Millerson, 67, Aruban-born Curaçaoan karateka and politician, chairman of the Estates of Curaçao (2017–2020).
- Mufti Muhammad Naeem, 64, Pakistani Islamic scholar, co-founder of Jamia Binoria, COVID-19.
- Joseph D. Patero, 88, American politician, member of the New Jersey General Assembly (1974–1986, 1988–1991).
- Kirk Perron, 56, American businessman, founder of Jamba Juice.
- Maria Lluïsa Oliveda Puig, 97, Spanish actress.
- Robert L. Taylor, 95, American aviator.
- Aaron Tokona, 45, New Zealand guitarist and singer (Weta, Cairo Knife Fight, Fly My Pretties), heart attack.
- Max Tuerk, 26, American football player (Los Angeles Chargers, Arizona Cardinals, USC Trojans), enlarged heart.
- Usharani, 62, Indian actress (Puthiya Vaarpugal, Oru Oorla Oru Rajakumari, Millennium Stars), kidney failure.
- John White, 77, Australian politician, Tasmanian MHA (1986–1998) and MLC (1998–1999).

=== 21 ===
- Marconi Alencar, 81, Brazilian politician, COVID-19.
- Sergio Salvador Aguirre Anguiano, 77, Mexican jurist, associate justice of the Supreme Court (1995–2012), stomach cancer.
- György Bálint, 100, Hungarian horticulturist and politician, MP (1994–1998), COVID-19.
- Lucius Barker, 92, American political scientist, complications from Alzheimer's disease.
- Richárd Bicskey, 83, Hungarian Olympic cyclist (1964).
- Sheela Borthakur, 84, Indian social worker.
- Felicity Bryan, 74, British literary agent and journalist, stomach cancer.
- Sergey Chilikov, 66, Russian photographer.
- Pascal Clément, 75, French politician, Minister of Justice (2005–2007), pulmonary infection.
- Scott Duff, 69, American politician, complications from cancer.
- Rajinder Goel, 77, Indian cricketer (Delhi, Haryana, Southern Punjab).
- Edward Grant, 93, American historian.
- Jürgen Holtz, 87, German actor (Rosa Luxemburg, Made in Israel, Good Bye, Lenin!), complications from cancer.
- Bill Horace, 44, Liberian fighter, shot.
- Talib Jauhari, 80, Pakistani Islamic scholar, COVID-19.
- Apinan Kaewpila, 35, Thai footballer (Samutsongkhram, TOT, Samut Sakhon), traffic collision.
- Joseph Korto, Liberian politician, minister of education (2006-2010).
- Angela Madsen, 60, American athlete, Paralympic bronze medallist (2012), drowned.
- Hugh Mellor, 81, British philosopher.
- Anthony J. Naldrett, 86, Canadian geologist.
- Mile Nedelkoski, 84, Macedonian writer and poet.
- Jeet Singh Negi, 95, Indian folk singer and composer.
- Étienne Périer, 88, Belgian film director (Bridge to the Sun, When Eight Bells Toll, Zeppelin).
- Bernardino Piñera, 104, Chilean Roman Catholic prelate, Bishop of Temuco (1960–1977) and Archbishop of La Serena (1983–1990), COVID-19.
- Ahmed Radhi, 56, Iraqi football player (Al-Zawraa, national team) and manager (Al-Shorta), COVID-19.
- Manny Santos, 85, Australian Olympic weightlifter (1956, 1960).
- Sam Sarin, 84, Croatian-born Australian fisherman.
- Ken Snow, 50, American soccer player (Chicago Power, St. Louis Steamers, national team), complications from COVID-19.
- Florence M. Sullivan, 90, American politician, member of the New York State Assembly (1979–1983).
- Zeev Sternhell, 85, Polish-born Israeli historian and political scientist.
- Bobby Storey, 64, Irish IRA volunteer.
- Badiuzzaman Tunu, 91, Bangladeshi military officer.
- Ed Tuttle, 74, American architect and interior designer.
- Bobana Veličković, 30, Serbian Olympic sport shooter (2012, 2016), complications from childbirth.
- Joan Pau Verdier, 73, French singer.
- Dennis Young, 90, New Zealand rugby union player (Canterbury, national team), cancer.

=== 22 ===
- Vernon Alden, 97, American scholar, president of Ohio University.
- Witold Baran, 80, Polish Olympic middle-distance runner (1964).
- Pappukutty Bhagavathar, 107, Indian actor (Sree Guruvayoorappan, Kattukurangu) and playback singer.
- Steve Bing, 55, American entertainment executive (Shangri-La Entertainment), screenwriter and film producer (Kangaroo Jack, Rules Don't Apply), suicide by jumping.
- Carlos Bosch, 75, Argentine photojournalist.
- Dick Buerkle, 72, American Olympic runner (1976).
- Nouri Dhiab, 76, Iraqi footballer (national team).
- Jesus Dosado, 80, Filipino Roman Catholic prelate, former Archbishop of Ozamis (1981–2016).
- Stanley Kester, 91, American politician.
- Phil Krueger, 90, American football player, coach (Utah State Aggies, Fresno State Bulldogs), and general manager (Tampa Bay Buccaneers).
- Carlos Luis Morales, 55, Ecuadorian footballer (Independiente, Emelec, national team) and politician, cardiocirculatory arrest.
- Dick Oxtoby, 80, English footballer (Tranmere Rovers, Bolton Wanderers, Runcorn), Lewy body dementia.
- Harry Penk, 85, English footballer (Wigan Athletic, Plymouth Argyle, Southampton).
- David Pickles, 84, English cricketer.
- Pierino Prati, 73, Italian footballer (Milan, Roma, national team), cancer.
- Joel Schumacher, 80, American film director (The Lost Boys, Falling Down, Batman Forever), cancer.
- Nisar Ahmed Siddiqui, 76, Pakistani academic.
- Shirley Adelson Siegel, 101, American lawyer, complications from a stroke.
- Stewart Speed, 77, New Zealand cricketer (Auckland).
- Karlman Wasserman, 93, American physiologist (Wasserman 9-Panel Plot).
- Thomas Welder, 80, American Benedictine nun and educator, President of the University of Mary (1978–2009), kidney cancer.

=== 23 ===
- Saadi Toma Abbas, 81, Iraqi politician, Minister of Defence (1990–1991).
- Vehbi Akdağ, 71, Turkish freestyle wrestler, Olympic silver medalist (1972).
- Nikos Alefantos, 81, Greek football player (Atromitos Piraeus, Panegialios) and manager (Olympiacos), heart attack.
- Ryan Anthony, 51, American trumpeter (Canadian Brass, Dallas Symphony Orchestra), multiple myeloma.
- Harry Basch, 94, American actor (Falcon Crest).
- Jean-Michel Bokamba-Yangouma, Congolese trade unionist and politician, COVID-19.
- Xabiiba Cabdilaahi, 58, Djiboutian singer.
- Lydia Chagoll, 89, Dutch-born Belgian dancer, choreographer and film director.
- Lawrence Chelin, 61, South African footballer (Arcadia Shepherds, Durban City F.C., Atlanta Chiefs), leukaemia.
- Shiraz Dharsi, 73, Indian cricketer (Sind, Karachi Blues, Scotland).
- Nikolai Fadeyechev, 87, Russian ballet dancer and teacher, People's Artist of the USSR (1976).
- Michael Falzon, 48, Australian musical actor and producer, cancer.
- Azizur Rahman Hazarvi, 72, Pakistani Islamic scholar.
- Dick Jefferies, 88, English palaeontologist.
- Arthur Keaveney, 68, Irish historian, COVID-19.
- Jurjaan Koolen, 81, Dutch Olympic volleyball player (1964).
- Li Zhensheng, 79, Chinese photojournalist, cerebral hemorrhage.
- Jampel Lodoy, 44, Russian-Tuvan Buddhist lama, Kamby Lama of Tuva (2005–2010, since 2019), COVID-19.
- Justin Love, 41, American basketball player (Saint Louis Billikens, Beijing Olympians, BC Odesa).
- Mike McCool, 68, New Zealand rugby union player (Hawke's Bay, Wairarapa Bush, national team).
- Robert Newton Peck, 92, American author (A Day No Pigs Would Die, Soup), laryngeal cancer.
- Margarita Pracatan, 89, Cuban novelty singer.
- Francisco Javier Prado Aránguiz, 91, Chilean Roman Catholic prelate, Bishop of Rancagua (1993–2004) and Iquique (1984–1988), cancer.
- Hannes Rainer, 66, Austrian Olympic sport shooter.
- Patricio Rodríguez, 81, Chilean tennis player, cancer.
- Nilamber Dev Sharma, 88, Indian writer and literary scholar.
- Liam Treadwell, 34, English National Hunt jockey.
- César Bosco Vivas Robelo, 78, Nicaraguan Roman Catholic prelate, Bishop of León (1991–2019).

=== 24 ===
- Gösta Ågren, 83, Finnish poet.
- Alfredo Biondi, 91, Italian politician, MP (1968–1972, 1979–2008), Minister of Justice (1994–1995) and Environment (1983–1984).
- Harry Britt, 82, American political activist, member (1979–1993) and president (1989–1990) of the San Francisco Board of Supervisors.
- Robert L. Carneiro, 93, American anthropologist.
- Étienne Cerexhe, 89, Belgian politician and judge, member of the Senate (1985–1987) and Chamber of Representatives (1988–1991).
- Ding-Shinn Chen, 76, Taiwanese hepatologist, pancreatic cancer.
- Lester Crystal, 85, American news executive (PBS NewsHour, NBC Nightly News), president of NBC News (1977–1979), stomach cancer and pneumonia.
- Jacques Demêtre, 96, French blues historian.
- Ralph Dunagin, 83, American cartoonist (The Middletons, Grin and Bear It).
- Yuriy Dyachuk-Stavytskyi, 73, Ukrainian football player and manager (Spartak Ivano-Frankivsk, Karpaty Lviv).
- Marc Fumaroli, 88, French historian and essayist.
- Sir Anthony Hammond, 79, British lawyer and public servant, Treasury Solicitor (1997–2000).
- Michael Hawley, 58, American educator, pianist and visual artist, colon cancer.
- Larry Hess, 85, American racing driver.
- Alan Howard, 91, English nutritionist.
- Roger Johnston, 90, Australian politician, member of the House of Representatives (1977–1980).
- Eddie Kasko, 88, American baseball player (St. Louis Cardinals, Cincinnati Reds, Houston Astros) and manager (Boston Red Sox).
- Claude Le Péron, 72, French bass guitarist.
- David MacLennan, 82, Canadian biochemist.
- Jack D. McCoy, 92, American racing driver, illness.
- Mohammed Yaseen Mohammed, 57, Iraqi Olympic weightlifter (1980, 1984), COVID-19.
- Jane Parker-Smith, 70, British classical organist.
- Rose Paterson, 63, British business executive and fundraiser, suicide.
- Britton Payne, 79, American curler.
- Nigel Weiss, 83, South African astronomer and mathematician.

=== 25 ===
- Perry Adkisson, 91, American entomologist and academic administrator, Chancellor of the Texas A&M University System (1986–1990).
- Abiola Ajimobi, 70, Nigerian politician, Senator (2004–2007) and Governor of Oyo State (2011–2019), complications from COVID-19.
- Suzana Amaral, 88, Brazilian film director and screenwriter (Hour of the Star, A Hidden Life).
- A. J. Beirens, 73, Belgian radio producer and journalist, physician assisted suicide.
- Nimai Bhattacharya, 89, Indian writer.
- Chen Zhaoyuan, 89, Chinese engineer.
- Patrice Gélard, 81, French politician, Senator (1995–2014).
- Lester Grinspoon, 92, American psychiatrist and marijuana advocate (Marihuana Reconsidered).
- Richard Grove, 64, British environmental historian.
- Owen Harries, 90, Welsh-born Australian academic and magazine editor.
- Huey, 32, American rapper ("Pop, Lock & Drop It"), shot.
- Lonnie Ingram, 72, American microbiologist.
- Madeleine Juneau, 74, Canadian museologist.
- John Kennedy Sr., 91, Australian Hall of Fame football player and coach (Hawthorn, North Melbourne).
- Olivier Le Fèvre, 59, French astrophysicist, brain cancer.
- Tien-Yien Li, 75, Chinese-born American mathematician.
- Emeka Mamale, 42, Congolese footballer (DC Motema Pembe, Kaizer Chiefs, national team).
- Kilasu Massamba, 69, Congolese footballer (AS Dragons, national team).
- Art Miller Jr., 73, American politician, member of the Michigan Senate (1977–2002), lung cancer.
- Juan Ostoic, 89, Chilean Olympic basketball player (1952, 1956), heart failure.
- Papaléo Paes, 67, Brazilian physician and politician, Senator (2003–2011) and Vice Governor of Amapá (2015–2018), complications from COVID-19.
- Ionuț Popa, 67, Romanian football player and manager (UTA Arad, Bihor Oradea, Politehnica Iași).
- Marga Richter, 93, American composer.
- Joe Sinnott, 93, American Hall of Fame comic book artist (The Avengers, Thor, Fantastic Four).
- Peter E. Toschek, 87, German physicist.
- Maya Ulanovskaya, 87, American-born Russian-Israeli political dissident, writer and translator.
- Ivan Utrobin, 86, Russian cross-country skier, Olympic bronze medalist (1964).
- David Webb, 77, British Olympic rower.

=== 26 ===
- Fiona Adams, 84, British photographer.
- Abdoulatifou Aly, 60, Malagasy-born French Mahoran politician, Deputy (2007–2012).
- Kelly Asbury, 60, American animator and film director (Spirit: Stallion of the Cimarron, Shrek 2, Gnomeo & Juliet), abdominal cancer.
- Pierre-Antoine-Jean Bach, 87, French-born Laotian Roman Catholic prelate, Vicar Apostolic of Savannakhet (1971–1975).
- Katrin Beinroth, 38, German judoka, European open class champion (2003).
- Hermes Binner, 77, Argentine politician, Governor of Santa Fe (2007–2011) and Mayor of Rosario (1995–2003), pneumonia.
- Thomas Edwin Blanton Jr., 82, American terrorist and convicted murderer (16th Street Baptist Church bombing).
- Louis Breger, 84, American psychologist.
- Francis Carnwath, 80, British banker and charity executive.
- Chen Peiqiu, 97, Chinese painter and calligrapher.
- Choi Suk-hyeon, 22, South Korean triathlete, suicide.
- Ed Conroy, 73, Canadian politician, MLA for Rossland-Trail (1991–2001).
- Stuart Cornfeld, 67, American film producer (Zoolander, The Fly, Tropic Thunder), cancer.
- James Dunn, 80, British theologian.
- Sandra Feva, 73, American soul singer and composer.
- Theo Foley, 83, Irish football player (Burnley, Northampton Town, national team).
- Richard Gelles, 73, American sociologist, brain cancer.
- Arnie Ginsburg, 93, American disc jockey (WMEX).
- Milton Glaser, 91, American graphic designer, creator of the I ❤ NY slogan and co-founder of New York magazine, stroke and renal failure.
- Bernhard van Haersma Buma, 88, Dutch politician, mayor of Workum (1962–1970) and Sneek (1970–1993).
- Fred Hammer, 90, Luxembourgish sprinter (1952, 1956).
- Munawar Hasan, 78, Pakistani politician, President of Jamaat-e-Islami Pakistan (2009–2014), COVID-19.
- Margaret Jurgensmeier, 85, American baseball player (Rockford Peaches).
- Tami Lynn, 81, American soul singer.
- Diana Maddock, Baroness Maddock, 75, British politician, MP (1993–1997), Lord Temporal (since 1997) and President of the Liberal Democrats (1999–2000).
- Félix de Almeida Mendonça, 92, Brazilian politician, Deputy (1983–1987, 1991–2011), complications from COVID-19.
- Yordan Milanov, 95, Bulgarian military officer.
- Faqir Nabi, 67, Afghan actor, COVID-19.
- William Negri, 84, Italian footballer (Mantova, Bologna, national team).
- Tony Pidgley, 72, British property developer and financier (Berkeley Group).
- Jaroslav Pollák, 72, Slovak footballer (Sparta Prague, Austria Salzburg, national team).
- Taryn Power, 66, American actress (The Count of Monte Cristo, Sinbad and the Eye of the Tiger, Eating), leukemia.
- Ramon Revilla Sr., 93, Filipino actor (Iyo ang Tondo Kanya ang Cavite, Arrest: Pat. Rizal Alih, Exodus: Tales from the Enchanted Kingdom) and politician, Senator (1992–2004), heart failure.
- Viola Sachs, 90, Polish professor of literature.
- Don Seymour, 58, Canadian Hall of Fame jockey.
- John Springall, 87, English cricketer (Nottinghamshire).
- Julianus Kemo Sunarko, 78, Indonesian Roman Catholic prelate, Bishop of Purwokerto (2000–2016).
- Arthur Williamson, 89, Scottish footballer (Southend United).

=== 27 ===
- Belaid Abdessalam, 91, Algerian politician, Prime Minister (1992–1993).
- Norman C. Anderson, 92, American politician.
- Thereza de Orleans e Bragança, 91, Brazilian socialite.
- Pete Carr, 70, American guitarist (LeBlanc and Carr, Muscle Shoals Rhythm Section).
- Freddy Cole, 88, American jazz singer and pianist, complications from cardiovascular disease.
- Linda Cristal, 89, Argentine actress (The Perfect Furlough, The High Chaparral, Mr. Majestyk).
- Antonio Cuenco, 84, Filipino politician, member of the House of Representatives (1965–1969, 1987–1998, 2001–2010), COVID-19.
- Julian Curry, 82, English actor (Rumpole of the Bailey, Sky Captain and the World of Tomorrow, Escape to Victory).
- Adrian Devine, 68, American baseball player (Atlanta Braves, Texas Rangers), cancer.
- Tom Finn, 71, American musician (The Left Banke) and DJ.
- Susan Laughlin, 88, American politician.
- Giuseppe Matarrese, 86, Italian Roman Catholic prelate, Bishop of Frascati (1989–2009).
- Margaret Morton, 71, American photographer, leukemia.
- Nwam Jar Thaing, 67, Burmese writer, heart failure.
- Ilija Petković, 74, Serbian football player (OFK Beograd, Yugoslavia national team) and manager (national team), complications from perforated ulcer and COVID-19.
- Jenny Lind Porter, 92, American poet.
- Nicola Quarta, 92, Italian politician, Deputy (1978–1983).
- Mats Rådberg, 72, Swedish singer.
- Mihai Romilă, 69, Romanian footballer (Politehnica Iași, Dunărea Galați, national team).
- Luciano Rondinella, 86, Italian singer and actor.
- Sander Schnitger, 61, Dutch air force general, Commander of the Royal Netherlands Air Force (2012–2016).
- David Stronach, 89, Scottish archaeologist.
- Bob Warner, 69, Canadian ice hockey player (Toronto Maple Leafs).
- Khalid Wazir, 84, Pakistani cricketer (national team).
- Jack Whittaker, 72, American Powerball lottery winner.

=== 28 ===
- Nasir Ajanah, 64, Nigerian judge, Chief Judge of Kogi State (since 2004), COVID-19.
- Rudolfo Anaya, 82, American author (Bless Me, Ultima).
- Kim Bridgford, 60, American poet and professor, cancer.
- Joe Bugel, 80, American football coach (Phoenix Cardinals, Oakland Raiders, Washington Redskins).
- Zuriñe del Cerro, 64, Spanish feminist activist.
- Marián Čišovský, 40, Slovak footballer (Inter Bratislava, Viktoria Plzeň, national team), amyotrophic lateral sclerosis.
- Eliot Deutsch, 89, American philosopher.
- Manuel Donley, 92, Mexican-born American Tejano singer and musician.
- Simon H. Fell, 61, English bassist and composer.
- Klaus Francke, 83, German politician, member of the Bundestag (1976–1998, 2001–2002).
- Jim Holloway, American artist (Dungeons & Dragons).
- Edward Kleinbard, 68, American lawyer and tax academic, cancer.
- John Kneebone, 84, New Zealand farming leader.
- Silvia Lazarte, 56, Bolivian politician, President of the Constituent Assembly (2006–2008).
- Louis Mahoney, 81, Gambian-born British actor (Omen III: The Final Conflict, Doctor Who, Captain Phillips).
- Bill McFarlane, 90, Canadian football player (Toronto Argonauts).
- Matthew Morris, 51, Australian politician, New South Wales MP (2003–2011).
- Geetha Nagabhushan, 78, Indian writer, cardiac arrest.
- Dame Ingrid Roscoe, 76, English writer, Lord Lieutenant of West Yorkshire (2004–2018).
- Jim Ross, 90, New Zealand educationalist and public servant.
- Shen Jilan, 90, Chinese politician, delegate to the National People's Congress (since 1954), stomach cancer.
- Mimi Soltysik, 45, American socialist activist, co-chair of the Socialist Party USA (2013–2015), liver cancer.
- Md. Shahjahan Ali Talukder, 65, Bangladeshi politician, MP (1988–1990), COVID-19.
- Yu Lan, 99, Chinese actress (A Revolutionary Family).

=== 29 ===
- Bode Akindele, 88, Nigerian industrialist.
- Efraín Barquero, 89, Chilean poet.
- Richard Brooke, 93, British explorer.
- Abdullah al Mohsin Chowdhury, 57, Bangladeshi civil servant, Defence Secretary (since 2020), complications from COVID-19.
- James Paul Churchill, 96, American jurist, Judge (since 1974) and Chief Judge (1989) of the U.S. District Court for Eastern Michigan.
- Gernot Endemann, 77, German actor (Sesamstraße).
- James Douglas Henderson, 93, Canadian politician.
- Hachalu Hundessa, 34, Ethiopian singer-songwriter, shot.
- Jan Krajenbrink, 78, Dutch politician (House of Representatives, mayor of Woudenberg).
- Gene Lakusiak, 78, Canadian football player (Winnipeg Blue Bombers), dementia.
- Kamruddin Ahia Khan Majlish, Bangladeshi politician, cardiac arrest.
- Johnny Mandel, 94, American composer ("Suicide Is Painless", "The Shadow of Your Smile", "Emily"), Grammy winner (1966).
- Ernesto Marcel, 72, Panamanian boxer, WBA featherweight champion (1972–1974).
- Paula Marckx, 94, Belgian model, journalist and pilot (Marckx v Belgium).
- Benny Mardones, 73, American singer-songwriter ("Into the Night"), Parkinson's disease.
- Marian Orzechowski, 88, Polish politician, Minister of Foreign Affairs (1985–1988).
- Kevin Pay, 80, Australian footballer (Collingwood).
- Svend Aage Rask, 84, Danish footballer (B 1909, national team).
- Carl Reiner, 98, American actor, film director and writer (The Dick Van Dyke Show, Ocean's Eleven, The Jerk), Grammy winner (1999), nine-time Emmy winner, heart attack.
- Ken Shadie, 84, Australian screenwriter (Crocodile Dundee), cancer.
- Albert Sulon, 82, Belgian footballer (Club Liège, national team).
- Anthony Terlato, 86, American winemaker.
- Fredrick Töben, 76, German-born Australian Holocaust denier.
- Willie Wright, 80, American soul singer.

=== 30 ===
- Joe Arenas, 94, American football player (San Francisco 49ers).
- Ivo Banac, 73, Croatian historian and politician, president of the Liberal Party (2003–2004), MP (2003–2008).
- Tim Brooks, 72, American Hall of Fame professional wrestler (BTW, GCW, SCW), cancer.
- Ludwig Finscher, 90, German musicologist (Die Musik in Geschichte und Gegenwart).
- Jim Hargreaves, 70, Canadian ice hockey player (Vancouver Canucks).
- Dan Hicks, 68, American actor (Evil Dead II, Darkman, Intruder), cancer.
- Aleksandr Kabanov, 72, Russian water polo player, Olympic champion (1972, 1980).
- Alfred Kotey, 52, Ghanaian Olympic boxer (1988), WBO bantamweight champion (1993–1994), complications from a stroke.
- Tomio Kubota, 89, Japanese mathematician.
- Henry Martin, 94, American cartoonist.
- John Metras, 70, American-born Canadian football player (Hamilton Tiger-Cats).
- J. Nagbe Sloh, 55, Liberian politician and media executive, member of the House of Representatives.
