= Krupska =

Krupska is a surname. Notable people with the surname include:

- Dania Krupska (1921–2011), American dancer and choreographer
- Krystyna Krupska-Wysocka (1935–2020), Polish film director

== See also ==
- Mala Krupska Rujiška, village in Bosnia and Herzegovina
