= Sylvio Capanema =

Brazilian jurist (1938–2020)

Sylvio Capanema de Sousa (Brazil, 1938 – 20 June 2020) was a Brazilian jurist and author of the tenancy law. During his professional career he was a lawyer, professor of law and desembargador.

== Biography ==
Born in Rio de Janeiro, he graduated in 1960 from the National Faculty of Law. From 1970 to 1994, he held the position of legal consultant for the Association of Property Owners of Rio de Janeiro and the Confederation of Associations of Property Owners of Brazil, and founded the Association of Lawyers for Real Estate Law (ABAMI). He was a professor at Candido Mendes University.

After 33 years of experience as a lawyer, he joined the Judiciary of the State of Rio de Janeiro in 1994, by the fifth constitutional.

Capanema died from COVID-19 on 20 June 2020, at the age of 82, amidst the COVID-19 pandemic in Brazil, after being admitted to a hospital in Rio de Janeiro for almost three months due to an infection with the new coronavirus.
