= Marconi Alencar =

Brazilian politician (1939–2020)

Mayor of Araripe
- In office 1962–1966

Member of the Legislative Assembly of Ceará
- In office 1971–1987

Personal details
- Born: March 21, 1939 Juazeiro do Norte, Ceará, Brazil
- Died: June 21, 2020 (aged 81) Fortaleza, Ceará, Brazil
- Party: Democratic Social Party (PDS)
- Other political affiliations: ARENA (former)
- Profession: Politician

Marconi José Figueiredo de Alencar (21 March 1939 – 21 June 2020), better known simply as Marconi Alencar, was a Brazilian politician from the state of Ceará.

== Career ==
Between 1962 and 1966, Alencar acted as Mayor of Araripe.

In 1970, Alencar was elected Member of the Legislative Assembly of Ceará. He remained in power from 1971 to 1975.

In 1974, he was re-elected State Deputy and kept his post from 1975 to 1979.

In 1978, he was elected State Deputy for the third consecutive time. His third tenure lasted from 1979 to 1983.

In 1982, Alencar was elected State Deputy for the fourth and last time. This time remaining in charge from 1983 to 1987.

== Death ==
On 21 June 2020, Alencar died in Fortaleza at the age of 81 due to complications brought on by COVID-19 during the COVID-19 pandemic in Brazil.
