= Quinto constitucional =

Quinto Constitucional, or "Constitutional Fifth", is a rule defined by article 94 of the Brazilian Constitution according to which one-fifth of seats in the Federal Regional Courts, State Courts, and the Federal District and of the Territories Court are filled by public prosecutors (Ministério Público), and by lawyers with more than 10 years of professional experience, who then leave their current positions to assume office.

The selection process starts with lists, usually of six members, appointed by the bar association (OAB) or the Prosecutor's Office, which is pruned to three by vote on the court the appointee is to serve in. The list is then submitted to the head of the executive: The president in the case of Federal Regional Courts and the Federal District and Territories Court, or the respective governor in case of a State Court, who usually appoints the highest voted.

A similar rule applies to the Superior Tribunal de Justiça, where a third of justices are also former public prosecutors and lawyers.
