= Melville Y. Stewart =

American philosopher (1935–2020)

Melville Y. Stewart (June 19, 1935 – June 19, 2020) was an American Philosopher and Professor of Philosophy Emeritus at Bethel University, Minnesota.

== Bibliography ==
- The Greater-Good Defence, An Essay on the Rationality of Faith, author, London:Macmillan//New York: St. Martin's, 1993. ISBN 0-312-08095-6.
- Проблемы Христианской Философии (Problems in Christian Philosophy), co-editor with Dan Clendenin, Moscow: Progress Academy Press, 1994. ISBN 5-85864-071-0.
- Philosophy of Religion, An Anthology of Contemporary Views, editor, in the Jones and Bartlett Series in Philosophy, second printing, Wadsworth Press, 1996. ISBN 0-86720-512-1.
- 《当代西方宗教哲学》, (Philosophy of Religion, An Anthology of Contemporary Views), Melville Y. Stewart, editor, Beijing: Peking University Press, 2005, ISBN 7-301-04731-2.
- 《东西方宗教伦理及其他》(East & West Religious Ethics and Other Essays), co-editor with Zhang Zhigang, Beijing: Central Compilation and Translation Press, 1997. ISBN 7-80109-198-1
- The Symposium of Chinese-American Philosophy and Religious Studies: Volume 1, East & West Philosophy of Religion, co-editor with Zhang Zhigang, Bethesda: International Scholars Publications, 1998. ISBN 1-57309-260-6.
- Искупление (The Atonement), co-editor with Natalia Pecherskaya, St. Petersburg: St. Petersburg School of Religion and Philosophy Publishers, 1999. ISBN 5-900291-14-6.
- 《欧美哲学与宗教讲演录》(Lectures on European and American Philosophy and Religion), co-editor with Zhao Dunhua, Beijing: Peking University Press, 1998. ISBN 7-301-03657-4.
- The Trinity: East/West Dialogue, Dordrecht: Kluwer, 2003, editor. ISBN 1-4020-1728-6.
- Пресвятая Троица, Russian edition, Alexander Kierlezhev editor, 2001.
- 《科学与宗教的对话》(A Dialogue Between Science and Religion), co-editor with Zhou Jianzhang and Kelly James Clark, Xiamen: Xiamen University Press, 2002. ISBN 7-5615-1989-3
- 《跨宗教对话:中国与西方》(Interfaith Dialogue: East and West), co-editor with Fu Youde and Kelly James Clark, Beijing: Social Science Publishers, 2004. ISBN 7-5004-4201-7/B.
- Philosophy of Religion, Beijing: co-editor with Xing Taotao, Beijing: Peking University Press, 2005. ISBN 7-301-09572-4
- Science and Religion in Dialogue, Hao Changchi, Melville Y. Stewart, editors, Asia Humanities Press
- 《科学与宗教的对话》(Science and Religion in Dialogue), Vol. 1, co-editor with Hao Changchi, Beijing: Peking University Press, 2007. ISBN 978-7-301-12811-4.
- 《科学与宗教：二十一 世纪时对话》(Science and Religion: 21st Century Dialogue), Vol. 2, co-editor with Xu Yingjin, Shanghai: Fudan University Press, 2008. ISBN 978-7-309-06310-3.
- Science and Religion in Dialogue, editor, Volume One, Oxford: Wiley-Blackwell Publishing, 2010. ISBN 978-1-4051-8921-7.
- Science and Religion in Dialogue, editor, Volume Two, Oxford: Wiley-Blackwell Publishing, 2010. ISBN 978-1-4051-8921-7.
- Dictionary of Western Philosophy, English/Pinyin/Chinese, co-author with Xu Yingjin, Beijing: Peking University Press, 2009. ISBN 978-7-301-16393-1.
- 《科学与宗教：当前对话》(Science and Religion: Current Dialogue), Vol. 3, co-editor with Fu Youde, Beijing: Peking University Press, 2011. ISBN 978-7-301-12811-4.
- 《科学与宗教：二十一 世纪问题》(Science and Religion: 21st Century Issues), Vol. 4, co-editor with Xing Taotao and Xiangdong Xu, Beijing: Peking University Press, 2015. ISBN 978-7-301-25849-1
- 《科学与宗教：当前争论》(Science and Religion: Current Debate), Vol. 5, co-editor with Zhu Donghua, Beijing: Peking University Press, 2014. ISBN 978-7-301-24667-2.
- 《Наука и Религия в Диалоге (Science and Religion in Dialogue)》, Vol. 1, Natalia Pecherskaya and Melville Y. Stewart, editors, St. Petersburg, St. Petersburg School of Religion and Philosophy Publisher, 2014, ISBN 978-5-900291-32-1.
- 《Наука и Религия в Диалоге (Science and Religion in Dialogue)》, Vol. 2, St. Natalia Pecherskaya and Melville Y. Stewart, editors, St. Petersburg, St. Petersburg School of Religion and Philosophy Publisher, 2015. ISBN 978-5-900291-33-8.
- 《Наука и Религия в Диалоге (Science and Religion in Dialogue)》Vol. 3, Natalia Pecherskaya and Melville Y. Stewart, editors, St. Petersburg, St. Petersburg School of Religion and Philosophy Publisher, 2016, ISBN 978-5-900291-34-5.
- 《Наука и Религия в Диалоге (Science and Religion in Dialogue)》Vol. 4, Natalia Pecherskaya and Melville Y. Stewart, editors, St. Petersburg, St. Petersburg School of Religion and Philosophy Publisher, 2017, ISBN 978-5-900291-35-2.
