= Malim Ghozali PK =

Malaysian writer (1949–2020)

- محمد غزالي بن عبدالرشيد
- Born: Mohamed Ghazali bin Abdul Rashid; 4 March 1949; Malim Nawar, Perak, Federated Malay States (present day Malaysia)
- Died: 18 June 2020 (aged 71); Serdang Hospital, Selangor, Malaysia
- Education: University of Malaya
- Occupation: Writer
- Spouse: Ratnawati Jamil (m 1994)
- Children: 6
- Writing career
- Pen name: Malim Ghozali PK
- Language: Malay
- Genre: Fiction
- Notable awards: Southeast Asian Writers Award (2013), Sasterawan Perak (2014)

Mohamed Ghazali bin Abdul Rashid, also known by the pen name Malim Ghozali PK (4 March 1949 – 18 June 2020) was a Malaysian writer from Perak. His works include novels and short stories. He received the Southeast Asian Writers Award (SEA Award) in 2013.

== Early life and education ==
Mohamed Ghazali bin Abdul Rashid was born in Malim Nawar, Perak on 4 March 1949.

He began his studies at Sekolah Melayu Gunung Panjang before continuing his studies at Sekolah Menengah Anderson Ipoh. He then went on to graduate from the University of Malaya and graduated with a Bachelor of Arts in 1973. In addition, he also participated in the Creative Writing Fellowship program at the Center for Creative Arts in Virginia, United States.

== Career and award ==
He received the Southeast Asian Writers Award in 2013 and Sasterawan Perak title in 2014. He was also a nominee for the 14th Malaysian National Scholar Award.

== Death ==
On Thursday, 18 June 2020, he died of cancer at Serdang Hospital, Selangor at 11.20 AM a day after surgery to remove a tumor on his heart.

== Bibliography ==
=== Storybook ===
- (in Malay) Kebenaran Mutlak: Memahami Kesempurnaan. Petaling Jaya: Seladang Ventures. 2006. ISBN 978-983-372-409-3. OCLC 953649167.
- Understanding Perfection: The Profound Truth. Kuala Lumpur: Institut Terjemahan & Buku Malaysia. 2010. ISBN 978-983-372-408-6. OCLC 191659323.
- (in Malay) Kampung-kampung tersohor : di sepanjang Sungai Perak = Famous villages : along the Perak river. Perak: Institut Darul Ridzuan. 2011. ISBN 978-967-016-501-1. OCLC 844990395.
- (in Malay) Hotel Syariah De Palma : Konsep dan Pelaksanaan = De Palma Syariah Compliant Hotels : Concept and Implementation. Petaling Jaya, Selangor: Kumpulan Hotel De Palma. 2011. ISBN 978-967-101-370-0. OCLC 968953821.
- (in Malay) Psikosomatik yang menyala. Kuala Lumpur: Institut Terjemahan & Buku Malaysia. 2017. ISBN 978-967-460-540-7. OCLC 994290850.

=== Novel ===
- (in Malay) Redang. Dewan Bahasa dan Pustaka, Kementerian Pendidikan Malaysia. 1988. ISBN 978-983-620-622-0.
- (in Malay) Janji Paramaribo. Kuala Lumpur: Dewan Bahasa dan Pustaka, Malaysian Ministry of Education. 1990. ISBN 978-983-621-745-5. LCCN 90948293. OCLC 24292708.
- (in Malay) Daun. Kuala Lumpur: Dewan Bahasa dan Pustaka. 2008. ISBN 978-983-460-082-2. OCLC 318943020.
- (in Malay) Luka Nering. Kuala Lumpur: Dewan Bahasa dan Pustaka. 2014. ISBN 978-983-461-927-5. OCLC 913514540.
- Tree of Sorrow. Kuala Lumpur: Dewan Bahasa dan Pustaka. 2014. ISBN 978-983-490-065-6. OCLC 913514570.
- Song of September: A Collection of Short Stories. Kuala Lumpur: Institut Terjemahan & Buku Malaysia. 2016. ISBN 978-967-460-398-4.
- (in Malay) Song of September: Kumpulan Cerpen. Kuala Lumpur: Institut Terjemahan & Buku Malaysia. 2017. ISBN 978-967-460-544-5. OCLC 993663759.

=== Collections and anthologies ===
- (in Malay) Gemaruang. Ampang Jaya: OEN Industries. 1987. ISBN 978-983-957-400-5. OCLC 851049148.
- (in Malay) Sayang Ottawa Sungainya Sejuk. Kuala Lumpur: Dewan Bahasa dan Pustaka, Kementerian Pendidikan Malaysia. 1989. ISBN 978-983-620-899-6. OCLC 420743168.
- (in Malay) Usia. Petaling Jaya: Seladang Books. 2006. ISBN 978-983-372-400-0. LCCN 2007442906. OCLC 193863617.
- (in Malay) Fantasi Malam. 2007.
- (in Malay) hujan di limun pagi. Selangor: Seladang Ventures. 2008. ISBN 978-983-372-413-0. OCLC 968939803.
- (in Malay) Ini Chow Kit Road, Sudilah Mampir!. Kuala Lumpur: Seladang Ventures. 2008. ISBN 978-983-372-412-3. LCCN 2011307729.
- (in Malay) Langit Tidak Berbintang di Ulu Slim. Kuala Lumpur: Dewan Bahasa dan Pustaka. 2014. ISBN 978-983-461-697-7. OCLC 913573182.
- (in Malay) Malim Nawar Telah Kupinjam Namamu. Kuala Lumpur: Dewan Bahasa dan Pustaka. 2017. ISBN 978-983-490-899-7. OCLC 985069930.
- (in Malay) Tanah, Air, Api, Angin. Kuala Lumpur: Seladang Ventures Sdn. Bhd. 2017. ISBN 978-967-148-331-2. OCLC 1014001528.

=== Translations ===
- (in Malay) Noordin Hassan (2009). The Frankincense: Selected Plays [Mana setangginya? Kumpulan Drama Pilihan]. Translated by Malim Ghozali PK; Mohd Bahadun. Kuala Lumpur: Institut Terjemahan Negara Malaysia Berhad. ISBN 978-983-068-441-3. OCLC 500468164.

=== Articles ===
- (in Malay) Masyarakat rumpun Melayu di Surinam : sebuah nostalgia nusantara. 1990. OCLC 968961902.
- (in Malay) Pencarian kendiri bangsa dalam Sajak-Sajak Sejarah Melayu karya SN Muhammad Hj. Salleh. 2010. OCLC 969566443.
