= Charlotte Gardner =

American politician (1931–2020)

Charlotte Ancher Gardner (November 14, 1931 – June 10, 2020) was an American politician and educator.

Gardner was born in Baltimore, Maryland. She moved with her family to Rockwell, North Carolina and graduated from Rockwell High School. Gardner graduated from Catawba College. She taught high school and lived in Salisbury, North Carolina with her husband and family. Gardner served in the North Carolina House of Representatives from 1985 to 2001 and was a Republican. Gardner died in Kannapolis, North Carolina.
