= Renato de Jesus =

Brazilian politician (1963–2020)

City councilor of Belford Roxo
- In office 1993–1995

Member of the Legislative Assembly of Rio de Janeiro
- In office 1995–2002
- In office 1 January 2005 – 2006
- In office 14 August 2008 – 2010

Personal details
- Born: February 27, 1963 Rio de Janeiro, Rio de Janeiro, Brazil
- Died: June 15, 2020 (aged 57) Rio de Janeiro, Rio de Janeiro, Brazil
- Party: Liberal Party (PR)
- Other political affiliations: PMDB (former); PSDB (former); PP (former)
- Profession: Politician

José Renato de Jesus (27 February 1963 – 15 June 2020), better known simply as Renato de Jesus, was a Brazilian politician from the state of Rio de Janeiro.

== Career ==
De Jesus started his political career in 1992 when he was elected City councilor of Belford Roxo. He remained in City council from 1993 to 1995.

In 1994, he decided to run and was later elected Member of the Legislative Assembly of Rio de Janeiro. He kept his post as a State Deputy for two consecutive tenures between 1995 and 2002 after being re-elected once in 1998.

In 2002, he unsuccessfully attempted re-election. Although he failed to secure enough votes to be directly elected, he was appointed suplente, a substitute Deputy that only takes office if a permanent or temporary vacancy within this coalition occurs.

On 1 January 2005, he took office as a State Deputy due to the permanent vacancy of fellow Deputy Otavio Leite, who resigned after being elected Vice mayor of Rio de Janeiro. This time, De Jesus remained in power between 2005 and 2006.

In 2006, De Jesus failed to be directly elected and once again was appointed suplente.

On 14 August 2008, he once again took office as a State Deputy due to a permanent vacancy. This time he succeeded Álvaro Lins, impeached due to a corruption scandal.

In 2010 and 2014 he failed to be directly elected and was appointed suplente on both occasions. Both times however, no vacancy occurred within his coalition.

His political career ended after he decided to not run at the 2018 elections.

== Death ==
On 15 June 2020, De Jesus died in Rio de Janeiro due to complications brought on by COVID-19 during the COVID-19 pandemic in Brazil.
