= Jayamohan Thampi =

Indian cricketer (1956–2020)

Personal information
- Born: 10 April 1956
- Died: 6 June 2020 (aged 64)
- Batting: Right-handed
- Role: Wicket-keeper
- Source: ESPNcricinfo, 12 June 2020

Jayamohan Thampi (10 April 1956 – 6 June 2020) was an Indian cricketer who played in six first-class matches for Kerala between 1979 and 1982. He died from a head injury, with his son later arrested and charged with his murder.
