= José Gentil Rosa =

Brazilian politician (1940–2020)

Zé Gentil

City councilor of Caxias
- In office 1983–1987

Member of the Legislative Assembly of Maranhão
- In office 1987–1991
- In office 1995–1999
- In office 2019 – June 15, 2020

Personal details
- Born: May 18, 1940 Caxias, Maranhão, Brazil
- Died: June 15, 2020 (aged 80) Teresina, Piauí, Brazil
- Party: Republicans (Brazil) (PRB)
- Other political affiliations: PTB (former); PSC (former); PSDC (former)
- Profession: Politician, businessman

José Gentil Rosa (18 May 1940 – 15 June 2020), better known simply as Zé Gentil, was a Brazilian politician and businessman from the state of Maranhão.

== Career ==
Gentil started his political career in 1982 when he ran for a spot as City councilor of his birth city of Caxias. He secured enough votes for election and remained in City council from 1983 to 1987.

In 1986, he was elected Member of the Legislative Assembly of Maranhão. He kept his position from 1987 to 1991.

In 1994, Gentil was again elected for the Legislative Assembly of Maranhão. His second tenure lasted from 1995 to 1999.

In 2018, he was elected State Deputy for the third and last time. He remained in power from 2019 to his death.

== Personal life and death ==
Gentil had four sons, one of them, Flávio Gentil is also a politician and the incumbent Mayor of Caxias.

On 15 June 12020, Gentil died in Teresina at the age of 80 due to complications brought on by COVID-19 during the COVID-19 pandemic in Brazil.
