= Ralph M. Winge =

American politician (1925–2020)

Member of the North Dakota House of Representatives from the 24th district
- In office 1959–1968
- In office 1971–1978

Personal details
- Born: August 25, 1925 Van Hook, North Dakota
- Died: June 12, 2020 (aged 94) Bismarck, North Dakota
- Party: Democratic
- Profession: Farmer

Ralph Milton Winge (August 25, 1925 - June 12, 2020), was an American politician who was a member of the North Dakota House of Representatives. He represented the 24th district from 1959 to 1968 and from 1971 to 1978 as a member of the Democratic party. An alumnus of the North Dakota State University (B.Sc. Agricultural Economics), he was a farmer.
