= Esther Eskens =

Wyoming politician

Member of the Wyoming House of Representatives
- In office 1975–1982

Personal details
- Born: November 30, 1924 Manhattan, Kansas
- Died: June 4, 2020 (aged 95) Denver, Colorado

Esther Eskens (November 30, 1924 - June 4, 2020) was an American Republican politician from Lovell, Wyoming. She represented the Big Horn district in the Wyoming House of Representatives from 1975 to 1978 and the Natrona district in 1982.
