= Riaz Sheikh =

Pakistani cricketer (1968–2020)

Personal information
- Born: 24 December 1968; Karachi, Pakistan
- Died: 2 June 2020 (aged 51); Karachi, Pakistan
- Source: Cricinfo, 8 June 2020

Riaz Sheikh (24 December 1968 – 2 June 2020) was a Pakistani cricketer. He played in 43 first-class and 25 List A matches between 1986 and 2005, and was once considered for selection to the national team. He was believed to have contracted the COVID-19 virus and died in Karachi, but he was buried before this could be confirmed.
