= Doris Jones-Baker =

British-American historian and folklorist (c.1926–2020)

Doris Jones-Baker FSA FRSA
- Doris Jones-Baker in her house in 2013
- Born: 1925 or 1926
- Died: 7 June 2020 (aged 94)
- Occupations: Historian; Folklorist

Academic work
- Discipline: History; Folklore
- Sub-discipline: Medieval history Early modern history Folklore; History of Hertfordshire

Doris Whipple Jones-Baker FSA FRSA (c. 1926–7 June 2020) was a British-American historian and folklorist.

== Career ==
Jones-Baker is a graduate of the University of California and George Washington University. She completed her PhD in history at University College London and held a fellowship at the Fletcher School of Law and Diplomacy.

Doris initially worked for the US State Department as a historian before she moved to England with her husband, Lionel, in 1960. They settled in Whitwell, Hertfordshire.

Jones-Baker published numerous articles and books on Hertfordshire history and folklore and English medieval graffiti. She served on the council of the Hertfordshire Association for Local History, and the East Hertfordshire Archaeological Society. She was a co-editor of Hertfordshire Archaeology and served as a councillor and editorial member of the Huguenot Society of Great Britain and Ireland.

She was elected as a fellow of the Society of Antiquaries of London in March 1982 and was also a Fellow of the Royal Society of Arts.

== Select publication ==
- Jones-Baker, D. 1974. Old Hertfordshire Calendar.
- Jones-Baker, D. 1977. The Folklore of Hertfordshire.
- Jones-Baker, D. 1987. Tales of Old Hertfordshire.
- Jones-Baker, D. 1989. "Graffito drawing of a medieval window, Welbourn Church, Lincolnshire", Antiquaries Journal 69, 312-314.
- Jones-Baker, D. 1990 A history of the Parish Church of St. Paul's Walden, Hertfordshire
- Jones-Baker, D. (ed) 1991. Hertfordshire in History: Papers presented to Lionel Munby.
