= Choi Suk-hyeon =

South Korean triathlete (1998–2020)

Personal information
- Nationality: South Korean
- Born: 8 June 1998 Chilgok, North Gyeongsang, South Korea
- Died: 26 June 2020 (aged 22) Busan, South Korea
- Occupation: Triathlete
- Years active: 2009–2020

Sport
- Country: South Korean
- Sport: Triathlon

Choi Suk-hyeon (Korean: 최숙현; 8 June 1998 – 26 June 2020) was a South Korean triathlete. She won the bronze medal in the junior event at the 2015 Asian triathlon championships. She finished fourth in the elite event at the 2016 national championships. In 2020, she committed suicide after years of abuse by her coaches.

She was a member of the competitive society based in Busan. In April 2020, she complained to the Korean Sport and Olympic Committee (KSOC) about the fact that she was abused, seeking an investigation. She also sought help at several public institutions, but was not successful. She had audio recordings of physical abuse. She was being beaten by her team officials. She received punishment because she couldn't control her weight; she was starved or put on an inhuman diet.

On 2 July, it was announced that in June 2020, Choi Suk-hyeon committed suicide. The news was picked up by media worldwide.

After the announcement of her death the KSOC denied in a press release it had ignored her complaint. KSOC stated it had assigned a female investigator after receiving Choi's plea. It stated that it would take "stern measures" against those involved, expressing "profound regret" over her death and that prosecutors are now looking into the case.

On 2 July, the day of the announcement, a petition posted on South Korea's presidential office website demanding a serious investigation had over 5000 signatures by mid-morning.
