= Ismail Ibrahim =

Pakistani cricketer (1932–2020)

Personal information
- Born: 4 August 1932; Mangrol, Gujarat, India
- Died: 15 June 2020 (aged 87); Scunthorpe, England
- Source: Cricinfo, 17 April 2021

Ismail Ibrahim (4 August 1932 – 15 June 2020) was a Pakistani cricketer. He played in eight first-class matches for Karachi from 1954/55 to 1957/58.

== Early life and education ==
Ibrahim was born in Mangrol, a coastal town in the Junagadh district of Gujarat, into a Gujarati-speaking family involved in farming and the fruit trade. During his school years at Madrassah High School and Jehangir Boarding House, where he studied with his older brother Hasan, Ibrahim played cricket and field hockey and was selected for a local squad by Nawab Dilwar Khan.

After the partition of India in 1947, Ibrahim traveled by sea to Karachi while awaiting his matriculation results and enrolled in a typing and shorthand course. His proficiency in English led to his employment with Sher Mohammad Ali & Sons, a surgical tools wholesaler.

== Career ==
In 1951, after a brief hiatus from cricket, he was invited by Prince Aslam to join the Kathiawar Gymkhana and later played for Pak Ahmedabad under M. S. Baloch; his performance was noted by teammates including Mohammad Farooq.

Ibrahim's club performances resulted in his selection by the Karachi Cricket Association in 1954. He made his first-class debut in the 1954–55 Quaid-e-Azam Trophy semi-final and was selected for the 1955 Pakistan Eaglets tour of the United Kingdom, a developmental initiative.

After returning to Pakistan, Ibrahim played in domestic cricket for teams including Karachi Blues and Karachi C. He scored runs and took wickets, with a career-best bowling figure of 5 for 54 recorded in one match.

In 1958, Ibrahim moved to Scunthorpe, Lincolnshire, in the United Kingdom to pursue career. He represented Appleby-Frodingham Works for four summers, serving as an opening bowler and batsman. In club cricket, he recorded a five-wicket haul against Scunthorpe Town and scored a rapid century against English Steel.
