= Mário Calixto Filho =

Brazilian politician (1946–2020)

Senator for Rondônia
- In office July 13, 2004 – March 23, 2005

Personal details
- Born: August 9, 1946 Arcos, Minas Gerais, Brazil
- Died: June 17, 2020 (aged 73) Porto Velho, Rondônia, Brazil
- Party: Brazilian Democratic Movement (PMDB)
- Profession: Politician, journalist, businessman

Mário Calixto Filho (August 9, 1946 – June 17, 2020) was a Brazilian politician, journalist and businessman from the state of Minas Gerais who represented the state of Rondônia at national level.

== Career ==
In 2004, Calixto took office as a senator representing the state of Rondônia due to a vacancy. Fellow senator Amir Lando left his position to be Minister of Social Security and Calixto, as his first suplente, took office as senator during his absence. His term went from July 13, 2004, to March 23, 2005.

=== Legal problems ===
On July 22, 2015, Calixto was arrested by the Federal Police of Brazil in Balneário Camboriú. He was convicted of government procurement fraud and was sentenced to 12 years in prison. At the time of his arrest, he was a fugitive from justice and had his name included on Interpol's wanted list.

in June 2017, he was convicted of money forgery and criminal association and sentenced to five years in jail.

== Death ==
On June 17, 2020, Calixto died in Porto Velho at the age of 73 due to complications brought on by COVID-19 which he acquired while in prison during the COVID-19 pandemic in Brazil.
