= Pieter van der Kruk =

Dutch sportsman (1941–2020)

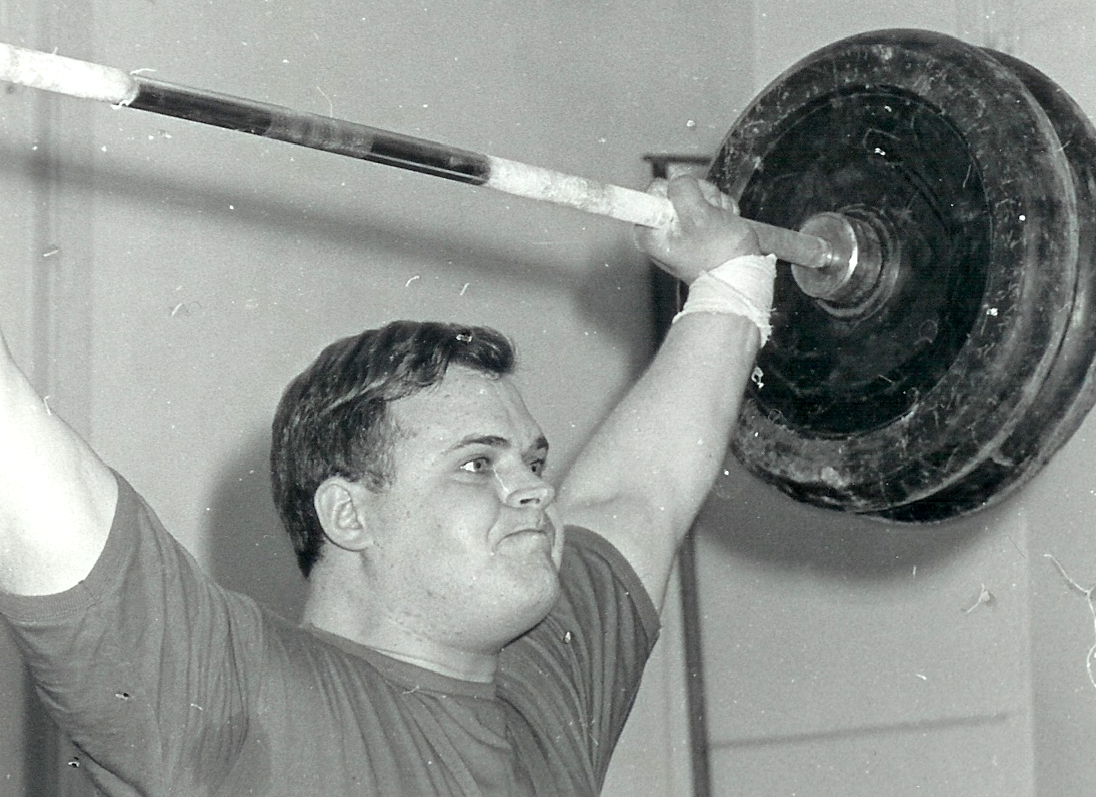

Personal information
- Born: 13 August 1941 Delft, Netherlands
- Died: 4 June 2020 (aged 78) Delft
- Height: 1.88 m (6 ft 2 in)
- Weight: 131 kg (289 lb)

Sport
- Sport: Weightlifting, athletics
- Event(s): Shot put, discus throw

Achievements and titles
- Personal best: SP – 17.09 m (1967)

Pieter "Piet" van der Kruk (13 August 1941 – 4 June 2020) was a Dutch heavyweight weightlifter and shot putter. He won five national weightlifting titles (1964, 1965, 1967–1969) and four shot put titles (1964, 1965, 1967 and 1969), and held the national shot put record from 1967 to 1976. He qualified for the 1968 Summer Olympics both as a shot putter and weightlifter; he chose to compete in weightlifting only and finished in ninth place.

After retiring from competitions van der Kruk worked as a national weightlifting coach. From 1988 to 1998 he was a member of the Dutch Olympic Committee, and between 1998 and 2002 headed the Dutch antidoping organization NeCeDo (Nederlands Centrum voor Dopingvraagstukken) in Rotterdam. Later he worked as TV sports commentator with Eurosport.
