= Francis Lagan =

Irish Catholic bishop (1934–2020)

Francis Lagan (31 October 1934 – 9 June 2020) was an Irish prelate of the Roman Catholic Church who served as Auxiliary Bishop of the Diocese of Derry (1988–2010).

== Biography ==
Lagan was born in Lisnamuck, Maghera, County Londonderry, one of seven children born to Francis and Róisín Lagan. He was ordained a priest on 19 June 1960 in Maynooth College, for the Diocese of Derry.

His ministry in the diocese began with teaching appointments at his alma mater, St Columb's College, Derry (1961–63), Carndonagh College (1963-73), and Carndonagh Community School (1973–77). He served as a curate in Strabane (1977–82) and as Administrator at St. Mary's Parish, Creggan in Derry City (1982–88).

On 4 February 1988, he was appointed auxiliary bishop for the diocese and Titular Bishop of Sidnacestre. He was consecrated as bishop on 20 March, of the same year. The Principal Consecrator was Tomás Cardinal O'Fiaich. The principal co-Consecrators were Archbishop Gaetano Alibrandi, the Apostolic Nuncio to Ireland, and Bishop Edward Daly of the Diocese of Derry.

For almost his entire episcopal ministry he lived in Strabane, County Tyrone and assisted the Bishop of Derry with confirmations. His resignation was accepted in May 2010. He died on 9 June 2020, aged 85.
