= Ronald Tackmann =

American painter and sculptor

- Born: Ronald William Tackmann; October 1, 1953; Manhattan, New York, U.S.
- Died: June 13, 2020 (aged 66); The Bronx, New York, U.S.
- Occupations: Painter, sculptor

Ronald William Tackmann (October 1, 1953 – June 13, 2020) was an American painter and sculptor.

== Life and career ==
Tackmann was born in Manhattan, New York, the son of William Tackmann, an executive of the New York Jets, and Genevieve Latko Devine. He was raised in Queens, New York by his aunt and uncle, and he dropped out of high school. He received over 50 arrests within 40 years, and from 2007 to 2008, he committed over five robberies. He was sent Rikers Island in 2009, after he escaped from the Manhattan Criminal Courthouse, slipping out of a gated corridor while wearing a "three-piece suit".

As a self-taught painter and sculptor at Rikers Island, Tackmann created sculptures out of prison soap and toilet paper. He used food coloring to paint, and used his own hair to create paintbrushes. He was named a "career criminal" by New York in 2009, and in January 2020, he was given a compassionate release from the Mohawk Correctional Facility after he was diagnosed with liver cancer.

== Death ==
Tackmann died from liver cancer in a hospice on June 13, 2020, in The Bronx, New York, at the age of 66.
