= Albert Vitali =

Swiss politician (1955–2020)

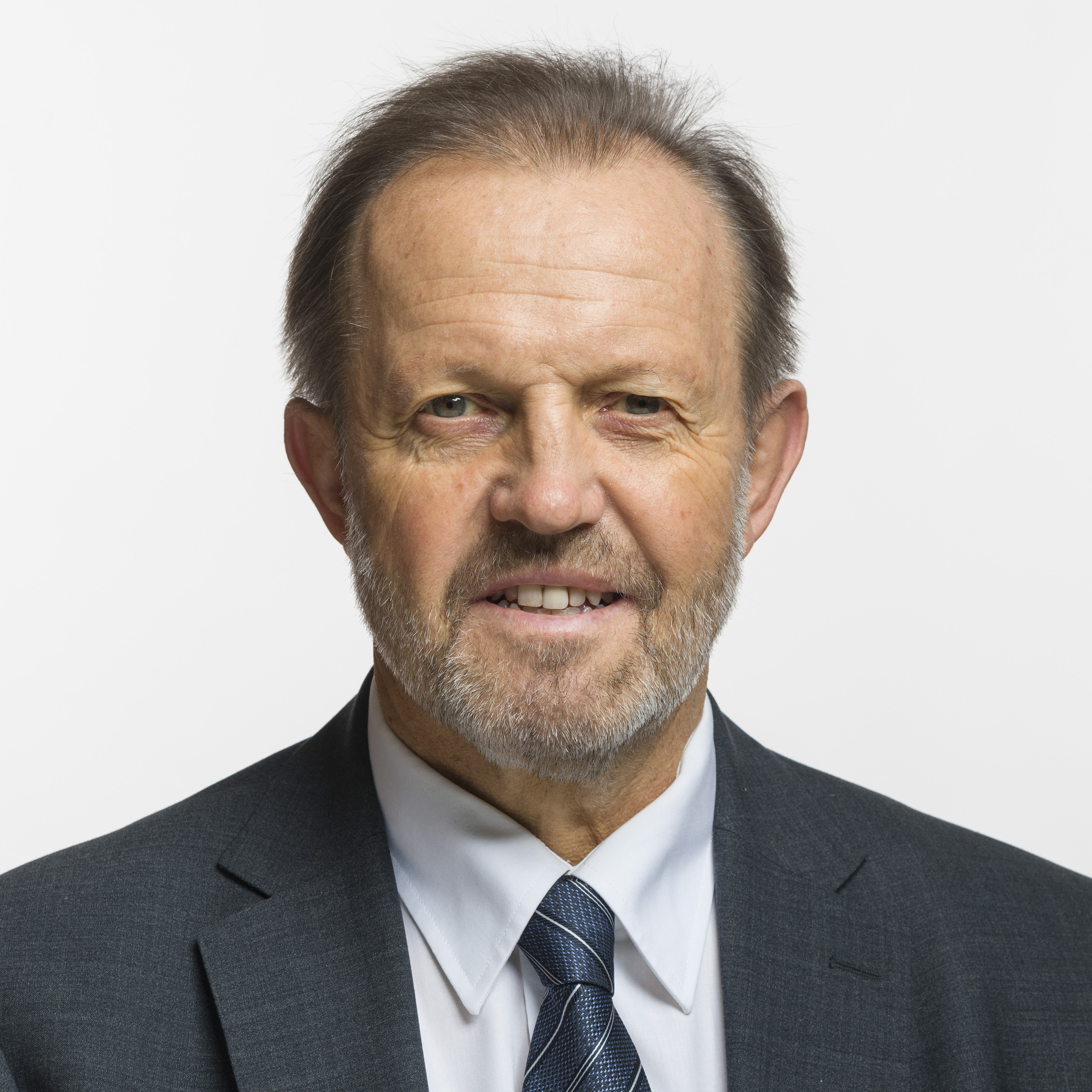
- Vitali in 2019

Member of the Cantonal Parliament of the Canton of Lucerne
- In office June 1995 – May 2011

Member of the Swiss National Council
- In office 5 December 2011 – 12 June 2020

Personal details
- Born: 26 June 1955 Oberkirch, Switzerland
- Died: 12 June 2020 (aged 64)
- Party: FDP

Albert Vitali (26 June 1955 – 12 June 2020) was a Swiss politician.

== Biography ==
Vitali began his career as an apprentice carpenter. He completed business school in 1979 and worked in insurance. From 1997 to 2007, he was a manager for a small enterprise.

Vitali served as a municipal councillor for Oberkirch from 1982 to 2001. He then joined the Grand Council of the Canton of Lucerne, serving from June 1995 to May 2011. He was elected to the National Council in the 2011 Swiss federal election, where he sat on the Commission of Finances. He was re-elected in 2015, and served until his death on 12 June 2020 from cancer.
