= David Pickles =

English cricketer (1935–2020)

Personal information
- Born: 16 November 1935; Halifax, Yorkshire, England
- Died: 22 June 2020 (aged 84)
- Batting: Right-handed
- Bowling: Right-arm fast

Domestic team information
- Years: Team
- 1957–1960: Yorkshire

Career statistics
| Competition | First-class |
|---|---|
| Matches | 41 |
| Runs scored | 74 |
| Batting average | 3.70 |
| 100s/50s | 0/0 |
| Top score | 12 |
| Balls bowled | 4307 |
| Wickets | 96 |
| Bowling average | 21.47 |
| 5 wickets in innings | 4 |
| 10 wickets in match | 1 |
| Best bowling | 7/61 |
| Catches/stumpings | 10/– |
- Source: Cricinfo, 9 January 2021

David Pickles (16 November 1935 – 22 June 2020) was an English first-class cricketer, who played in 41 matches for Yorkshire from 1957 to 1960. He also played for the Yorkshire Second XI during this time.

A right-arm fast bowler, Pickles took 96 wickets at 21.47, with best match figures of 7 for 61 and 5 for 72 against Somerset at Taunton in 1957. He took 5 for 42 in a Roses Match against Lancashire in 1958.

He and his wife Jill had three children. He died at home in Yorkshire on 22 June 2020, aged 84.
