= Simon Kverndal =

British barrister (died 2020)

Simon Kverndal QC (died 14 June 2020) was a British barrister specialising in maritime law.
