= Earl Brown (general) =

United States Air Force general (1927–2020)

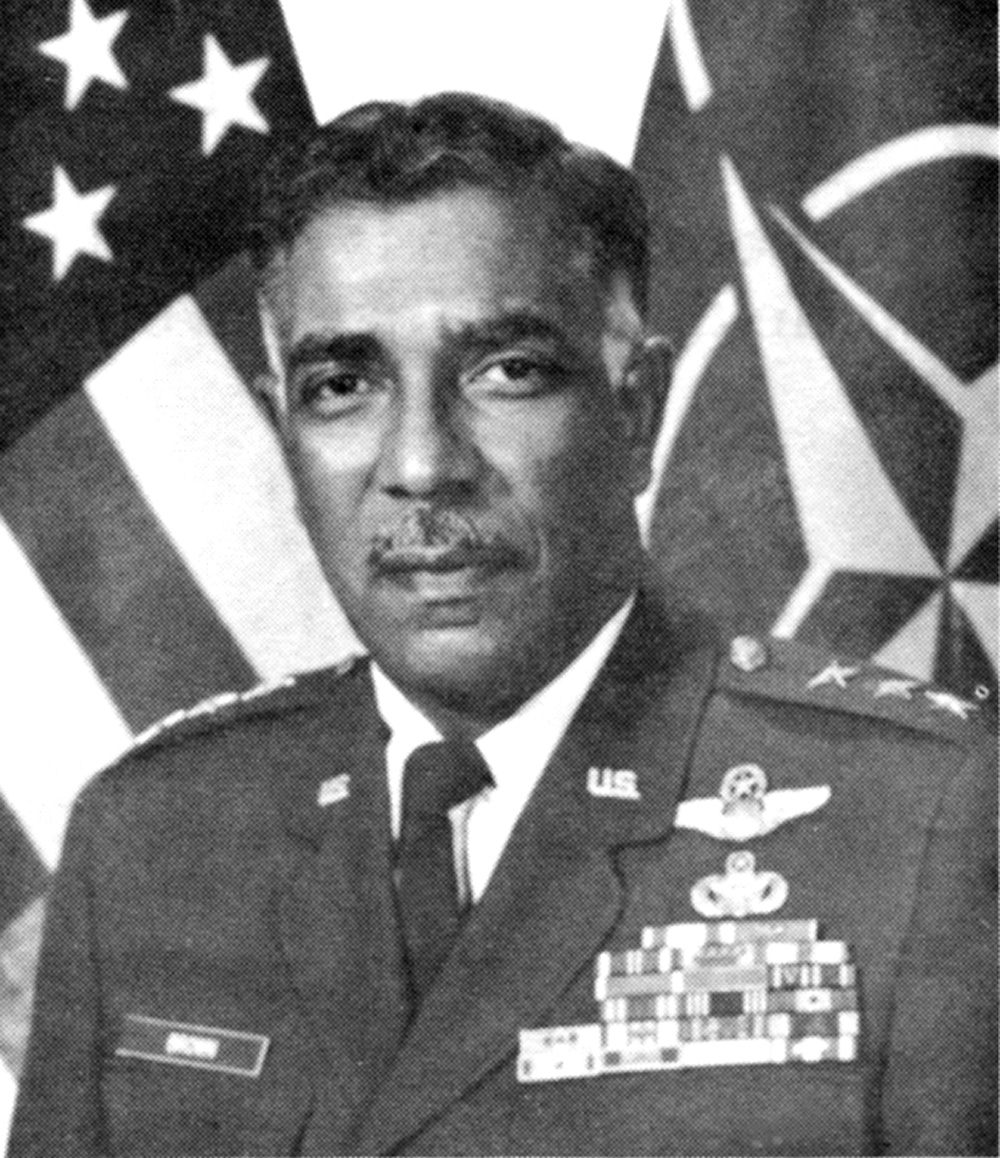
- Born: December 5, 1927; The Bronx, New York City, US
- Died: June 4, 2020 (aged 92); Potomac Falls, Virginia, US
- Military career
- Allegiance: United States of America
- Branch: United States Air Force
- Service years: 1951–1984
- Rank: Lieutenant general
- Awards: Distinguished Service Medal, Legion of Merit with two oak leaf clusters, Distinguished Flying Cross with oak leaf cluster, Air Medal with four oak leaf clusters, Air Force Commendation Medal with oak leaf cluster, Purple Heart

William Earl Brown Jr. (December 5, 1927 – June 4, 2020) was a lieutenant general in the United States Air Force who served as commander of Allied Air Forces Southern Europe and deputy commander in chief, U.S. Air Forces in Europe for the Southern Area, with headquarters in Naples, Italy.

Brown was born in the Bronx, New York, in 1927. He graduated from Dwight Morrow High School, Englewood, New Jersey, in 1945 and received a Bachelor of Science degree from Pennsylvania State University in 1949. He has done graduate work in systems management at the University of Southern California and attended Harvard Business School's six-week advanced management program. He graduated from Squadron Officer School at Maxwell Air Force Base, Alabama, in 1956; Armed Forces Staff College, Norfolk, Virginia, in 1966; and the Industrial College of the Armed Forces, Fort Lesley J. McNair, Washington, D.C., in 1973.

Brown was commissioned in December 1951 at Craig Air Force Base, Alabama, after completing pilot training as a distinguished graduate. His first assignment was to Williams Air Force Base, Arizona, as a student in the F-80 Shooting Star jet transition program.

From 1952 to 1970, Brown served principally in fighter aircraft in various squadron, wing and numbered air force positions. He flew 125 combat missions in F-86 Sabrejets with the 4th Fighter-Interceptor Wing in South Korea and another 100 combat missions in F-4 Phantoms during tours of duty in Thailand at Ubon Royal Thai Air Force Base in 1966 and Udorn Royal Thai Air Force Base in 1969. He also served overseas in Spain and Germany.

In January 1971 he was assigned to the Department of Defense Manpower and Reserve Affairs Office at the Pentagon, serving as special assistant for domestic actions to the assistant secretary of defense.

Brown went to Reese Air Force Base, Texas, in 1973 as deputy commander for operations, 64th Flying Training Wing. He was subsequently assigned to Williams Air Force Base, first as base commander and then as commander of the 82nd Flying Training Wing. In February 1975, Brown took command of the 1st Composite Wing, Military Airlift Command, Andrews Air Force Base, Maryland.

Moving to Bolling Air Force Base, D.C., in June 1977, Brown was named chief of Security Police, Headquarters U.S. Air Force. From October 1978 to July 1980, he served as commander of the Air Defense Weapons Center, Tyndall Air Force Base, Fla. Brown transferred to Sembach Air Base, Germany, in July 1980, as commander of the 17th Air Force.

He is a command pilot with more than 5,100 flying hours. His military decorations and awards include the Distinguished Service Medal, Legion of Merit with two oak leaf clusters, Distinguished Flying Cross with oak leaf cluster, Air Medal with four oak leaf clusters, Air Force Commendation Medal with oak leaf cluster and Purple Heart. He received a Distinguished Alumni Award from Pennsylvania State University in 1981, the highest order of recognition given by the university.

He was promoted to lieutenant general on September 15, 1982, and retired on December 1, 1984. Brown died on June 4, 2020.
