= James Holland (New Hampshire politician) =

American politician (1938–2020)

James F. Holland (September 24, 1938 – June 10, 2020) was an American politician.

Holland was born in Nashua, New Hampshire, where he graduated from Nashua High School. He served in the United States Army during the Vietnam War and later worked on the Nashua Police Force. Holland went on to serve on the Nashua City Council before being elected to the New Hampshire House of Representatives, where he served from 1975 to 1976 as a Republican. He died in Nashua, New Hampshire.
