= Shiraz Dharsi =

Indian-born Pakistani cricketer (1947–2020)

Personal information
- Full name: Shiraz Kassam Dharsi
- Born: 17 April 1947; Bombay, Bombay Presidency, British India
- Died: 23 July 2020 (aged 73); London, England
- Batting: Right-handed
- Role: Wicket-keeper

Domestic team information
- Years: Team
- 1965/66–1970/71: Railways
- 1972/73: Public Works Department
- 1972/73–1973/74: Sind
- 1973/74: Karachi Blues
- 1980: Scotland

Career statistics
Competition	First-class	List A
Matches	49	1
Runs scored	2,288	0
Batting average	32.22	0.00
100s/50s	4/12	–/–
Top score	149	0
Balls bowled	38	–
Wickets	1	–
Bowling average	18.00	–
5 wickets in innings	–	–
10 wickets in match	–	–
Best bowling	1/4	–
Catches/stumpings	67/26	–/–
- Source: Cricinfo, 13 June 2022

Shiraz Kassam Dharsi (17 April 1947 – 23 June 2020) was an Indian-born Pakistani cricketer and teacher.

== Career ==
Dharsi played in 49 first-class matches in India and Pakistan from 1965/66 to 1973/74. He scored more than 2,000 runs in his career.

Dharsi then moved to England and played for Blackpool Cricket Club in the Northern Premier Cricket League as a professional for two seasons in 1975 and 1976, also working as a coach at Rossall School. He later took a PGCE at Durham University and represented the university first team. Following graduation he moved to Scotland to work at Strathallan School as a boarding-house tutor and cricket coach; and made five appearances for the Scotland national team, all in 1980.

Dharsi eventually returned to England, where he worked at Highgate School (1985–1997) as a housemaster, additionally coaching cricket and squash.
