= Mile Nedelkoski =

Macedonian poet (1935–2020)

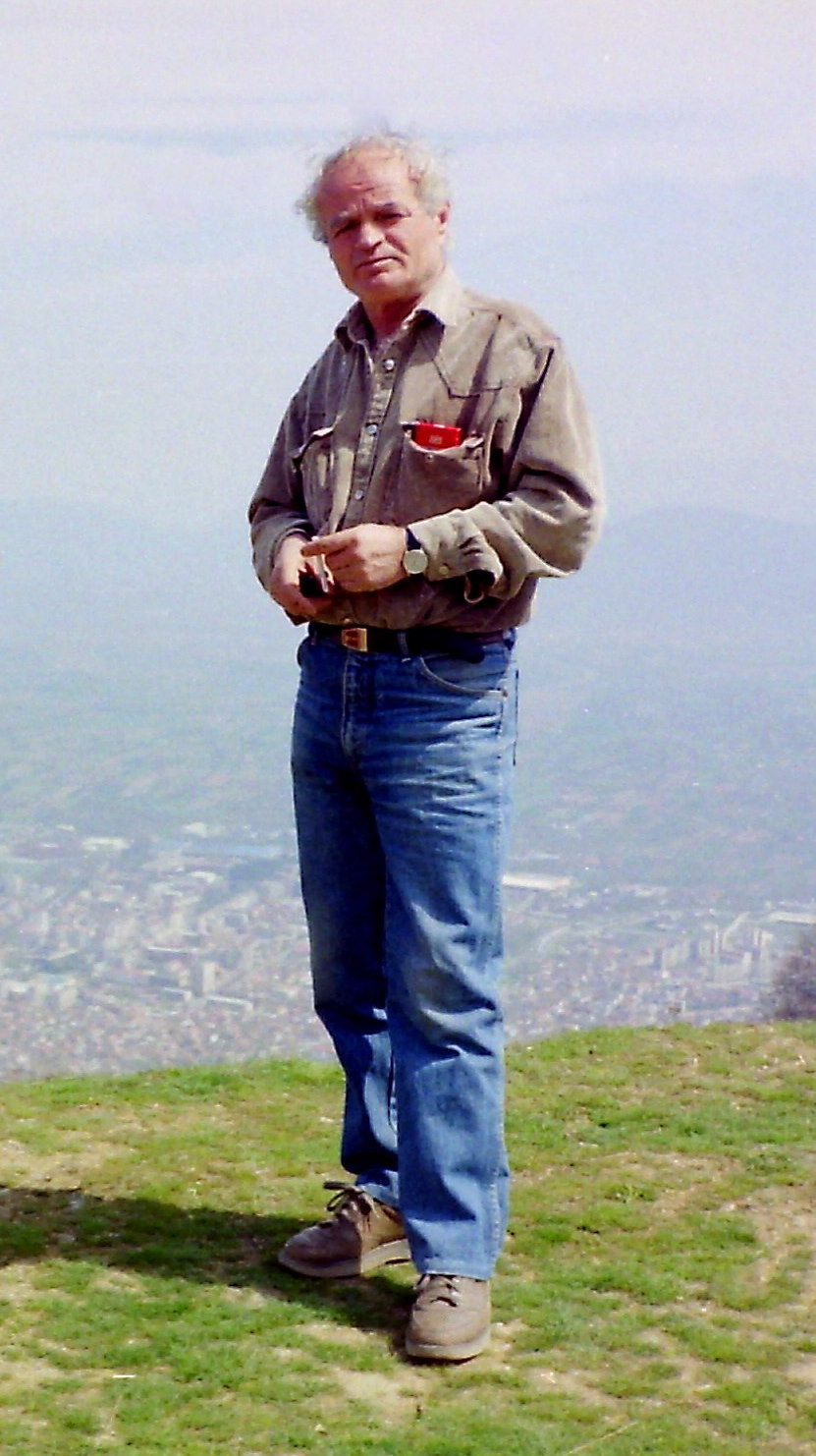
- Born: November 25, 1935; Prilep, Kingdom of Yugoslavia
- Died: June 21, 2020 (aged 84); Skopje, North Macedonia
- Occupation: Writer
- Citizenship: Macedonian

Mile Nedelkoski (Macedonian: Миле Неделкоски; November 25, 1935 – June 21, 2020) was a Macedonian poet, novelist, storyteller, and playwright.

== Biography ==
Nedelkoski was born on November 25, 1935, in Prilep. He served as an editor at Kultura press. He became a member of the Macedonian Writers' Society (Macedonian: Друштво на писателите на Македонија, ДПМ) in 1963. Awards that he received included the Miladinov Brothers Prize, the Kočo Racin Prize, and the Racin Award. According to Macedonian news sources, during the times of Communist Yugoslavia, and allegedly even afterwards, Nedelkovski was spied on by the secret services as a pro-Bulgarian activist. In Bulgaria, he had a reputation for being a bulgarophile intellectual. Nedelkoski died on June 21, 2020, in Skopje.

== Publications ==
- Срце од злато (Heart of Gold; poetry, 1963)
- Јужно лето (Southern Year; poetry, 1964)
- Улавиот од Преспа (The Madman from Prespa; poem, 1965)
- Јавачи на ветар (Riders on the Wind; stories, 1967)
- Пепелаши (Ashes; novel, 1968)
- Еретикон-еротикон (Hereticon-Eroticon; poetry, 1969)
- Трненки (Blackthorns; novel, 1972)
- Триумфот на Тројанскиот коњ (Triumph on a Trojan Horse; play in verse, 1974)
- Пандур (The Pandur; novel, 1982)
- Враќање во арената на стариот прославен, заслужен и ислужен кловн и Пропаста на Олимп (An Old Celebrated Worthy and Weary Clown's Return to the Arena and the Decline of Olympus; plays in verse, 1983)
- Недела ден за каење (Sunday, Day for Repentance; poetry, 1984)
- Битпазар стилски вежби, ете... (poetry, 1984)
- Прозорец што гледа на улица (A Window with a View of the Street)
- Преспански круг со црвена боја и На крепоста чувари (plays, 1985)
- Потковица на смртта и надежта (A Horseshoe of Death and Hope; novel, 1986)
- Петрафил за вечната земја (An Epitrachelion for the Eternal Earth; novel, 1988)
- Подгревање на вчерашниот ручек (Warming Up Yesterday's Lunch; novel, 1988)
- Огледала на сенките (Mirrors of Shadows; poetry, 1989)
- Создателот и старата емигрантка - продавачка на разни плодови (The Creator and the Old Emigrant—A Seller of Various Fruit; novel, 1991)
- Логоманија (Logomania; essays, 1996)
- Празникот на светите маченици (The Feast of the Holy Martyrs; novel, 1996).
