= René Alphonse van den Berghe =

Belgian art dealer (1940–2020)

René Alphonse van den Berghe (Nivelles, 1940 – 19 June 2020), also known as Erik the Belgian (Erik el Belga) has been described by Spain’s Policía Nacional as "an art dealer, restorer, painter, writer and international thief". According to art crime researchers, he was one of the most prolific art thieves in Europe during the 20th century. Between 1977 and 1982, he has admitted to committing thirty robberies, though in likelihood, that number is likely higher. Burglarising primarily Spanish churches and monasteries, alone or with others, he is believed to have been responsible for the theft of thousands of religious artworks.

Although Erik was imprisoned several times, ultimately in Spain for 37 months, the Spanish courts failed to convict him of any art theft. Van den Berghe was a self-proclaimed thief, stating: "I’m no small-time crook. I’m a high-class thief. I have stolen for the love of art and I have stolen luxury items. Money has no luxury value."

On 7 November 1980 van den Berghe stole six Flemish tapestries from a church in the town of Castrojeriz. These tapestries were made in Bruges by Corneille Schutz in 1654. While the tapestries were recovered by an Interpol-led investigation, a section of the La apoteosis de las artes (The Apotheosis of the Arts) was only recently discovered in February 2022. The fragment was returned to the archdiocese of Burgos on 18 February 2022.
