= Bram Kloppert =

Dutch boxer (died 2020)

Bram Kloppert (1946 or 1947 – 13 June 2020) was a Dutch amateur boxer active in the 1960s in the lightweight category. He lived in Rotterdam.

Kloppert was part of the boxing school of Theo Huizenaar with other boxers including Wim Jansen, Carel Jansen, Ada Jansen, Stan van den Driessche, Cor Eversteijn and his 2-year-older brother Wout Kloppert (who became Dutch amateur champion).

When Kloppert was young he played football together with his brother and Stan van den Driessche at “Neptunus”. In September 1965 he was beaten by the British boxer Jimmy Banks, by disqualification. In May 1966 he beat Ab Benyahia. In March 1967 he became champion of South Holland. In the same month he failed to qualify during the quarterfinals of the Dutch national Championships for the semi-finals. Kloppert began his 1967 boxing season well with a victory over Dick de Vos and winning the style prize in Odeon, Rotterdam. A month later he inflicted a heavy knock out in a match against Belgian Werner Blanquaert at the Rivierahal, Rotterdam. In May 1968 he beat the German Krupka.

A few years before his death he had to go to a care home in Schiebroek, and did activities with his son Wesly of his first marriage.

Bram Kloppert died on 13 June 2020, aged 73.
