= Donald James Hall =

American ecologist and academic

Donald James Hall (1935–2020) was a freshwater ecologist and Professor at Michigan State University. He was also the longest-serving director of MSU's Graduate Program in Ecology, Evolution, and Behavior (EEB) from 1989 to 2004.

== Early life and education ==
Hall was born in 1935 in Palo Alto, California. His family later moved to Iowa City, Iowa, and then to Chapel Hill, North Carolina, where he graduated from high school. Hall stayed in Chapel Hill and received his B.A. from the University of North Carolina in 1957, while also being on the swimming team and in the marching band. Hall received M.S. and Ph.D. degrees in zoology from the University of Michigan, followed by a one-year stint as a postdoctoral researcher at the University of Washington, Seattle.

== Career and research ==
In 1963, Hall joined the faculty at Cornell University. He moved to the Department of Zoology at MSU in 1969, was promoted to full professor in 1972, and retired in 2005. Hall did most of his research while at MSU at the Kellogg Biological Station (KBS) located on Gull Lake. Much of his research was done in collaboration with Earl Werner, who was a graduate student at KBS and later on the faculty of the University of Michigan. Several of their papers have been cited many hundreds of times, including two that were named "Citation Classics" by the Institute for Scientific Information. One of the citation classics presented an early experimental test of optimal foraging theory, using the bluegill sunfish, Lepomis macrochirus, as the forager while manipulating the abundance of different size classes of the water flea, Daphnia magna. That paper was also highlighted as a notable paper in the Ecological Society of America's centennial celebration for "significant impacts on the science of ecology."

After Hall’s death, an MSU colleague and later director of the EEB program, Richard Lenski, remembered him as “a wonderful friend and colleague and an enthusiastic leader of EEB and supporter of the program’s graduate students and their research.”
