= Reavis L. Mitchell Jr. =

American historian (1947–2020)

Reavis Lee Mitchell Jr.
- Born: July 12, 1947; Nashville, Tennessee, U.S.
- Died: June 16, 2020 (aged 72); Brentwood, Tennessee, U.S.
- Education: Fisk University (BA); Tennessee State University (MS); Middle Tennessee State University (PhD)
- Occupations: Historian, academic administrator
- Employer: Fisk University

Reavis Lee Mitchell Jr. (July 12, 1947 – June 16, 2020) was an American historian and academic administrator. He was the dean of the School of Humanities and Behavioral Social Sciences and professor of history at Fisk University, a historically black university in Nashville, Tennessee. He was the chairman of the Tennessee Historical Commission from 2015 to 2020.

== Early life and education ==
Mitchell was born on July 12, 1947, in Nashville, Tennessee. He attended St. Vincent de Paul Catholic School and Pearl High School, and he earned a Bachelor of Arts from Fisk University, a Master of Science from Tennessee State University, and a PhD from Middle Tennessee State University.

== Career ==
Mitchell began his career as a member of the history faculty at Fisk University in 1980. He also worked as an adjunct professor at the University of St. Francis and Vanderbilt University. Mitchell held several administrative posts at Fisk, including Director of Institutional Advancement, Executive Assistant to the President, and Dean of Academic Affairs.

Mitchell served on the Tennessee Historical Commission from 2009 until his death, including as its chairman from 2015. He was also the executive vice president of the Tennessee Historical Society.

== Death ==
Mitchell died on June 16, 2020, in Brentwood, Tennessee, at the age of 72. He is buried in Greenwood Cemetery.

Mitchell's life was honored at the 2021 Nashville Conference on African American History and Culture in Nashville. The conference produced a profile on him as part of the 2021 conference proceedings.

== Personal life ==
Mitchell had a wife, Dr. Patricia W. Mitchell, and four sons, Reavis L. Mitchell III, Roland W. Mitchell, Reagan P. Mitchell, and Roman B.W. Mitchell. He resided in Brentwood, Tennessee, and he attended St. Vincent de Paul Church, a Catholic church in North Nashville.

== Works ==
- Mitchell, Reavis L. Jr. (1995). Thy Loyal Children Make Their Way: A History of Fisk University Since 1866. Nashville, Tennessee: Fisk University Press. OCLC 33197286.
