= Lonnie Ingram =

American microbiologist (1947–2020)

Lonnie O'Neal Ingram (1947 – June 25, 2020) was an American microbiologist who focused on microbial biotechnology. He was a distinguished professor at University of Florida and an Elected Fellow of the American Academy of Microbiology and Society of Industrial Microbiology.
