= Oabdius =

Oabdius ("o-ab'-di-us", Codex Alexandrinus: "Oabdios", Codex Vaticanus: "eios", Fritzsche: "Ioabdios", omitted in the King James Version) was one of the sons of Ela, who had separated from their "strange wives" (1 Esdras 9:27) = "Abdi" of Book of Ezra 10:26.
