= Karin Peschel =

German economist (1935–2020)

- Born: 25 October 1935; Eutritzsch, Leipzig, Saxony, Germany
- Died: 19 June 2020 (aged 84); Germany
- Occupation: economist

Karin Peschel (25 October 1935 – 19 June 2020) was a German economist and university teacher at the University of Kiel. From 1992 to 1996, she served as rector of the university, the first woman to occupy this position.

Peschel died on 19 June 2020, aged 84.
