= Tineke Verburg =

Dutch television presenter (1956–2020)

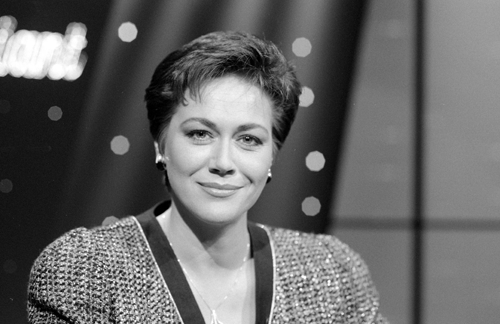
- Verburg in 1991
- Born: 25 February 1956; Utrecht, Netherlands
- Died: 13 June 2020 (aged 64); Amsterdam, Netherlands
- Occupations: Announcer; presenter
- Years active: 1979-2015
- Known for: TROS Aktua
- Notable work: TROS

Christine Maria Verburg (25 February 1956 – 13 June 2020) was a Dutch television presenter and journalist. She is known for the magazine programme TROS Aktua.

Verburg started her career in 1979 as an announcer with TROS and became presenter of TROS Aktua in 1984. Later she also presented the game show TROS Triviant as well as Hollywood Boulevard and Lunch TV. In 2001 Verburg moved to commercial broadcasting company RTL before rejoining TROS in 2010.

She died after a long illness in June 2020.
