= Denis Howe =

English footballer (1928–2020)

Personal information
- Full name: Denis Cecil Howe
- Date of birth: 14 September 1928
- Place of birth: West Ham, England
- Date of death: 7 June 2020 (aged 91)
- Place of death: England
- Position: Defender

Senior career*
Years	Team	Apps	(Gls)
1949–1951	West Ham United	0	(0)
1951–1954	Darlington	89	(1)
1954–1958	Southend United	101	(0)
1958–1959	Aldershot	33	(0)
1959–1960	Bedford Town	35	(0)
- * Club domestic league appearances and goals

Denis Cecil Howe (14 September 1928 – 7 June 2020) was an English footballer who made 223 appearances in the Football League for Darlington, Southend United and Aldershot in the 1950s. A full back or centre half, he also played in the Southern League for Bedford Town.

== Life and career ==
Howe was born in September 1928 in West Ham, now part of London. He began his football career with West Ham United, but never played first-team football for the club, and moved on to Darlington in 1951. After three years and 89 appearances in the Third Division North, he spent four seasons in the Southern Section with Southend United, for whom he played 108 senior matches (101 in league competition). He finished his career in the Football League with a season at Aldershot in Division Four. Howe signed for Southern League club Bedford Town in 1959, and played regularly for his first season with the club, but injuries restricted his second season to just six senior matches, the last of which was on 3 November 1960.

He died in June 2020 at the age of 91.
