= Araripe =

Municipality in Ceará, Brazil

Coordinates: 7.21278°S 40.0458°W

- Municipality
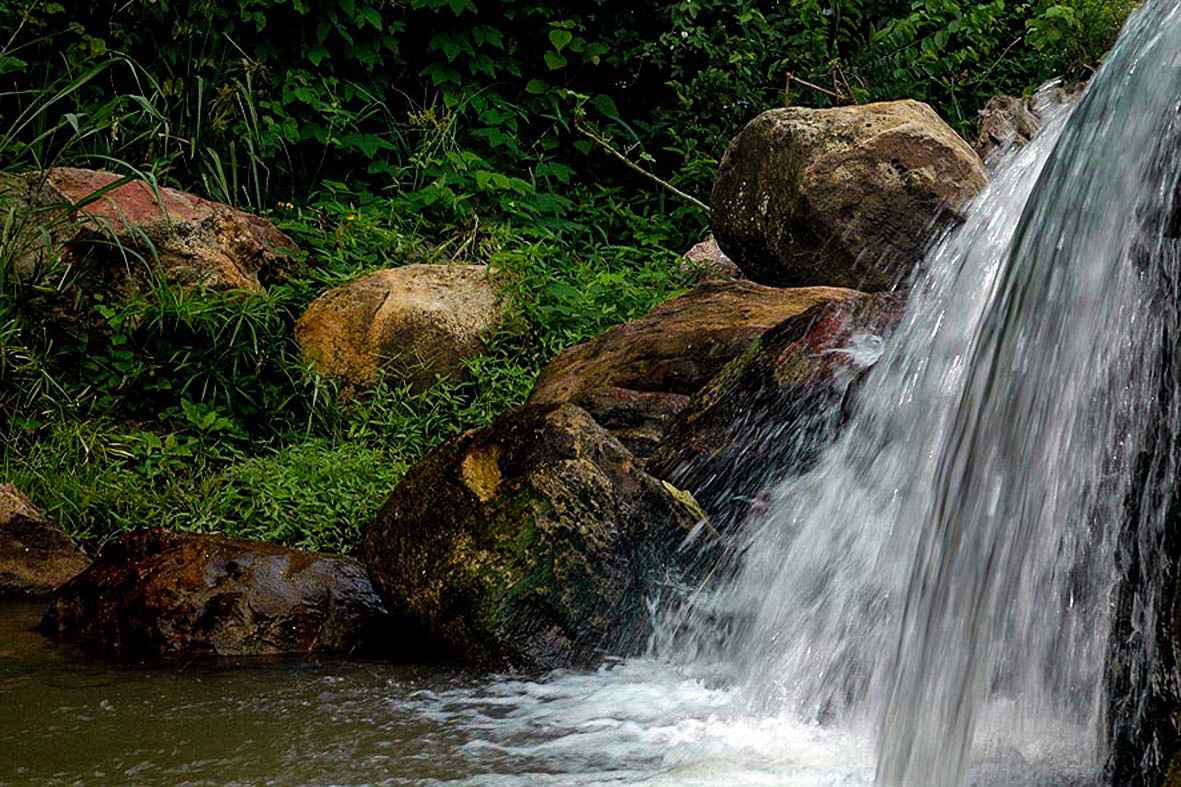

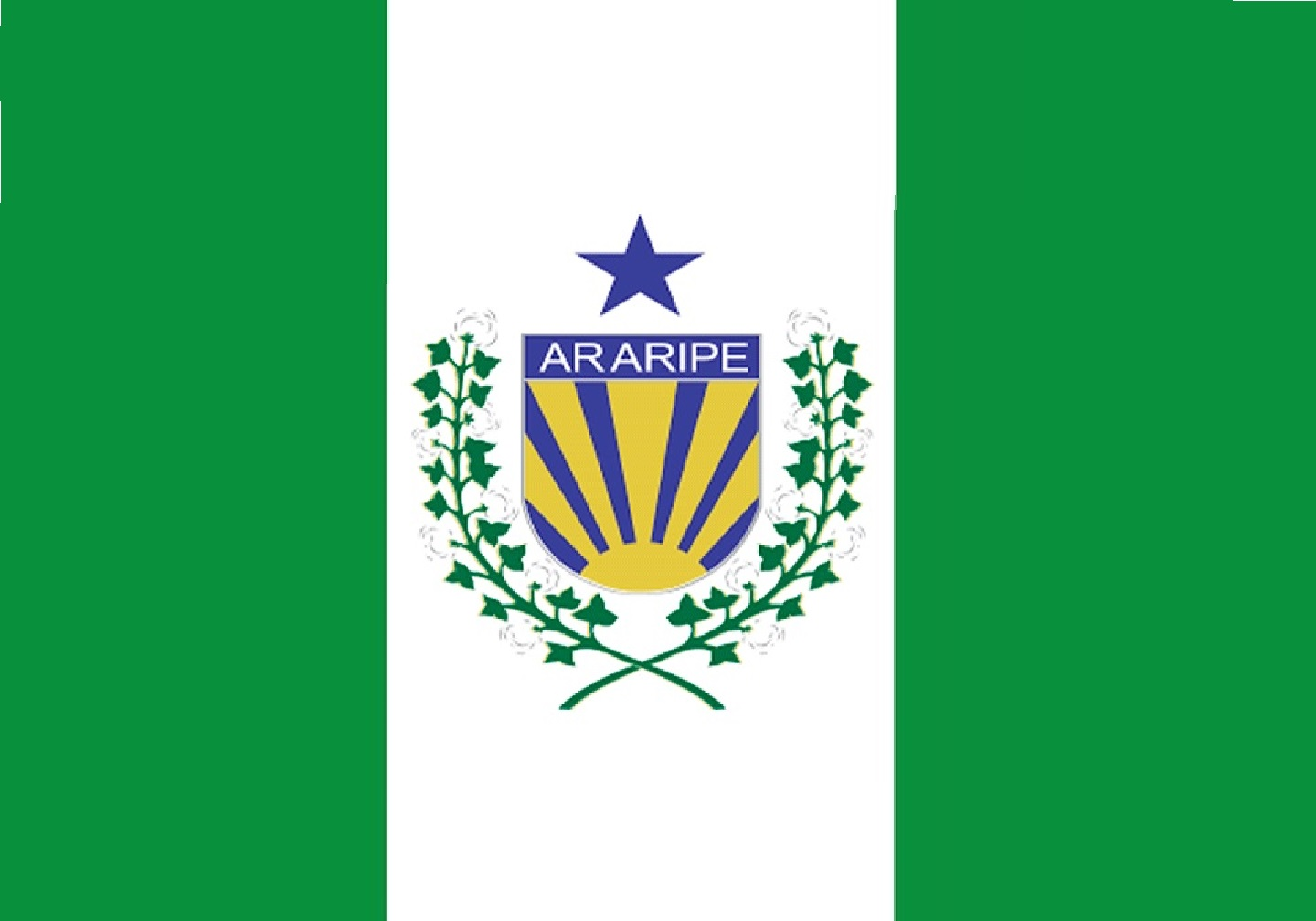
- Flag
- Interactive map of Araripe
- Country: Brazil
- Region: Nordeste
- State: Ceará
- Mesoregion: Sul Cearense

Population (2020)
  - Total: 21,654
- Time zone: UTC−3 (BRT)

Araripe is a municipality in the state of Ceará in the Northeast region of Brazil.

== See also ==
- List of municipalities in Ceará
