= Nilamber Dev Sharma =

Indian scholar and writer (1931–2020)

- Born: October 6, 1931; Jammu, Jammu and Kashmir, British India
- Died: June 23, 2020 (aged 88); New Delhi
- Occupations: Scholar, writer
- Parent: Pt. Madan Mohan Shastri
- Awards: Padma Shri
- Website: Official web site

Nilamber Dev Sharma (October 6, 1931 – June 23 2020) was an Indian scholar and writer of Dogri and English literature, best known for his work, An Introduction to Modern Dogri Literature (1965), the first publication in English about Dogri literature. The Government of India honored Sharma in 2011, with the fourth highest civilian award of Padma Shri.

== Biography ==
Nilamber Dev Sharma was born to a Sanskrit scholar and a renowned astrologer, Madan Mohan Shastri, on 6 October 1931 at Jammu, British India. He graduated in English literature from the Government Gandhi Memorial College, Jammu (GGMC), continued his studies at the Hindu College, New Delhi from where he obtained a master's degree and started his career as an English lecturer in Kairana, Uttar Pradesh. Thereafter, he went to England and secured an honours degree in English from the University of Leeds, UK. After his return from England, Sharma moved to his alma mater, the Government Gandhi Memorial College, in 1953 as English Professor. Few years later, he joined Jammu and Kashmir Academy of Art, Culture and Languages in 1961 as its deputy secretary and rose to the position of the secretary. Nilamber Dev Sharma was the first convenor of the Dogri Advisory Board when Sahitya Academy officially recognized Dogri in 1969. He was also instrumental in the official recognition and inclusion of Dogri in the 22 Scheduled languages of India, officially recognized in December 2003 through the 92nd Constitutional Amendment, which added it to the Eighth Schedule of the Indian Constitution In 1972, Sharma resigned from the Academy and entered politics, a stay which was short lived.

Sharma is a former director of the Amar Mahal Museum and Library and a former president of Dogri Sanstha.He also served in the J&K Consumer Council. He is credited with several publications including An Introduction to Modern Dogri Literature, A Brief Survey of Dogri (Modern) Literature, An Introduction to Dogri Folk, Literature, Drama and Art, Chete Kish Khatte, Kish Mitthe, Rishtey and Kahani di Tapaash He has edited a number of books for Dogri Sanstha, Jammu and has translated Iyaruingam, an Assamese work by the novelist Birendera Kumar Bhattacharyya.

== See also ==
- Jammu and Kashmir Academy of Art, Culture and Languages
- Dogri
