= Harry Smith (British journalist) =

British journalist (1951–2020)

- Born: 7 September 1950; Perth, Scotland
- Died: 19 June 2020 (aged 69)
- Partner: Joy Smith
- Presenting career
- Show: STV News
- Station: STV
- Style: Reporter
- Country: Scotland (while at STV News); United Kingdom
- Previous shows: BBC, ITN (1988–2005)

Harry Smith (7 September 1950 – 19 June 2020) was a Westminster correspondent for STV News. He was also an occasional correspondent and freelancer for Channel 4 News, ITV News and Aljazeera.

== Career ==
Born in Perth, Scotland, Harry Smith started his career in 1969 as editor of the local newspaper Forfar Dispatch, before moving to Bristol to become a reporter for the Western Daily. Smith returned to Scotland in 1979 to work with Radio Forth. He joined the BBC in 1980 as a reporter, before moving to Scottish Television in 1987. A year later, he joined ITN, becoming its Home Affairs correspondent in March 1994, and Scotland's political correspondent in 1997.

Smith left ITN in 2007, but joined STV News shortly afterwards as their Westminster correspondent.

== Death ==
He died on 19 June 2020, aged 69.
