= John Springall =

English cricketer (1932–2020)

Personal information
- Full name: John Denis Springall
- Born: 19 September 1932; Southwark, Surrey, England
- Died: 26 June 2020 (aged 87); Norfolk, England
- Batting: Right-handed
- Bowling: Right-arm medium

Domestic team information
- Years: Team
- 1955–1967: Nottinghamshire

Career statistics
Competition	First-class	List A
Matches	121	1
Runs scored	5176	6
Batting average	25.88	6.00
100s/50s	2/32	0/0
Top score	107*	6
Balls bowled	6352	36
Wickets	80	0
Bowling average	41.40	–
5 wickets in innings	2	–
10 wickets in match	0	–
Best bowling	6/43	–
Catches/stumpings	51/–	0/–
- Source: Cricinfo, 17 November 2020

John Denis Springall (19 September 1932 – 26 June 2020) was an English first-class cricketer. He played in 121 matches for Nottinghamshire between 1955 and 1963, and returned for a single List A cricket match in 1967.

A middle-order batsman, Springall had his most successful season in 1959, when he scored 1488 runs at an average of 35.42 and hit his only first-class centuries: 107 not out against Leicestershire and 100 not out against Northamptonshire. He also had his best return with his medium-pace bowling in 1959, with 6 for 43 against Surrey. From 1964 to 1967, he played for Walsden in the Central Lancashire League.

After his cricket career, Springall lived in Spain for some years, but later he returned to the UK and lived in Norfolk to be near his son. He died in Norfolk in June 2020, aged 87.
