= Krystyna Krupska-Wysocka =

Polish film director (1935–2020)

- Born: 19 September 1935; Stowbtsy
- Died: 9 June 2020 (aged 84); Warsaw, Poland
- Occupation: Film director

Krystyna Krupska-Wysocka (19 September 1935 – 9 June 2020) was a Polish film director. In 2011 she was awarded the Order of Polonia Restituta.

Krupska-Wysocka was active in the Solidarity Trade Union, when she organized help with friends for the opposition and the film community. She was friends with the Rev. Stefan Niedzielak, a Catholic priest and chaplain who co-founded the Federation of Katyn Families, and who was assassinated in 1989 by "unknown perpetrators".

She was a member of the Polish Filmmakers Association. In 2011, Polish President Bronisław Komorowski awarded her the Officer's Cross of the Order of Polonia Restituta. 1988 and 1994, she received awards at the Polish National Festival of Films for Television Shows for Children and Youth.

Krystyna Krupska-Wysocka died in Warsaw on 9 June 2020, aged 84.

== Filmography ==
- 1970: Góry o zmierzchu (second director)
- 1970: Różaniec z granatów (cast)
- 1971: Jak daleko stąd, jak blisko (second director)
- 1971: Wezwanie (second director)
- 1972: Skarb Trzech Łotrów (second director)
- 1973: Stracona noc (second director)
- 1977: Sam na sam (second director)
- 1979: Sekret Enigmy (second director)
- 1979: Tajemnica Enigmy (second director)
- 1985: Żuraw i czapla (director, scriptwriter)
- 1989: Lawa (second director)
- 1991: Przeklęta Ameryka (cast)
- 1993: Skutki noszenia kapelusza w maju (director, scriptwriter)
- 1994: Ptaszka (director)
