= 2020 in Canada =

- Decades: 2000s; 2010s; 2020s
- See also: History of Canada; Timeline of Canadian history; List of years in Canada

Events from the year 2020 in Canada.

== Incumbents ==
=== The Crown ===
- Monarch – Elizabeth II

=== Federal government ===
- Governor General – Julie Payette
- Prime Minister – Justin Trudeau
- Parliament – 43rd

=== Provincial governments ===
==== Lieutenant Governors ====
- Lieutenant Governor of Alberta – Lois Mitchell (until August 26), then Salma Lakhani
- Lieutenant Governor of British Columbia – Janet Austin
- Lieutenant Governor of Manitoba – Janice Filmon
- Lieutenant Governor of New Brunswick – Brenda Murphy
- Lieutenant Governor of Newfoundland and Labrador – Judy Foote
- Lieutenant Governor of Nova Scotia – Arthur LeBlanc
- Lieutenant Governor of Ontario – Elizabeth Dowdeswell
- Lieutenant Governor of Prince Edward Island – Antoinette Perry
- Lieutenant Governor of Quebec – J. Michel Doyon
- Lieutenant Governor of Saskatchewan – Russell Mirasty

==== Premiers ====
- Premier of Alberta – Jason Kenney
- Premier of British Columbia – John Horgan
- Premier of Manitoba – Brian Pallister
- Premier of New Brunswick – Blaine Higgs
- Premier of Newfoundland and Labrador – Dwight Ball (until August 19), then Andrew Furey
- Premier of Nova Scotia – Stephen McNeil
- Premier of Ontario – Doug Ford
- Premier of Prince Edward Island – Dennis King
- Premier of Quebec – François Legault
- Premier of Saskatchewan – Scott Moe

=== Territorial governments ===
==== Commissioners ====
- Commissioner of Northwest Territories – Margaret Thom
- Commissioner of Nunavut – Nellie Kusugak (until June 22), then Rebekah Williams (acting)
- Commissioner of Yukon – Angélique Bernard

==== Premiers ====
- Premier of Northwest Territories – Caroline Cochrane
- Premier of Nunavut – Joe Savikataaq
- Premier of Yukon – Sandy Silver

== Events ==
=== January ===
- January 1 – Quebec raises its minimum cannabis age from 18 to 21, the highest minimum cannabis age in Canada.
- January 5 – Canada defeats Russia 4–3 to win gold at the 2020 World Junior Ice Hockey Championships.
- January 8 – Fifty-seven Canadians, as well as approximately 80 others ultimately travelling to Canada, are killed after Ukraine International Airlines Flight 752 was shot down by Iran shortly after takeoff from Tehran Imam Khomeini Airport.
- January 12 – A nuclear alert is erroneously sent out to all Ontario residents, after the Pickering Nuclear Generating Station experiences anomalies.
- January 17 – January 2020 North American storm complex: St. John's, Newfoundland and Labrador goes into a state of emergency after 76 centimetres of snow fell during a bomb cyclone. The Canadian Armed Forces were called in to help with the cleanup.
- January 20 – Start of national pipeline protests across the country.
- January 25 – The country confirms its first COVID-19 case in Toronto.

=== February ===
- February 8 – The Quebec CAQ government pass Bill 40. The Bill abolish's The French and English school boards and turns them into school service centres.
- February 21 – Ontario teachers held a one-day province wide strike.

=== March ===
- March 6 – Canada's first COVID-19 death is recorded in North Vancouver.
- March 8 – Yukon permanently ends Daylight Saving Time.
- March 21 – Canada closes its border with the United States to non-essential travel due to the COVID-19 pandemic.

=== April ===
- April 18 – 19 – A series of shootings and arson attacks takes place in various Nova Scotia locations, with 23 people killed.
- April 26 – A large flood hits Fort McMurray, forcing 13,000 people to evacuate.

=== May ===
- May 30 – Protests across Canada begin in solidarity with Americans protesting the murder of George Floyd, and against police issues and racism in Canada.

=== August ===
- August 7 – A tornado in southern Manitoba kills two and causes damage near Virden and Scarth.
- August 10 – Wildfire Red Lake 49 ignites near Red Lake, Ontario which advances within 2 km of the west-end of the town, forcing the evacuation of 95 percent of the 4000 residents of the community. Though small by comparison to the Fort McMurray fire of 2016 which was 800 times the size of this fire, it is unusual in the fire's proximity to the community.
- August 17 – The Canadian Football League cancels the 2020 CFL season.
- August 26 – Quebec's Minister of Justice and French Language Simon Jolin-Barrette announced plans for 2021 that he will be strengthening Bill 101, the French language in the province of Quebec.

=== September ===
- September 14 – New Brunswick general election is held, resulting in a Progressive Conservative majority government.
- September 10 – 21 – 2020 Toronto International Film Festival.
- September 20 – Yukon stops the twice yearly changing of clocks, committing to UTC−07:00. This puts solar noon around 14:00, effectively double daylight saving time year-round.
- September 28 – The Tampa Bay Lightning win the Stanley Cup in Edmonton after defeating the Dallas Stars in Game 6 of the 2020 Stanley Cup Finals.

=== October ===
- October 19 – 2020 Polaris Music Prize awarded.
- October 21 – Trudeau minority government survives confidence vote 180 to 146, in the House of Commons.
- October 24 – British Columbia general election is held, resulting in a New Democratic majority government.
- October 26 – Saskatchewan general election is held, resulting in a fourth consecutive Saskatchewan Party majority government.
- October 31 – Two people are killed and five injured in the Quebec City stabbing.

=== November ===
- November 1 – Daylight saving time ends
- November 24/25 – Prince Edward Island and Newfoundland and Labrador will temporarily leave the Atlantic Bubble, due the latest wave in the pandemic.

=== December ===
- December 1 – Yukon officials announce a mask mandate and urges people to stay home amid a rise of cases.
- December 3
  - COVID-19 pandemic in Canada
    - The Quebec government cancels a plan to allow Christmas gatherings of up to 10 people amid a rise of cases.
    - Alberta reports 1,854 new COVID-19 cases, a single-day record.
- December 7 – Prime Minister Trudeau says that the country will receive 240,000 doses of Pfizer and BioNTech’s vaccine candidate by the end of the year.
- December 30 – The 2021 Canadian Honours List is announced.

=== Events cancelled as a result of the COVID-19 pandemic ===
- 15th Canadian Folk Music Awards
- 61st public duties season of the Ceremonial Guard of the Canadian Armed Forces
- Anime North 2020
- All bowling national championships covering both five pin and tenpin.
- Animethon 2020
- Calgary Expo 2020
- Calgary Stampede
- Canada Reads
- 2020 Canadian Football League season
- 2020 Canadian Junior Hockey League playoffs, including the 2020 Memorial Cup
- Canadian National Exhibition and the Canadian International Air Show
- Celebration of Light
- Cirque du Soleil
- Esso Cup
- FIS Cross-Country World Cup Finals in Canmore
- All Golf Canada national championships (most provincial events proceeded under no-touch golf rules).
- Honda Indy Toronto 2020
- 2020 IIHF Women's World Championship (ice hockey) in Halifax and Truro
- Labour Day parades
- Montreal Comiccon 2020
- Northern Lights Festival Boréal
- Otafest 2020
- Pacific National Exhibition 2020
- Pride parades
- Most Santa Claus parades
- Shaw Charity Classic
- Stratford Festival
- 2020 Toronto Caribbean Carnival (Caribana)
- Telus Cup
- Toronto Comicon 2020
- Toronto Waterfront Marathon
- All university sports administered by Atlantic University Sport, Canada West Universities Athletic Association, Ontario University Athletics, and U Sports
- 2020 Royal Winter Fair
- Most school events
- Juno Awards of 2020

== Deaths ==
=== January ===
- January 1
  - János Aczél, mathematician (b. 1924)
  - Peter Neumann, gridiron football player (b. 1931)
- January 2
  - Bill Graham, gridiron football player (b. 1935)
  - Tom Hickey, politician (b. 1933)
- January 3
  - Harvey Reti, boxer (b. 1937)
  - Douglas N. Walton, academic and author (b. 1942)
- January 4
  - Russell Bannock, test pilot and World War II fighter ace (b. 1919)
  - Bonnie Burstow, psychotherapist (b. 1945)
  - John R. Cunningham, medical physicist (b. 1927)
- January 5
  - Peter Dyck, Manitoba politician (b. 1946)
  - Walter Learning, actor and theatre director (b. 1938)
  - John Migneault, ice hockey player (b. 1949)
- January 6 – Reva Gerstein, psychologist and educator (b. 1917)
- January 7 – Neil Peart, drummer and lyricist for Rush (b. 1952)
- January 9 – Leo Kolber, businessman and former Senator (b. 1929)
- January 10
  - John Crosbie, provincial and federal politician (b. 1931)
  - Bud Fowler, gridiron football player (b. 1925 or 1926)
  - Michael Posluns, journalist (b. 1941)
- January 14 – Eville Gorham, scientist (b. 1925)
- January 15 – Rocky Johnson, wrestler (b. 1944)
- January 16 – William J. Samarin, linguist (b. 1926)
- January 17
  - Thérèse Dion, television personality (b. 1927)
  - Rhona Wurtele, skier (b. 1922)
  - Bobby Kay, wrestler (b. 1950)
- January 18
  - John Burke, composer (b. 1951)
  - Steve Gillespie, wrestler (b. 1963)
  - Norm Hill, football player (b. 1928)
  - Roger Nicolet, engineer (b. 1931)
  - Gordon A. Smith, artist (b. 1919)
  - Jim Smith, politician (b. 1935)
- January 18 – John Gibson, ice hockey player (b. 1959)
- January 20 – Kit Hood, television editor (b. 1943)
- January 21 – Norman Amadio, jazz pianist (b. 1928)
- January 23
  - Fernand Daoust, trade unionist (b. 1926)
  - Jean-Noël Tremblay, politician (b. 1926)
- January 25
  - Siegfried Enns, politician (b. 1924)
  - Clifford Wiens, architect (b. 1926)
- January 26 – Louis Nirenberg, mathematician (b. 1925)
- January 29 – Alfred John Ellis, banker (b. 1915)
- January 30
  - Jake MacDonald, writer (b. 1949)
  - Raymond Reierson, politician (b. 1919)

=== February ===
- February 1 – Roger Landry, businessman (b. 1934)
- February 2 – Bernard Ebbers, businessman and convicted fraudster (b. 1941)
- February 3 – John Edward Brockelbank, instrument technician and politician (b. 1931)
- February 4
  - Peter Hogg, legal scholar and lawyer (b. 1939)
  - L. Jacques Ménard, businessman (b. 1946)
  - Frank Plummer, scientist (b. 1952)
- February 5
  - Diane Cailhier, filmmaker and director (b. 1947)
  - Ian Cushenan, ice hockey player (b. 1933)
- February 7
  - Ron Calhoun, executive (b. 1933)
  - Brian Glennie, ice hockey player (b. 1946)
  - Larry Popein, ice hockey player (b. 1930)
- February 8 – Bill Robinson, basketball player (b. 1949)
- February 11
  - Maurice Byblow, politician (b. 1946)
  - Louis-Edmond Hamelin, geographer (b. 1923)
  - Timothy Porteous, administrator (b. 1933)
- February 12
  - Christie Blatchford, newspaper columnist, journalist and broadcaster (b. 1951)
  - Charles Hubbard, politician (b. 1940)
- February 13 – Ralph Mercier, politician (b. 1937)
- February 14 – Masao Takahashi, judoka (b. 1929)
- February 17 – Georges Villeneuve, politician (b. 1922)
- February 19
  - Pete Babando, ice hockey player (b. 1925)
  - Robert H. Lee, businessman (b. 1933)
  - Hubert B. MacNeill, physician and politician (b. 1922)
  - John Robertson, sailor (b. 1929)
- February 21
  - Phil Maloney, ice hockey player and coach (b. 1927)
  - Ouida Ramón-Moliner, anaesthetist (b. 1929)
- February 22 – Mark Zanna, social psychologist (b. 1944)
- February 23 – Norene Gilletz, author and cooking instructor (b. 1940)
- February 25 – Bob Steiner, football player (b. 1946)
- February 26 – David Smith, senator (b. 1941)
- February 26 – Craig Mackay, speed skater (b. 1927)

=== March ===
- March 1 – William MacEachern, politician (b. 1930)
- March 2
  - René Coicou, politician (b. 1935)
  - William Johnson, author (b. 1931)
  - Laird Stirling, politician (b. 1938)
- March 3 – Réginald Bélair, politician (b. 1949)
- March 4
  - Serge Deslières, politician and teacher (b. 1947)
  - Jean Payne, politician (b. 1939)
- March 6
  - Norm Fieldgate, football player (b. 1932)
  - Henri Richard, ice hockey player (b. 1936)
- March 7
  - Earl Pomerantz, screenwriter (b. 1945)
  - Laura Smith, singer-songwriter (b. 1952)
- March 9 – John Havelock Parker, politician (b. 1929)
- March 11 – Ken King, ice hockey player (b. 1952)
- March 13 – Dorothy Maclean, educator and writer (b. 1920)
- March 14 – Galen Head, ice hockey player (b. 1947)
- March 15 – Phil Olsen, athlete (b. 1957)
- March 18 – Wray Downes, jazz pianist (b. 1931)
- March 19 – Herbert Marx, politician (b. 1932)
- March 20 – Claude Bennett, politician (b. 1936)
- March 23
  - JR Shaw, businessman (b. 1934)
  - Giles Walker, film director (b. 1946)
- March 30
  - Joe Clark, businessman (b. 1941)
  - Tim Petros, football player (b. 1961)

=== April ===
- April 4
  - Barry Allen, musician (b. 1945)
  - Marguerite Lescop, writer (b. 1915)
- April 5 – Shirley Douglas, actress and activist (b. 1934)
- April 6
  - John Dossetor, physician (b. 1925)
  - Jean Little, author, primarily of children's fiction (b. 1932)
- April 7
  - Peter Cory, Supreme Court of Canada judge (b. 1925)
  - Ghyslain Tremblay, actor and comedian (b. 1951)
- April 8
  - John Hughes, ice hockey player (b. 1954)
  - Pat Stapleton, ice hockey player (b. 1940)
- April 9
  - Jim Conacher, ice hockey player (b. 1921)
  - Mark Golden, historian (b. 1948)
  - Ho Kam Ming, martial artist (b. 1925)
  - Jean-Pierre St-Louis, cinematographer (b. 1951)
- April 10
  - Marke Raines, politician (b. 1927)
  - Tom Webster, ice hockey player and coach (b. 1948)
- April 11
  - Colby Cave, ice hockey player (b. 1994)
  - Paul Haddad, actor (b. 1963)
- April 12
  - Claude Beauchamp, journalist and political activist (b. 1939)
  - Bill Langille, farmer and politician, (b. 1944)
- April 16 – Kenneth Gilbert, musician (b. 1931)
- April 18 – Allan Gotlieb, public servant and Ambassador (b. 1928)
- April 19
  - Aileen Carroll, politician (b. 1944)
  - Claude Lafortune, television presenter (b. 1936)
- April 20 – Hezakiah Oshutapik, politician (b. 1955 or 1956)

=== May ===
- May 2
  - Morris Belzberg, Canadian-born American businessman and sports team owner (b. 1929)
  - Jim Henderson, politician, Ontario MLA (b. 1940)
- May 3
  - Selma Barkham, maritime historian (b. 1927)
  - Paul Cholakis, football player (b. 1928)
  - Eugene Kostyra, politician, Manitoba MLA (b. 1947)
- May 4
  - Michael Lucas, Czechoslovak-born Canadian political activist (b. 1926)
  - Lorne Munroe, Canadian-born American cellist (b. 1924)
- May 5 – George Henderson, politician, member of the House of Commons (b. 1935)
- May 6 – Nahum Rabinovitch, Canadian-born Israeli Orthodox rabbi and posek, head of Yeshivat Birkat Moshe (b. 1928)
- May 7
  - Joyce Davidson, television presenter (b. 1931)
  - Sylvia Ostry, economist (b. 1927)
- May 8 – Nancy Morin, goalball player (b. 1975)
- May 10 – Martin Pasko, Canadian-born American comic book writer and screenwriter (b. 1954)
- May 11
  - Doug McKay, ice hockey player (b. 1929)
  - Jean Nichol, singer (b. 1944)
- May 12 – Renée Claude, actress and singer (b. 1939)
- May 13
  - Gérard Dionne, Roman Catholic prelate and former Bishop of Edmundston (b. 1919)
  - Daren Zenner, Canadian-American boxer (b. 1971)
- May 15
  - Denny DeMarchi, multi-instrumentalist (b. 1962)
  - John Palmer, theatre and film director (b. 1943)
- May 16
  - Cliff Eyland, painter and writer (b. 1954)
  - Monique Mercure, actress (b. 1930)
- May 18
  - Rae Johnson, painter (b. 1953)
  - Michelle Rossignol, actress (b. 1940)
  - Craig Welch, animator
- May 19
  - Ravi Zacharias, Indian-born Canadian-American Christian apologist (b. 1946)
- May 20 – Wilbur MacDonald, politician and former MP (b. 1933)
- May 21
  - Merlin Nunn, judge and former chief justice of the Nova Scotia Supreme Court (b. 1930)
  - Douglas Tyndall Wright, engineer and academic administrator, former President of the University of Waterloo (b. 1927)
- May 22
  - André Cartier, actor (b. 1945)
  - Denise Cronenberg, costume designer (b. 1938)
- May 25
  - Francis Dufour, politician and former Quebec MNA (b. 1929)
  - Louise Feltham, politician (b. 1935)
  - Marv Luster, American Hall of Fame CFL football player (b. 1937)
- May 26
  - Floyd Hillman, ice hockey player (b. 1933)
  - Cliff Pennington, ice hockey player (b. 1940)
  - Houdini, rapper (b. 1998)
- May 27
  - Wally Gacek, ice hockey player (b. 1926)
  - Regis Korchinski-Paquet (b. 1990)
  - Arthur L. Thurlow, politician and judge, former Nova Scotia MLA (b. 1913)
- May 28 – Reed Scowen, politician (b. 1931)
- May 30
  - Michel Gauthier, politician, former Leader of the Opposition, MP, and Quebec MNA (b. 1950)
  - Edward O. Phillips, writer (b. 1931)

=== June ===
- June 1
  - Silver Donald Cameron, journalist and author (b. 1937)
  - Garth Dawley, journalist (b. 1933)
- June 2
  - Yvon Lamarre, politician (b. 1935)
  - Muriel Kent Roy, demographer (b. 1921)
- June 3 – Gary Potts, Temagami First Nation chief (b. 1940s)
- June 4 – Walt Elliot, politician (b. 1933)
- June 5 – Andrée Champagne, actress (b. 1939)
- June 6 – Jean-Marc Chaput, author and public speaker (b. 1930)
- June 7 – Hubert Gagnon, actor and voice dubber (b. 1946)
- June 10
  - Joan Ferner, women's rights advocate (b. 1933)
  - Paul Owen, cricketer (b. 1969)
  - Stuart Lyon Smith, politician (b. 1938)
  - Eppie Wietzes, Dutch-born racing driver (b. 1938)
- June 11
  - Roy Little Chief, First Nations rights activist, politician, and Chief of the Siksika Nation (b. 1938)
  - Cy Strulovitch, Olympic basketball player (b. 1925)
- June 12 – Werner Volkmer, documentary filmmaker (b. 1944)
- June 15
  - Winston Backus, politician (b. 1920)
  - Phil Takahashi, Olympic judoka (b. 1957)
- June 17
  - Victor Feldbrill, conductor and violinist (b. 1924)
  - Hugh Fraser, musician (b. 1958)
- June 19
  - Thomas Brzustowski, engineer and academic (b. 1937)
  - Ralph Haas, engineer and academic (b. 1933)
  - Regan Russell, animal rights activist (b. 1955)
- June 21 – Anthony J. Naldrett, geologist (b. 1933)
- June 24 – David MacLennan, biochemist (b. 1937)
- June 26
  - Ed Conroy, politician (b. 1946)
  - Madeleine Juneau, museologist (b. 1945)
  - Don Seymour, jockey (b. 1961)
- June 27 – Bob Warner, ice hockey player (b. 1950)
- June 28 – Bill McFarlane, gridiron football player (b. 1930)
- June 29
  - James Douglas Henderson, politician (b. 1927)
  - Gene Lakusiak, gridiron football player (b. 1942)
- June 30 – John Metras, gridiron football player (b. 1940)

=== July ===
- July 3
  - Neil Erland Byers, politician (b. 1928)
  - Len Cunning, ice hockey player (b. 1950)
- July 5
  - Bill Barlow, politician (b. 1931)
  - Nick Cordero, actor (b. 1978)
  - Aubert Pallascio, actor (b. 1937)
- July 6 – Deborah Zamble, chemist (b. 1971)
- July 7
  - George Boyd, playwright and news anchor (b. 1952)
  - Yves Lever, film historian and academic (b. 1936)
- July 9 – Bob Sabourin, ice hockey player (b. 1933)
- July 10
  - Robert Curtis Clark, politician (b. 1937)
  - Genevieve Westcott, journalist and television presenter (b. 1965)
- July 11 – Rich Priske, bassist (b. 1967)
- July 12 – Ignat Kaneff, construction executive and philanthropist (b. 1926)
- July 13 – Daniel David Moses, poet and playwright (b. 1952)
- July 16
  - Ken Chinn, punk rock vocalist (b. 1962)
  - Roger Côté, ice hockey player (b. 1939)
  - Ted Gerela, gridiron football player (b. 1944)
  - Marie-Christine Lévesque, author (b. 1958)
- July 17 – J. I. Packer, evangelical theologian (b. 1926)
- July 18
  - Ray Hannigan, ice hockey player (b. 1927)
  - Hubert Kitchen, politician (b. 1928)
- July 19
  - David Cliche, politician (b. 1952)
  - Louis Dicaire, Roman Catholic prelate (b. 1946)
  - Jack McIlhargey, ice hockey player and coach (b. 1952)
- July 20
  - Doug Rogers, judoka (b. 1941)
  - Harry Smith ice hockey player (b. 1935)
- July 24 – Claude Beausoleil, writer and poet (b. 1948)
- July 25
  - Eddie Shack, ice hockey player (b. 1937)
  - Richard L. Weldon, politician (b. 1932)
- July 26
  - Jim Abbott, politician (b. 1942)
  - Brian Chewter, Olympic cyclist (b. 1954)
  - Robert Smith, actor (b. 1966)
- July 27
  - Bernard Cleary, politician (b. 1937)
  - Doug Taylor, historian, professor, author, and connoisseur of movie theatres (b. 1938)
- July 28 – John Loxley, economist (b. 1942)
- July 29 – David Ramsay, politician (b. 1948)

=== August ===
- August 1 – Douglas Wiseman, politician (b. 1930)
- August 3
  - Ralph Klassen, ice hockey player (b. 1955)
  - Sean Martin, cartoonist (b. 1950)
- August 4 – Brent Carver, actor (b. 1951)
- August 7
  - Tim Irwin, sailor (b. 1940)
  - Mike Yaschuk, ice hockey player (b. 1922)
- August 8
  - Salome Bey, blues singer (b. 1933)
  - Adam Comrie, ice hockey player (b. 1990)
- August 9 – Robert Fischer, politician (b. 1937)
- August 11 – Marcel Adams, real estate investor (b. 1920)
- August 13
  - Michel Dumont, actor (b. 1941)
  - Irene Piotrowski, track and field athlete (b. 1941)
  - Lorraine Thomson, dancer and television host (b. 1931)
- August 14 – Joe Norton, politician (b. 1949)
- August 15
  - Richard Gwyn, writer (b. 1934)
  - Francis O'Brien, politician (b. 1927)
  - Lefty Reid, museum curator (b. 1927)
- August 16 – Cathy Smith (b. 1947)
- August 18
  - Joseph Gosnell, Nisga'a indigenous leader (b. 1936)
  - Dale Hawerchuk, ice hockey player (b. 1963)
  - Rick Pugliese, water polo player (b. 1952)
- August 19
  - Cora Etter, politician (b. 1924)
  - Allan Fotheringham, journalist (b. 1932)
- August 21 – Chris Kooy, association football player (b. 1982)
- August 22 – Jean-Marie Brochu, Roman Catholic priest and founder of Le Noël du Bonheur (b. 1926)
- August 23
  - Peter Borwein, mathematician (b. 1953)
  - Bill Burega, ice hockey player (b. 1932)
- August 24
  - Nancy Guptill, politician (b. 1941)
  - P. B. Waite, historian (b. 1922)
- August 25 – Tommy Joe Coffey, gridiron football player (b. 1936)
- August 26 – Gaston Roberge, priest and film historian (b. 1935)
- August 30
  - Ralph Ferguson, politician (b. 1929)
  - Jacques Galipeau, actor (b. 1923)
- August 31 – Norm Spencer, voice actor (b. 1958)

=== September ===
- September 1
  - Moose Lallo, ice hockey player (b. 1924)
  - James A. Taylor, politician (b. 1928)
- September 2 – Stephen M. Drance, ophthalmologist (b. 1925)
- September 4
  - Vince Agro, politician and novelist (b. 1936 or 1937)
  - Bryan Anderson, politician (b. 1942)
  - Lucille Starr, singer (b. 1938)
- September 10 – Terry Buckle, Canadian Anglican prelate, Archbishop of Yukon (b. 1940)
- September 12 – Aline Chrétien, spouse of former prime minister (b. 1936)
- September 17 – Harvey Hodder, politician (b. 1943)
- September 19
  - Al Langlois, ice hockey player (b. 1934)
  - John Turner, politician and 17th Prime Minister of Canada (b. 1929)
- September 20 – Marian Packham, biochemist (b. 1927)
- September 21 – Bob Nevin, ice hockey player (b. 1938)
- September 23
  - John Gray, journalist and author (b. 1937)
  - Brenda Robertson, politician (b. 1929)
- September 25 – George Sayliss, ice hockey player (b. 1931)
- September 26 – Suzanne Tremblay, politician (b. 1937)
- September 28 – Joyce Echaquan, Atikamekw woman (b. 1983 or 1982)

=== October ===
- October 1
  - Gord Brooks, ice hockey player (b. 1950)
  - Glen Despins, curler (b. 1964)
- October 2 – Alan Abraham, politician and Lieutenant Governor of Nova Scotia (b. 1931)
- October 4 – Louis Fortier, biologist and oceanographer (b. 1953)
- October 8
  - Helmut Giesbrecht, politician (b. 1943)
  - Geoff Peddle, Canadian Anglican prelate and Bishop of Eastern Newfoundland and Labrador (b. 1963)
- October 10 – Stanley Schumacher, politician (b. 1933)
- October 12 – Ezra Schabas, musician and educator (b. 1924)
- October 13
  - Dean Bandiera, gridiron football player (b. 1926)
  - Percy Schmeiser, farmer and politician (b. 1931)
- October 14 – William Keir Carr, military officer and Commander of the Royal Canadian Air Force (b. 1923)
- October 19 – Louise Renaud, painter and dancer (b. 1922)
- October 20 – James Randi, magician and skeptic (b. 1928)
- October 23 – R. M. Vaughan, writer (b. 1965)
- October 26
  - David Braley, politician (b. 1941)
  - Peter Cardew, architect (b. 1939)
  - Jacques Godin, actor (b. 1930)
  - Joey Moss, dressing room attendant (b. 1963)
- October 27 – Don Mazankowski, politician and the 4th Deputy Prime Minister of Canada (b. 1935)
- October 28 – Robert Wells, politician (b. 1933)
- October 28 – Margaret Birch, politician (b. 1921)
- October 31 – Michel Auger, journalist (b. 1944)

=== November ===
- November 2 – Max Ward, aviator (b. 1921)
- November 3
  - Anne Covell, sprinter (b. 1950)
  - Georges Massicotte, politician (b. 1930)
- November 5 – Robert Peterson, politician (b. 1937)
- November 6
  - Ray Daviault, baseball player (b. 1934)
  - Jim Neilson, ice hockey player (b. 1940)
- November 8
  - Howie Meeker, ice hockey player and sports announcer (b. 1923)
  - Alex Trebek, host of Jeopardy! (b. 1940)
- November 9 – Lê Dinh, songwriter (b.1934)
- November 11
  - Michel Mongeau, actor (b. 1946)
  - Reg Morelli, ice hockey player (b. 1935)
  - Faye Urban, tennis player (b. 1945)
- November 11 – Pierre Mercier, politician (b. 1937)
- November 13 – Max Gros-Louis, politician and businessman (b. 1931)
- November 16
  - Rick Fraser, ice hockey player (b. 1954)
  - David Hemblen, actor (b. 1941)
  - Bill Morgan, producer (b. 1940)
- November 18
  - Claire Boudreau, genealogist and historian (b. 1965)
  - Kirby Morrow, actor (b. 1973)
- November 20
  - Patricia Beatty, choreographer and dancer (b. 1936)
  - Ken Schinkel, ice hockey player and coach (b. 1932)
- November 23 – Christian Mistral, novelist, poet, and songwriter (b. 1964)
- November 24 – Fred Sasakamoose, ice hockey player (b. 1933)
- November 25 – Marc-André Bédard, politician (b. 1935)
- November 27 – Lou Nistico, ice hockey player (b. 1953)

=== December ===
- December 1 – Sol Tolchinsky, basketball player (b. 1929)
- December 2
  - Jean René Allard, politician (b. 1930)
  - Pat Patterson, wrestler (b. 1941)
- December 3
  - Bill Fitsell, sports journalist and historian (b. 1923)
  - André Gagnon, composer and conductor (b. 1936)
  - William King, politician (b. 1930)
- December 4
  - Goldie Hershon, activist (b. 1941)
  - Larry Mavety, ice hockey player (b. 1942)
- December 5 – Ron Irwin, politician and diplomat (b. 1936)
- December 6 – Neil Armstrong, ice hockey referee (b. 1932)
- December 7
  - Joseph Arvay, lawyer (b. 1949)
  - Sheila A. Hellstrom, military officer (b. 1935)
- December 10 – Cal Hockley, ice hockey player (b. 1931)
- December 12
  - Ronald James Baker, academic administrator (b. 1924)
  - Claude Castonguay, politician and educator (b. 1929)
  - Alfonso Gagliano, politician (b. 1942)
- December 13
  - Pierre Lacroix, ice hockey player (b. 1948)
  - Barry Sonshine, Olympic equestrian (b. 1948)
- December 12 – Alpha Boucher, actor (b. 1943)
- December 15
  - Awesome Again, racehorse (b. 1994)
  - Jim Gorst, politician (b. 1922)
- December 16 – John Martin Crawford, serial killer (b. 1962)
- December 17
  - Lorraine Monk, photographer (b. 1922)
  - Bill Sveinson, politician and poker player (b. 1946)
- December 18
  - Charlie Brooker, ice hockey player (b. 1932)
  - Joan Dougherty, politician (b. 1927)
- December 19 – Leo Panitch, political scientist (b. 1945)
- December 23 – Joel Yanofsky, writer (b. 1955)
- December 26 – Derek Aucoin, baseball player (b. 1970)
- December 27 – Ed Finn, politician and trade unionist, (b. 1926)
- December 28 – Wilma Pelly, actress (b. 1937)
- December 29 – Elaine McCoy, politician (b. 1946)

== See also ==
=== Country overviews ===
- History of Canada
- History of modern Canada
- Outline of Canada
- Government of Canada
- Politics of Canada
- Years in Canada
- Timeline of Canadian history
- 2020 in Canadian television
- List of Canadian films of 2020
