= Alfred Ellis =

Alfred Ellis may refer to:

- Alfred "Pee Wee" Ellis (1941–2021), American saxophonist, composer and arranger
- Alfred Burdon Ellis (1852–1894), British Army officer and ethnographer
- Alfred Ellis (photographer) (1854–1930), English photographer
- Alfred John Ellis (1915–2020), Canadian banker
- Alfred Claude Ellis (1919–1997), schoolteacher and politician
- Ben Ellis (baseball) (Alfred Benjamin Ellis, 1870–1931), infielder in Major League Baseball
