= Hockey Hall of Fame =

Ice hockey museum in Toronto, Ontario

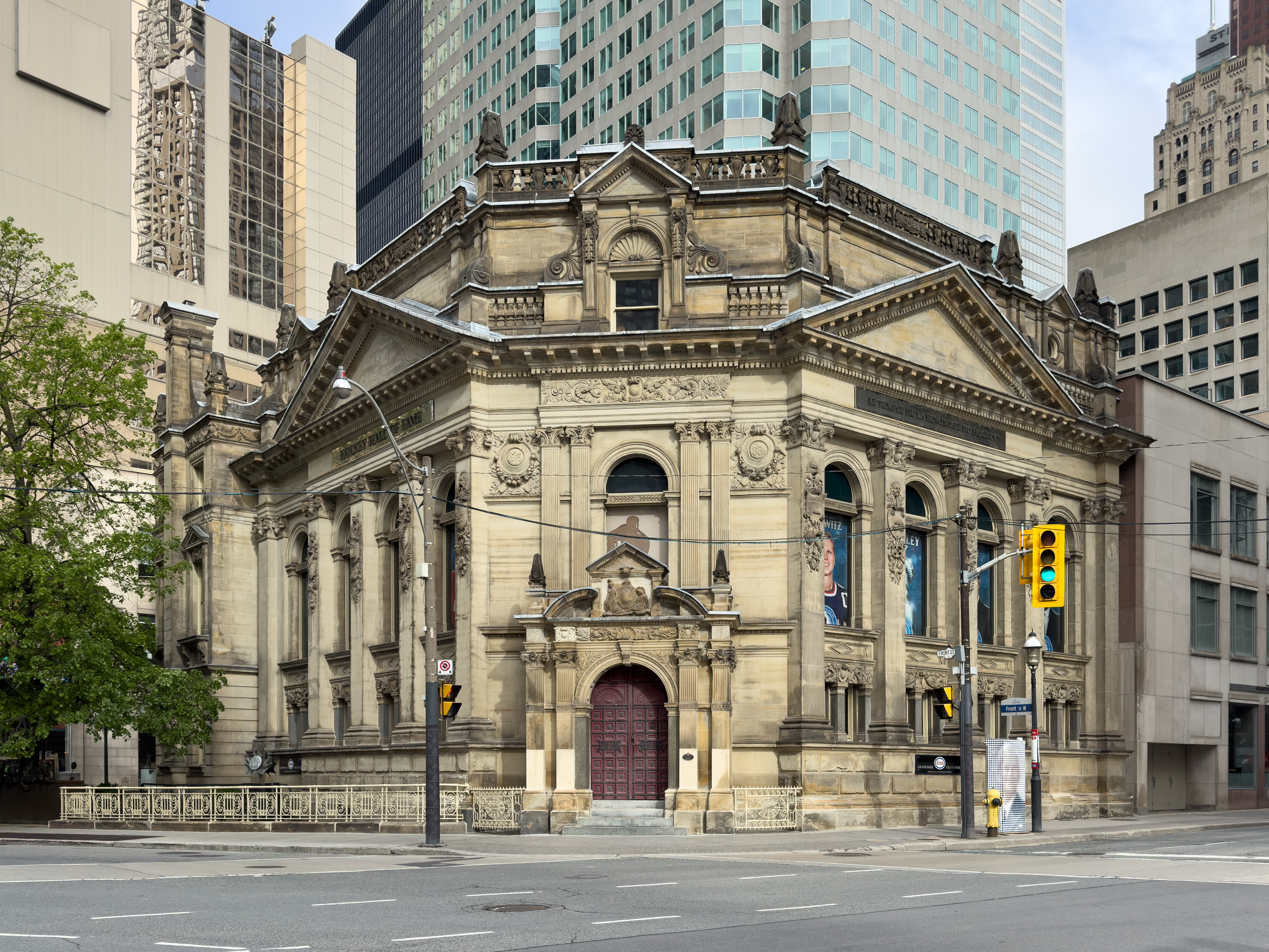
- The Hockey Hall of Fame building in Toronto, from Front and Yonge Street
- Established: 1943
- Location: 30 Yonge Street; Toronto, Ontario; M5E 1X8
- Coordinates: 43°38′49″N 79°22′38″W
- Type: Ice hockey hall of fame and museum
- Visitors: 292,000 (Note: The following figure is the average annual attendance from 1994 to 2019.)
- Founder: James T. Sutherland
- President: Jamie Dinsmore
- Chairperson: Mike Gartner
- Curator: Philip Pritchard
- Public transit access: Union; King
- Website: hhof.com
- Inductees: 310 players 119 builders 16 on-ice officials 430 total

The Hockey Hall of Fame (French: Temple de la renommée du hockey) is a museum and hall of fame located in Toronto, Ontario, Canada. Dedicated to the history of ice hockey, it holds exhibits about players, teams, National Hockey League (NHL) records, memorabilia and NHL trophies, including the Stanley Cup. Founded in Kingston, Ontario, the Hockey Hall of Fame was established in 1943 under the leadership of James T. Sutherland. The first class of honoured members was inducted in 1945, before the Hall of Fame had a permanent location. It moved to Toronto in 1958 after the NHL withdrew its support for the International Hockey Hall of Fame in Kingston, Ontario, due to funding issues. Its first permanent building opened at Exhibition Place in 1961. The hall was relocated in 1993, and is now in downtown Toronto, inside Brookfield Place, and a historic Bank of Montreal building. The Hockey Hall of Fame has hosted International Ice Hockey Federation (IIHF) exhibits and the IIHF Hall of Fame since 1998.

An 18-person committee of players, coaches and others meets annually in June to select new honourees, who are inducted as players, builders or on-ice officials. In 2010, a subcategory was established for female players. The builders' category includes coaches, general managers, commentators, team owners and others who have helped build the game. Honoured members are inducted into the Hall of Fame in an annual ceremony held at the Hall of Fame building in November, which is followed by a special "Hockey Hall of Fame Game" between the Toronto Maple Leafs and a visiting team. As of May 2024, 310 players (including ten women), 119 builders and 16 on-ice officials have been inducted into the Hall of Fame. The Hall of Fame has been criticized for focusing mainly on players from the National Hockey League and largely ignoring players from other North American and international leagues.

== History ==
The Hockey Hall of Fame was established through the efforts of James T. Sutherland, a former president of the Canadian Amateur Hockey Association (CAHA). Sutherland sought to establish it in Kingston, Ontario, as he believed that the city was the birthplace of hockey. In 1943, the NHL and CAHA reached an agreement that a Hall of Fame would be established in Kingston. Originally called the "International Hockey Hall of Fame", its mandate was to honour great hockey players and to raise funds for a permanent location. The first nine "honoured members" (players Hobey Baker, Charlie Gardiner, Eddie Gerard, Frank McGee, Howie Morenz, Tommy Phillips, Harvey Pulford, Hod Stuart and Georges Vezina) were inducted on April 30, 1945, although the Hall of Fame still did not have a permanent home. The first board of governors included hockey executives Red Dutton, Art Ross, Frank Sargent, and Lester Patrick; and journalists Abbie Coo, Wes McKnight, Basil O'Meara, J. P. Fitzgerald, and W. A. Hewitt.

Kingston lost its most influential advocate as permanent site of the Hockey Hall of Fame when Sutherland died in 1955. By 1958, the Hockey Hall of Fame had still not raised sufficient funds to construct a permanent building in Kingston. Clarence Campbell, then President of the NHL, grew tired of waiting for the construction to begin and withdrew the NHL's support to situate the hall in Kingston. In January 1958, the NHL and the Canadian National Exhibition (CNE) reached an agreement to establish a new Hall of Fame building in Toronto, and Frank J. Selke was named managing director of the project.

The temporary Hockey Hall of Fame opened as an exhibit within Canada's Sports Hall of Fame at Exhibition Place in August 1958, and 350,000 people visited it during the 1958 CNE fair. Due to the success of the exhibit, NHL and CNE decided that a permanent home in the Exhibition Place was needed. The NHL agreed to fully fund the building of the new facility on the grounds of Exhibition Place, and construction began in 1960.

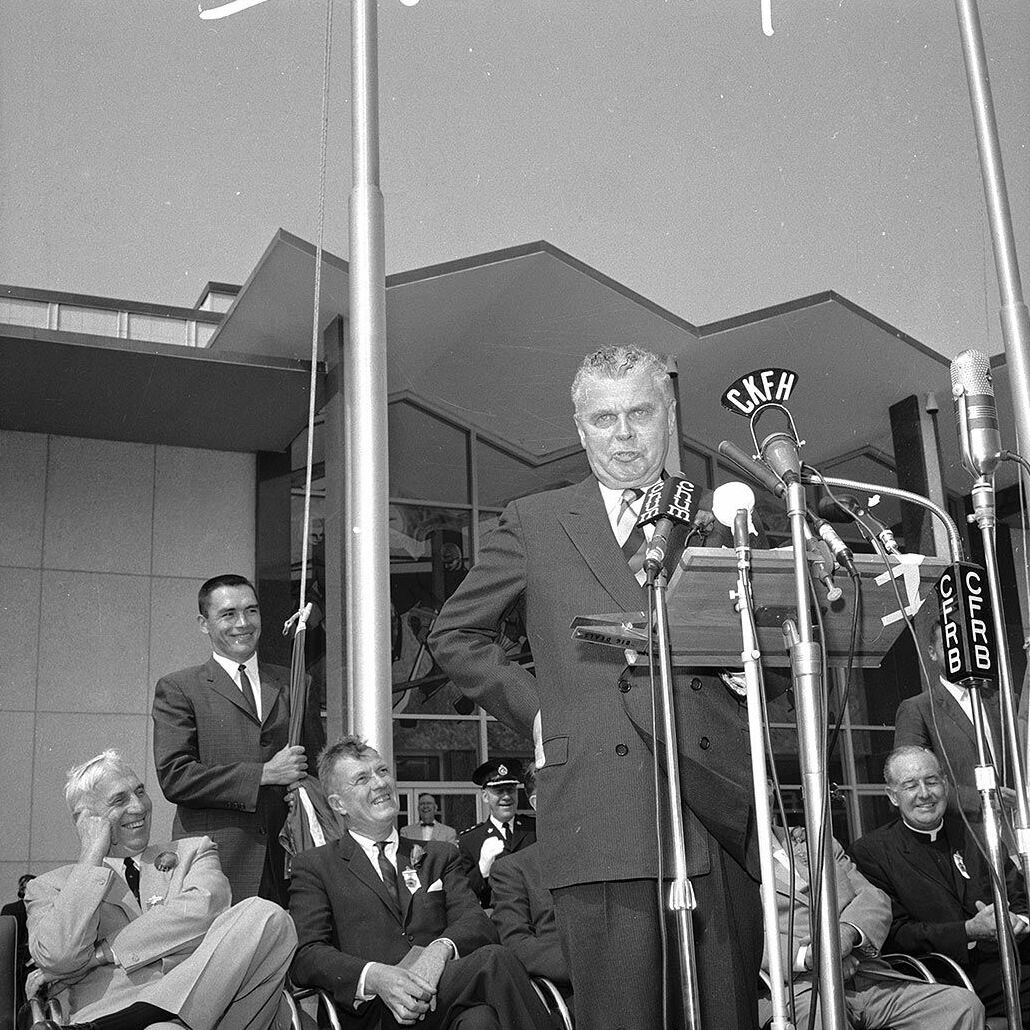
Canadian Prime Minister John Diefenbaker at the hall of fame building's opening at Exhibition Place, Toronto, August 1961. The hall of fame was located at Exhibition Place from 1961–92.

The first permanent Hockey Hall of Fame, which shared a building with the Canadian Sports Hall of Fame, was opened on August 26, 1961, by Canadian Prime Minister John Diefenbaker. Over 750,000 people visited the Hall in its inaugural year. Admission to the Hockey Hall of Fame was free until 1980, when the Hockey Hall of Fame facilities underwent expansion.

By 1986, the Hall of Fame was running out of room in its existing facilities and the board of directors decided that a new home was needed. The Hall vacated the Exhibition Place building in 1992, and its half was taken over by the Canadian Sports Hall of Fame. The building was eventually demolished; portion of its façade was preserved as an entrance to BMO Field stadium. Development of the new location in the BCE Place complex (now Brookfield Place, featuring the former Bank of Montreal at the corner of Yonge and Front Streets in Toronto, began soon after. The design was by Frank Darling and S. George Curry. The new Hockey Hall of Fame officially opened on June 18, 1993. The new location has 4,700 m^{2} (50,600 sq ft) of exhibition space, seven times larger than that of the old facility. The Hockey Hall of Fame averaged an annual attendance of 292,000 between 1994 and 2019.

== Operations and organization ==
The first curator of the new Hall of Fame was Bobby Hewitson. Following Hewitson's retirement in 1967, Lefty Reid was appointed to the position. Reid was curator of the Hockey Hall of Fame for the next 25 years, retiring in 1992. Following Reid's retirement, former NHL referee-in-chief Scotty Morrison, who was the president of the Hockey Hall of Fame since 1986, was appointed curator. Morrison supervised the relocation of the Hall of Fame and its exhibits. The current curator is Phil Pritchard.

The Hockey Hall of Fame is led by Lanny McDonald, Chairman of the Board, and Chief Executive Officer, Jeff Denomme. McDonald was succeeded by Mike Gartner in June 2025. The Hall of Fame is operated as a non-profit business called the "Hockey Hall of Fame and Museum" (HHFM), independent of the National Hockey League. It was originally sponsored by the NHL and Hockey Canada and revenue is generated mainly through admissions.

== Exhibits ==
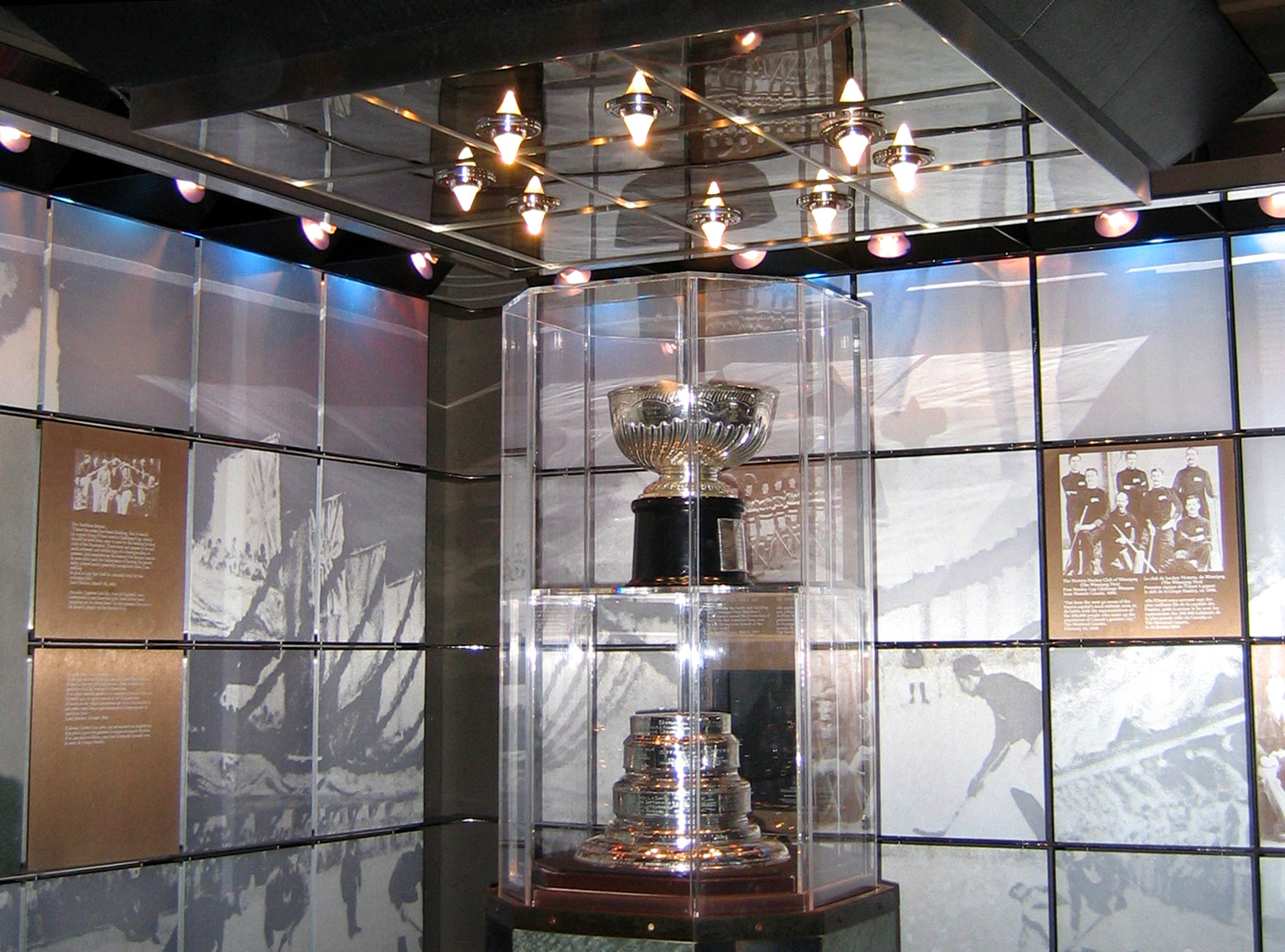
The original Stanley Cup in the bank vault of the Hall of Fame

The Hockey Hall of Fame has 15 exhibit areas covering 60,000 square feet (5,600 m^{2}). Visitors can view trophies, memorabilia and equipment worn by players during special games. The Esso Great Hall, described as "a Cathedral to the icons of Hockey", contains portraits and biographical information about every Hall of Fame honoured member. The centrepiece of the Great Hall is the Stanley Cup; for part of the year a replica is put on display when the presentation cup travels outside of the Hall of Fame. The original version of the Cup and the older rings, as well as all of the current National Hockey League trophies, are displayed in the bank vault, an alcove off the Great Hall. The Hall of Fame induction ceremony was held in the Great Hall until it outgrew the space and moved to the Allan Lambert Galleria in Brookfield Place.

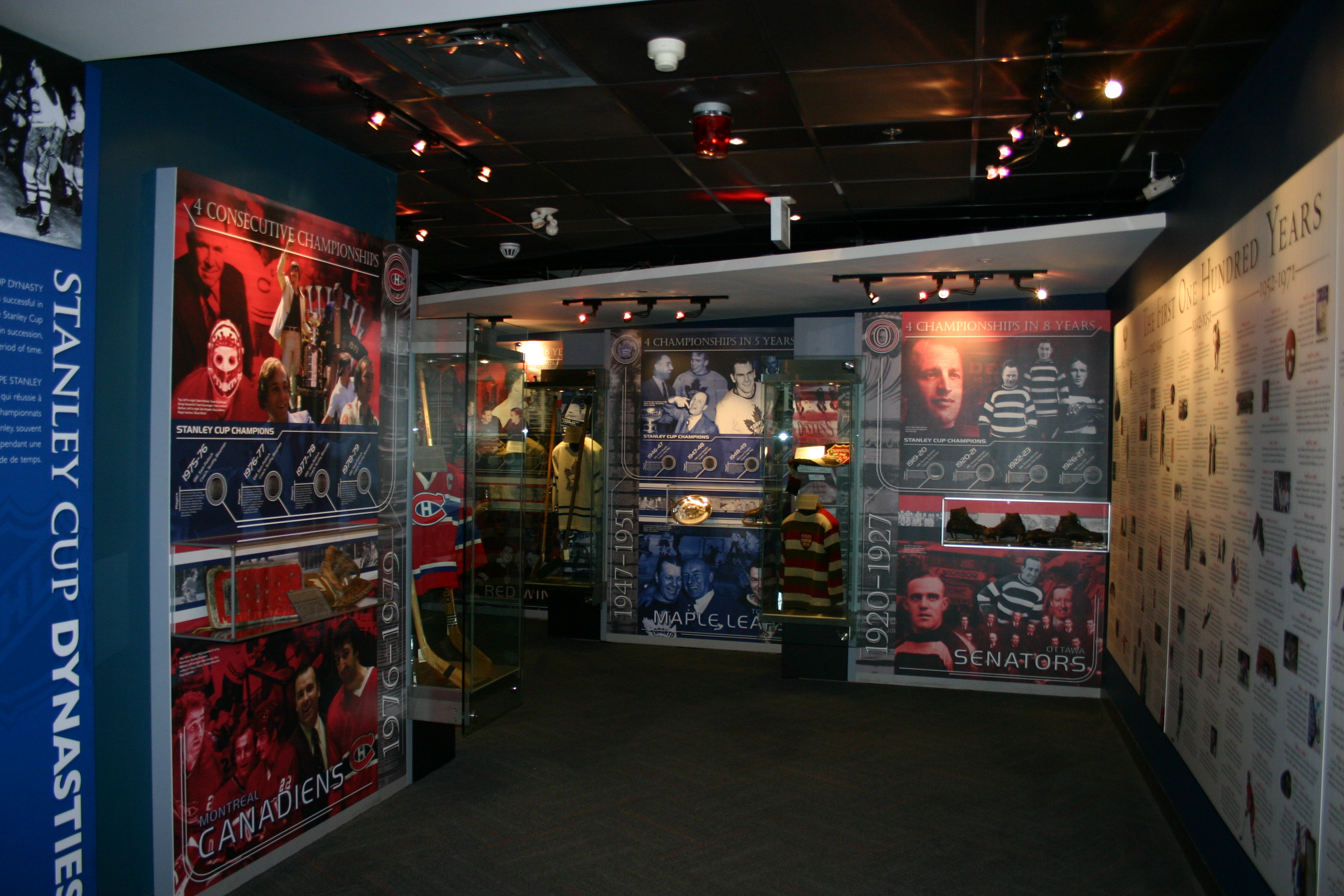
Exhibits and displays for the nine NHL dynasties recognized by the hall of fame

The NHL Zone is a large area featuring displays relating to the NHL. Current teams and players are highlighted in the NHL Today area, while the NHL Retro displays include memorabilia and information about every NHL team past and present. The NHL Legends area features rotating exhibits focusing on honoured members; and NHL Milestones displays exhibits of noteworthy records including Darryl Sittler's ten-point game and Wayne Gretzky's all-time points record. The Stanley Cup dynasties exhibit features displays that include memorabilia from the rosters of nine teams considered to be dynasties because they dominated the NHL for several years at a time. This area also has a replica of the Montreal Canadiens' dressing room as it existed at the old Montreal Forum. The St. Louis Bar and Grill Arena Zone is dedicated to hockey across all levels of play in North America; it includes exhibits about various leagues and sections on women's and disabled hockey leagues. Newly renovated, the exhibit now contains several big ticket items including trophies from multiple North American leagues, artifacts from all Original Six arenas, and a full size Zamboni machine once used at the Boston Garden.

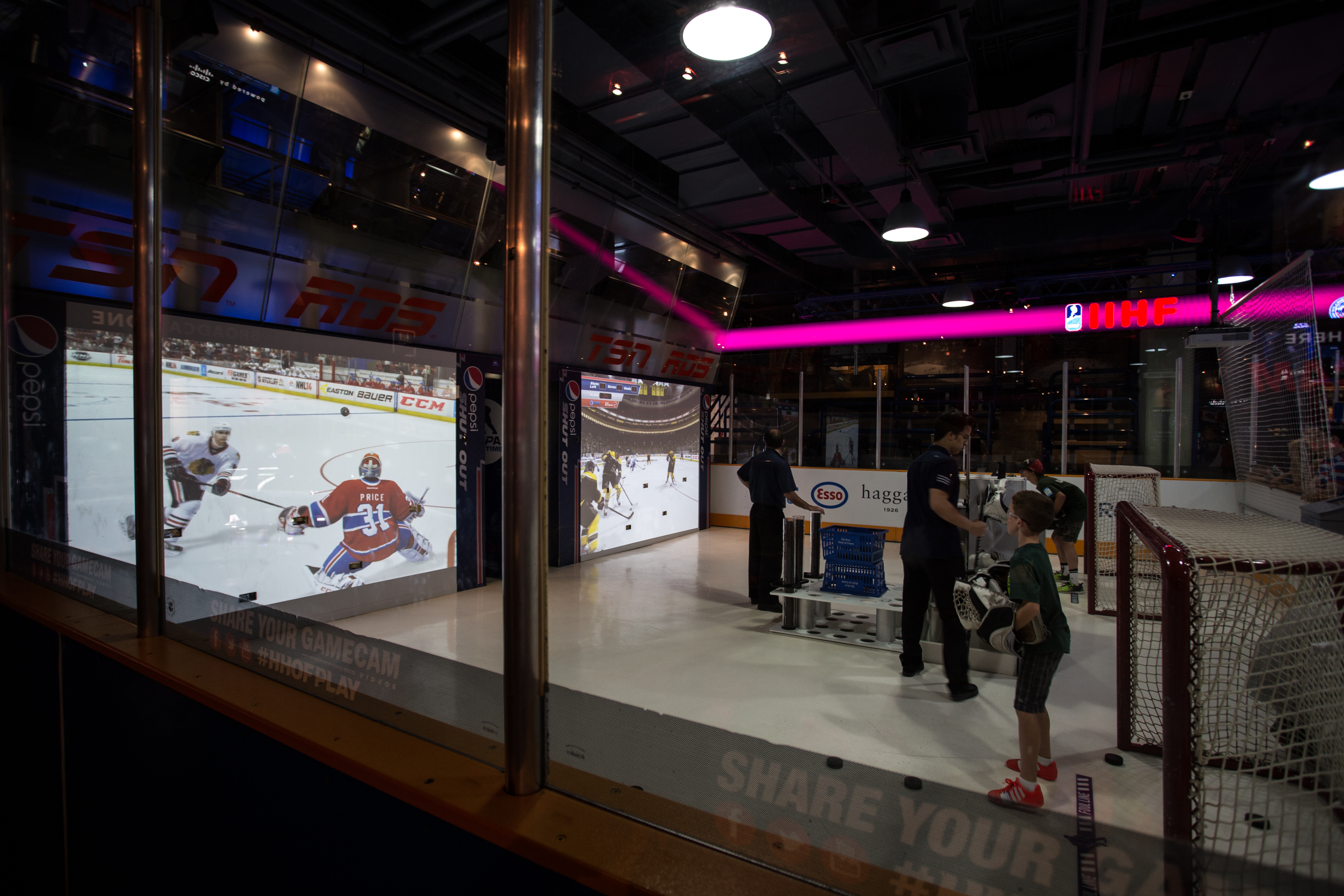
An interactive shootout exhibit at the Hockey Hall of Fame

Interactive displays are featured at the NHLPA Gametime, visitors take shots using real pucks at a computer simulation of goaltender Ed Belfour. Visitors can also take turns playing goaltender, blocking shots from computer simulations of players like Sidney Crosby, Wayne Gretzky and Mark Messier. The TSN/RDS Broadcast Zone provides a look at how hockey broadcasting works and allows users to record messages that may be displayed on both the Hockey Hall of Fame's website, and the TSN/RDS networks.

=== World of Hockey Zone ===
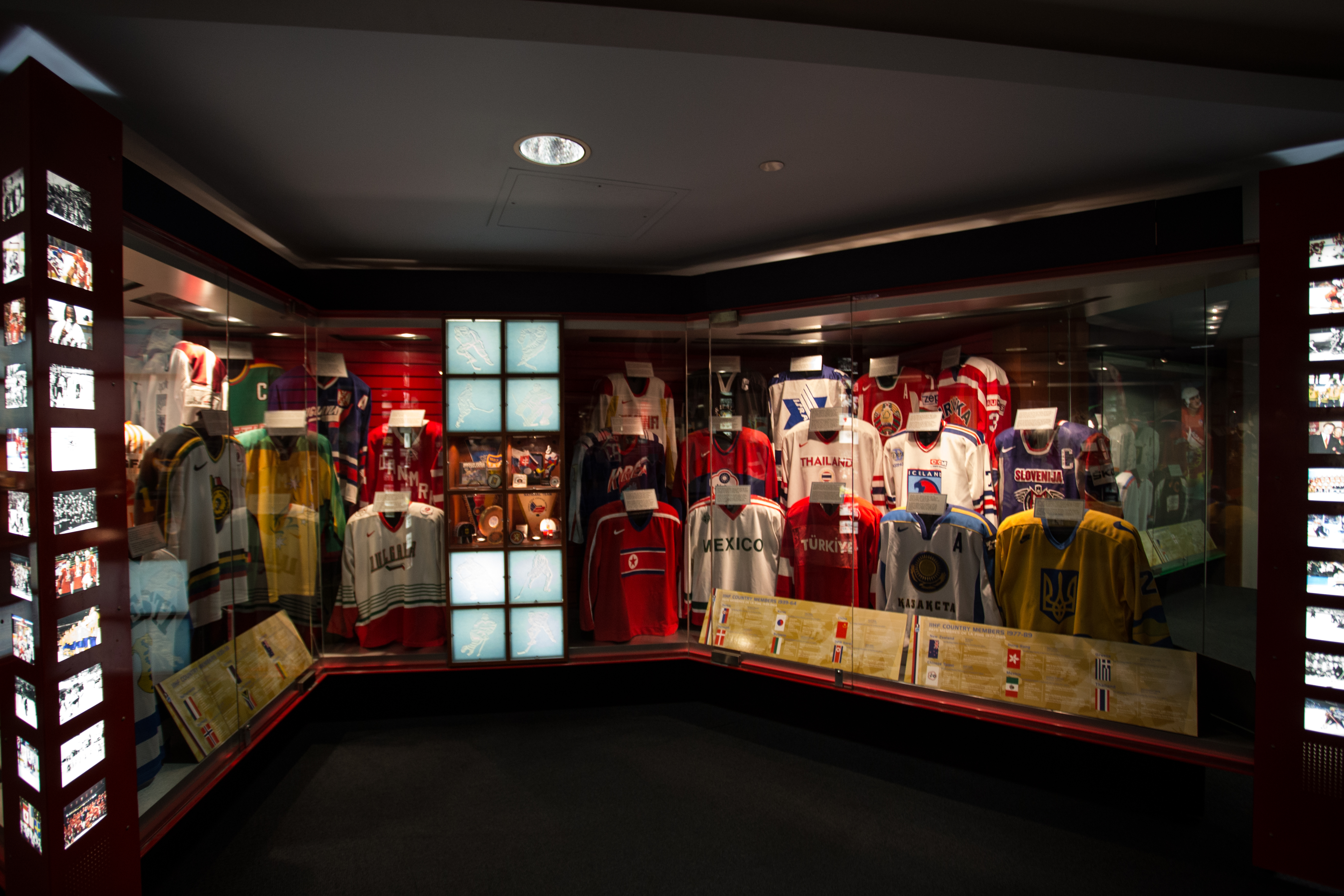
An exhibit of jerseys from several IIHF-member national teams

While many of the Hall of Fame exhibits are dedicated to the NHL, there is a large section devoted to hockey leagues and players outside North America. On June 29, 1998, the World of Hockey Zone opened. It is a 6,000 square feet (600 m^{2}) area dedicated to international hockey, including World and Olympic competition and contains profiles on all International Ice Hockey Federation (IIHF) member countries.

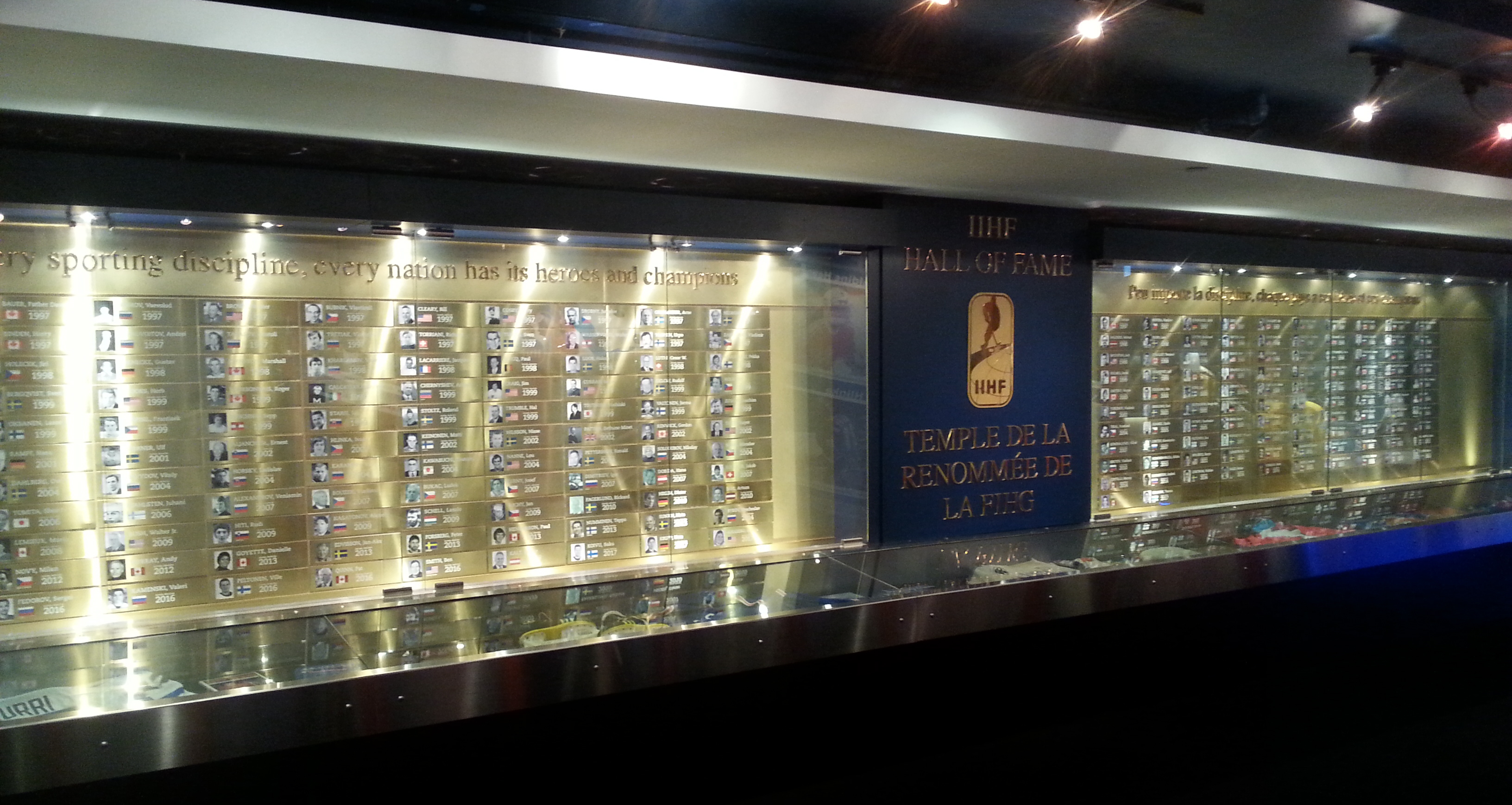
Honour roll for the IIHF Hall of Fame in the World of Hockey Zone

The IIHF agreed to transfer its exhibits from the International Hockey Hall of Fame in Kingston, Ontario, to the Hockey Hall of Fame in 1998. The World of Hockey Zone is sponsored by Tissot. The zone includes the IIHF Hockey Hall of Fame honour roll, listing each inductee by country and year of enshrinement. Each national association member of the IIHF is represented in the collection of artifacts in the display, which includes many national team hockey jerseys. The World of Hockey also recognizes members of the Triple Gold Club, and displays memorabilia from the "Miracle on Ice" at the 1980 Winter Olympic Games. Other notable events included are the 1972 Summit Series, the men's and women's Ice Hockey World Championships, national-level hockey leagues in Europe, the Spengler Cup, the World Cup of Hockey, and the Canada Cup.

A new addition to the World of Hockey is Women's Hockey: Celebrating Excellence. This exhibit takes a deep dive into the history of the women's game and features stories and artifacts beginning with the earliest days of women's hockey and continuing through to the PWHL.

== Hall of Fame ==
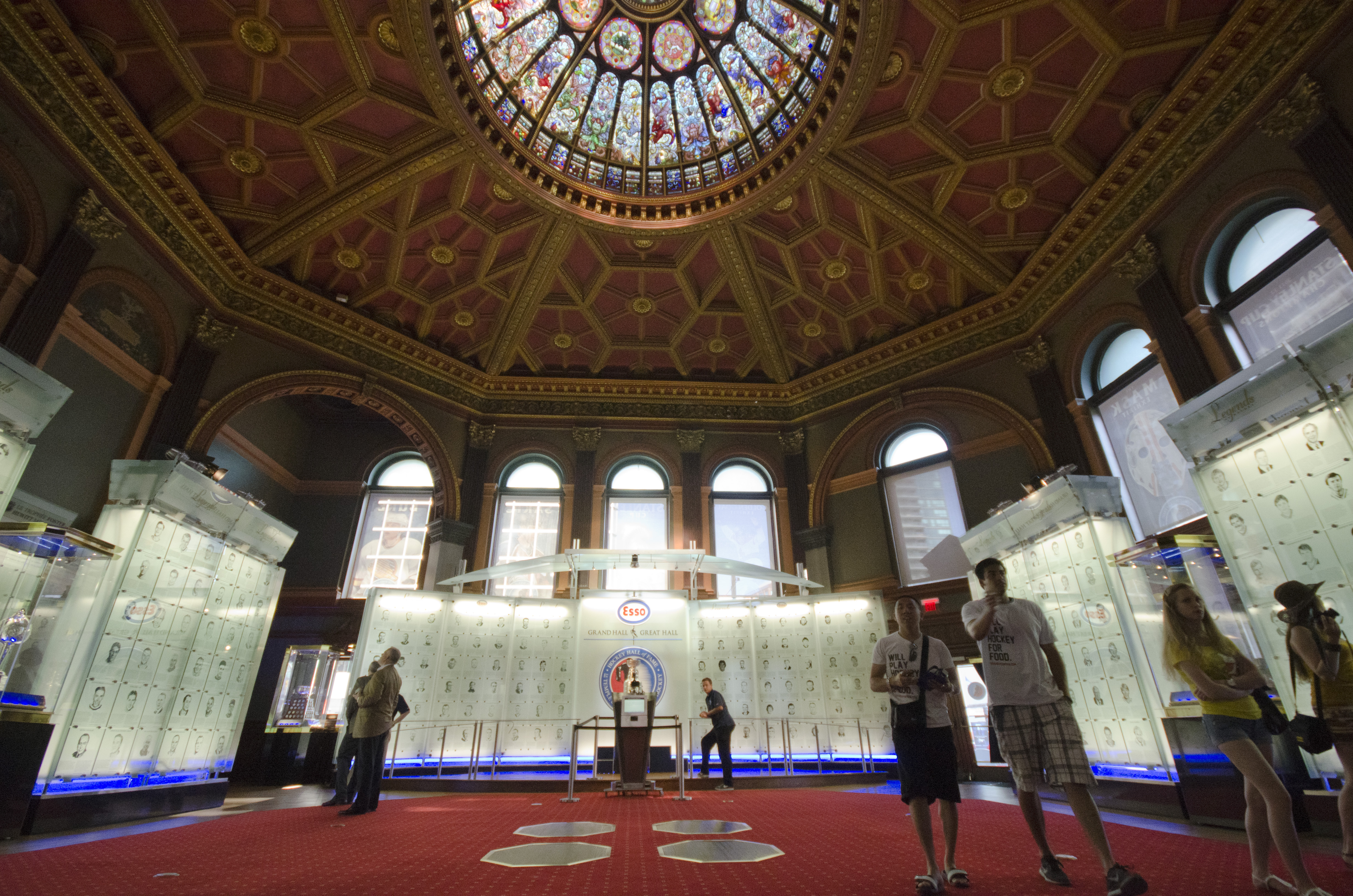
The Great Hall features portraits of every inductee, and displays all of the active NHL trophies

=== Selection process ===
As of 2009, new members can be inducted into the Hockey Hall of Fame as players, builders or on-ice officials. The builders' category includes coaches, general managers, commentators, team owners and others who have helped build the game. The category for on-ice officials was added in 1961 and a "veteran player" category was established in 1988. The purpose of the category was to "provide a vehicle for players who may have been overlooked and whose chances for election would be limited when placed on the same ballot with contemporary players". Eleven players were inducted into that category, but in 2000, the Board of Directors eliminated it; the players who had been inducted under this category were merged into the player category.

Candidates for membership in the Hockey Hall of Fame are nominated by an 18-person selection committee. The committee includes Hockey Hall of Fame members, hockey personnel and media personalities associated with the game; the membership is representative of "areas throughout the world where hockey is popular", and includes at least one member who is knowledgeable about international hockey and one member who is knowledgeable about amateur hockey. Committee members are appointed by the Board of Directors to a three-year term. The terms of the committee members are staggered so that each year there are six newly appointed or reappointed members. As of November 2018, the selection committee includes: chairman John Davidson, James M. Gregory (Chairman Emeritus), and committee members David Branch, Brian Burke, Colin Campbell, Cassie Campbell-Pascall, Mark Chipman, Bob Clarke, Marc de Foy, Michael Farber, Ron Francis, Mike Gartner, Anders Hedberg, Jari Kurri, Igor Larionov, Pierre McGuire, Bob McKenzie, David Poile, and Luc Robitaille.

Each committee member is allowed to nominate one person in each category per year. Nominations must be submitted to the chairman of the board of directors by April 15 of the nomination year. The committee then meets in June where a series of secret ballot votes is held; any player with the support of 75% of the members of the committee present is inducted. If the maximum number of players does not receive 75% after the first round of voting, then run-off votes are held. Players with less than 50% are dropped from consideration for that year and voting continues until either the maximum number of inductees is reached or all remaining nominees receive between 50% and 75%. In any given year, a maximum of four players, two builders, and one on-ice official are inducted as members. Player and on-ice officials must have not participated in a professional or international game for a minimum of three years to be eligible for nomination. Builders may be "active or inactive".

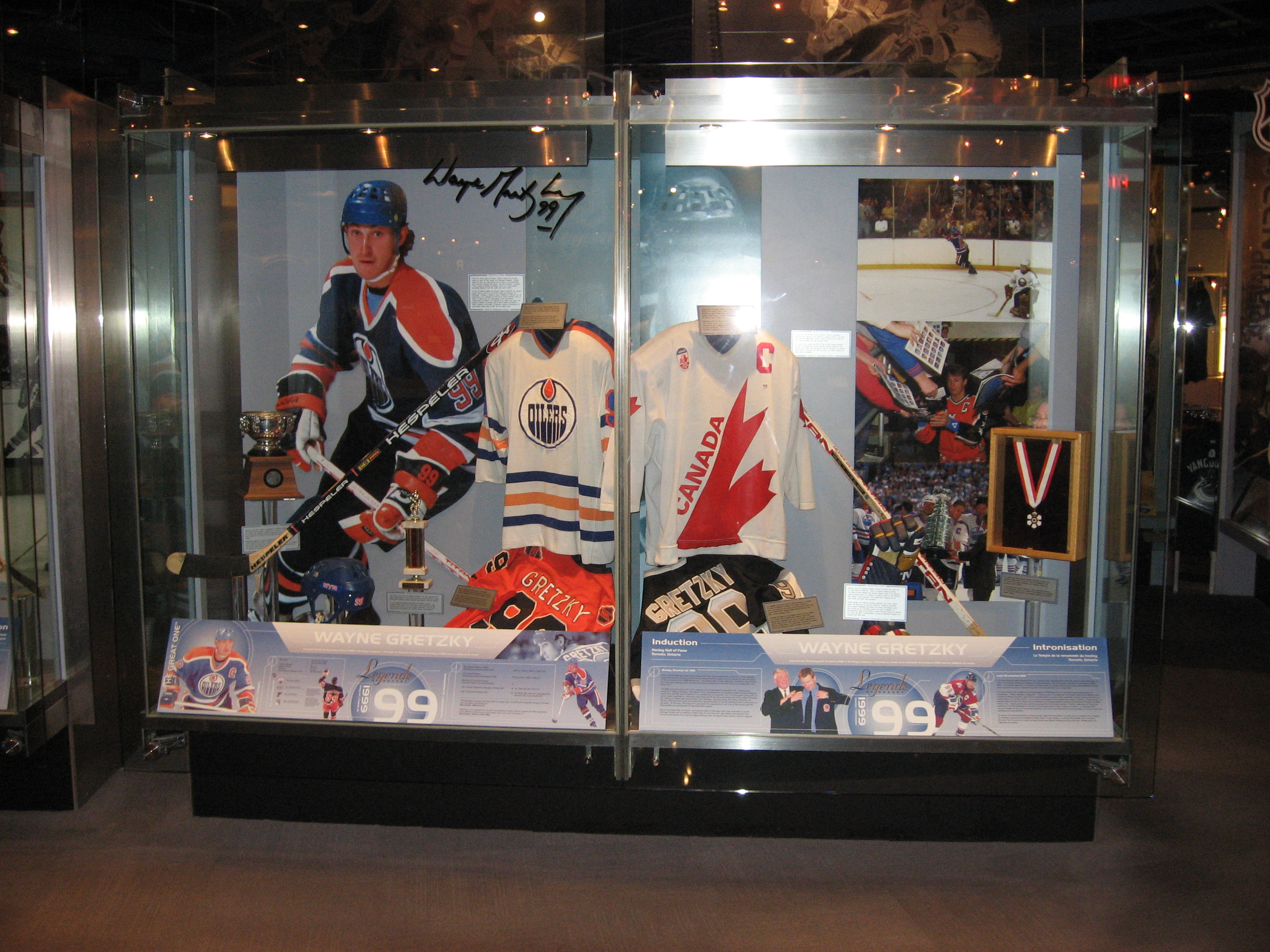
An exhibit at the Hockey Hall of Fame featuring Wayne Gretzky. Gretzky was the last of ten players that saw the Hall's waiting period for inductees waived.

The waiting period was waived for ten players deemed exceptionally notable; Dit Clapper (1947), Maurice Richard (1961), Ted Lindsay (1966), Red Kelly (1969), Terry Sawchuk (1971), Jean Beliveau (1972), Gordie Howe (1972), Bobby Orr (1979), Mario Lemieux (1997), and Wayne Gretzky (1999). Following Gretzky's induction, the Board of Directors determined that the waiting period would no longer be waived for any player except under "certain humanitarian circumstances". Three Hall of Fame members came out of retirement after their induction and resumed a career in the National League: Gordie Howe, Guy Lafleur and Mario Lemieux. Chris Pronger, Shea Weber, and Carey Price were inducted in 2015, 2024, and 2026 while still technically active players; Pronger, Weber, and Price were under contract with the Philadelphia Flyers, the Utah Hockey Club, and the San Jose Sharks at the time of their induction. Pronger's contract expired after the 2016–17 season and Weber's and Price's contracts expired after the 2025–26 season. The Hall of Fame amended its by-laws by introducing the "three-year waiting period", which made Pronger, Weber, and Price eligible for induction since they last played in 2011, 2021, and 2022, respectively.

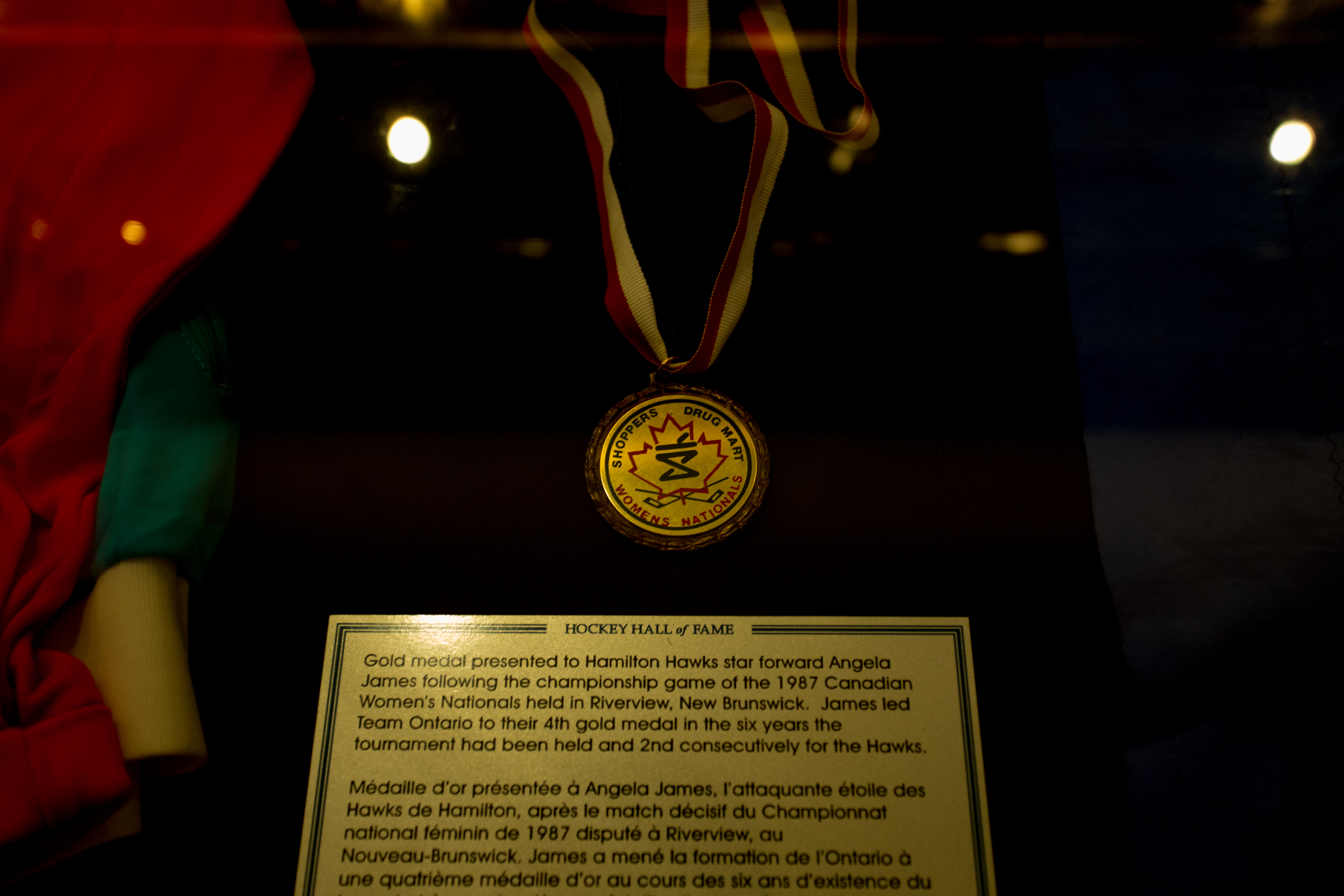
A gold medal awarded to Angela James, a Hockey Hall of Fame inductee, on display at the hall of fame

On March 31, 2009, the Hall of Fame announced new by-law additions which were implemented on January 1, 2010. Starting in 2010, male and female players are considered for induction separately and a maximum of two women can be inducted as players per year. The by-law also clarifies that a builder does not need to have been a coach, manager or executive to be inducted. Although they remain separate categories, the builders and on-ice officials are considered on the same ballot and a combined maximum of two can be inducted each year. The board of directors will now meet at least once every five years to consider potential changes to the limits.

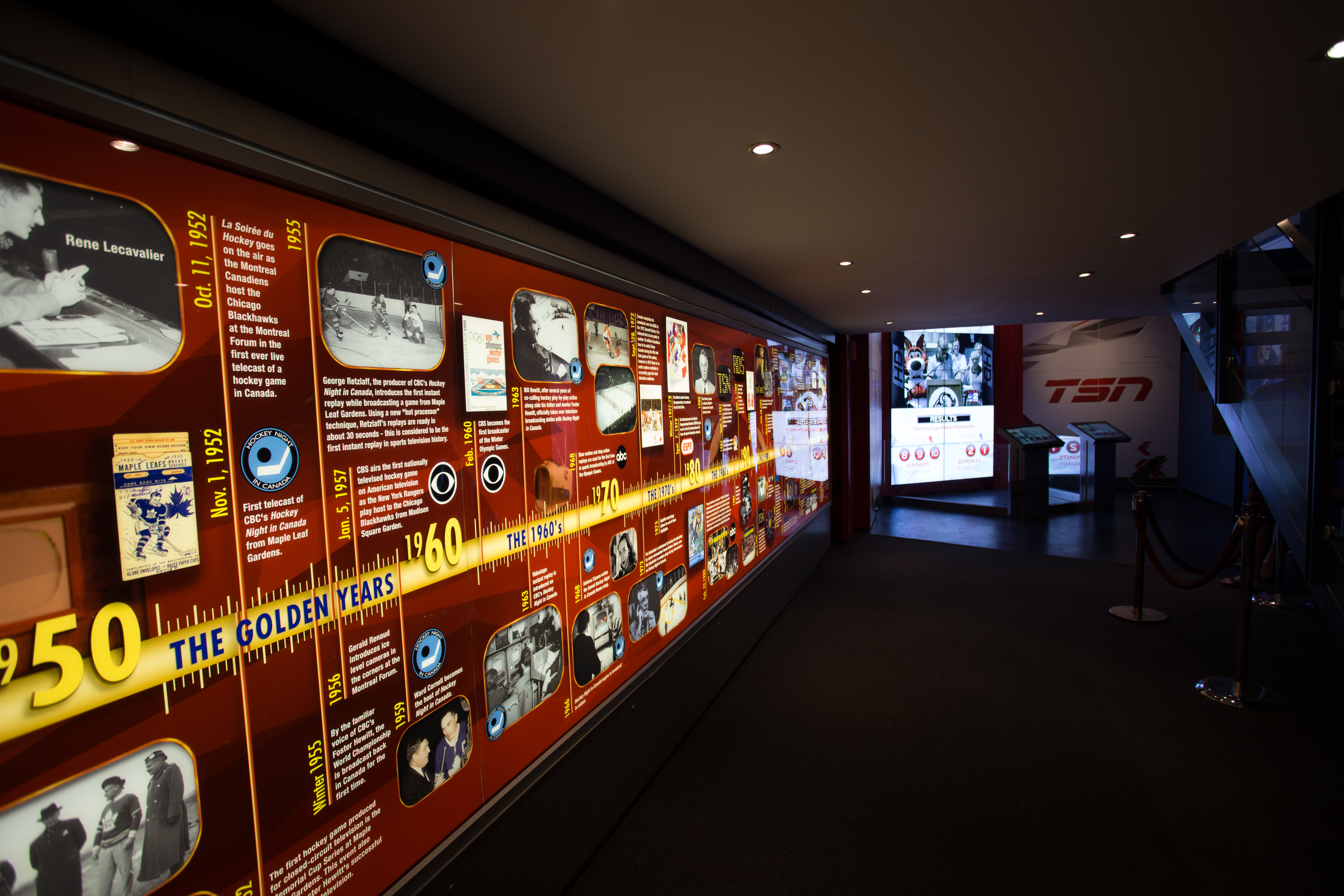
An exhibit at the Hockey Hall of Fame detailing the sport's broadcasting history. The hall of fame also recognizes sports journalists and broadcast personalities.

There is also a category for "Media honourees". The Elmer Ferguson Memorial Award is awarded by the Professional Hockey Writers' Association to "distinguished members of the newspaper profession whose words have brought honour to journalism and to hockey". The Foster Hewitt Memorial Award is awarded by the NHL Broadcasters' Association to "members of the radio and television industry who made outstanding contributions to their profession and the game during their career in hockey broadcasting". The voting for both awards is conducted by their respective associations. While media honourees are not considered full inductees, they are still honoured with a display at the Hockey Hall of Fame. The ceremonies associated with these awards are held separately from the induction of the members of the Hall of Fame. Some of the award winners have also been inducted into the Hall of Fame as builders, including Foster Hewitt.

=== Induction ceremony ===
The induction ceremony was held at the Hall of Fame from 1959 until 1974. In 1975, it was held at the Royal York Hotel in Toronto and would be held there until 1979. From 1980 to 1992, the ceremony was held at various different locations in Toronto, except for 1986, 1987 and 1991 when the ceremonies were held in Vancouver, Detroit and Ottawa respectively. Since 1993, it has been held at the current Hall of Fame building. The ceremony was first broadcast by The Sports Network in 1994.

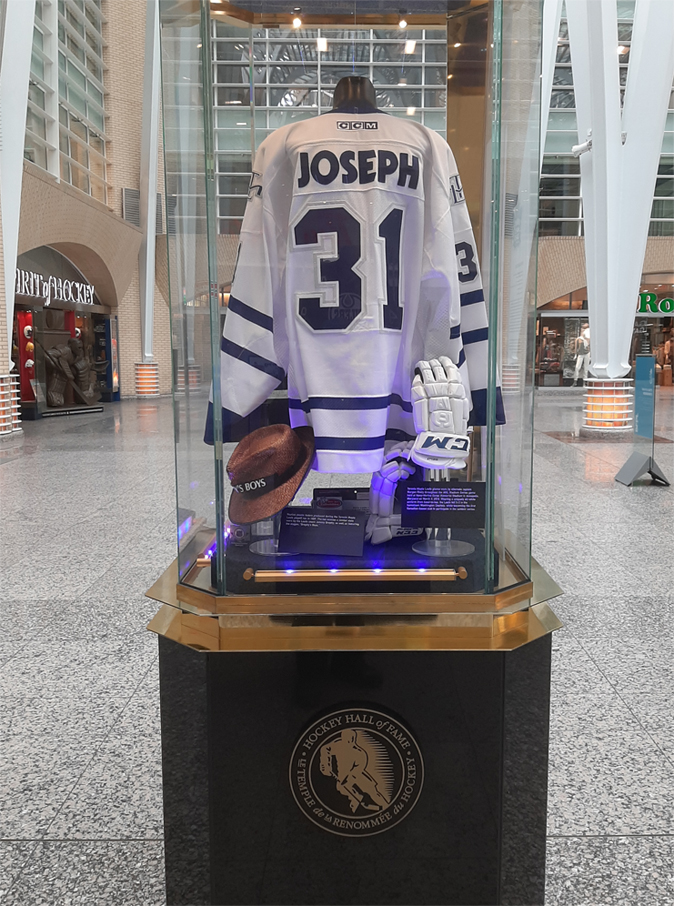
Curtis Joseph's jersey from the 2001 Hockey Hall of Fame game, displayed at the hall of fame entrance inside Brookfield Place

In 1999 the "Hockey Hall of Fame game" was established, a contest between the Toronto Maple Leafs and a visiting team, with a special ceremony honouring that year's inductees held before the game. Robert Tychkowski of the Edmonton Sun reports that many, including Edmonton Oilers president Kevin Lowe, believe the induction ceremony should be held on a night when there are no NHL games scheduled. This would allow a more representative portion of the hockey world to attend.

=== Criticism ===
The Hall of Fame has been criticized for inducting several lacklustre candidates in the early 2000s decade due to "a shortage of true greatness". Since then, some have claimed that the Hall of Fame has become too exclusive. The Hall of Fame has also been criticized for failing to induct international players; critics re-emphasized, from 2005 to 2007, that the Hall has been far too focused on the National Hockey League, that it is more of an "NHL Hall of Fame" than a general Hockey Hall of Fame. Partially in response to these claims, the Hall of Fame has hosted International Ice Hockey Federation (IIHF) exhibits and the IIHF Hall of Fame since 1998, and announced that it would start looking at more international players for induction. While Vladislav Tretiak had been a notable inductee in 1989, Valeri Kharlamov was inducted in 2005, and is one of the few other modern-day inductees to never play in the NHL. The Hall of Fame has also been criticized for overlooking World Hockey Association players and overrepresenting the Original Six era from 1942 to 1967. For several years, the Hall of Fame was criticized for overlooking female hockey players before the Hall of Fame announced that women would be given separate consideration. In 2010, Angela James and Cammi Granato were the first women to be inducted into the Hall of Fame.

One of the most discussed potential nominees is Paul Henderson, who scored the winning goal in the final moments of the deciding eighth game of the 1972 Summit Series between Canada and the Soviet Union. This is one of the best-known moments in hockey and Canadian sports history. While there is little question of the historical significance of that goal, Henderson's NHL statistics are not at a level comparable to those players usually selected for induction. His candidacy led to many debates among hockey fans and columnists.

=== Controversy ===
==== Conn Smythe resignation ====
Conn Smythe served as the Hall's chairman for several years, but resigned in June 1971 when Harvey "Busher" Jackson was posthumously elected into the Hall. Smythe said that it made him sick to think of Jackson alongside such Toronto Maple Leafs players as "Apps, Primeau, Conacher, Clancy and Kennedy. If the standards are going to be lowered I'll get out as chairman of the board." Jackson was notorious for his off-ice lifestyle of drinking and broken marriages. Smythe would not condone the induction and even tried to block it because he considered Jackson a poor role model. Frank J. Selke, head of the selection committee, defended the selection on the belief that a man should not be shut out "because of the amount of beer he drank".

==== Gil Stein dispute ====
On March 30, 1993, it was announced that Gil Stein, who at the time had been president of the National Hockey League for nine months but had been overlooked for the new job of commissioner in favour of Gary Bettman, would be inducted into the Hall of Fame. There were immediate allegations that he had engineered his election through manipulation of the Hall's board of directors. Due to these allegations, NHL commissioner Gary Bettman hired two independent lawyers, Arnold Burns and Yves Fortier, to lead an investigation. They concluded that Stein had "improperly manipulated the process" and "created the false appearance and illusion" that his nomination was the idea of Bruce McNall. They concluded that Stein pressured McNall to nominate him and had refused to withdraw his nomination when asked to do so by Bettman. There was a dispute over McNall's role and Stein was "categorical in stating that the idea was Mr. McNall's". They recommended that Stein's selection be overturned, but it was revealed Stein had decided to turn down the induction before their announcement.

==== Alan Eagleson resignation ====
In 1989, Alan Eagleson, a longtime executive director of the National Hockey League Players' Association (NHLPA), was inducted as a builder. He resigned nine years later from the Hall after pleading guilty to mail fraud and embezzling hundreds of thousands of dollars from the NHLPA pension funds. His resignation came six days before a vote was scheduled to determine if he should be expelled from the Hall. Originally, the Hall of Fame was not going to become involved in the issue, but was forced to act when dozens of inductees, including Bobby Orr, Ted Lindsay and Brad Park, campaigned for Eagleson's expulsion, even threatening to renounce their membership if he was not removed. He became the first member of a sports hall of fame in North America to resign.

== See also ==
- Ford Performance Centre, home of Hockey Hall of Fame archive and research centre
- List of halls and walks of fame
- List of museums in Toronto

== Sources ==
- Honoured members: the Hockey Hall of Fame. Canada: Fenn Publishing. 2003. ISBN 1-55168-239-7.
- Official Guide to the Players of the Hockey Hall of Fame. Canada: Firefly Books. 2010. ISBN 978-1-55407-662-8.
- Hockey Hall of Fame Book of Goalies. Canada: Firefly Books. 2010. ISBN 978-1-55407-644-4.
