= Lefty Reid =

Canadian curator (1927–2020)

Maurice H. "Lefty" Reid
- Born: Maurice H. Reid; September 25, 1927
- Died: August 15, 2020 (aged 92)

Maurice H. "Lefty" Reid (25 September 1927 – 15 August 2020) was a curator of the Hockey Hall of Fame (1967-1992), based in Toronto, Ontario, Canada.

He was raised in Blytheswood (now Leamington, Ontario), and Reid worked at the Peterborough Examiner then later moved to Toronto to work at The Toronto Telegram as sports layout editor.

While there, he began volunteering at the Hockey Hall of Fame before being hired as curator.

Reid was initially responsible for both the Hockey Hall of Fame and Canada's Sports Hall of Fame, both of which were housed in a small building on the grounds of the Canadian National Exhibition. Then from the time of the retirement of Bobby Hewitson in 1967, until Reid's own retirement in 1992, when Scotty Morrison took over the reins, Reid took what he described as " a basement full of old sticks and pucks" and helped to create a truly great museum.

Reid was also secretary of the Hockey Hall of Fame selection committee during his tenure with the Hall.

He also held many positions with ASMHOF (Association of Halls of Fame and Museums) including President and Vice President.

In his retirement, Reid returned to Peterborough, where he was honoured with a key to the city after voluntarily helping to create a new sports hall of fame there.

He was inducted into the Peterborough and District Sports Hall of Fame in 2006. https://pdshof.com/inductees/maurice-lefty-reid/

Reid had been a competitive bowler and was vice-president of Ontario Bowlers Council from 1959 to 1962. Reid still holds the Peterborough city 3 game five pin record of 1143. As a softball pitcher, he played from the 1940s to the 1980s. Reid was the first left handed windmill pitcher in Ontario.
