= ChromaZone/Chromatique Collective =

Canadian art collective (1981–1986)

ChromaZone/Chromatique
- Formation: 1981; 45 years ago
- Founder: Andy Fabo, Oliver Girling, Sybil Goldstein, Rae Johnson, Hans-Peter Marti and Tony Wilson
- Type: Art collective
- Legal status: Charity
- Purpose: to exhibit figurative visual art and to provide gallery space for emerging artists
- Headquarters: Toronto, Ont., Canada
- Region served: Canada
- Official language: English

ChromaZone/Chromatique Collective and gallery was founded in Toronto in 1981. It was a significant artist-run movement which acted as a spearhead for Toronto's emerging visual art scene in the early eighties. The founders were Andy Fabo, Oliver Girling, Sybil Goldstein, Rae Johnson, H-P. Marti and Tony Wilson but concurrently, connected to the Collective were other artists such as Brian Burnett, Chrysanne Stathacos and many others. (Note: For an almost complete Chronology by Sybil Goldstein which lists the artists in the shows, except for the artists who participated in Chromaliving, see the "ChromaZone/Chromatique Chronology" by Sybil Goldstein in the ChromaZone/Chromatique file in the Art Gallery of Ontario Edward P. Taylor Research Library and Archives.)

ChromaZone artists were committed to a figurative expressive style and an attachment to the tactility of painting, features of the Neo-Expressionist resurgence of painting and drawing of the early 1980s in New York and Berlin, but were inclusive of other modes and mediums. The importance of the collective for ChromaZone lay in the reception of an artist's work.

To that end, the Collective and do-it-yourself gallery presented the work of many artists in both their short-lived exhibition space - Girling's apartment—and throughout Toronto at various satellite venues, and even in exhibitions nationally and abroad. As a result, ChromaZone changed the general sensibility surrounding artist-initiated activity such as exhibitions.

The inaugural ChromaZone exhibition was titled Mondo Chroma (1981) and included images of the daily and working life of people. It was followed by poetry readings, send-ups of fashion shows, performances, video and film screenings and exhibitions of various like-minded artists in Toronto, New York (Note: The show seemed to "galvanize " The scene, wrote one critic who called the artworks "urgent in style". In 1982, the exhibition included 22 artists from New York such as Sherrie Levine, Julian Schnabel and Cindy Sherman, see Goldstein list.) and Berlin curated by ChromaZone members. (Note: See list of exhibitions by Goldstein.) In 1982, the collaboration co-curated OKromazone: Die Anderen von Kanada, an exhibition at the Institut Unzeit in West Berlin featuring work by 22 contemporary Toronto artists.

In 1983, Jocelyn and his partner Fabo curated the monumental Chromaliving, which exhibited rooms and furniture by more than 150 artists and designers in 10,00 square feet of retail space in the Colonnade on Bloor Street. (Note: A list of the participating artists in Chromaliving is available in the ChromaZone/Chromatique file in the Art Gallery of Ontario Edward P. Taylor Research Library and Archives.) It became a key happening in the Toronto art world and included makers of all kinds, including then emerging artists such as Joanne Tod and Evan Penny.

Other exhibitions took place in 1983 at the Mackenzie Art Gallery, Regina, with a catalogue by art critic Richard Rhodes; in 1984/1986 at the Concordia Art Gallery at Concordia University, Montreal; and in 1985, at Galerie Obscure, Alma, Québec, and elsewhere. In 1985, ChromaZone had its last show, Fire + Ice with sculptor Renée van Halm and other artists, in Switzerland and in 1986 decided to formally disband.

Reaction to ChromaZone in its lifetime was both positive and negative — the latter perhaps due to its members' youth and inclusive attitude, or because of the idea that their project was not intellectual enough. Since then, there have been several shows at different institutions that pay tribute to the collective such as Exquisite ChromaZone in 1997 at Paul Petro Contemporary Art in Toronto or historicize the time period — at the Art Gallery of York University, Toronto, the Art Museum at University of Toronto and the Art Gallery of Ontario. In 2011, This Is Paradise was held at the Museum of Contemporary Art Toronto Canada, co-curated by Rae Johnson and Jonathan Shaughnessy and featuring an array of work in all media produced mostly in the 1980s by 47 artists who were key players on the scene; and in 2016, Chroma Lives, a recreation using the work of living artists in a Yorkville, Toronto condo show suite. Archival material covering the history of the group is held in both the Library and Archives of the National Gallery of Canada (gift of Andy Fabo) and in the Art Gallery of Ontario, Edward P. Taylor Research Library and Archives.
