= Bobby Hewitson =

Canadian ice hockey referee (1892–1969)

- Hockey Hall of Fame, 1963 (Official)
- Born: January 23, 1892 Toronto, Ontario, Canada
- Died: January 9, 1969 (aged 76)
- Playing career: 1920–1934

Robert Wilford Hewitson (January 23, 1892 – January 9, 1969) was a Canadian ice hockey official who worked as a referee in the National Hockey League from 1920 to 1934.

== Career ==
Hewiston worked as linesman in the National Hockey League from 1920 to 1934. He was also the first curator of the Hockey Hall of Fame in Toronto. In 1963, he was inducted into the Hockey Hall of Fame for his service to ice hockey.

Hewitson and Ivan Miller were organizers the Ontario Sportswriters and Sportscasters Association (OSSA), and established the annual OSSA Sports Celebrities Dinner for charity. The first dinner was held on March 13, 1952, benefitting the Ontario Society for Crippled Children. (Note: The Sports Celebrities Dinner later became the Rogers-Conn Smythe Sports Celebrities Dinner & Auction in support of Easter Seals.)
