= John Loxley =

Canadian economist (1942–2020)

John Loxley (1942—28 July 2020) was a Canadian economist.

Loxley obtained a doctorate in economics at the University of Leeds, completing his doctoral dissertation, The development of the monetary and financial system of the East African currency area 1950 to 1964 in 1966. He began teaching at the University of Manitoba in 1977. Over the course of his career, Loxley was elected a fellow of the Royal Society of Canada, received the Distinguished Academic Award from the Canadian Association of University Teachers in 2008, followed by the Progressive Economists' Forum's 2008 Galbraith Prize in Economics and Social Justice. In 2019, the Errol Black Chair in Labour Issues at the Manitoba office of the Canadian Centre for Policy Alternatives honoured Loxley at the eighth Errol Black Chair Fund Raiser. Loxley died on 28 July 2020, aged 77.
