= Roy Little Chief =

Chief of the Siksika Nation (1938–2020)

Roy Little Chief (August 26, 1938 – June 11, 2020) was a Canadian Siksika elder and former Chief of the Siksika Nation from 1981 to 1983. He was a longtime activist for the rights of First Nations and indigenous people in Canada.

== Biography ==
Roy Little Chief was born in the Blackfoot Hospital on the Siksika Nation of southern Alberta on August 26, 1938. His maternal grandfather, Eagle Rib, another former Siksika Nation Chief, had signed Treaty 7 in 1877. Little Chief attended residential schools at Crowfoot-Blackfoot and Erminskin-Hobbema, as well as St. Thomas College in North Battleford, Saskatchewan.

He began working with the Indian Association of Alberta in the late 1960s. Roy Little Chief publicly opposed the 1969 White Paper, proposed by Canadian Prime Minister Pierre Trudeau, which proposed, among other things, eliminating of separate legal status for First Nations in Canada. The White Paper was withdrawn in 1970 due to widespread opposition from First Nations leaders and activists, including Little Chief. During the 1970s, Little Chief traveled to Ottawa to lobby against the abolition of the Siksika Nation's police department. However, he lost this fight and control of Siksika Nation's policing was transferred to the Royal Canadian Mounted Police (RCMP).

Little Chief served on several boards and committees during his career, including the first Calgary Aboriginal Urban Affairs Committee, the National Anti Poverty Organization, and the Calgary Urban Treaty Alliance, which he also co-founded. Notably, he was a member of the National Residential School Survivors Society, which successfully lobbied for reparations for the survivors of the Canadian Indian residential school system and the creation of the Truth and Reconciliation Commission of Canada.

Little Chief was also involved in Siksika Nation politics. He was first elected to the Siksika Nation Council in a special by-election. He was then elected Chief of the Siksika Nation from 1981 to 1983. He later served as the chair of the Siksika police commission.

Additionally, Little Chief was a founding member of the Blackfoot A1 Drum Group, which performed at powwows and other cultural events throughout Canada and the United States.

In 2002, Roy Little Chief was awarded the Queen Elizabeth II Golden Jubilee Medal for his activism on behalf of Canadian First Nations.

Roy Little Chief died at Peter Lougheed Centre hospital in Calgary, Alberta, on June 11, 2020, at the age of 81, following months of declining health. He was survived by his wife, Linda Little Chief (Cheechoo), their six children, several grandchildren, and one great-grandchild. His memorial service was held at the Gordon Yellow Fly Memorial Arbour on the Siksika Nation.
