= Roger Nicolet =

Belgian engineer (1931–2020)

- Born: 18 December 1931; Brussels, Belgium
- Died: 18 January 2020 (aged 88); Austin, Quebec, Canada
- Occupation: Engineer

Roger Nicolet (18 December 1931 – 18 January 2020) was a Belgian engineer. He oversaw several major building projects, including Place Bonaventure, Le Village Olympique, Place Montreal Trust, Royal Bank Plaza, the CN Tower, King Abdulaziz University, the Louvre Pyramid, and the Tehran International Tower. He was an Officer of the National Order of Quebec.
