= Norene Gilletz =

Canadian cookbook writer (1940–2020)

- Born: Norene Lynn Rykiss; 29 May 1940; Winnipeg, Manitoba
- Died: 23 February 2020 (aged 79); Montreal, Quebec
- Resting place: Baron de Hirsch Cemetery
- Occupation: Cookbook writer
- Spouse: Joel Gilletz (m. 1960)
- Website: gourmania.com

Norene Lynn Gilletz (née Rykiss; 29 May 1940 – 23 February 2020) was a Canadian Jewish cookbook writer, food consultant, and food writer.

== Biography ==
Norene Gilletz was born in Winnipeg, Manitoba to Belle (née Winer) and Max Rykiss. She spent her formative years in Winnipeg's North End and River Heights neighbourhoods, and attended Kelvin High School. She won a scholarship to study German at the University of Manitoba, but ultimately attended secretarial college.

Gilletz moved to Montreal in 1960, where she raised her family, later relocating to Toronto. Her writing career began in 1968 with the release of Second Helpings, Please!, edited by Gilletz and published by the Mount Sinai Chapter of B'nai Brith Women of Canada. By 2020, the cookbook was in its 17th printing and had sold over 200,000 copies.

Several years after the introduction into the North American market of the food processor by Cuisinart, Gilletz published The Pleasures of Your Processor (1980; later renamed The Food Processor Bible). Among her other cookbooks are MicroWays, MealLeaniYumm! (later titled Healthy Helpings), and Norene’s Healthy Kitchen.

Gilletz died in Montreal on 23 February 2020, at the age of 79.

== Partial bibliography ==
- Second Helpings, Please!. Montreal: B'nai Brith Women of Canada. 1968.
- Pleasures of Your Processor. Montreal: J. & N. Publishing. 1979. ISBN 978-0-9690411-0-8.
- MicroWays. Montreal: J. & N. Publishing. 1989. ISBN 978-0-9690411-2-2.
- MealLeaniYumm!: All That's Missing Is the Fat!. Toronto: Gourmania. 1998. ISBN 978-0-9697972-2-7.
- Norene's Healthy Kitchen: Eat Your Way to Good Health. Vancouver: Whitecap Books. 2007. ISBN 978-1-55285-802-8.
- The New Food Processor Bible. Vancouver: Whitecap Books. 2011. ISBN 978-1-77050-028-0.
- The Low Iodine Diet Cookbook: Easy and Delicious Recipes and Tips for Thyroid Cancer Patients. Lexington: Your Health Press. 2012. ISBN 978-0-9851568-4-8.
- The Brain Boosting Diet: Feed Your Memory. Toronto: Whitecap Books. 2020. ISBN 978-17705032-1-2.
