= Jean-Marc Chaput =

Canadian public speaker and author (1930–2020)

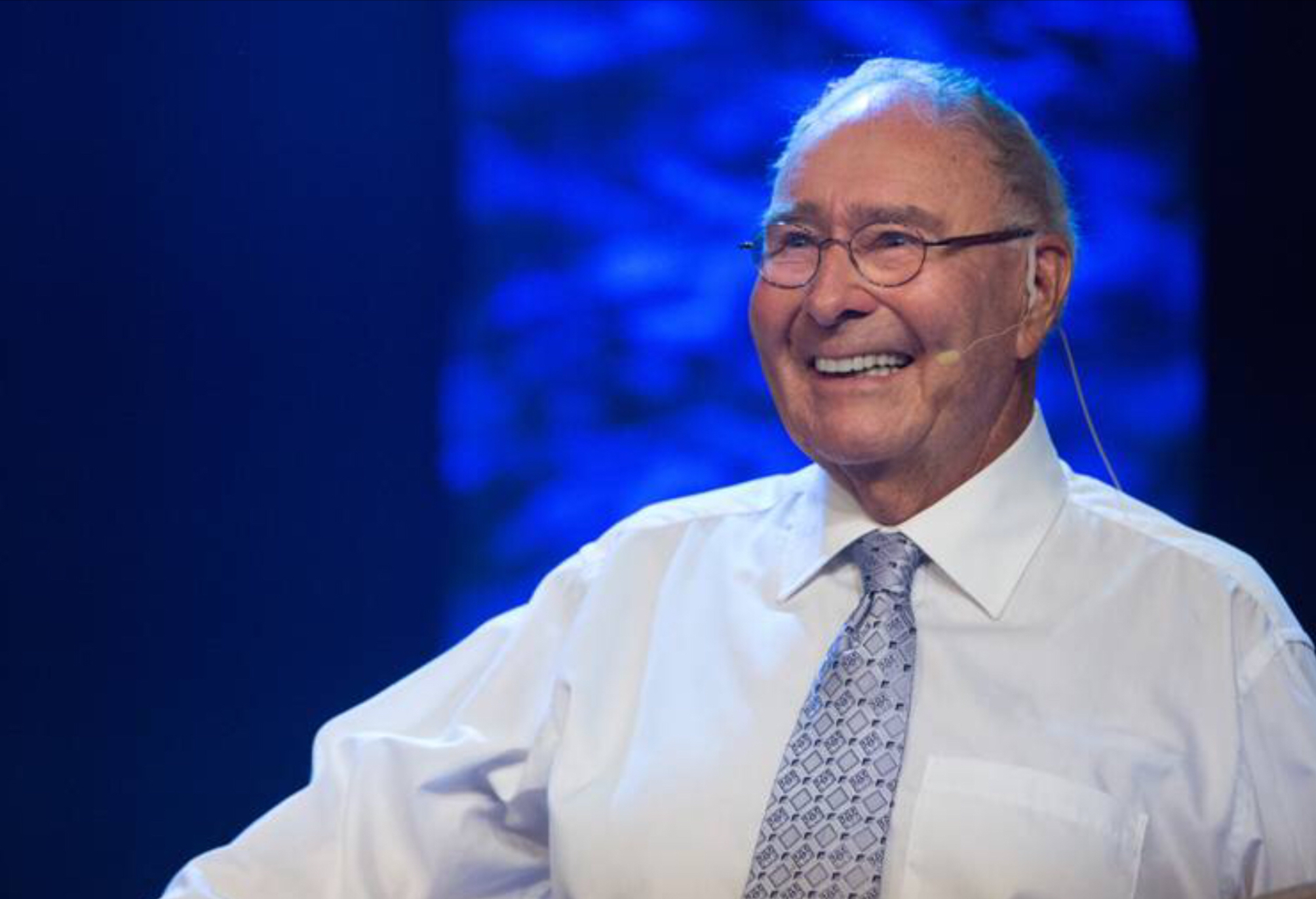
- Jean-Marc Chaputin
- Born: 6 November 1930; Montreal, Quebec, Canada
- Died: 6 June 2020 (aged 89); Montreal, Quebec, Canada
- Occupations: Public Speaker; Author

Jean-Marc Chaput (6 November 1930 – 6 June 2020) was a Canadian public speaker and author.

== Biography ==
The son of Robert Chaput and Gladys Reid, Jean-Marc Chaput spent his childhood on 4e Avenue, between Rue Masson and Saint Joseph Boulevard. He attended Collège Ahuntsic, Collège Sainte-Marie de Montréal, and HEC Montréal. On 14 February 1953, he married Céline Graton at Saint-Nicolas d'Ahuntsic in Montreal. The couple had five children: Patrick, François, Isabelle, Pierre-Yves, and Geneviève. They also had 21 grandchildren.

Chaput died on 6 June 2020 in Montreal due to bone cancer at the age of 89.

== Publications ==
- À la recherche de l'humain, une recherche du bonheur et de nos possibilités (1988)
- Politiquement incorrect (2006)
- À la recherche de l'humain (2007)
- Une vie d'amour et d'épreuves (2011)
