= Louis Fortier =

Canadian biologist (1953–2020)

Louis Fortier OC OQ (25 October 1953 – 4 October 2020) was a biologist and oceanographer from Québec, Canada.

== Career ==
Fortier studied at the Laval and McGill Universities. He was project manager for the Amundsen Arctic research project, and scientific Director of ArcticNet. In 2013 he held the Canada Research Chair on the Response of Arctic Marine Ecosystems to Climate Change at Laval University.

Fortier died of complications resulting from treatment for leukemia on 4 October 2020, aged 66.

== Awards ==
- 2012 – Timothy R. Parsons Award for excellence in Ocean Sciences
- 2012 – Garfield Weston Family Prize for Lifetime Achievement in Northern Research
- 2010 – Prix Armand-Frappier du Québec for Excellence in Research and Research Development
- 2009 – Stefansson Medal of the Explorers Club
- 2008 – Personnalité scientifique by Le Soleil and Radio-Canada
- 2008 – Officer of the National Order of Quebec
- 2007 – Honorary PhD, University of Manitoba
- 2007 – Officer of the Order of Canada
- 2006 – Grand Diplomé and Gloire de l’Escolle Medal of the Alumni Association of Université Laval
- 2005 – «Personnalité scientifique de l'Année» by La Presse and Radio-Canada
- 2004 – «Scientifique de l’Année» by Radio-Canada
