= Paul Cholakis =

Canadian football player (1928–2020)

Profile
- Position: Halfback

Personal information
- Born: June 23, 1928; Winnipeg, Manitoba, Canada
- Died: May 3, 2020 (aged 91); Winnipeg, Manitoba, Canada
- Listed height: 5 ft 8 in (1.73 m)
- Listed weight: 160 lb (73 kg)

Career history
- 1949–1950: Winnipeg Blue Bombers

Paul Cholakis (June 23, 1928 – May 3, 2020) was a Canadian professional football player who played for the Winnipeg Blue Bombers. He previously played for at the University of Manitoba.
