= 2020 Quebec City stabbing =

2020 Stabbing spree attack

2020 Quebec City Halloween stabbing
- Location: Quebec City, Quebec, Canada
- Date: 31 October 2020 c. 10:30 p.m. (UTC-4:00)
- Target: Passers-by
- Attack type: Mass stabbing
- Weapon: Japanese sword
- Deaths: 2
- Injuries: 5
- Perpetrator: Carl Girouard
- Motive: Unknown

On 31 October 2020, two people were stabbed to death and five others injured near the Parliament Building in the Old Quebec neighbourhood of Quebec City, Quebec, Canada. The perpetrator, 24-year-old Carl Girouard, was arrested immediately following the attack.

== Incident ==
On the night of Halloween 2020, at about 10:30 p.m. local time, a man dressed in either a medieval costume or a kimono carried out a mass stabbing in Quebec City, attacking people with a katana-style sabre near the provincial legislature, the National Assembly of Quebec. The victims were chosen at random. Two people were killed, Suzanne Clermont, a 61-year-old woman and François Duchesne, a 56-year-old man, and five others were injured.

== Perpetrator ==
Carl Girouard, a 24-year-old man from Sainte-Thérèse on Montreal's North Shore, was arrested. The police reported that the attacker was prepared to inflict as much damage as possible, and had gasoline containers in his car. The man was not affiliated with any terror group, according to police, but his motivations are unknown. Police said that the man had, five years prior, expressed to a doctor threats to perform similar actions.

On 18 June 2021, Prosecutor François Godin filed a direct indictment, with Girouard set to go directly to trial without a preliminary hearing.

On 20 May 2022, after five days of deliberation, Carl Girouard was convicted of the first degree murders of François Duchesne and Suzanne Clermont. He faced life in prison with no possibility of parole within the next 25 years.

On 10 June of the same year, Girouard was sentenced to life imprisonment with possibility of parole after 25 years.
