= Bob Steiner =

Canadian football player (1946–2020)

No. 63
- Positions: Tackle, Defensive tackle

Personal information
- Born: March 6, 1946
- Died: February 25, 2020 (aged 73); Burlington, Ontario, Canada
- Listed height: 6 ft 4 in (1.93 m)
- Listed weight: 250 lb (113 kg)

Career history
- 1966–1971: Hamilton Tiger-Cats
- 1972: Edmonton Eskimos

Awards and highlights
- Grey Cup champion (1967)

Robert Albert Steiner (March 6, 1946 – February 25, 2020) was a Canadian football player who played for the Hamilton Tiger-Cats and Edmonton Eskimos. He won the Grey Cup with Hamilton in 1967.
