= Jean Nichol =

Canadian singer (1944–2020)

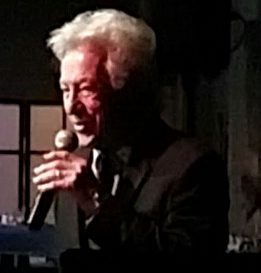
- Jean Nichol au 1323
- Born: Louis Simoneau; 8 December 1944; Windsor, Quebec, Canada
- Died: 11 May 2020 (aged 75)
- Occupation: Singer

Jean Nichol (stage name of Louis Simoneau) (8 December 1944 – 11 May 2020) was a Canadian singer and songwriter.

== Biography ==
Nichol performed with the group Les Commandeurs from 1962 to 1966. He also sang in bars under the name Maxime. He was discovered by Guy Cloutier, who became his manager and helped him adopt the name Jean Nichol. He experienced success in 1970 with the song "Oh Lady Mary", and he subsequently participated in the Musicorama tour. He often recorded French language versions of the songs of Tom Jones. He would perform at the Place des Arts in Montreal and the Grand Théâtre de Québec in Quebec City. He continued recording into the 1980s, with a little less success.

== Discography ==
- Jean Nichol sur scène (1970)
- Oh Lady Mary (1970)
- Sans toi (1971)
- Jean Nichol (1971)
- Pour vous (1973)
- Angélique (1974)
- Cette femme (1976)
- Disons-nous adieu (1978)
- 16 grands succès (1998)
- 24 chansons d'amour (1999)
