= Gaston Roberge =

French Canadian Jesuit priest (1935–2020)

Fr. Gaston Roberge (27 May 1935 – August 26, 2020) was a French Canadian Jesuit priest; film theorist; pioneer of the film appreciation movement in India; founder, with full support of Satyajit Ray, of Chitrabani (1970), the oldest media training institute of Eastern India; founder of the Media Research Centre (EMRC) of St. Xavier's College, Kolkata (1986); former president of Unda/OCIC-India; and author of over 35 books on cinema, communication, and spirituality. He made India his home and won an Indian National Film Award Special Mention for Best Writing on Cinema for the year 1998. The ceremony took place on 15 February 2000 and the awards were given by then President of India, K. R. Narayanan. Gaston Roberge was a close friend of Satyajit Ray

== Education and early days ==
Roberge was born in Montreal, Quebec. He graduated from the University of Montreal, and did his master's degree at UCLA. He joined the Society of Jesus (Jesuit Fathers) in 1956 and was sent to India on his request. He was the Executive Secretary for Social Communication, Headquarters of the Society of Jesus, Rome, till 1999.

== Books ==
- Chitra Bani
- Mass Communication and Man
- Films for an Ecology of Mind
- The Theory of Indian cinema
- Mediation: The Action of the Media in Our Society
- The Ways of Film Studies: Film Theory & the Interpretation of Films
- Satyajit Ray: Essays 1970–2005
- The Subject of Cinema
- Another cinema for another society
- Communication, Cinema, Development: From Morosity to Hope
- Les aventures de Kat Mandou
- Woman of Light To View Movies the Indian Way
- The Indian Film Theory: Flames of Sholay, Notes and Beyond
- The Compassionate Face of Meaning: Fragments for a Mosaic
- Cyberbani

== Awards and accolades ==
- National Film Award Special Mention for Best Writing on Cinema
- Lifetime Achievement Award by Bimal Roy Memorial & Film Society | "For establishing the unique enabling institution of Chitrabani and thus pioneering film academia in India as well as cultivating and nurturing several generations of cineastes and filmmakers."

== Documentary on Fr. Gaston Roberge ==
- Master Preacher of Film Theory by National Award-winning filmmaker KG Das
