= Muriel Kent Roy =

Canadian demographer (1921–2020)

- Born: Muriel Kent Blanchard; 15 September 1921; Moncton, New Brunswick, Canada
- Died: 2 June 2020 (aged 98); Montreal, Quebec, Canada
- Occupation: Demographer

Muriel Kent Roy (née Blanchard; 15 September 1921 – 2 June 2020) was a Canadian demographer.

== Biography ==
Muriel Kent Blanchard was born on 15 September 1921 in Moncton, New Brunswick. She studied at the Université de Montréal, then at the Sorbonne. She taught sociology and demography at the Université de Moncton and headed the Center d'études acadiennes Anselme-Chiasson.

She played an important role in preserving Acadian heritage and helped with the restoration of the Monument Lefebvre in Memramcook. Roy co-chaired the Special Commission of Inquiry on the Kouchibouguac National Park alongside Gérard La Forest, starting in 1981.

This commission eventually led to the foundation of the Kouchibouguac National Park. She directed several commissions, advisory boards, and professional associations in New Brunswick, Canada, and abroad. She was made a member of the Ordre des francophones d'Amérique in 1989, and the Order of Canada on 27 October 1993.

== Personal life and death ==
The daughter of Alice (née Kent; from England) and Alfred Blanchard, Muriel married Louis-François Roy, who predeceased her. The couple had four children: Leslie, Louise, Michelle, and Maurice (who predeceased his mother).

Muriel Kent Roy died on 2 June 2020 at St. Mary's Hospital (Montreal), aged 98.

== Publications ==
- Démographie et démolinguistique en Acadie, 1871-1991, L'Acadie des Maritimes (1993)
