= Marguerite Lescop =

Canadian writer (1915–2020)

- Born: Marguerite Geoffrion; 8 November 1915; Longueuil, Quebec, Canada
- Died: 3 April 2020 (aged 104); Montreal, Quebec, Canada
- Occupation: Author

Marguerite Lescop (née Marguerite Geoffrion; 8 November 1915 – 3 April 2020) was a Canadian author, editor, and public speaker.

== Biography ==
After the death of her husband, René Lescop, she attended writing workshops and wrote her autobiography, Le Tour de ma vie en 80 ans, published in 1996 by Salon du livre de Montréal. The book obtained considerable success, with more than 100,000 copies sold. She gave numerous conferences at retirement homes across Quebec.

Lescop founded her own publishing company, Éditions Lescop, and published two books with it: En effeuillant la Marguerite (1998) and Les Épîtres de Marguerite (2000). With Éditions Fides, she published Nous, les vieux, a series of interviews with Benoît Lacroix, a good friend of Lescop's. In 2007, she had three books published by Guy Saint-Jean Éditeur.

Marguerite Lescop died on 3 April 2020 at the Institut universitaire de gériatrie de Montréal - Pavillon Alfred-Desrochers in Montreal at the age of 104 due to COVID-19 during the COVID-19 pandemic in Quebec.

== Distinctions ==
- Order of Canada (2001)
