= Bud Fowler (Canadian football) =

Canadian football player (died 2020)

Profile
- Positions: Halfback, End

Personal information
- Born: 1925 or 1926; Toronto, Ontario, Canada
- Died: January 10, 2020 (aged 94); Toronto, Ontario, Canada
- Listed height: 6 ft 0 in (1.83 m)
- Listed weight: 192 lb (87 kg)

Career history
- 1950–1953: Toronto Argonauts

Awards and highlights
- Grey Cup champion (1950) he has worn 3 Grey Cup rings in his career; Played in the Mud Bowl

Charles Percy Fowler (1925 or 1926 – January 10, 2020), known as Bud Fowler, was a Canadian professional football player who played for the Toronto Argonauts. He won the Grey Cup with them in 1950.
