= Ralph Haas =

Canadian engineer and academic (1933–2020)

Ralph Carl George Haas CM FRSC (1933 – 19 June 2020) was a Canadian engineer and academic. He was the Norman W. McLeod Engineering Professor and Distinguished Professor Emeritus in the Department of Civil Engineering at the University of Waterloo in Waterloo, Ontario. He was born in Dixonville, Alberta and was an alumnus of the University of Alberta. He was a member of the Order of Canada as well as the Royal Society of Canada, the Engineering Institute of Canada and the American Society of Civil Engineers.

He died on 19 June 2020, aged 87.
