= Jean-Marie Brochu =

Canadian Roman Catholic priest (1926–2020)

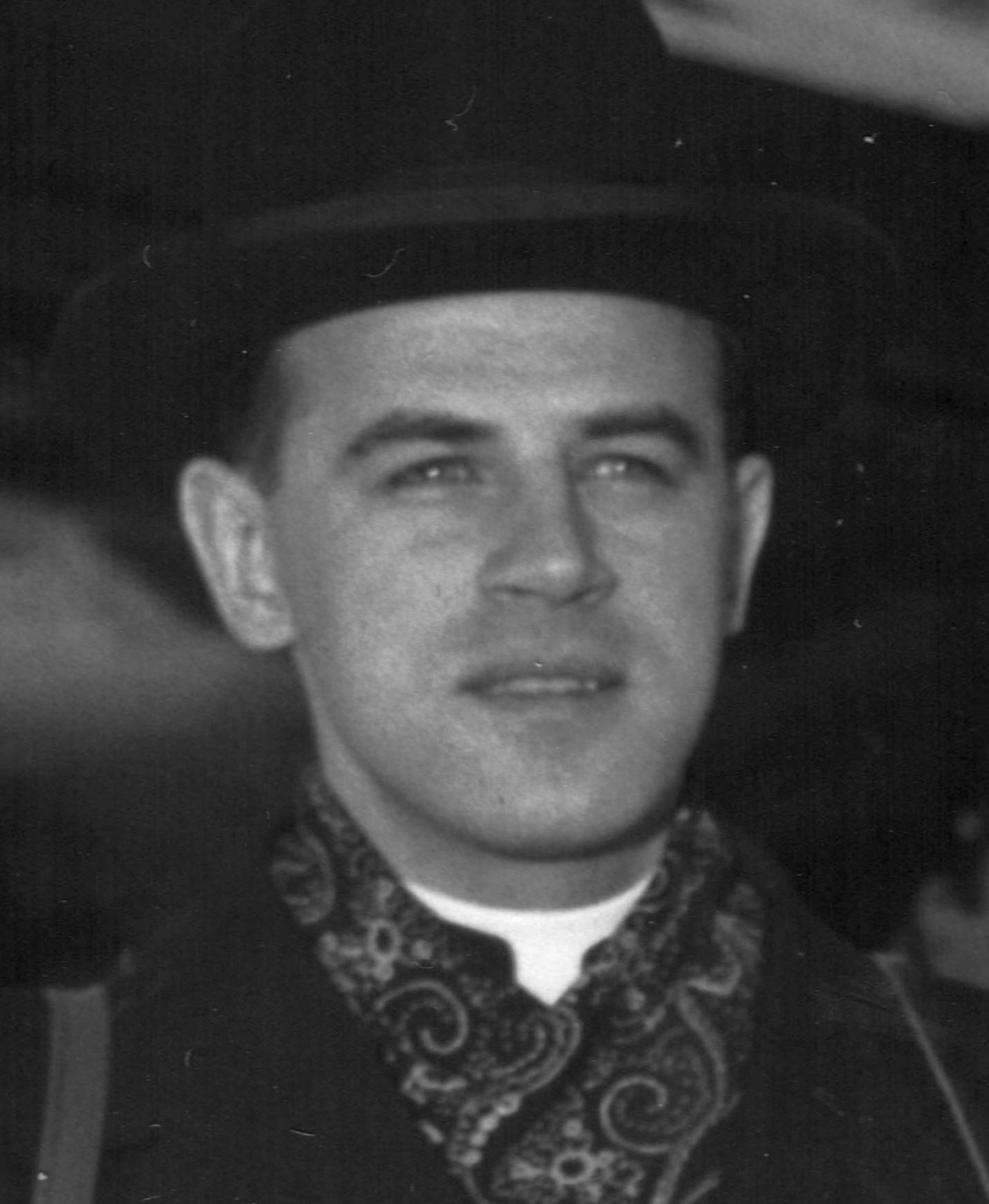
- Born: 1926; Quebec City, Quebec, Canada
- Died: 22 August 2020 (aged 93–94); Saint-Anselme, Quebec, Canada
- Other names: Monsieur le Bonheur
- Occupations: Catholic priest, radio broadcaster
- Years active: 1952–2020
- Known for: Founding Le Noël du Bonheur

Ecclesiastical career
- Religion: Christianity
- Church: Roman Catholic Church
- Ordained: 7 June 1952
- Congregations served: Saint-Charles Garnier Parish, Sillery

Jean-Marie Brochu (1926 – 22 August 2020) was a Canadian Catholic priest in the Archdiocese of Quebec, radio broadcaster, and founder of the charitable organization Le Noël du Bonheur. Known publicly as Monsieur le Bonheur, he broadcast daily inspirational messages on Quebec radio for approximately fifty years and coordinated a volunteer network that provided gifts and visits to thousands of chronically hospitalized patients across the Capitale-Nationale and Chaudière-Appalaches regions.

== Early life and priesthood ==
Brochu was born in 1926 in Quebec City, the eldest of five children of Raoul Brochu and Yvonne Cormier. He studied at the Externat Saint-Jean-Eudes de Québec, the Collège de Sainte-Anne-de-la-Pocatière, and the Grand Séminaire de Québec. He was ordained a priest on 7 June 1952 at the age of 26. Shortly after his ordination, he was appointed secretary and notary at the Chancellery of the Archdiocese of Quebec, serving in that capacity for twenty years under Archbishop Maurice Roy.

In 1972, Brochu became rector of the Saint-Charles Garnier parish in Sillery, a position he held until 1984.

== Radio career ==
Beginning in 1962, Brochu broadcast daily inspirational messages on radio station CJLR, adopting the persona Monsieur le Bonheur ("Mr. Happiness"). His broadcasts later aired on stations CJRP and CHRC. By 2012, marking the fiftieth anniversary of the character, he had delivered more than 13,500 radio messages. He also appeared on television, including a seven-month run on TVA-Télé-4 in Quebec City.

== Le Noël du Bonheur ==
On Christmas Eve 1963, Brochu launched a fundraising appeal on CJLR for patients at the Hôpital Saint-Augustin, founding the charitable organization Le Noël du Bonheur. The organization grew into a network of approximately 2,500 volunteers serving more than 8,000 chronically hospitalized patients across nearly 100 care facilities in the Capitale-Nationale and Chaudière-Appalaches regions. Each patient received three gifts per year — for their birthday, Christmas, and Mother's Day or Father's Day — with the organization distributing between $300,000 and $320,000 annually in gifts and activities.

In 2019, at the age of 93, Brochu stepped down as president of Le Noël du Bonheur and was named honorary president.

== Honours ==
- 1998 – Governor General's Caring Canadian Award
- 2003 – Member of the Order of Canada, invested on 30 October by Adrienne Clarkson
- 2011 – Medal of the National Assembly of Quebec, presented on 29 November by Vanier MNA Patrick Huot

== Death ==
Brochu died on 22 August 2020 at the CHSLD de Saint-Anselme, aged 94.
