= Norm Hill =

Canadian football player (1928–2020)

Profile
- Position: End

Personal information
- Born: November 8, 1928; Winnipeg, Manitoba, Canada
- Died: January 18, 2020 (aged 91); Winnipeg, Manitoba, Canada
- Listed height: 6 ft 2 in (1.88 m)
- Listed weight: 200 lb (91 kg)

Career history
- 1948–1950: Calgary Stampeders
- 1951–1953: Winnipeg Blue Bombers
- 1954: Calgary Stampeders

Awards and highlights
- Grey Cup champion (1948)

Norman Charles Hill, M.D, M.Sc (November 8, 1928 – January 18, 2020) was a Canadian professional football player and neurosurgeon. He played for the Calgary Stampeders and the Winnipeg Blue Bombers. He won the Grey Cup with the Stampeders in 1948. He previously played football at and attended the University of Manitoba (where he would also receive his Medical Degree in 1952.)

In 1958, Hill would do a residency program in neurosurgery at Mayo Clinic, returning to Canada afterwards. During his tenure as the head of Neurosurgery at the Health Sciences Centre and St. Boniface Hospital, he introduced CAT scan machines into his practice, becoming the first to do so in Winnipeg.
