= Len Cunning =

Canadian ice hockey player (1950–2020)

Len Cunning (November 1, 1950 – July 3, 2020) was an ice hockey player who played for the Johnstown Jets of the Eastern Hockey League. His career ended in one game after taking a skate to the face.

== Life facts ==
Len was born November 1, 1950, in Edmonton, Alberta. He was 6.03 feet tall and weighed 195 pounds. In his career, he shot left handed.

== 1970-1971 season ==
(Games Played: 69) (Goals: 3) (Assists: 20) (Points: 23) ( PIM: 78)

Cunning faced John Van Horlick of the Checkers December 8, 1970. It was not proven who won the fight.

== 1971-1972 season ==
(Games Played: 71) (Goals: 6) (Assists: 21) (Points: 27) (PIM: 70)
