= Tim Irwin (sailor) =

Canadian sailor (1940–2020)

Tim Irwin (19 February 1940 – 7 August 2020) was a Canadian sailor who competed in the 1968 Summer Olympics. The team of Steve Tupper, Dave Millar and Tim Irwin finished 4th sailing in the Dragon Class in the waters off Alcapulco.

Irwin lived in Kingston Ontario where he volunteered at CORK. (Canadian Olympic-Training Regatta Kingston) for most of its 50 years.

He died of cancer on 7 August 2020 at the age of 80.
