= Rae Johnson =

Canadian painter (1953–2020)

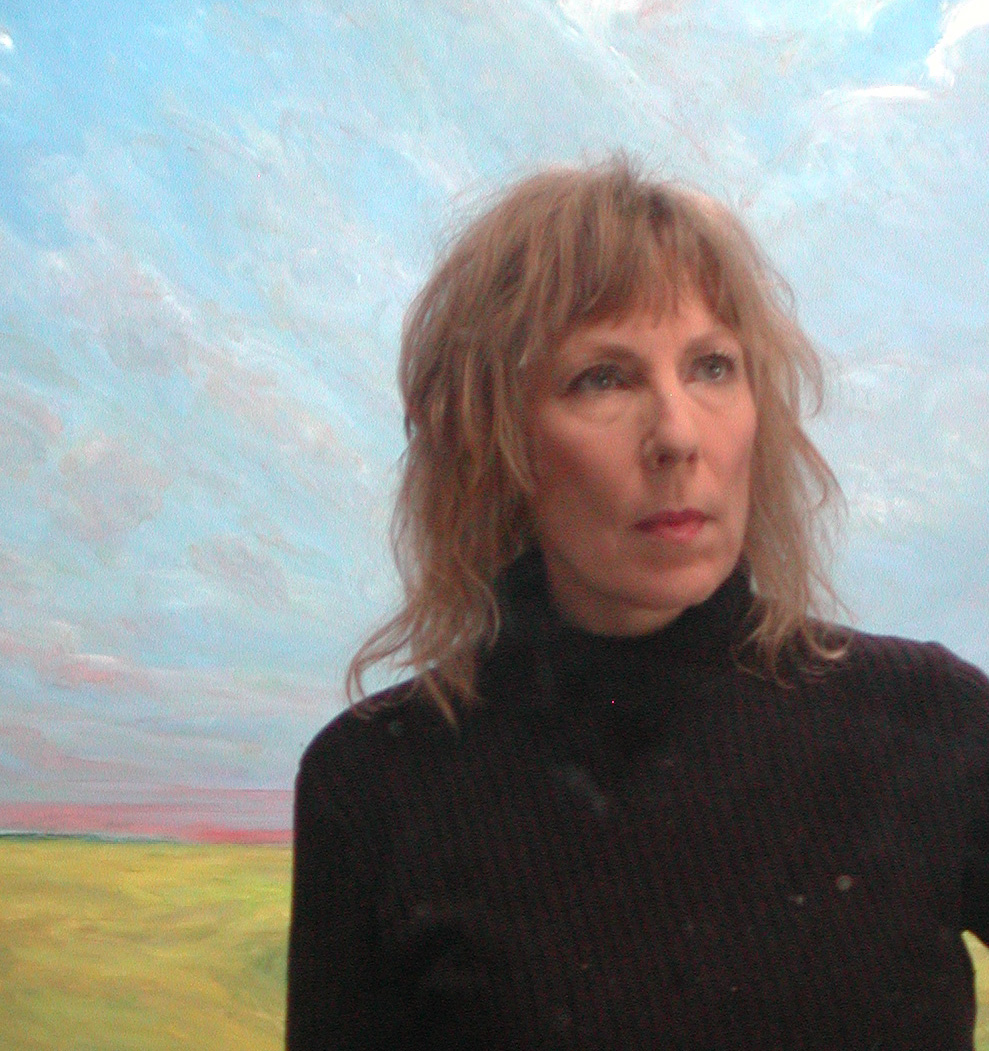
- Johnson at her studio in 2018
- Born: March 28, 1953; Winnipeg, Manitoba, Canada
- Died: May 18, 2020 (aged 67); Toronto, Ontario, Canada
- Education: Ontario College of Art (1980)
- Known for: Cofounder, ChromaZone Gallery, Toronto 1980s
- Movement: Figurative Painting Movement, Toronto 1980s
- Website: OCAD profile

Rae Johnson (March 28, 1953 – May 18, 2020) was a Canadian painter based in Toronto.

== Early life ==
Originally from Winnipeg, Manitoba, Johnson studied at the New School of Art in Toronto from 1975 to 1976 and at the Ontario College of Art from 1977 to 1980. In 1981 she became a founding member of the ChromaZone/ Chromatique Collective gallery, dedicated to reintroducing figurative painting to Toronto. In 1987 she moved to Flesherton in northern Ontario; the landscapes which she since produced are reminiscent of the work of the Tom Thomson and the Group of Seven, whose work she had seen at the National Gallery of Canada when she was still a student.

== Artwork ==
Primarily a painter, Johnson's work dealt with dreams and imagination, providing enough detail to recognize figures and spaces but "encourages us to contemplate endings, meanings and loss." Themes in her artwork ranged from Madonna figures to sexuality, pornography, archetypes and Jungian psychology. With a feminist outlook, and using domestic interiors and natural landscapes as starting points for her paintings, her works have been noted for their diary-like quality, being "like notations in a journal," of simple memories. She painted guardian angels and claimed her favorite angel was Archangel Michael. With her spirituality at the core of her artworks, in her own words, she said:

"I want my paintings to offer a space for the imagination and an affirmation of inner life."

In 2020, the Art Gallery of Ontario acquired Johnson's monumental painting Night Games at the Paradise, 1984.

== Exhibitions ==
Johnson showed extensively throughout Toronto and Canada, including yearly solo exhibitions at the Carmen Lamanna Gallery from 1983 to 1991. She was represented by Christopher Cutts Gallery in Toronto, which is where she held her last exhibition before her death, entitled Angels and Monsters.

== Curating work ==
From 2009 to 2011 she acted as guest curator for the Museum of Contemporary Canadian Art, and National Gallery @ MOCCA, providing research for the 2011 historical exhibition, "This is Paradise," where Johnson said:

“This exhibition is a celebration of this era, marked by triumph and tragedy, and the reclamation of an important part of Toronto history. Works for this multidisciplinary exhibition have been borrowed from collections across Canada, to once again return to their origins, on Queen Street West.”

In 2012, she curated and organized an exhibition of 32 artists from Canada titled TORONTO/BERLIN 1982–2012, hosted by the Zweigstelle Berlin Gallery in Berlin. In 2017, she was selected to be the visual editor of the Theatre Passe Muraille 50th anniversary book, and was recently included in A Concise History of Canadian Painting third edition. She was included in Intervention: 31 Women Painters exhibition in Montreal, curated by Harold Klunder.

== Teaching ==
Johnson was a professor at OCADU since 1987, and lectured at various institutions, including the Zweigstelle Berlin Gallery, the University of Toronto, York University (Toronto), the Banff Center, University of Guelph, Ontario, and the Toronto School of Art, among others.

== Death ==
Rae Johnson lived in Toronto until her death on May 18, 2020.
