= Alfred John Ellis =

Canadian banker (1915–2020)

A. John Ellis
- Born: May 27, 1915; Montreal, Quebec, Canada
- Died: January 29, 2020 (aged 104); Vancouver, British Columbia, Canada
- Occupations: Banker and corporate director
- Awards: Order of Canada

Alfred John Ellis, OC (May 27, 1915 – January 29, 2020) was a Canadian banker. Born in Montreal, Quebec, Canada, he graduated Lower Canada College in 1932. He was a vice-chairman and director of the Bank of Montreal. He was made an Officer of the Order of Canada in 1983. In 2012, he was awarded the Queen Elizabeth II Diamond Jubilee Medal. He received Japan's Order of the Rising Sun in 1989. He turned 100 in 2015 and died in 2020 at the age of 104 in Vancouver.
