= Arun (given name) =

- Gender: Male

Origin
- Language: Sanskrit
- Derivation: अरुण
- Meaning: "reddish brown" or "dawn"
- Region of origin: India

Other names
- Related names: Aruna (given name)

Arun is an Indian male given name meaning dawn in Sanskrit. The name derives from Aruna, the aspect of dawn and charioteer of Surya.

The following is a list of notable people with "Arun" as their first, middle or last name.

== Academia, art & literature ==
- Arun Agrawal (born 1962), a political scientist in the School of Natural Resources & Environment at the University of Michigan.
- Arun G. Phadke, Distinguished Professor emeritus in the Department of Electrical Engineering at Virginia Tech.
- Arun Joshi (1939–1993), an Indian writer.
- Arun K. Pati, an Indian physicist notable for his research in quantum information and computation.
- Arun Kolatkar (1932–2004), Indian poet.
- Arun Krushnaji Kamble (1953–2009), a Marathi writer and Dalit activist.
- Arun Kumar Basak, a Bangladeshi physicist and Professor Emeritus in the Department of Physics, University of Rajshahi.
- Arun Majumdar, a materials scientist, engineer and University of California, Berkeley graduate who was President Obama's nominee for Under Secretary of Energy.
- Arun Midha (born 1964), a British academic.
- Arun Mitra (1909–2000), a Bengali poet.
- Arun Netravali (1945–2021), Indian–American computer scientist.
- Arun Nigavekar, an educationist and ex Chairperson & Vice-Chairperson of UGC.
- Arun Prasad, a historian specialized in the History of Bangalore.
- Arun Rai, an Indian born American scientist.
- Arun Sarma (1931–2017), a contemporary writer of Assam.
- Arun Sundararajan, is the NEC Faculty Fellow, Professor of Information, Operations & Management Sciences and Doctoral Coordinator at the Stern School of Business, NYU.
- Arun Schaechter Viswanath, translator into Yiddish of novels about Harry Potter and Pippi Longstocking.
- Madhuvanti Arun, an Indian educational promoter.
- Vinod Bala Arun, a Hindi, Sanskrit and Indian Philosophy scholar.

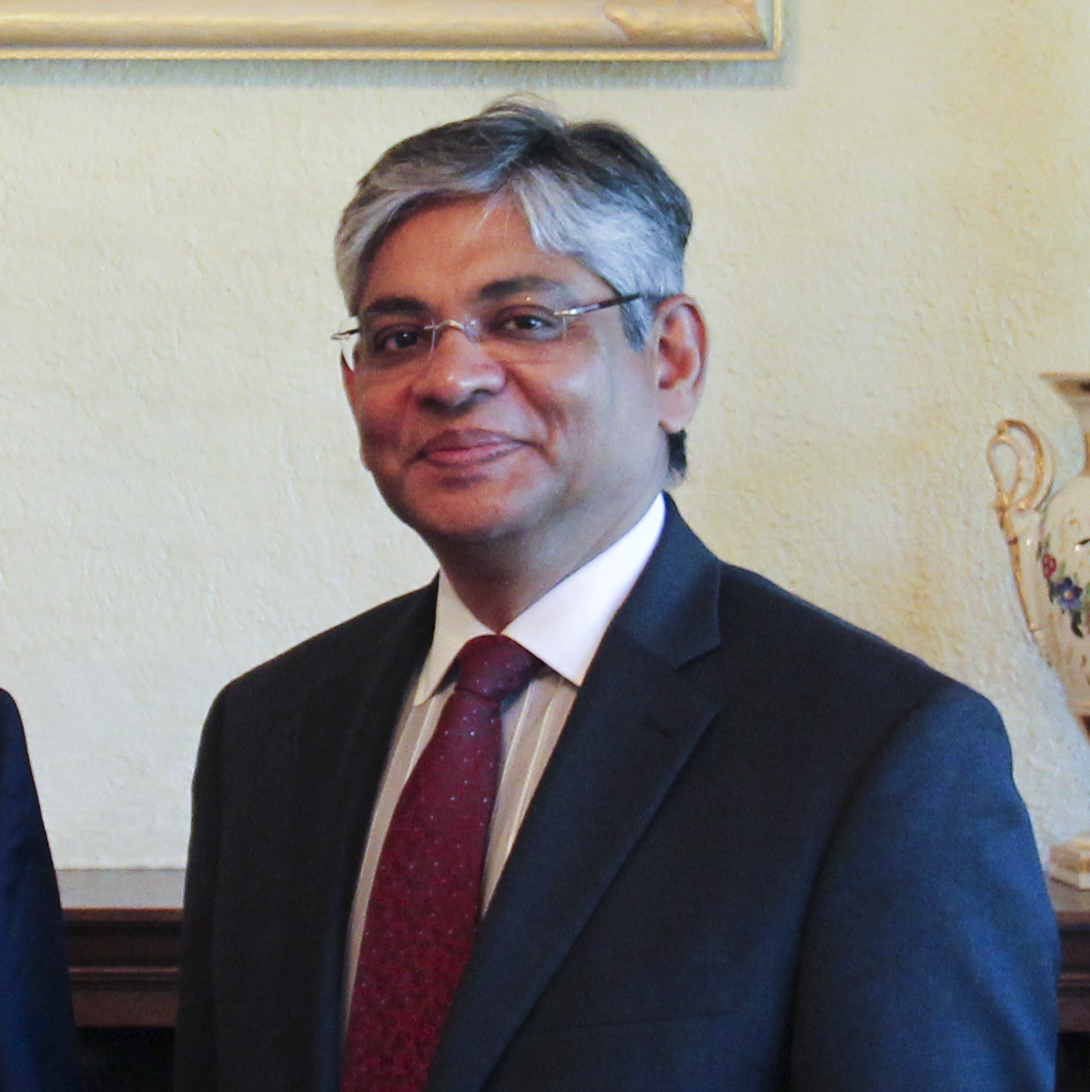
Arun Kumar Singh

== Bureaucracy and administration ==
- Arun Jaitley, Union Finance Minister of India.
- Arun Bhatnagar (born 1944), former Indian Administrative Service officer.
- Arun Kumar Gupta, an Indian police officer.
- Arun Kumar Mishra (born 1955), a judge of the Supreme Court of India.
- Arun Kumar Purwar, Chairman of State Bank of India.
- Arun Kumar Singh, an Indian diplomat and Indian Ambassador to the United States.

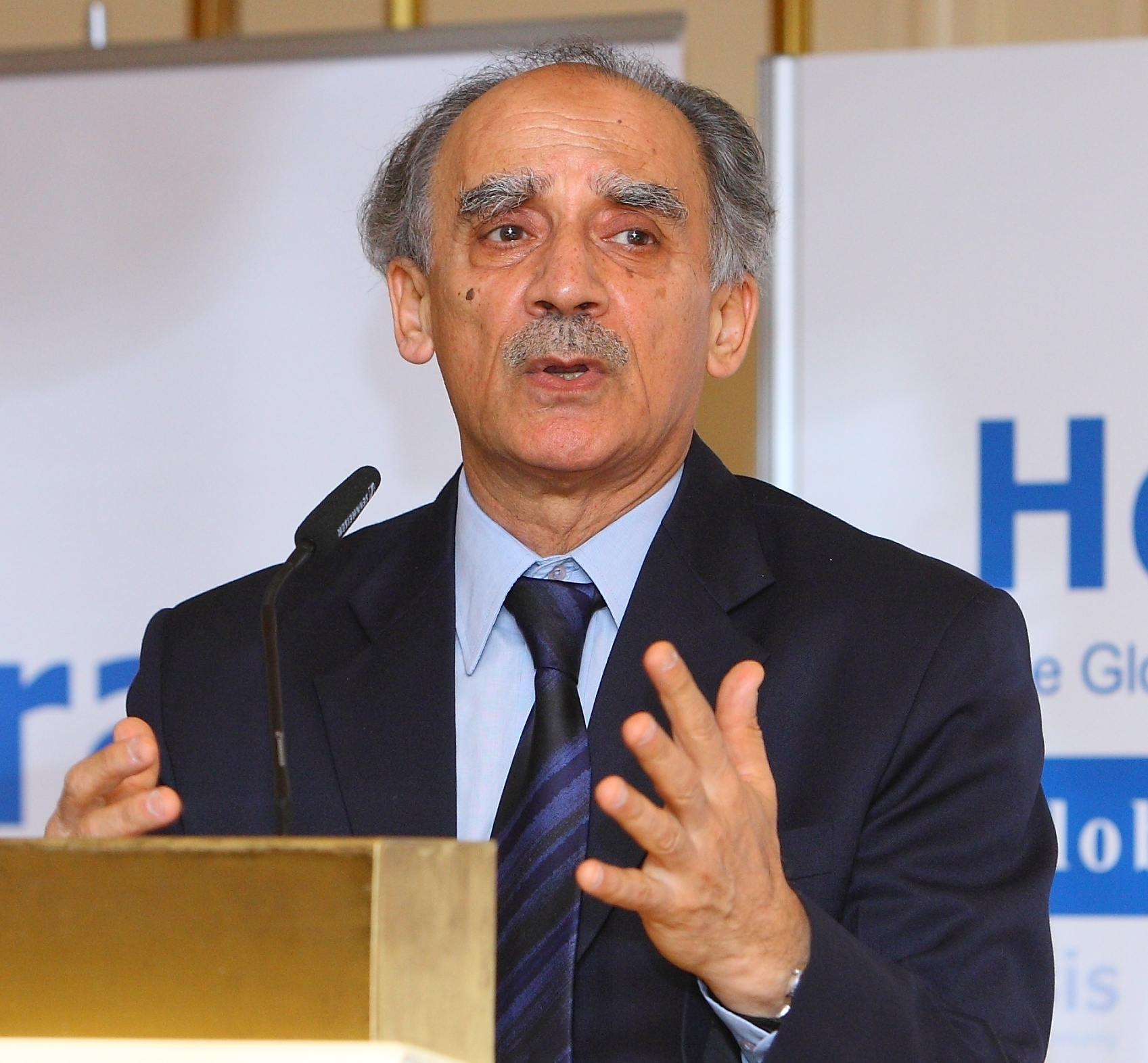
Arun Shourie

== Business ==
- Arun Firodia, an Indian businessman and chairman of Kinetic Group.
- Arun Katiyar, a media expert from India.
- Arun Nayar, an Indian businessman and ex-husband of Elizabeth Hurley.
- Arun Pudur, an Indian businessman, entrepreneur and investor.
- Arun Purie, an Indian businessman who is the founder-publisher and editor-in-chief of India Today.
- Arun Raha (born 1959), Executive Director and Chief Economist for the State of Washington.
- Arun Sarin (born 1954), an Indian-born American telecommunications executive.
- Arun Shourie (born 1941), an Indian journalist, author and politician.

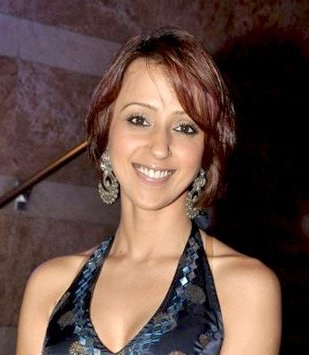
Ishitta Arun

== Film, Television & Media ==
- Adith Arun, an Indian film actor who has appeared in Tamil and Telugu language films.
- Arun Alat, an Indian playback singer and musician.
- Arun Bakshi, an Indian film and television actor and singer.
- Arun Bali (1942–2022), an Indian actor.
- Arun Bannerjee, an Indian Bengali film actor.
- Arun Bhatt, an Indian former film director (of Hindi and Gujarati cinema).
- Arun Chaudhary, first official videographer of the White House.
- Arun Cherukavil, an Indian Malayalam film Actor.
- Arun Date (1934–2018), a Marathi singer of Bhavageete.
- Arun Govil (born 1958), an Indian actor, producer and director.
- Arun Kashalkar, an Indian classical vocalist of the Agra-Gwalior Gharana.
- Arun Kaul (1933–2007), a noted Kashmiri film maker and screenwriter.
- Arun Kumar Ahuja (1917–1998), an Indian actor and producer.
- Arun Kumar Aravind (born 1977), Indian film director, editor and producer.
- Arun Maini (born 1995), British YouTuber known as Mrwhosetheboss.
- Arun Mukherjee (bn), Bengali playwright and actor.
- Arun Muraleedharan, an Indian music composer.
- Arun Nalawade, an Indian film and theater personality.
- Arun Pandyan, an Indian actor, director, producer and politician.
- Arun Paudwal (died 1991), music composer in Bollywood in India.
- Arun Rath, a prominent radio producer and broadcast journalist.
- Arun Sagar (born 1980), Indian film actor, art director and comedian.
- Arun Saha (actor) (born 1983), a Bangladeshi actor and musician.
- Arun Sarnaik (1935–1984), an actor and singer from Kolhapur, Maharashtra, India.
- Arun Shenoy (born 1978), a composer and music producer of Indian origin, based in Singapore.
- Arun Thapa (1952–1999), Nepali singer and songwriter.
- Arun Vaidyanathan, an Indian-American film director, producer and screenwriter.
- Arun Vijay (born 1974), an Indian actor, playback singer & stunt coordinator.
- Ila Arun, Indian actress, TV personality and singer.
- M. D. Pallavi Arun, a singer from Karnataka, India.
- P. A. Arun Prasad (born 1967), an Indian film director, screenwriter and producer.
- Priya Arun, an actress in the Marathi language film industry.

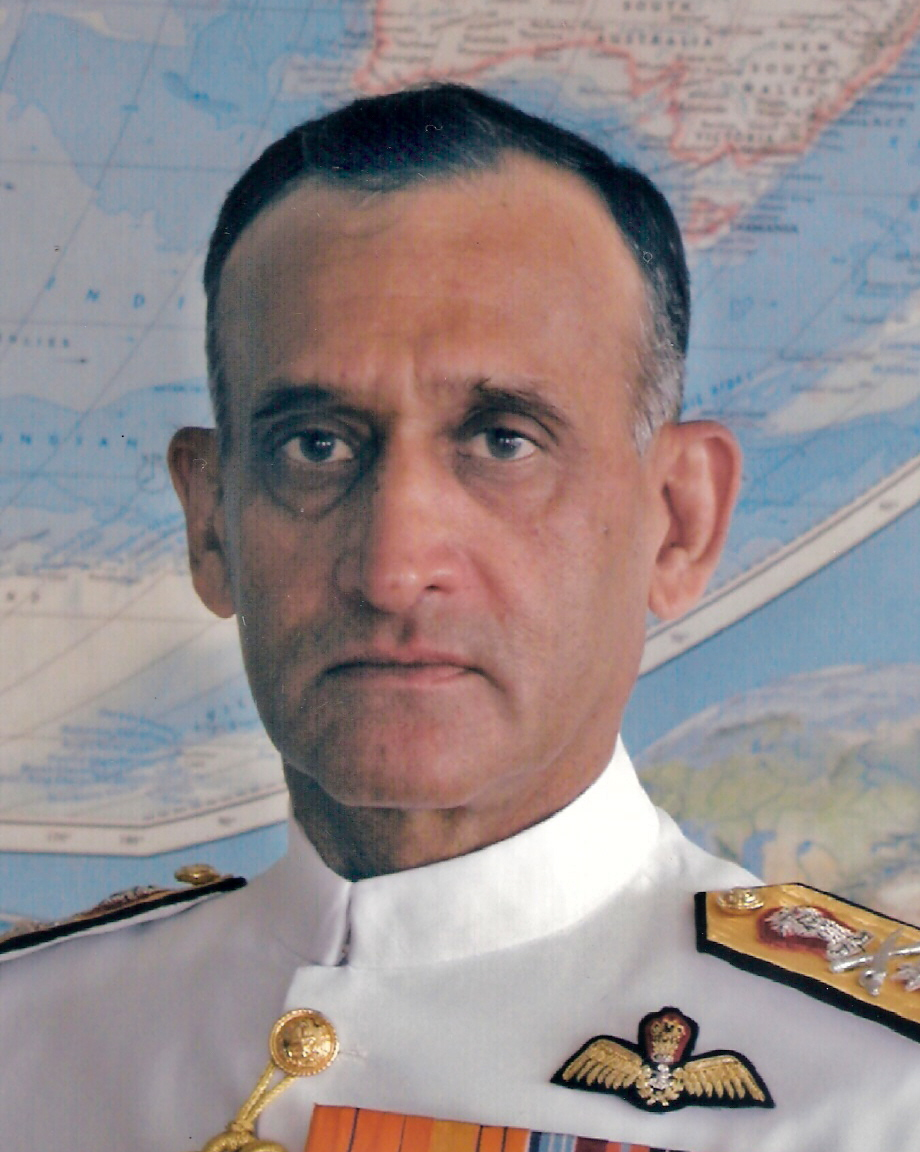
Admiral Arun Prakash

== Indian Armed Forces ==
- Arun Khetarpal (1950–1971), an officer of the Indian Army and a posthumous recipient of the Param Vir Chakra.
- Arun Prakash (born 1944), a retired Four-Star Admiral who served as the Chief of the Naval Staff of the Indian Navy.
- Arun Shridhar Vaidya (1926–1986), 13th Chief of Army Staff (CoAS) of the Indian Army.

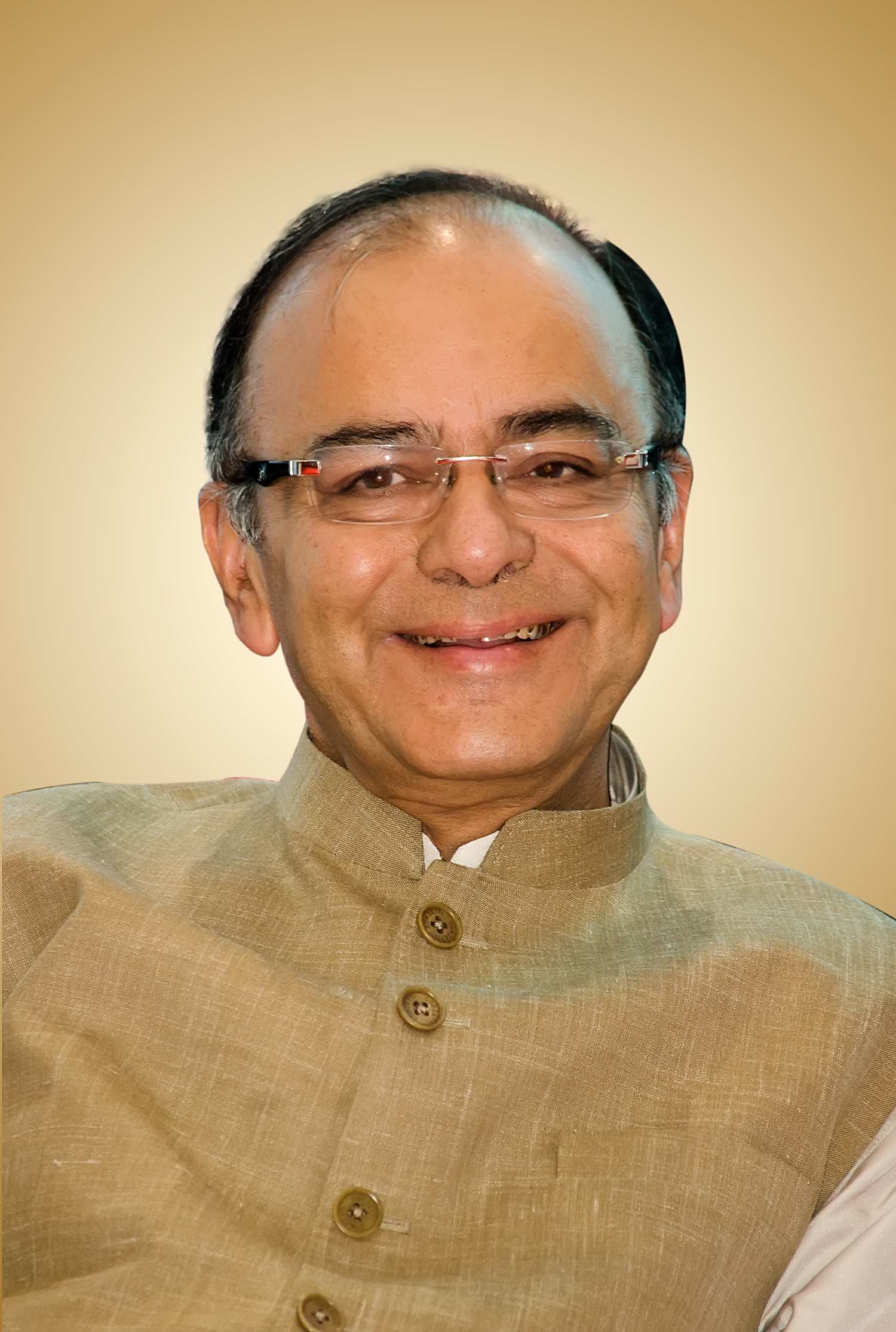
Arun Jaitley

== Politics ==
- Arun Chandra Guha (1892–?), an Indian politician.
- Arun Jaitley (1952–2019), a Bharatiya Janata Party politician. Minister for Finance, Corporate Affairs, Information, and Broadcasting, in the Government of India.
- Arun Kumar Sarmah (born 1956), an Indian politician and member of the 14th Lok Sabha.
- Arun Kumar (Uttar Pradesh politician) (born 1948), an Indian politician from Bareilly district.
- Arun Kumar (Bihar politician) (born 1959), an Indian politician from Bihar.
- Arun Nehru (1944–2013), an Indian politician.
- Arun Pathak (Bihar politician), an Indian politician.
- Arun Pathak (Uttar Pradesh politician), an Indian politician.
- Arun Pathak (born 1975), an Indian politician.
- Arun Sao (born 1968), Indian politician from Chhattisgarh.
- Arun Singh (born 1944), Indian politician and former union minister of state for defence in the Government of India.
- Arun Singh (born 1965), Indian politician from Uttar Pradesh.
- Arun Subhashchandra Yadav (born 1974), member of 14th and 15th Lok Sabhas of India.
- Arun Verma (born 1986), an Indian politician.
- M. Arun Subramanian, Indian politician. Member of the Tamil Nadu Legislative Assembly from the Tiruttani constituency.
- Sangram Arun Jagtap, Indian politician and member of the 13th Maharashtra Legislative Assembly.
- Undavalli Aruna Kumar (born 1954), an Indian politician.

=== Convicted politician ===
- Arun Gawli (born 1955), a gangster-turned-politician in Mumbai, India.

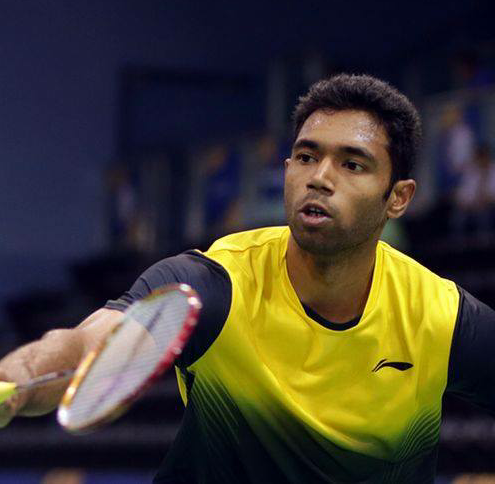
Arun Vishnu

== Sports ==
- Arun Bhardwaj, an ultramarathon runner from New Delhi, India.
- Arun Harinath (born 1987), an English cricketer.
- Arun Karthik (born 1986), an Indian cricketer.
- Arun Khurana, an Indian former cricketer.
- Arun Lal (cricketer, born 1985), a Pakistani first-class cricketer who plays for Quetta cricket team.
- Arun Lal (born 1955), an Indian cricketer, and a cricket commentator.
- Arun Murugesan, an Indian Weightlifter.
- Arun Muthukrishnan, an Indian motorcycle racer.
- Arun Panchia, a New Zealand field hockey player.
- Arun Poulose, an Indian cricketer.
- Arun Sharma, an Indian first-class cricketer.
- Arun Singh (cricketer), an Indian former cricketer.
- Arun Singla, an Indian cricketer.
- Arun Vishnu (born 1988), an Indian badminton player.
- Bharat Arun, an Indian Test cricketer.
- Subramanian Arun Prasad (born 1988), an Indian Chess Grandmaster.

== Others ==
- Arun Arora (born 1971), British Anglican priest and former Director of Communications of the Church of England
- Arun Barun O Kiranmala, a Bengali Fantasy film.
- Arun Garg (born 1946), an Indo-Canadian physician in British Columbia who is recognized for contributing linkages between Canada and India.
- Arun Krishnamurthy (born 1986), an Indian environmental activist who initiated campaign cleaning various lakes across India.
- Arun Kumar Chanda (1899–1947), an Indian independence activist from Cachar district of Assam.
- Arun Luthra, a jazz musician (saxophonist, konnakol artist, composer and arranger) based in New York City.
- Arun Maira (born 1943), a management consultant and former member of Planning Commission of India.
- Arun Manilal Gandhi, an Indian-American socio-political activist, and the fifth grandson of Gandhi.
- Arun Netravali (born 1946), an Indian-American computer engineer credited with major contributions in digital technology including HDTV.
- Arun Sadhu (1941–2017), a writer and a freelance journalist from Maharashtra, India.
- Tushar Arun Gandhi, son of journalist Arun Manilal Gandhi, grandson of Manilal Gandhi and great-grandson of Mahatma Gandhi.

== See also ==
- Arun (disambiguation)
- Aaron
- Kumar
