= Arunkumar =

Arunkumar is a given name and surname. Notable people with the name include:

== Given name ==
- Arunkumar Guththur, Indian politician
- Arunkumar Mehta (born 1940), Indian businessman
- Arunkumar Vaidya (born 1926) General in the Indian Army

== Surname ==
- B. Arunkumar, Indian politician
- G. Arunkumar, Indian politician
- J. Arunkumar (born 1975), Indian cricketer

== Others ==
- Arun Vijay (born 1977), Indian actor sometimes credited as Arunkumar

== See also ==
- Arun (given name)
