= 1959 in the United States =

- Decades: 1930s; 1940s; 1950s; 1960s; 1970s
- See also: History of the United States (1945–1964); Timeline of United States history (1950–1969); List of years in the United States

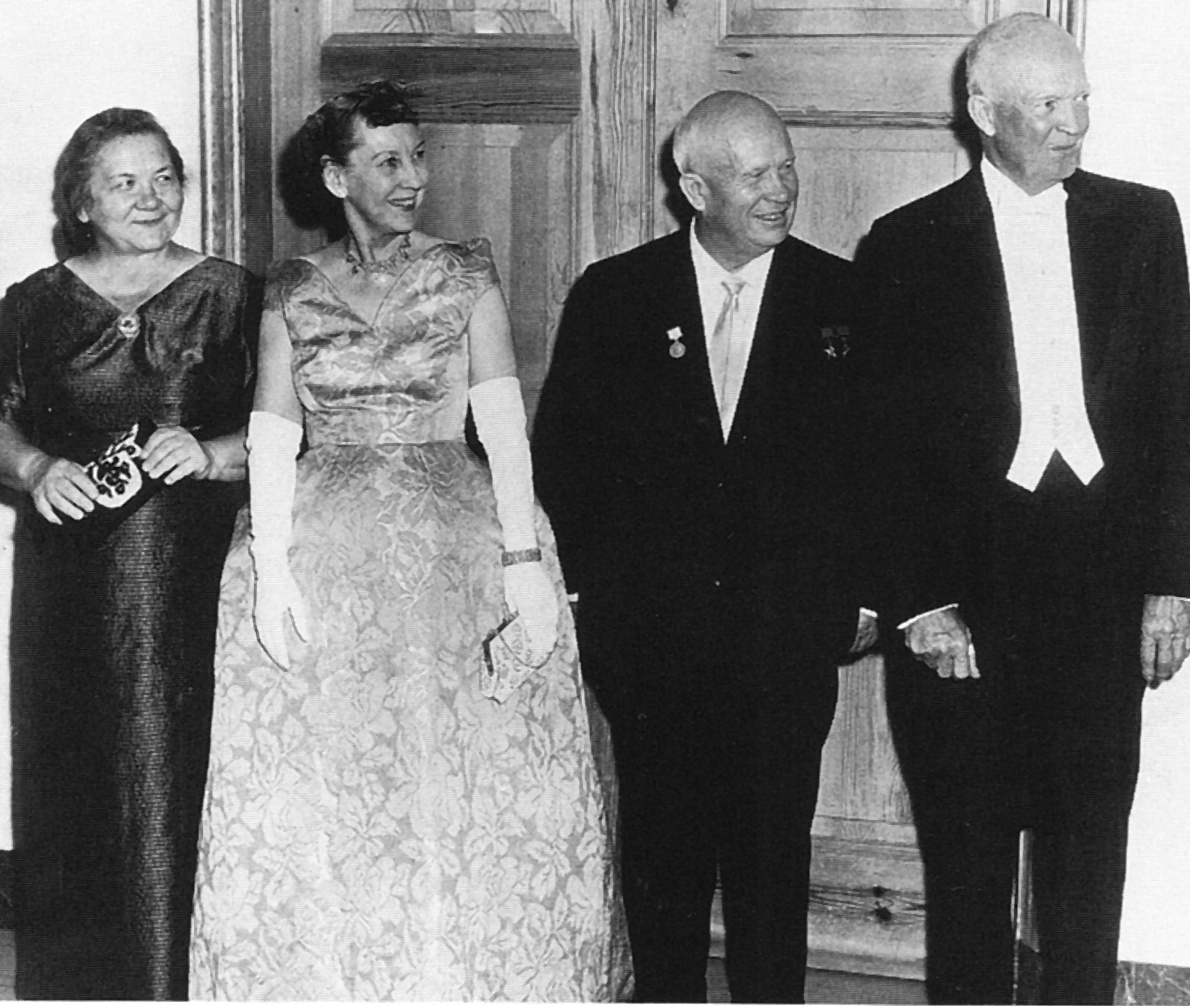
Dwight Eisenhower, Nikita Khrushchev and their wives at a state dinner, 1959.

Events from the year 1959 in the United States. With the admittance of Alaska and Hawaii, this is the last year in which states are added to the union.

== Incumbents ==
=== Federal government ===
- President: Dwight D. Eisenhower (R-Kansas/Pennsylvania)
- Vice President: Richard Nixon (R-California)
- Chief Justice: Earl Warren (California)
- Speaker of the House of Representatives: Sam Rayburn (D-Texas)
- Senate Majority Leader: Lyndon B. Johnson (D-Texas)
- Congress: 85th (until January 3), 86th (starting January 3)

==== State governments ====
Governors and lieutenant governors

=== Governors ===
- Governor of Alabama: Jim Folsom (Democratic) (until January 19), John M. Patterson (Democratic) (starting January 19)
- Governor of Alaska: Waino Edward Hendrickson (Republican) (until January 3), William A. Egan (Democratic) (starting January 3)
- Governor of Arizona: Ernest McFarland (Democratic) (until January 5), Paul Fannin (Republican) (starting January 5)
- Governor of Arkansas: Orval Faubus (Democratic)
- Governor of California: Goodwin Knight (Republican) (until January 5), Pat Brown (Democratic) (starting January 5)
- Governor of Colorado: Stephen L. R. McNichols (Democratic)
- Governor of Connecticut: Abraham A. Ribicoff (Democratic)
- Governor of Delaware: J. Caleb Boggs (Republican)
- Governor of Florida: LeRoy Collins (Democratic)
- Governor of Georgia: Marvin Griffin (Democratic) (until January 13), Ernest Vandiver (Democratic) (starting January 13)
- Governor of Hawaii: William F. Quinn (Republican) (starting August 21)
- Governor of Idaho: Robert E. Smylie (Republican)
- Governor of Illinois: William G. Stratton (Republican)
- Governor of Indiana: Harold W. Handley (Republican)
- Governor of Iowa: Herschel C. Loveless (Democratic)
- Governor of Kansas: George Docking (Democratic)
- Governor of Kentucky: Happy Chandler (Democratic) (until December 8), Bert T. Combs (Democratic) (starting December 8)
- Governor of Louisiana: Earl K. Long (Democratic)
- Governor of Maine:
  - until January 2: Edmund Muskie (Democratic)
  - January 2-7: Robert Haskell (Republican)
  - January 7-December 30: Clinton Clauson (Democratic)
  - starting December 30: John H. Reed (Republican)
- Governor of Maryland: Theodore R. McKeldin (Republican) (until January 14), J. Millard Tawes (Democratic) (starting January 14)
- Governor of Massachusetts: Foster Furcolo (Democratic)
- Governor of Michigan: G. Mennen Williams (Democratic)
- Governor of Minnesota: Orville L. Freeman (Democratic)
- Governor of Mississippi: James P. Coleman (Democratic)
- Governor of Missouri: James T. Blair, Jr. (Democratic)
- Governor of Montana: J. Hugo Aronson (Republican)
- Governor of Nebraska: Victor Anderson (Republican) (until January 8), Ralph G. Brooks (Democratic) (starting January 8)
- Governor of Nevada: Charles H. Russell (Republican) (until January 5), Grant Sawyer (Democratic) (starting January 5)
- Governor of New Hampshire: Lane Dwinell (Republican) (until January 1), Wesley Powell (Republican) (starting January 1)
- Governor of New Jersey: Robert B. Meyner (Democratic)
- Governor of New Mexico: Edwin L. Mechem (Republican) (until January 1), John Burroughs (Democratic) (starting January 1)
- Governor of New York: Nelson Rockefeller (Republican) (starting January 1)
- Governor of North Carolina: Luther H. Hodges (Democratic)
- Governor of North Dakota: John E. Davis (Republican)
- Governor of Ohio: C. William O'Neill (Republican) (until January 12), Michael DiSalle (Democratic) (starting January 12)
- Governor of Oklahoma: Raymond D. Gary (Democratic) (until January 12), J. Howard Edmondson (Democratic) (starting January 12)
- Governor of Oregon: Robert D. Holmes (Democratic) (until January 12), Mark Hatfield (Republican) (starting January 12)
- Governor of Pennsylvania: George M. Leader (Democratic) (until January 20), David L. Lawrence (Democratic) (starting January 20)
- Governor of Rhode Island: Dennis J. Roberts (Democratic) (until January 6), Christopher Del Sesto (Republican) (starting January 6)
- Governor of South Carolina: George Bell Timmerman, Jr. (Democratic) (until January 20), Ernest Hollings (Democratic) (starting January 20)
- Governor of South Dakota: Joe Foss (Republican) (until January 6), Ralph Herseth (Democratic) (starting January 6)
- Governor of Tennessee: Frank G. Clement (Democratic) (until January 19), Buford Ellington (Democratic) (starting January 19)
- Governor of Texas: Price Daniel (Democratic)
- Governor of Utah: George Dewey Clyde (Republican)
- Governor of Vermont: Joseph B. Johnson (Republican) (until January 8), Robert T. Stafford (Republican) (starting January 8)
- Governor of Virginia: J. Lindsay Almond (Democratic)
- Governor of Washington: Albert D. Rosellini (Democratic)
- Governor of West Virginia: Cecil H. Underwood (Republican)
- Governor of Wisconsin: Vernon W. Thomson (Republican) (until January 5), Gaylord A. Nelson (Democratic) (starting January 5)
- Governor of Wyoming: Milward L. Simpson (Republican) (until January 5), John J. Hickey (Democratic) (starting January 5)

=== Lieutenant governors ===
- Lieutenant Governor of Alabama: William G. Hardwick (Democratic) (until month and day unknown), Albert B. Boutwell (Democratic) (starting month and day unknown)
- Lieutenant Governor of Alaska: Hugh Wade (Democratic) (starting month and day unknown)
- Lieutenant Governor of Arkansas: Nathan Green Gordon (Democratic)
- Lieutenant Governor of California: Harold J. Powers (Republican) (until January 5), Glenn Malcolm Anderson (Democratic) (starting January 5)
- Lieutenant Governor of Colorado: Frank L. Hays (Republican) (until month and day unknown), Robert Lee Knous (Democratic) (starting month and day unknown)
- Lieutenant Governor of Connecticut: Charles W. Jewett (Democratic) (until month and day unknown), John N. Dempsey (Democratic) (starting month and day unknown)
- Lieutenant Governor of Delaware: David P. Buckson (Republican)
- Lieutenant Governor of Georgia: S. Ernest Vandiver (Democratic) (until January 13), Garland T. Byrd (Democratic) (starting January 13)
- Lieutenant Governor of Hawaii: James Kealoha (Republican) (starting August 21)
- Lieutenant Governor of Idaho: J. Berkeley Larsen (Republican) (until January 5), William Drevlow (Democratic) (starting January 5)
- Lieutenant Governor of Illinois: John William Chapman (Republican)
- Lieutenant Governor of Indiana: Crawford F. Parker (Republican)
- Lieutenant Governor of Iowa: William H. Nicholas (Republican) (until month and day unknown), Edward J. McManus (Democratic) (starting month and day unknown)
- Lieutenant Governor of Kansas: Joseph W. Henkle Sr. (Democratic)
- Lieutenant Governor of Kentucky: Harry Lee Waterfield (Democratic) (until month and day unknown), Wilson W. Wyatt (political party unknown) (starting month and day unknown)
- Lieutenant Governor of Louisiana: Lether Frazar (Democratic)
- Lieutenant Governor of Massachusetts: Robert F. Murphy (Democratic)
- Lieutenant Governor of Michigan: Philip A. Hart (Democratic) (until January 1), John B. Swainson (Democratic) (starting January 1)
- Lieutenant Governor of Minnesota: Karl Rolvaag (Democratic)
- Lieutenant Governor of Mississippi: Carroll Gartin (Democratic)
- Lieutenant Governor of Missouri: Edward V. Long (Democratic)
- Lieutenant Governor of Montana: Paul Cannon (Democratic)
- Lieutenant Governor of Nebraska: Dwight Burney (Republican)
- Lieutenant Governor of Nevada: Rex Bell (Republican)
- Lieutenant Governor of New Mexico: vacant (until January 1), Ed V. Mead (Democratic) (starting January 1)
- Lieutenant Governor of New York: Malcolm Wilson (Republican) (starting January 1)
- Lieutenant Governor of North Carolina: Luther E. Barnhardt (Democratic)
- Lieutenant Governor of North Dakota: Francis Clyde Duffy (Republican) (until month and day unknown), Clarence P. Dahl (Republican) (starting month and day unknown)
- Lieutenant Governor of Ohio: Paul M. Herbert (Republican) (until January 12), John W. Donahey (Democratic) (starting January 12)
- Lieutenant Governor of Oklahoma: Cowboy Pink Williams (Democratic) (until January 12), George Nigh (Democratic) (starting January 12)
- Lieutenant Governor of Pennsylvania: Roy E. Furman (Democratic) (until January 20), John Morgan Davis (Democratic) (starting January 20)
- Lieutenant Governor of Rhode Island: Armand H. Cote (Democratic) (until January 6), John A. Notte, Jr. (Democratic) (starting January 6)
- Lieutenant Governor of South Carolina: Ernest Hollings (Democratic) (until January 20), Burnet R. Maybank, Jr. (Democratic) (starting January 20)
- Lieutenant Governor of South Dakota: L. Roy Houck (Republican) (until January 6), John F. Lindley (Democratic) (starting January 6)
- Lieutenant Governor of Tennessee: Jared Maddux (Democratic) (until January 19), William D. Baird (Democratic) (starting January 19)
- Lieutenant Governor of Texas: Ben Ramsey (Democratic)
- Lieutenant Governor of Vermont: Robert T. Stafford (Republican) (until January 8), Robert S. Babcock (Republican) (starting January 8)
- Lieutenant Governor of Virginia: Allie Edward Stokes Stephens (Democratic)
- Lieutenant Governor of Washington: John Cherberg (Democratic)
- Lieutenant Governor of Wisconsin: Warren P. Knowles (Republican) (until January 5), Philleo Nash (Democratic) (starting January 5)

== Events ==
=== January–March ===
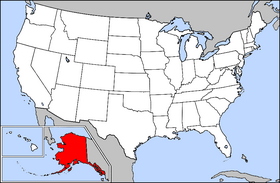
January 3: Alaska admitted as 49th state

- January 2 — CBS Radio ends four soap operas: Backstage Wife, Our Gal Sunday, The Road of Life and This is Nora Drake.
- January 3 — Alaska is admitted as the 49th U.S. state (see History of Alaska).
- January 7 — The United States recognizes the new Cuban government of Fidel Castro.
- January 12 – The Motown record label is founded as Tamla by Berry Gordy in Detroit.
- January 22 — Knox Mine Disaster: Water breaches the River Slope Mine near Pittston City in Port Griffith, Pennsylvania; 12 miners are killed.
- January 29 — Walt Disney releases his 16th animated film, Sleeping Beauty, in Beverly Hills. It is the final fairy tale adaptation released by Disney during his lifetime and the last the studio will produce until 1989's The Little Mermaid; also Disney's first animated film to be shown in 70mm and modern 6-track stereophonic sound. Also on the program is Disney's new "pictorial interpretation" Grand Canyon, which uses the music of Ferde Grofé's Grand Canyon Suite. Grand Canyon wins an Academy Award for Best Documentary (Short Subject).
- February 3
  - A chartered plane transporting musicians Buddy Holly, Ritchie Valens and The Big Bopper crashes in foggy conditions near Clear Lake, Iowa, killing all four occupants on board, including pilot Roger Peterson. The tragedy is later termed "The Day the Music Died", popularized in Don McLean's 1971 song "American Pie". Future country star Waylon Jennings was scheduled to be on the plane, but gave up his seat to The Big Bopper.
  - American Airlines Flight 320, a Lockheed L-188 Electra from Chicago crashes into the East River on approach to New York City's LaGuardia Airport, killing 65 of the 73 people on board.
- February 6 — At Cape Canaveral, Florida, the first successful test firing of a Titan intercontinental ballistic missile is accomplished.
- February 13 — TAT-2, AT&T's second transatlantic telephone cable, goes into operation.
- February 17 — The Vanguard II weather satellite is launched to measure cloud cover for the United States Navy.
- February 22 — Lee Petty wins the first Daytona 500.
- March 1 — USS Tuscaloosa, USS New Orleans, USS Tennessee and USS West Virginia are stricken from the Naval Vessel Register.
- March 3 — Lunar probe Pioneer 4 becomes the first American object to escape dominance by Earth's gravity.
- March 11 — A Raisin in the Sun by Lorraine Hansberry opens on Broadway in New York City.
- March 18 — U.S. President Dwight D. Eisenhower signs a bill allowing for Hawaiian statehood.
- March 31 — The first Busch Gardens amusement park, in Tampa, Florida, is dedicated and opens its gates.

=== April–June ===
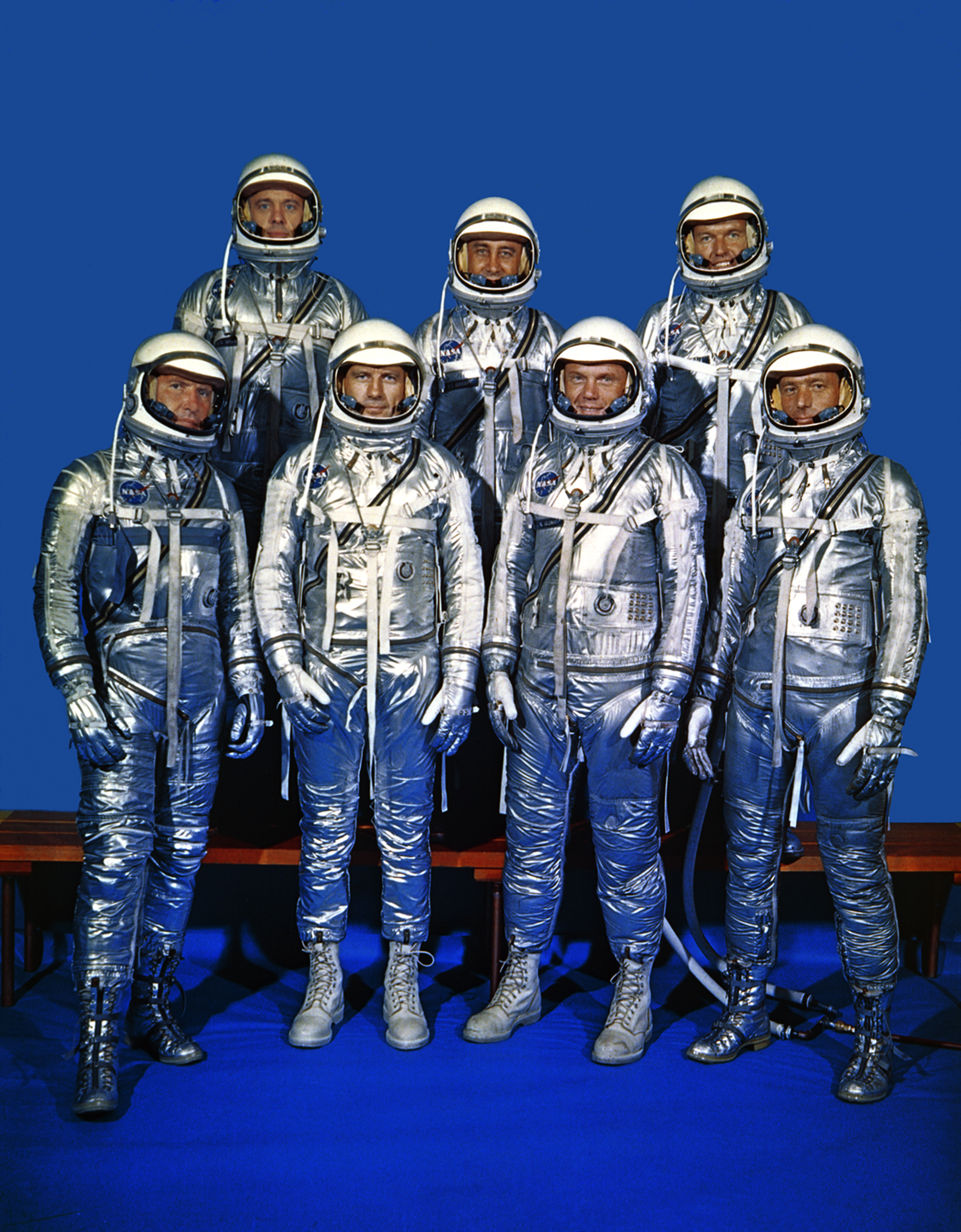
April 9: NASA announces the "Mercury Seven"

- April 6 — The 31st Academy Awards ceremony, hosted by Jerry Lewis, Mort Sahl, Tony Randall, Bob Hope, David Niven and Laurence Olivier, is held at Pantages Theatre in Hollywood. Vincente Minnelli's Gigi wins a record nine awards, including Best Motion Picture and Best Director for Minnelli. The film's clean sweep of all nine of its nominations will not be tied again until 1988, and will not be broken until 2004. Gigi is also equalled in nominations by Stanley Kramer's The Defiant Ones.
- April 9 — NASA announces its selection of the "Mercury Seven", seven military pilots to become the first U.S. astronauts.
- April 25 — The Saint Lawrence Seaway linking the North American Great Lakes and the Atlantic Ocean officially opens to shipping.
- May 8 — The first Little Caesars pizza restaurant is opened by Mike Ilitch and his wife Marian in Garden City, Michigan.
- May 21 — Gypsy: A Musical Fable, starring Ethel Merman in her last new musical, opens on Broadway and runs for 702 performances.
- May 28 — Jupiter AM-18 rocket launches two primates, Miss Baker and Miss Able, into space from Cape Canaveral along with living microorganisms and plant seeds. Successful recovery makes them the first living beings to return safely to Earth after space flight.
- June 8 — USS Barbero and the United States Postal Service attempt the delivery of mail via Missile Mail.
- June 9 — The USS George Washington is launched at Groton, Connecticut, as the first submarine to carry ballistic missiles (December 30 — commissioned).
- June 14 – At Disneyland in Anaheim, California, new rides are opened in the Tomorrowland area:
  - The Disneyland Monorail, the world's first regularly operating passenger-carrying monorail (Alweg system), dedicated by U.S. Vice President Richard Nixon.
  - The Matterhorn Bobsleds, the world's first tubular steel roller coaster.
- June 23 — Convicted Manhattan Project spy Klaus Fuchs is released after nine years in a British prison and allowed to emigrate to Dresden, East Germany (where he resumes a scientific career).
- June 25 — A KH-1 Corona satellite, believed to be the first operational spy satellite, is launched as science mission 'Discoverer 4' from Vandenberg Air Force Base, California, aboard a Thor-Agena rocket.
- June 26
  - Queen Elizabeth II (as monarch of Canada) and U.S. President Dwight Eisenhower open the Saint Lawrence Seaway.
  - Darby O'Gill and the Little People, a film based on Herminie T. Kavanagh's short stories, is released in the U.S. by Walt Disney, two days after its world premiere in Ireland.

=== July–September ===
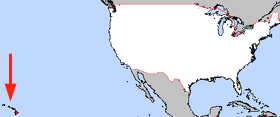
August 21: Hawaii admitted as 50th state

- July 8 — Charles Ovnand and Dale R. Buis become the first Americans killed in action in Vietnam.
- July 15 — Steel strike of 1959: Labor union strike in the U.S. steel industry.
- July 21 — Grove Press, Inc. v. Christenberry decided, affirming that copies of Lady Chatterley's Lover may be distributed in the U.S. under the First Amendment.
- July 24
  - At the opening of the American National Exhibition in Moscow, U.S. Vice President Richard Nixon and USSR Premier Nikita Khrushchev have a "kitchen debate."
  - With the admission of Alaska as the 49th U.S. state earlier in the year, the 49-star flag of the United States debuts in Philadelphia, Pennsylvania.
- August 7
  - Explorers program: Launch of Explorer 6 satellite from the Atlantic Missile Range in Cape Canaveral, Florida.
  - The Roseburg blast in Oregon, caused when a truck carrying explosives catches fire, kills 14 and causes $12 million worth of damage.
- August 17
  - The 1959 Hebgen Lake earthquake in southwest Montana kills 28.
  - Miles Davis' influential jazz album Kind of Blue is released.
- August 21 — Hawaii is admitted as the 50th and last U.S. state (see History of Hawaii).
- August 22 — American Football League founded by Lamar Hunt
- August 28–September 7 — The 1959 Pan American Games are held in Chicago.
- September 15-28 — Premier of the Soviet Union Nikita Khrushchev and his wife tour the U.S. at the invitation of President Eisenhower.
- September 16 — The Xerox 914, the first plain paper copier, is introduced to the public.
- September 17 — The hypersonic North American X-15 research aircraft, piloted by Scott Crossfield, makes its first powered flight at Edwards Air Force Base, California.

=== October–December ===
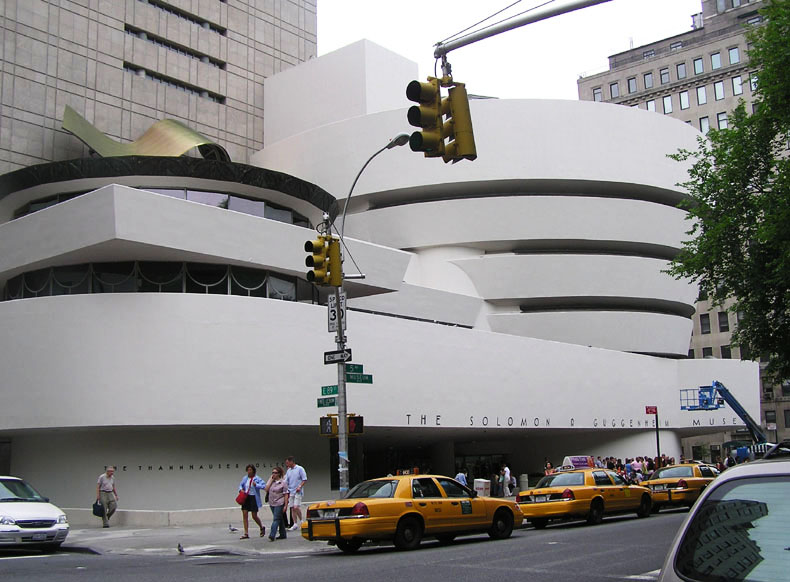
October 21: The Guggenheim opens

- October 2 — Rod Serling's classic anthology series The Twilight Zone premieres on CBS.
- October 8 — The Los Angeles Dodgers defeat the Chicago White Sox, 4 games to 2, to win their 2nd World Series Title in baseball.
- October 13 — Launch of Explorer 7 satellite.
- October 21 — The Solomon R. Guggenheim Museum of modern art (designed by Frank Lloyd Wright, who died April 9) opens to the public in New York City.
- November 15 — The brutal Clutter family murders are committed in Holcomb, Kansas.
- November 18 — MGM's widescreen, multimillion-dollar, Technicolor version of Ben-Hur, starring Charlton Heston, is released and becomes the studio's greatest hit up to this time. It is critically acclaimed and eventually wins 11 Academy Awards — a record held until 1998 (when 1997's Titanic becomes the first film to equal it).
- November 22 — Boston Patriots founded by William H. Sullivan
- November 25 — Nick Van Til and Ernie Strack open the first Strack & Van Til grocery store in Highland, Lake County, Indiana.
- November — The MOSFET (metal–oxide–semiconductor field-effect transistor), also known as the MOS transistor, is invented by Mohamed Atalla and Dawon Kahng at Bell Labs.
- December 1 — Cold War: Antarctic Treaty — 12 countries, including the United States and the Soviet Union, sign a landmark treaty, which sets aside Antarctica as a scientific preserve and bans military activity on that continent (the first arms control agreement established during the Cold War).
- December 13 — Three years after its first telecast, MGM's The Wizard of Oz (1939 film) is shown on television for the second time, but gains a larger viewing audience than its first television outing, spurring CBS to make it an annual tradition.

=== Undated ===
- The Supremes girl group is founded as The Primettes in Detroit.
- Car tailfin design reaches its apex with such as the Cadillac Eldorado, Chevrolet Impala second generation model, Dodge Silver Challenger and Imperial Crown Sedan.
- The Henney Kilowatt goes on sale in the U.S., becoming the first production electric car in almost three decades, but only 47 models will be sold in its 2-year production run.
- Nylon pantyhose (or sheer tights) are first sold on the open market as 'Panti-Legs' by Glen Raven Knitting Mills.
- First femur of Arlington Springs Man is found on Santa Rosa Island, California, by Phil C. Orr. The remains are subsequently dated to 13,000 years BP, making them potentially the oldest known human remains in North America.

=== Ongoing ===
- Cold War (1947–1991)
- Space Race (1957–1975)
- Civil Rights Movement (1954-1968)

== Births ==
=== January ===
- January 1 – Andy Andrews, tennis player
- January 2 – Joe Bevilacqua, radio producer and dramatist
- January 5 – Clancy Brown, actor and voice actor
- January 9
  - Mark Martin, race car driver and coach
  - Otis Nixon, baseball player
- January 10 – Larry McReynolds, auto racing commentator
- January 15 – Kenny Easley, American football player (d. 2025)
- January 27 – Keith Olbermann, television sports and political commentator
- January 28 – Megan McDonald, children's author
- January 29 – Michael Sloane, actor, director and screenwriter

=== February ===
- February 1 – Wade Wilson, American football player and coach (died 2019)
- February 4
  - Pamelyn Ferdin, actress and activist
  - Lawrence Taylor, American football player and sportscaster
- February 14 – Renée Fleming, soprano
- February 16 – John McEnroe, tennis player
- February 18 – James Metzger, businessman and philanthropist
- February 19 – Roger Goodell, businessman and football administrator
- February 22 – Kyle MacLachlan, actor

=== March ===
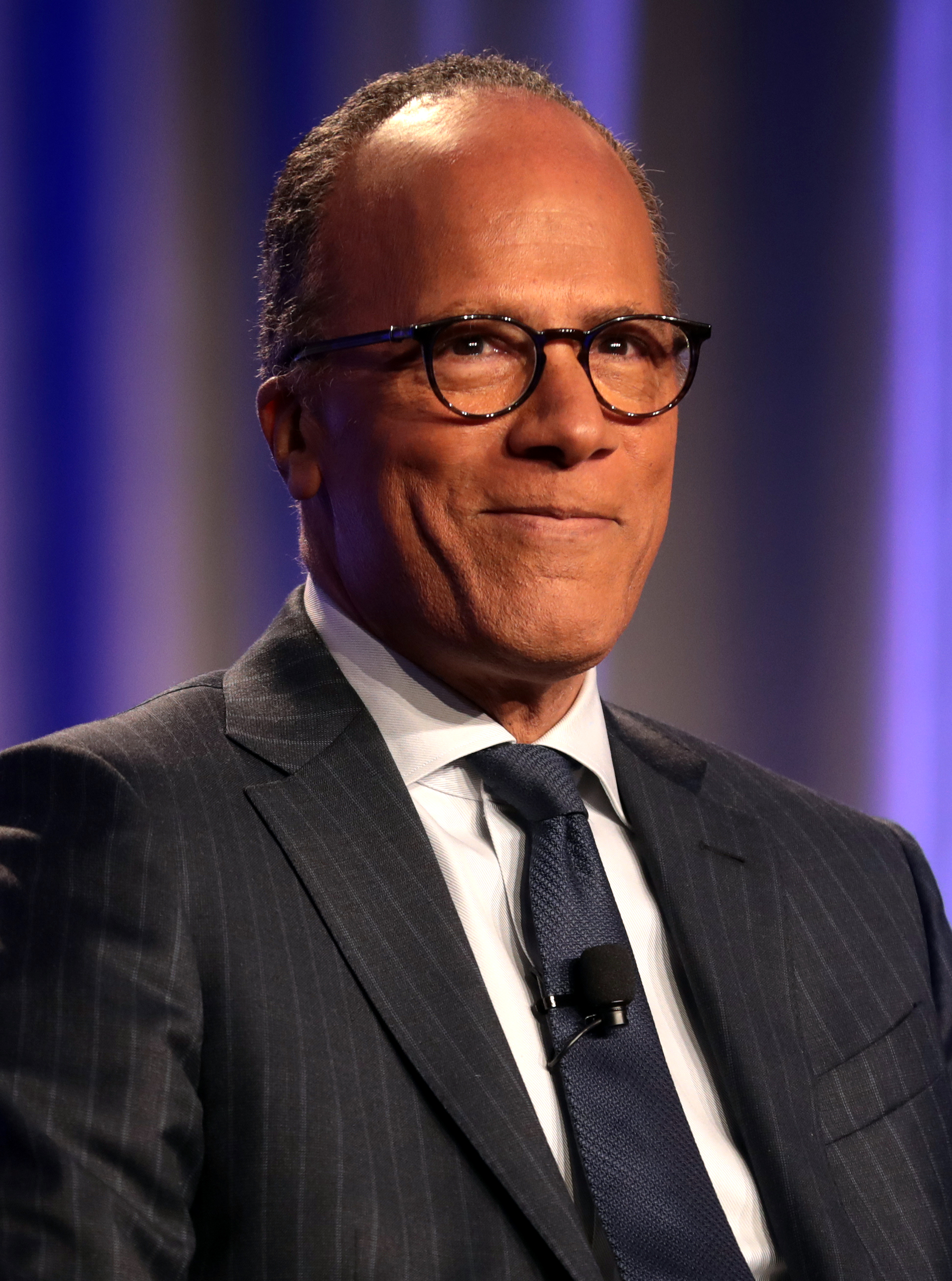
Lester Holt

- March 6 – Lars Larson, conservative talk show host
- March 8
  - Lester Holt, journalist and news anchor
  - Kato Kaelin, witness in the O. J. Simpson murder case
- March 15 – Harold Baines, baseball player and coach
- March 16 – Flavor Flav, rapper
- March 17
  - Christian Clemenson, actor
  - Danny Ainge, basketball player, coach and baseball player
- March 18 – Irene Cara, singer-songwriter and film actress (d. 2022)
- March 20 – Sting, pro wrestler
- March 22 – Matthew Modine, actor
- March 31 – Arun Raha, executive director and chief economist for Washington state

=== April ===
- April 3 – David Hyde Pierce, actor
- April 13 – Kim Guadagno, first Lt. Governor of New Jersey
- April 15 – Thomas F. Wilson, actor, writer, musician, painter, voice-over artist, stand-up comedian and podcaster
- April 18 – Susan Faludi, feminist
- April 25 – Tony Phillips, baseball player (d. 2016)

=== May ===
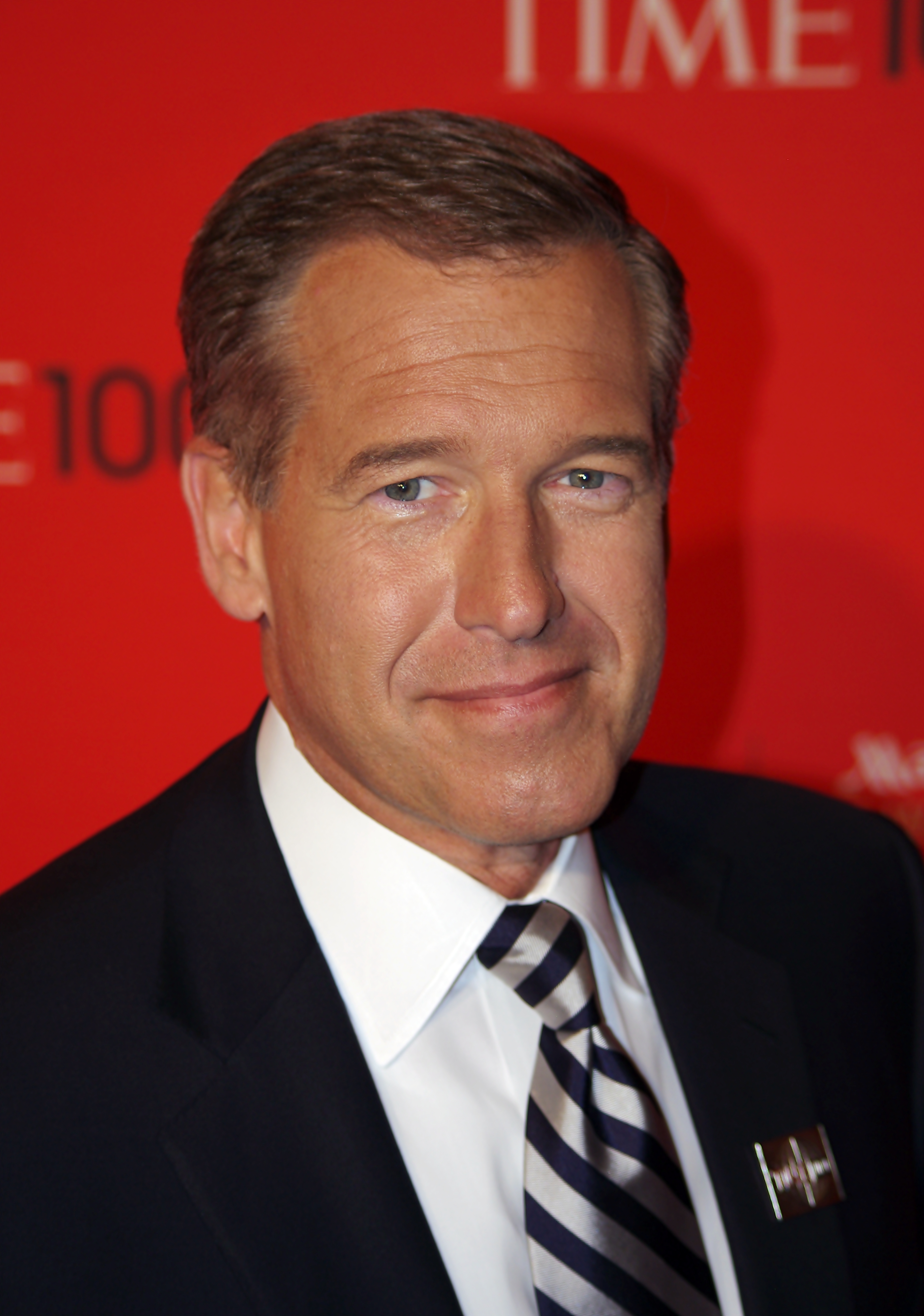
Brian Williams

- May 5 – Brian Williams, television journalist
- May 8 – Ronnie Lott, American football player and sportscaster
- May 12
  - Dave Christian, ice hockey player
  - Ray Gillen, rock singer-songwriter (d. 1993)
  - Ving Rhames, African-American actor
- May 17 – Jim Nantz, sportscaster
- May 19
  - Nicole Brown Simpson, second wife of O. J. Simpson and murder victim (d. 1994)
  - Jim Ward, voice actor
- May 20 – Israel Kamakawiwoʻole, Hawaiian musician (d. 1997)
- May 21 – Loretta Lynch, 83rd U.S. Attorney General from 2015 to 2017.
- May 22 – David Blatt, Israeli-American professional basketball player and coach
- May 26 – Kevin Gage, actor
- May 25 – Jim Ardis, corporate executive and politician

=== June ===
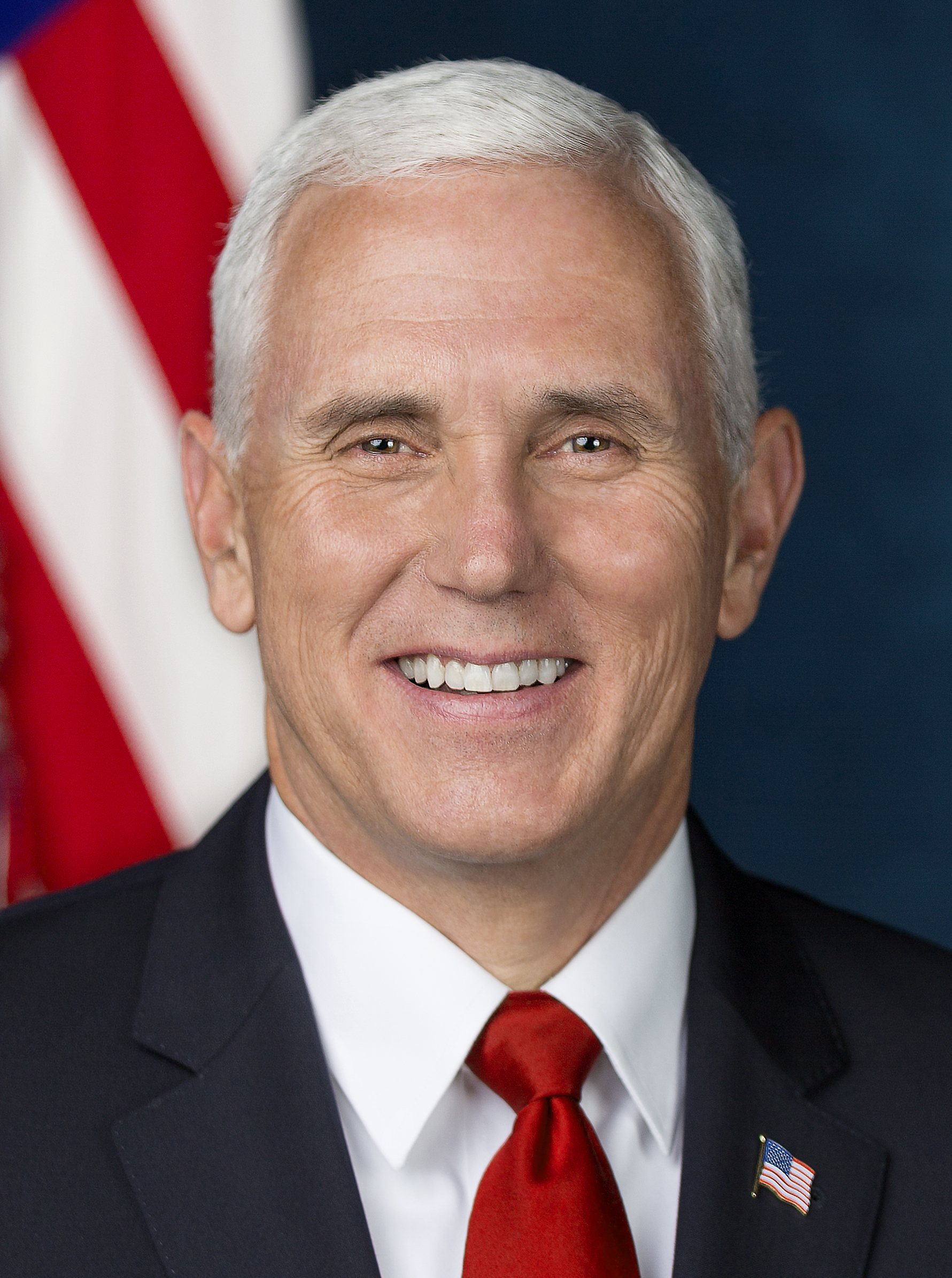
Mike Pence

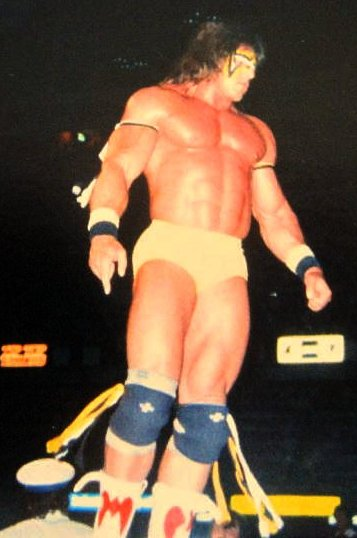
Ultimate Warrior

- June 3
  - John Carlson, radio host
  - Sam Mills, American football player (d. 2005)
- June 6 – Paul Germain, television screenwriter and producer
- June 7 – Mike Pence, 48th vice president of the United States from 2017 to 2021
- June 8 – C.T. Fletcher, powerlifter and bodybuilder
- June 9 – Miles O'Brien, television news anchor, pilot
- June 10
  - Anjani, singer-songwriter and pianist
  - Eliot Spitzer, Governor of New York from 2007 to 2008
- June 11
  - Magnum T. A. (Terry Allen), wrestler
  - Stephen Sweeney, politician
- June 13 – Jim Irsay, businessman (d. 2025)
- June 14 – Marcus Miller, African American jazz musician
- June 15 – Eileen Davidson, actress and author
- June 16 – The Ultimate Warrior, professional wrestler (died 2014)
- June 27 – Jeff Miller, politician

=== July ===
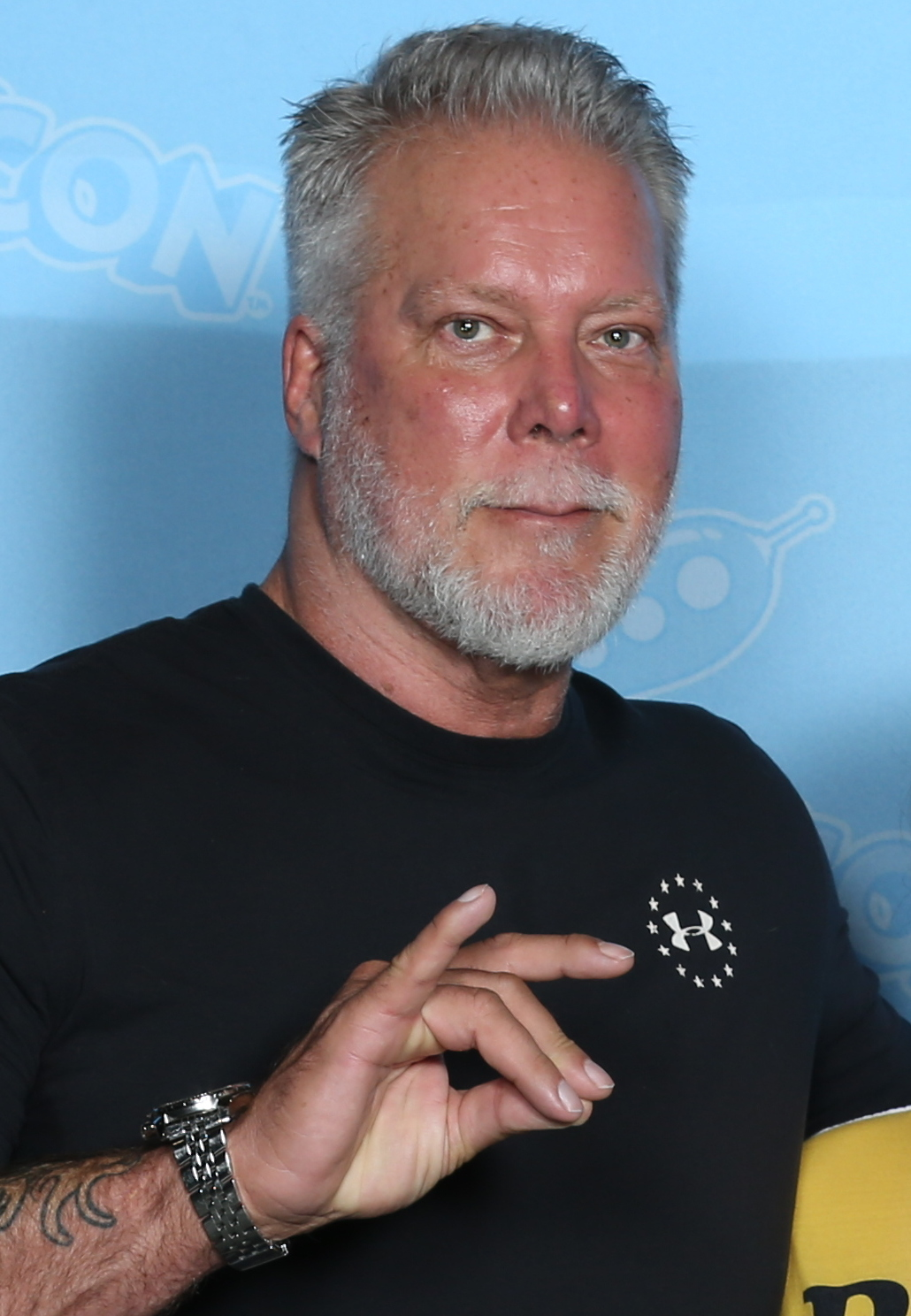
Kevin Nash

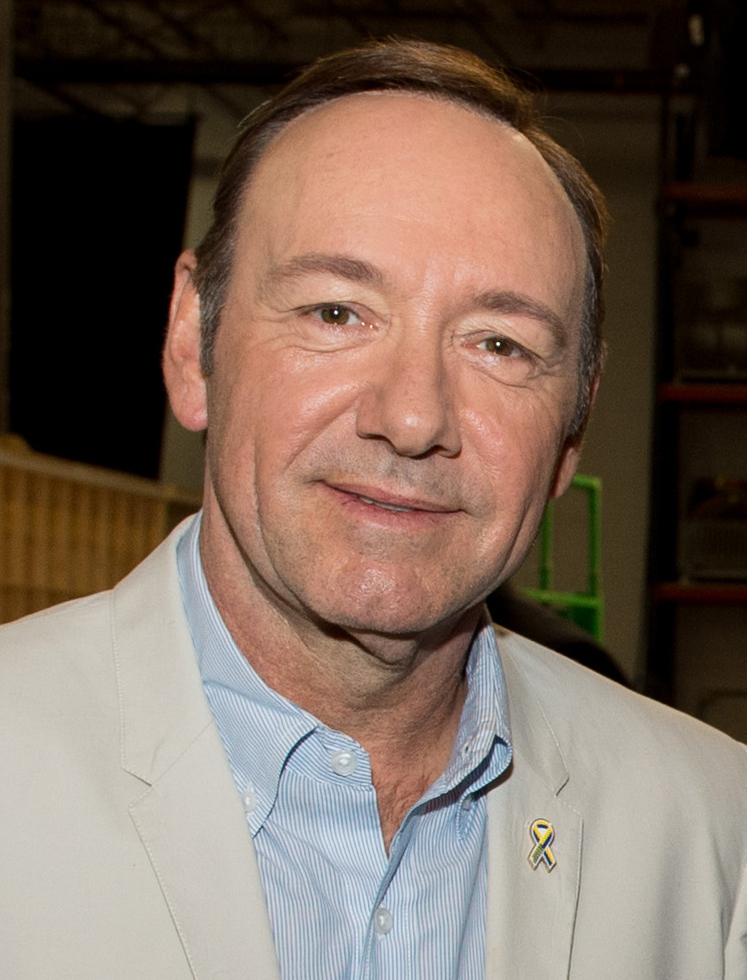
Kevin Spacey

- July 1 – Dale Midkiff, actor
- July 5 – Marc Cohn, singer-songwriter
- July 6 – Glenn Kessler, journalist
- July 7 – Ben Linder, engineer (d. 1987)
- July 8 – Robert Knepper, actor
- July 9 – Kevin Nash, pro wrestler
- July 12 – Rolonda Watts, actress, producer, voiceover artist, novelist, motivational speaker, and television and radio talk show host
- July 14 – Susana Martinez, Governor of New Mexico from 2011 to 2019
- July 16 – Bob Joles, voice actor and musician
- July 21 – Terry Long, football player (d. 2005)
- July 22 – Ed Tarver, lawyer (died 2024)
- July 23 – Carl Phillips, poet
- July 26
  - Rick Bragg, journalist
  - Kevin Spacey, actor and director
- July 27 – Hugh Green, American football player
- July 28 – Mark Meadows, politician
- July 31 – Scott Pilarz, Jesuit priest and academic (died 2021)

=== August ===
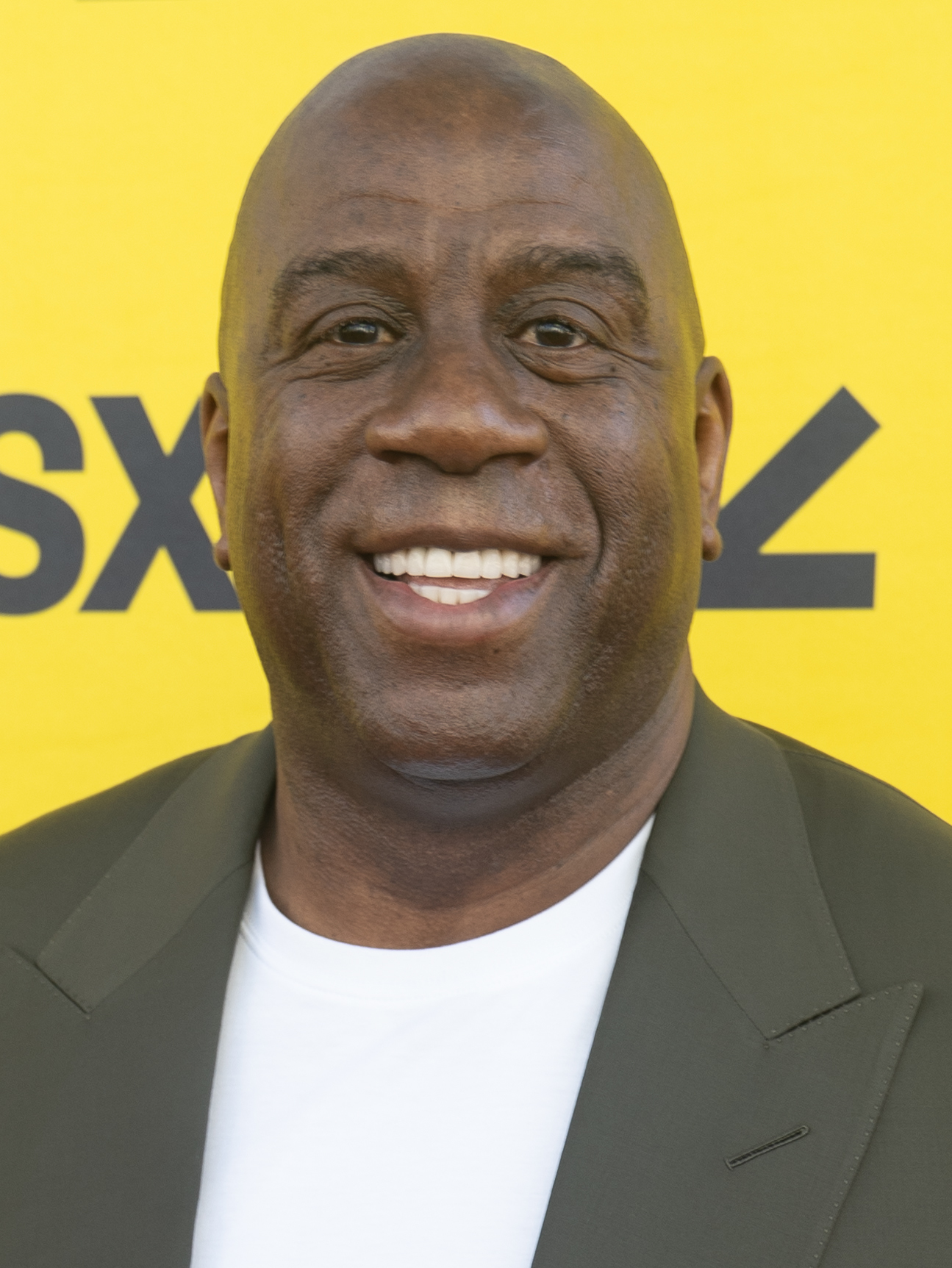
Magic Johnson

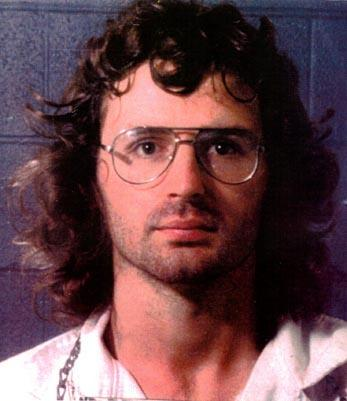
David Koresh

- August 4 – Robbin Crosby, rock guitarist (Ratt) (died 2002)
- August 10 – Rosanna Arquette, actress
- August 13 – Danny Bonaduce, actor
- August 14
  - Marcia Gay Harden, actress
  - Magic Johnson, African American basketball player
- August 15 – Scott Altman, astronaut
- August 17
  - Jonathan Franzen, novelist
  - David Koresh, spiritual leader of the Branch Davidian religious cult (d. 1993)
  - Brad Wellman, baseball player
- August 18 – Dorothy Bush Koch, author and philanthropist
- August 19 – Anthony Sowell, serial killer (died 2021)
- August 21 – Jim McMahon, American football player
- August 26 – Stan Van Gundy, basketball coach
- August 29
  - Jeff Adachi, attorney (died 2019)
  - Timothy Shriver, disability rights activist, film producer, educator and Chairman of Special Olympics

=== September ===
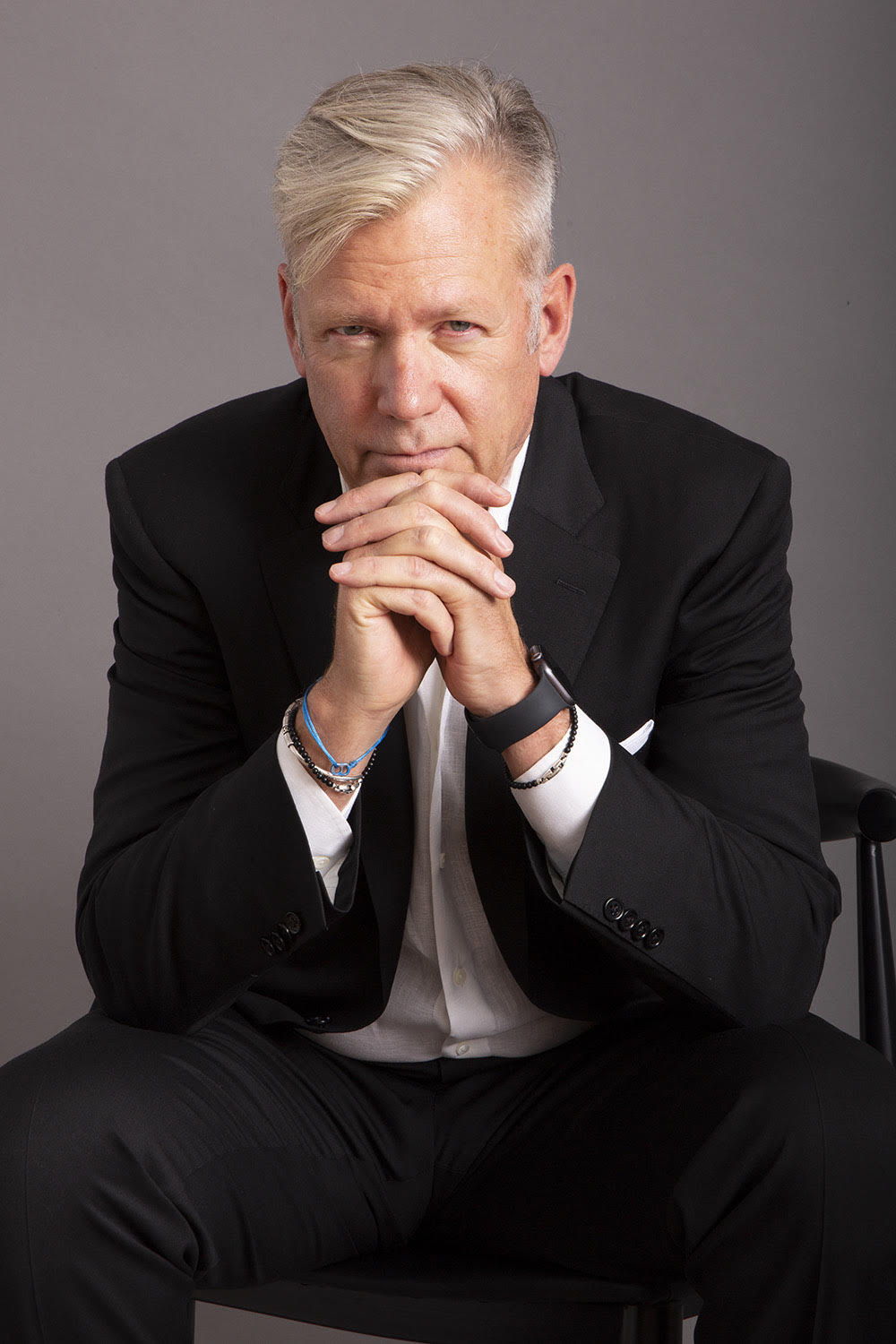
Chris Hansen

- September 1
  - Keith Clearwater, golfer
  - Kenny Mayne, American football player and journalist
  - Joe Jusko, illustrator and painter
- September 10 – Michael Earl, puppeteer (died 2015)
- September 11 – Robert Wrenn, golfer and sportscaster
- September 12 – Scott Brown, U.S. Senator from Massachusetts from 2010 to 2013
- September 13 – Chris Hansen, journalist
- September 14
  - Mary Crosby, actress
  - Haviland Morris, actress
- September 15
  - Mark Kirk, U.S. Senator from Illinois from 2010 to 2017
  - Mike Reiss, television comedy writer
- September 16 – Tim Raines, baseball player
- September 18
  - Mark Romanek, filmmaker
  - Ryne Sandberg, baseball player (died 2025)
- September 21 – Dave Coulier, actor and comedian
- September 22 – Saul Perlmutter, astrophysicist, recipient of the Nobel Prize in Physics in 2011
- September 23 – Jason Alexander, actor
- September 24 – Steve Whitmire, puppeteer
- September 28
  - Steve Hytner, actor
  - Laura Bruce, artist

=== October ===
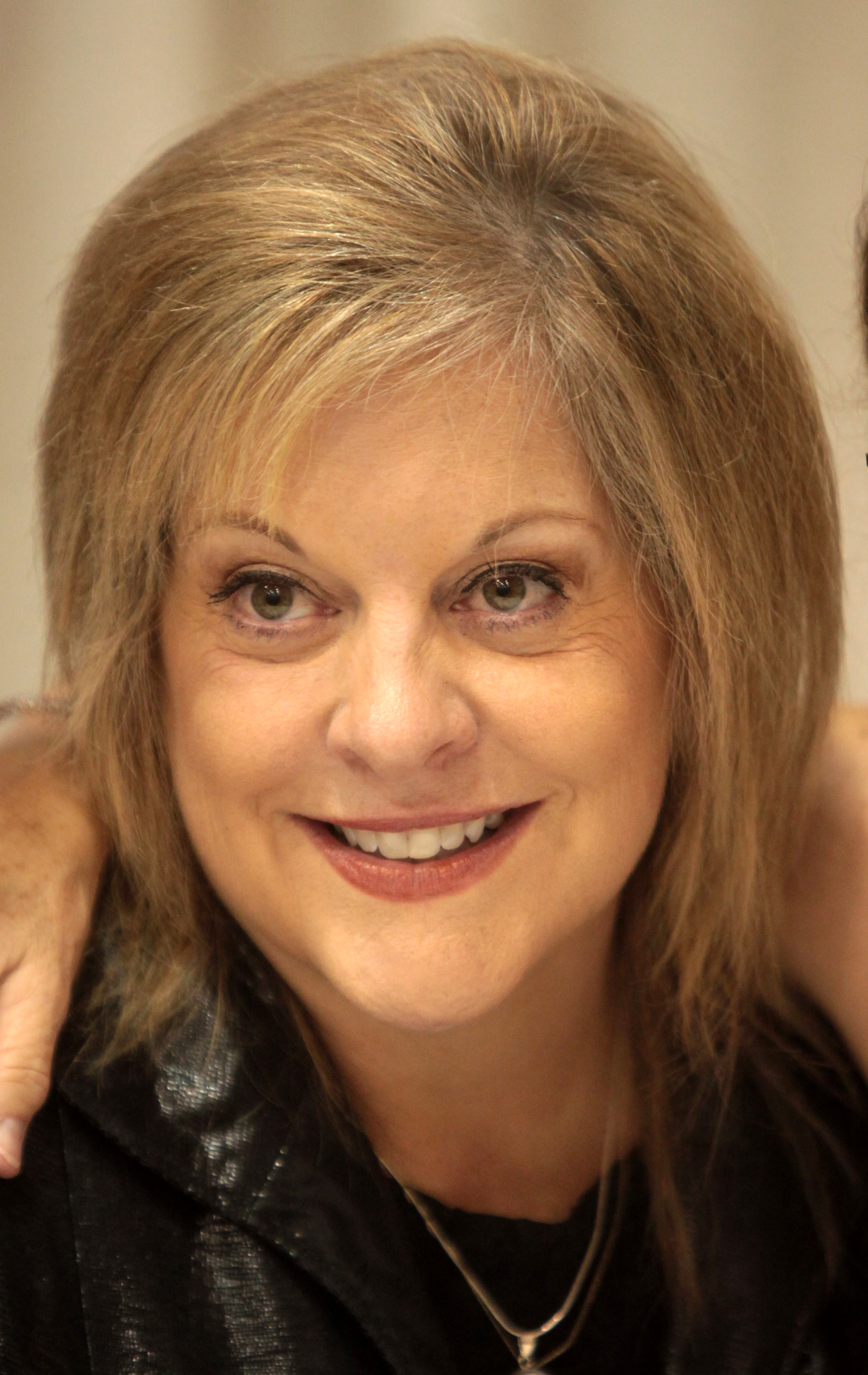
Nancy Grace

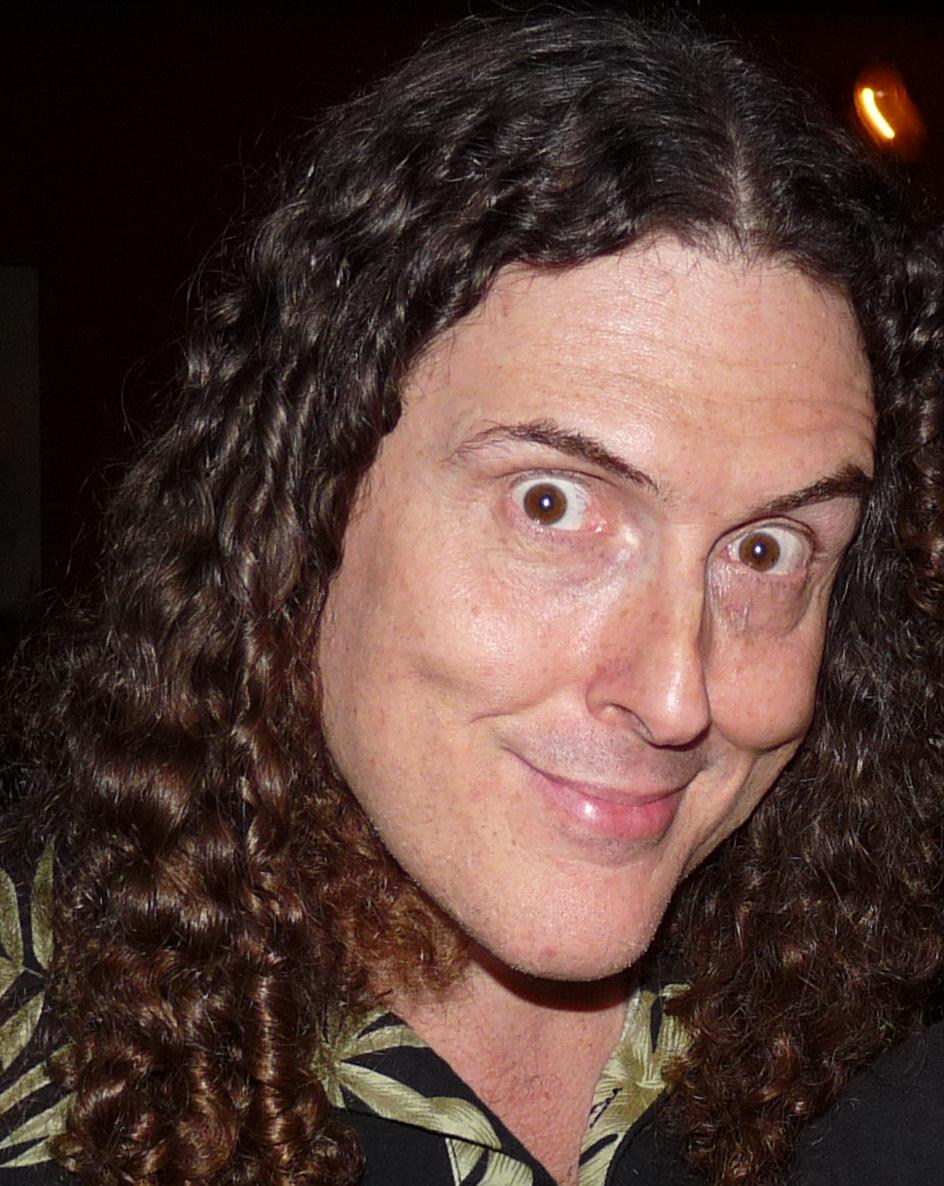
"Weird Al" Yankovic

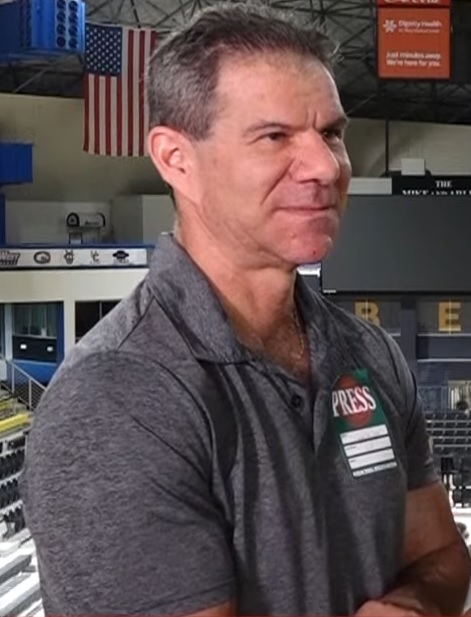
Dave Meltzer

- October 1 – Brian P. Cleary, humorist, author and poet
- October 3
  - Fred Couples, golfer
  - Greg Proops, comedian
  - Jack Wagner, actor
- October 5
  - Maya Lin, architect and sculptor, designed the Vietnam Veterans Memorial and Civil Rights Memorial
  - Kelly Joe Phelps, singer-songwriter and guitarist (died 2022)
  - David Shannon, writer and illustrator
- October 7 – Clayton Weishuhn, football player (died 2022)
- October 8
  - Nick Bakay, actor, producer and screenwriter
  - Brad Byers, entertainer
  - Tim Flakoll, national education expert and politician
  - Mike Morgan, baseball player and coach
- October 13 – Marie Osmond, country pop singer
- October 17 – Richard Roeper, film critic
- October 23
  - Nancy Grace, television host
  - Sam Raimi, film producer, writer and director
  - Tommy Vigorito, American football player (died 2025)
  - "Weird Al" Yankovic, singer, accordionist and parodist
- October 24
  - Mike Brewer, baseball player
  - Michelle Lujan Grisham, lawyer and politician
  - Dave Meltzer, journalist and historian
- October 25 – Collette Sunderman, voice director
- October 26 – Paul Farmer, anthropologist and physician (died 2022)
- October 29 – Jesse Barfield, baseball player and sportscaster

=== November ===
- November 14 – Bryan Stevenson, lawyer and social justice activist
- November 16 – RaeAnn Kelsch, politician (died 2018)
- November 17 – William R. Moses, actor
- November 19
  - Robert Barron, bishop, author and theologian
  - Jo Bonner, U.S. Representative for Alabama's 1st congressional district
  - Allison Janney, actress
- November 20
  - Raffi Hovannisian, American-born Armenian politician
  - James McGovern, lawyer and politician
  - Sean Young, actress

=== December ===
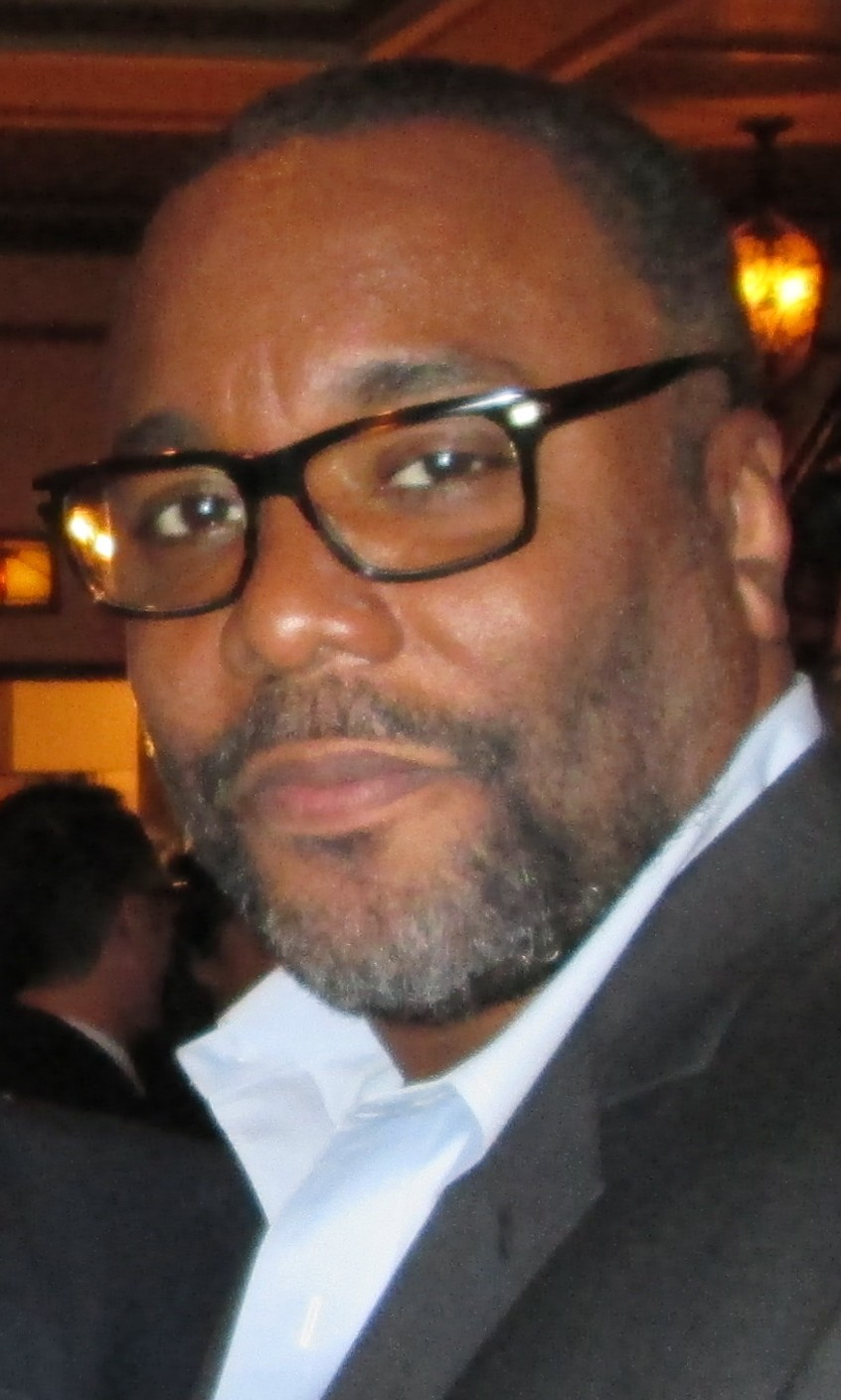
Lee Daniels

- December 2 – David Alward, 32nd Premier of New Brunswick (2010-2014)
- December 10 – Mariann Budde, Episcopal Bishop of Washington
- December 13 – Johnny Whitaker, actor
- December 15 – Betsy Arakawa, musician, wife of Gene Hackman (d. 2025)
- December 21 – Florence Griffith Joyner, African American athlete (d. 1998)
- December 24 – Lee Daniels, African American film director
- December 25 – Michael P. Anderson, astronaut (d. 2003)
- December 31
  - Al Giordano, journalist and political activist (d. 2023)
  - Val Kilmer, actor (d. 2025)

== Deaths ==
- January 21
  - Carl "Alfalfa" Switzer, actor (born 1927)
  - Cecil B. DeMille, film director (born 1881)
- January 22 – Elisabeth Moore, tennis player (born 1876)
- January 28 – Walter Beall, baseball player (born 1899)
- February 3 –
  - Herbert Greenwald, real estate developer (born 1915)
- "The Day the Music Died" plane crash
  - The Big Bopper, disc jockey and singer-songwriter (born 1930)
  - Buddy Holly, singer-songwriter and a pioneer of rock and roll (born 1936)
  - Ritchie Valens, Mexican-American singer-songwriter and guitarist (born 1941)
- February 4
  - Robert Emerson, scientist (born 1903)
  - Una O'Connor, Irish-born American actress (born 1880)
- February 7 – Nap Lajoie, baseball player (Cleveland Indians) and a member of the MLB Hall of Fame (born 1874)
- February 11 – Marshall Teague, race car driver (born 1921)
- February 14 – Baby Dodds, jazz drummer (born 1898)
- February 20 – Ray McDonald, dancer, (born 1920)
- February 22 – Helen Parrish, film actress, cancer (born 1924)
- February 23 – Joseph DuMoe, football coach (born 1895)
- February 28
  - Beatrix Farrand, landscape gardener and architect (born 1872)
  - Maxwell Anderson, playwright, author, poet, journalist, and lyricist (born 1888)
  - Mack Gordon, lyricist (born 1904)
- March 3 – Lou Costello, actor and comedian, part of Abbott & Costello team (born 1906)
- March 4 – Maxie Long, track athlete (born 1878)
- March 15 – Duncan Hines, author and food critic (born 1880)
- March 16 – John Sailing, last documented Civil War veteran (age 111)
- March 26 – Raymond Chandler, American-British novelist and screenwriter (born 1888)
- March 27 – Grant Withers, American actor (born 1905)
- March 30 – Reginald R. Belknap, United States Navy rear admiral (born 1871)
- April 9 – Frank Lloyd Wright, architect, interior designer, writer and educator (born 1867)
- April 13 – James Gleason, actor, playwright, and screenwriter (born 1882)
- April 17 – Cecil Cunningham, American actress (born 1888)
- April 18 – Irving Cummings, actor and director (born 1888)
- April 27 – Gordon Armstrong, inventor of the baby incubator
- May 3 – Troy Sanders, film score composer (born 1901)
- May 4 – William S. Pye, admiral (born 1880)
- May 14 – Sidney Bechet, jazz saxophonist, clarinetist, and composer (born 1897)
- May 15 – Joe Cook, actor (born 1890)
- May 23 – Earl D. Hall, Wisconsin politician (born 1879)
- May 24 – John Foster Dulles, politician, lawyer, and diplomat (born 1888)
- May 26 – Ed Walsh, baseball player (born 1881)
- June 2 – Orelia Key Bell, poet (born 1864)
- June 12 – Clyde E. Elliott, American director, producer and writer (b. 1885)
- June 16 – George Reeves, actor (born 1914)
- June 18 – Ethel Barrymore, actress (born 1879)
- June 22 – Bruce Harlan, diver (born 1926)
- June 25 – Charles Starkweather, spree killer, judicially executed by electrocution (born 1938)
- July 8 – 1st Americans killed in Vietnam War
  - Dale R. Buis, military advisor (born 1921)
  - Chester M. Ovnand, military advisor (born 1914)
- July 17 – Billie Holiday, jazz singer (born 1915)
- July 20 – William D. Leahy, naval officer (born 1875)
- July 30 – Heinie Conklin, actor (born 1886)
- August 6 – Preston Sturges, playwright, screenwriter, and film director (born 1898)
- August 8 – Henry St. George Tucker, Episcopal bishop and reverend (born 1874)
- August 16
  - Benny Fields, singer (born 1894)
  - William Halsey Jr., U.S. vice-admiral (Pacific War) (born 1882)
- August 16 – Blind Willie McTell, blues and ragtime singer and guitarist (born 1898)
- September 1 – Jack Norworth, songwriter, singer, and vaudeville performer (born 1879)
- September 6 – Edmund Gwenn, British actor (born 1877)
- September 11 – Paul Douglas, actor (born 1907)
- September 13 – Adrian, costume designer (born 1903)
- September 14 – Wayne Morris, actor and flying ace (born 1914)
- September 24 – James V. Allred, politician, 33rd Governor of Texas (born 1899)
- September 25 – Helen Broderick, actress (born 1891)
- September 28 – Vincent Richards, tennis player (born 1903)
- September 30 – Taylor Holmes, actor (born 1878)
- October 7 – Mario Lanza, opera singer (born 1921)
- October 11 – Bert Bell, 2nd commissioner of the National Football League (born 1895)
- October 12 – Edward Keane, actor (born 1884)
- October 14 – Errol Flynn, film actor, heart attack (born 1909 in Australia)
- October 16
  - Minor Hall, jazz musician (born 1897)
  - George C. Marshall, U.S. army general (born 1880)
- October 18 – Edward Hanson, 28th Governor of American Samoa (born 1889)
- October 25 – Genevieve R. Cline, jurist (born 1879)
- November 4 – Lefty Williams, baseball player (born 1893)
- November 7 – Victor McLaglen, British-American actor and boxer (born 1886)
- November 21 – Max Baer, heavyweight boxing champion (born 1909)
- November 30 – Arthur Q. Bryan, actor, voice actor, comedian and radio personality (born 1899)
- December 7 – Charlie Hall, British actor (born 1899)
- December 9 – Donald MacDonald, actor (born 1898)
- December 12
  - Marcella Craft, soprano (born 1874)
  - Russell Simpson, actor (born 1880)
- December 14 – Edna Wallace Hopper, actress (born 1872)
- December 24 – Edmund Goulding, director (born 1891)

== See also ==
- List of American films of 1959
- Timeline of United States history (1950–1969)
