= Ashna Mehta =

Indian jewellery designer and entrepreneur

- Born: Ashna Mehta; April 18, 1996 (age 30); Antwerp, Belgium
- Education: New York University
- Occupations: Jewellery designer, entrepreneur
- Years active: 2022–present
- Known for: Founder of Bag Bijoux

Ashna Mehta (born 18 April 1996) is an Indian jewellery designer and entrepreneur. She is the co-founder of the Dubai-based brand Bag Bijoux, noted for high-end jewellery charms designed for luxury handbags. Her designs have been featured in international media outlets such as Vogue, Harper’s Bazaar Arabia, the Financial Times, and Page Six.

== Early life and education ==
Mehta was born in Antwerp, Belgium, into a family of Indian diamantaires associated with Rosy Blue, a leading diamond conglomerate. She studied at New York University before relocating to Dubai, where she worked alongside her mother, designer Payal Mehta, in her atelier.

== Career ==
In 2022, Mehta and her sister Aria co-founded Bag Bijoux, a Dubai-based jewellery brand specialising in gemstone charms designed for luxury handbags. The charms gained international attention at the 2024 Ambani wedding, where they were seen on Hermès Birkin and Kelly bags and subsequently went viral.

The brand debuted at Paris Fashion Week at Lapérouse in collaboration with Vogue, and was later presented at Sotheby’s in Dubai and Paris. In 2025, Harper’s Bazaar India profiled Mehta’s design philosophy in her “True Impression” collection inspired by artisanal craft. Harper’s Bazaar Arabia also profiled her Birkin collection in 2025, describing it as a “sparkling legacy.”

In January 2025, actress Mindy Kaling was photographed with a Hermès Kelly bag customised with Bag Bijoux charms engraved with her children’s names, drawing media coverage.

Mehta has designed custom pieces for celebrities including Kim Kardashian, Kylie Jenner, Paris Hilton, Winnie Harlow, and Isha Ambani.

In 2022, she created Nicki Minaj’s diamond “Barbie” pendant, which was later featured in the exhibition Ice Cold: An Exhibition of Hip-Hop Jewelry at the American Museum of Natural History in 2024.

In 2025, Bag Bijoux received international attention after reality television personality Kylie Jenner was seen carrying a handbag featuring a custom Bag Bijoux charm. In an interview with Khaleej Times, Mehta stated that the moment "solidified bag jewellery as a new product category" and brought wider recognition to her work.

Her designs have also been associated with high-profile clients including Nita Ambani, whose customised Hermès Birkin bag featuring jewellery elements was covered in international media.
