= Russell Mehta =

Indian businessman

- Born: Russell Arunbhai Mehta
- Occupation: Businessman
- Title: Managing director, Rosy Blue India
- Spouse: Mona Mehta
- Children: 3
- Parent: Arunkumar Mehta

Russell Arunbhai Mehta is an Indian businessman. He is the managing director of Rosy Blue India, the Indian arm of the family-owned Indian conglomerate with interests in retail, media, real estate, financial services and diamonds Rosy Blue.

== Early life ==
Russell Mehta is the son of Arunkumar Mehta, a co-founder of B. Arunkumar & Co, founded in 1960 in Mumbai, and which later became Rosy Blue.

== Career ==
Mehta is the managing director of the Indian arm, Rosy Blue India, of the family-owned Indian conglomerate with interests in real estate, financial services, retail and diamonds Rosy Blue.

Rosy Blue is ranked in the top diamond companies of India.

== Personal life ==
Russell Mehta is married to Mona and they have three children.

In May 2017 in Bahrain, their youngest daughter Diya Mehta married Ayush Jatia, son of Amit Jatia who holds the McDonald's franchise for the west and south of India through his company, Hardcastle Restaurants.

Their other daughter, Shloka Mehta is a director of the Rosy Blue Foundation, and is married to Akash Ambani, the son of Mukesh Ambani, in March 2019.
