= Arun Bhardwaj =

Indian ultramarathon runner

- Born: 24 February 1969 (age 56); India

Arun Bhardwaj (born 24 February 1969) is a career civil servant and an ultramarathon runner from New Delhi, India. In 2009, he won the 567 km George Archer 6 day race in South Africa. In December 2010, he ran 186.4 kilometres (115.8 mi) in 24 hours in Kolkata, India and thus beat his previous best of running 177 km in 24 hours.

== Badwater Ultramarathon 2011 participation ==
After completing the George Archer 6 day race in South Africa, Bhardwaj was invited to race in the Badwater Ultramarathon in Death Valley, California, USA, which has been deemed by National Geographic as the toughest organised race in the world. He participated in the 34th edition of the Badwater Ultramarathon between 11 July and 13 July. On 13 July, he completed the race in his first attempt with a time of 41 hours 6 minutes and 1 second.

== Personal life ==
He was born in Baghpat in Uttar Pradesh, and lives in Uttarkashi with his wife and children.

== Achievements in international ultramarathon events ==
•138.172 km in IAU Asia 24 hr Track Championships in Taiwan on 2–3 March 2002 (9th place). First Indian representative in any 24 hr Ultra Marathon

°516 km in Self-Transcendence 6-Days race, New York 27 April – 3 May 2003 and became the first Indian to cross 500 km in a 6-Days race (7th Place)

°Finished IAU 100 km World Cup 2003, Taiwan 16.11.2003. Became first ever Indian to participate and finish any 100 km World Cup

° 155 km in 24hr Commonwealth Ultramarathon Championships, Wales (2011)
