= Arun Prasad =

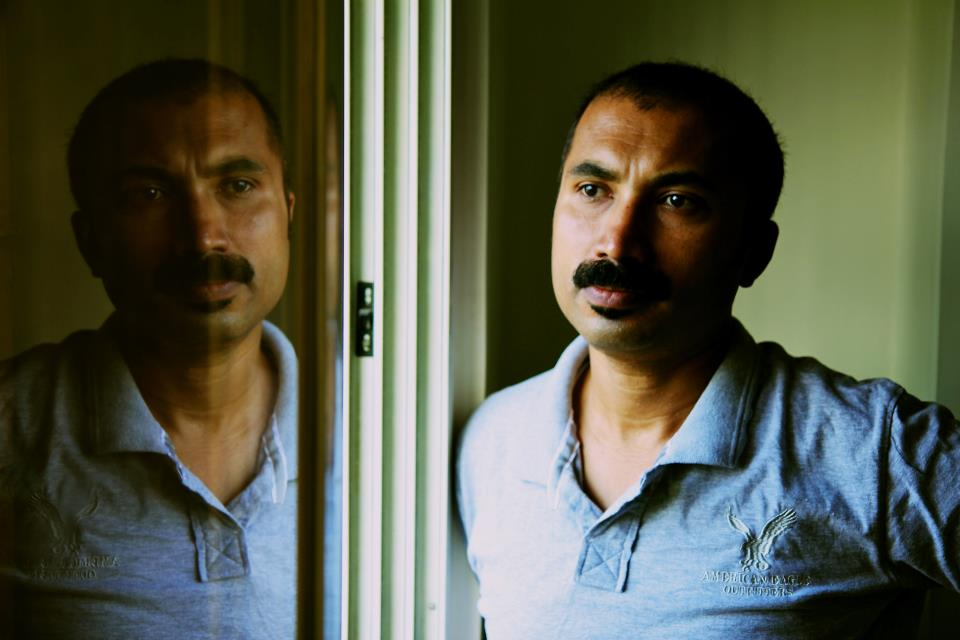
- Arun Prasad at Comic Con Exhibition at Mumbai in 2012
- Born: Kerala, India

Arun Prasad is an historian specialised in the history of karnataka, a comics archivist and a pannapictagraphist (comics collector). He is also a researcher, freelance writer and columnist on the heritage of Bangalore and presently the Project & Research Head of Discover Bengaluru, an organisation documenting the Bangalore city's heritage and history.

His comics collection includes more than 17,000 rare and old Indian/Western comics including rarest of Amar Chitra Katha, Indrajal Comics, Tinkle, Mandrake the Magician and The Phantom. He also possesses the complete collection of Indrajal Comics (published by Bennett, Coleman).

== Awards and recognition ==
- He was described and called as "one of India's most serious comic collectors" and "India's comic king" by the Mid-Day Magazine in December 2013.
- In August 2014 he was one of the featured collectors on The Great India Collectors Ride (History Channel).
- He won Indian Comics Fandom Award 2014 for Best Comics Collector in November 2014.
- One of the featured Pannapictagraphists (December 2014 - February 2015) in daily e-paper World Comics & Graphic Novels News(WCGNN) published by Freelance talents.
