= Rosy Blue =

Indian-Belgian company

Rosy Blue is a privately owned Indian-Belgian company that has interests in clean energy, media, real estate, financial services and retail. The company also trades in precious commodities, rough diamonds, manufactures and distributes polished diamonds, precious/semi-precious gems and jewellery.

The company is one of the largest diamond and gemstone traders worldwide and has 12 offices in seven countries around the world: Belgium, Israel, Hong Kong, Japan, United States, China, UAE (Dubai). Russell Mehta is the current chairman and managing director.

Rosy Blue is a De Beers sightholder.

== History ==
The company was founded in 1960 by Arunkumar Mehta and his uncle Bhanuchandra Bhansali. In the 70’s the company headquartered in Antwerp, Belgium and expanded its operations to several other diamond centers.

In 2005 Rosy Blue became a founding and certified member of the Responsible Jewellery Council.

In 2008 Rosy Blue became a signatory to the United Nations Global Compact.

In 2017, Rosy Blue was named in both Panama Papers and Paradise Papers as an entity which transferred money to safe havens to avoid taxes in the country.
