= Arun Verma =

Indian politician

Members of the Uttar Pradesh Legislative Assembly
- In office 15 March 2012 – 11 March 2017
- Constituency: Sadar Sultanpur

Personal details
- Born: 12 June 1986 (age 40) Sultanpur, Uttar Pradesh, India
- Party: Samajwadi Party
- Spouse: Nivedita Verma
- Profession: Politician, actor, musical artist

Arun Verma (born 12 June 1986) is an Indian musical artist, politician and actor. He is a member of the Samajwadi Party. He was previously MLA of Sadar constituency of Sultanpur, Uttar Pradesh.

He was India's second youngest MLA (at the age of 25) after Umed Singh of Rajasthan Legislative Assembly. Arun Verma also Awarded From Indian student parliament for Adarsh Yuva Vidhayak Puraskar (Awards for Best Young Legislator). Arun is also identified as one of the closest MLA's to Chief Minister Akhilesh Yadav and member of his team Eleven.

== Early life and education ==
Arun Verma was born in Sultanpur, Uttar Pradesh. His father was Kamal Kant Verma a farmer and Gram Pradhan. Verma completed his basic education from government primary schools and Pandit Raja Ram Tiwari Inter College in Sultanpur. In 2003, Arun was admitted to Saroj Institute of Management and Technology in Lucknow to pursue B Tech.

According to his political Advisor Ankaj Tiwari, a chance meeting with Akhilesh Yadav in December 2003 changed the course of his career. Inspired by Akhilesh's advice, Arun began visiting Sultanpur whenever he had time off from his studies, and worked for the availability of water and power to poor farmers. Arun received recognition for his work and was appointed state secretary of the Samajwadi Party Lohiya Vahini in 2006.

== Political career ==
He joined Samajwadi Party in 2004. Arun was the youngest chosen consistent from Akhilesh's band of followers, who got the party ticket to contest at the age of 25. He credits Akhilesh for making the party field young candidates who, he says, made a vital connect with the youth of the state.

Arun is Uttar Pradesh's youngest MLA. During the 2012 Assembly Elections, the SP gave him a ticket from Sultanpur Sadar Assembly, a constituency which the party had never won. Arun won from this Congress and BSP stronghold and became the first SP MLA from here.

Arun defeated BSP strong holding contestant Raj Prakash Upadhyaya and became one of the big margin winners.

On 13 February 2017, Arun was booked for allegedly murdering a woman who had accused him and seven others of gang rape in 2013.
