= Arun Muthukrishnan =

Indian motorcycle racer

Arun Muthukrishnan (born 2 November 1991 in Chennai, India). He started his career in motorcycle racing with a burning passion for the sport. He has finished 2nd in the 2012 SIDVIN MMSC-FMSCI Indian national motorcycle championship and 3rd in the Yamaha one make championship 2012. Arun Muthukrishnan has also represented India in the 2012 Yamaha ASEAN cup held in Philippines.

== Personal life ==
Arun Muthukrishnan is the only son of an entrepreneur, P.Muthukrishnan and principal, high school, Surya Kumari Muthukrishnan. He was born and raised in Chennai, Tamil Nadu, India. He completed his schooling in March, 2009 in a city school, SBOA School & Junior College. His interest in the working of machines and engines drove him towards studying mechanical engineering. He is a mechanical engineer by graduate, which helps him with wide knowledge on race machines and wider exposure on building it the way he wants.

== Career in motorcycle racing ==
Arun Muthukrishnan first visited the Irungattukottai Race Track, Sriperumbudur, Chennai, India, in 2010. He made necessary arrangements at once and decided to race. It was during a practice session that he crashed and totaled his bike. Due to the lack of finances and family support, he was unable to invest in his racing. It was in the year 2012, when he received the approval of his parents, that he began to build his racing career.

The first round of the national championship was held in the month of April 2012 in the Kari Speedway in Coimbatore. He participated in two categories, Group-D 4 stroke up to 165cc novice and Yamaha one make novice. He qualified sixth on the grid for the group-D national championship and qualified pole in the Yamaha one make. However, he crashed in both the Yamaha one make races. He finished third and fourth in the group-D national championship races. Later in the second round of the national championship held in MMRT Chennai, Arun Muthukrishnan participated in another category, TVS Apache 180cc one make championship where he qualified fourteenth in the grid for the TVS one make race due to bike problems but finished second in both the races. In Yamaha one make races he qualified second and finished race one and two in the second and fifth places respectively and in the group-D national championship he finished the first and second races in the top spot of the podium.

In the third round of the national championship he won both the races of the group-D national championship, he finished second and third in the TVS one make races and first and fourth in the Yamaha one make races. During round four of the group-D national championship qualifying, he crashed and broke his left wrist and this injury prevented him from participating in any race for the weekend. Later in the final round of the national championship, Arun Muthukrishnan was the only rider to have been on the podium six times that weekend. He won both the races in the Group-D national championship races, finished second and first in the TVS one make championship races and third and first in the Yamaha one make championship races. These victories placed him second overall in the national championship behind the leader by 4 points, fourth in the overall TVS APACHE 180cc One make championship and third in the overall Yamaha one make championship.

== Yamaha ASEAN cup 2012, Philippines ==
Arun Muthukrishnan was one of the top 3 riders in India who were selected to participate in the ASEAN cup, Philippines. It was totally a different type of race where Indian riders had zero experience, yet he managed to qualify twentieth out of the twenty four at the grid. At the first race, Arun Muthukrishnan crashed in the third lap and rode again to finish seventeenth and in the second race he crashed and damaged the bike.

== 2013 ==
The year 2013 had been a really tough on Arun, he did not have funding to participate in the Group C national championship. He still had managed to race in the one make category. He did face a lot of technical trouble with the bikes and was able to make it on the podium only thrice that year.

== 2014 ==
Arun participated only in the TVS and Yamaha One make championship and finished 5th and 6th respectively. he had struggled all year and couldn't get on the podium even once.

== 2015 ==
New rules were brought in by the organizers and One make championship competitors were allowed to participate only with a single manufacturer championship. Arun decided to participate in the TVS one make championship, but missed out on the first round that was held in Coimbatore. He later managed to get on the podium in the 4th round of the TVS RTR One make championship in 3rd place. The last round of the championship was held in the Buddh International Circuit in New Delhi and for the first time Arun managed podium finishes in both the races. Race 1 was a 4 way battle for 1st place and Kannan was victorious leaving Arun in 2nd and Aravind in 3rd. Race 2 had the similar contest but Arun crashed out 2 corners before the race finish trying to overtake Kannan, but Arun managed to finish 3rd.

== Gusto Racing India ==
In 2016 Gusto Racing India Team was formed which was headed by 7 time National Champion Mr Emmanuel Jebaraj. Gusto Racing is one of the official Racing School for KTM India. Arun was selected as one of the instructor along with Ramesh, Sudhakar and Karthik Purshutoman.

== 2016 ==
Arun decided to Race again in the TVS Apache RTR200 One make championship, but missed out on the first 3rounds. Round 4 which was held in Buddh International Circuit saw Arun Finish both the races in 3rd position. The last round of the championship was held in January 2017 at Madras Motorsports Race Track in Chennai. Arun had tough competition from the championship leader Kannan, Prashant, Shyam Shankar, Vivek Pillai, Naveen Raj and Aravind Ganesh. He finished 2nd in race 1 after Kannan and in Race 2 Arun managed to bag the 1st place.
