= Arunkumar Mehta =

Indian businessman (1940–2020)

- Born: Arunkumar Ramniklal Mehta; 9 January 1940; Patan, Bombay Presidency, British India
- Died: 14 June 2020 (aged 80); Mumbai, India
- Occupation: Businessman
- Known for: Co-founder of Rosy Blue
- Children: Russell Mehta

Arunkumar Ramniklal Mehta (9 January 1940 – 14 June 2020) was an Indian businessman, and head of the family-owned Belgian-Indian conglomerate Rosy Blue.

Arunkumar Mehta was born in Patan, Gujarat, Bombay Presidency, in January 1940, the son of Ramniklal Mehta, who was in the diamond business. He had two brothers, Harshad and Dilip, and one sister.

In 1960, he co-founded B. Arunkumar & Co. in Mumbai, with his maternal uncle Bhanuchandra Bhansali. His father, Ramniklal Mehta (1920-2002) and brother, Harshad joined the business at a later date.

This company later became Rosy Blue, and is ranked in the top five diamond companies of India.

In 1973, his brother Dilip Mehta set up Rosy Blue in Belgium.

In 2008, Dilip Mehta was CEO of Rosy Blue.

Arunkumar Mehta was chairman of Rosy Blue (India). He was a founder member of the Diamond Exporters Association Ltd, and its vice-president. He was a member of the managing committee of the Bharat Diamond Bourse. For 20 years he was a member of the managing committee of The Gem & Jewellery Export Promotion Council, who gave him a Lifetime Achievement Award in 2007.

His son Russell Mehta runs Rosy Blue (India) Pvt. Ltd.

Arunkumar Mehta died on 14 June 2020 at Sir H. N. Reliance Foundation Hospital, Girgaon, Mumbai, at the age of 80.
