= Arun Garg =

- Born: 1946 (age 79–80); Agra, India
- Education: Agra University; University of Regina; University of British Columbia
- Medical career
- Profession: doctor
- Field: pathology
- Institutions: Fraser Health; University of British Columbia; Dr. C. J. Coady Associates; British Columbia Medical Association; Institute of Health Care System Sustainability and Transformation
- Awards: Queen Elizabeth II Diamond Jubilee Medal, Dr. Don Rix Leadership award

Arun Garg (born 1946) is an Indo-Canadian physician in the province of British Columbia who is recognized for contributing linkages between Canada and India, his country of origin.

== Early life ==
Garg was born in the Indian city of Agra. His reputation for academic excellence started at an early age. When he was six years old, he entered school at a Grade 4 level. By age 16, he graduated from Agra University with a Master's in Chemistry. Being too young to enter medical school in India, Garg emigrated to the prairie province of Saskatchewan in Canada.

== Career in Canada ==
After earning a PhD in Biochemistry at the University of Regina in 1970, Garg graduated with a medical degree from the University of British Columbia in Vancouver in 1977. As a pathologist, he was a medical partner in Dr. C. J. Coady Associates from 1979-2011. He started as Medical Director of Lab Medicine and Pathology at Royal Columbian Hospital in 1997 and became the regional director after the hospital was merged into the Fraser Health region.

Garg's service at the British Columbia Medical Association (BCMA) included being a board member, board chair and president. As a member of the board for the Canadian Medical Association, he also chaired its Council on Health Policy and Economics and a task force which developed the position paper "Prescription for Sustainability" for presentation to the federal Royal Commission on the Future of Health Care in Canada.

After serving as a board member and chair from 1992-1999, Garg received an honorary doctorate from BCIT in 2010. In 2011, he received the BCMA's inaugural Don Rix Leadership Award. The Vancouver Sun newspaper listed him in 2008 as one of the 100 most influential Indo-Canadians in the province. Arun has received many other awards including Drishti award for leadership in Health services 2015, Lifetime achievement award of CAPIH. UBC department of Pathology awarded its highest honour offer lifetime service and awarded Dr Dave Hardwick service award in 2018. During the celebration of INDIA'S 75 YEARS, High Commission of India and Maneesh Media honored Arun in their 75 Jewels LIST in April 2022.

== Canada–India relations ==
In 2006, the provincial government appointed Garg as chair of the India Marketing Advisory Group that submitted a report to the Premier of British Columbia on how to improve trade relations with India.

Garg served as co-chair of the India Advisory Council for Simon Fraser University (SFU). Garg was a founding member of the Canadian Physicians with Interest in South Asia (PISA) of BC (1986) and Canadian Association of Physicians of Indian Heritage (2007).

With SFU health-sciences professor Arun Chockalingam, Garg also co-founded the Canada India Network Initiative (CINI) in 2010 to bring awareness to the issue of cardiovascular disease in the South Asian population. Two Canada-India Cardiovascular conferences were hosted by CINI in Surrey, British Columbia by 2014. About 10 per cent of the province's population is of South Asian descent which has a higher prevalence and seriousness of heart disease. Garg has promoted Indian traditions as both contributing or mitigating health risks. Yoga's breathing exercises may aid oxygenation while traditional diets may require moderation to obtain a healthy lifestyle. Canada India Network Society organized its 3rd CINI conference in June 2018. It was cohosted by Fraser Health and Simon Fraser University. Global Association of Physicians of Indian origin GAPIO used it as their mid year meeting and participated with strong support. The society continue to be active in building healthy society and organizing various network sessions, round tables and conferences. Each session dedicated to specific recommendations. Current focus is Integrative Care, fusion of best of east and best of west and incorporation total body, mind and intellect role in health. Full information is detailed on the web site of Canada India Network Society. www.thecins.org and www.gapio.org
