= Arun Pudur =

Indian businessman

- Born: Chennai, India
- Occupation: President of Celframe

Arun Pudur is the founder and group president of Celframe Corporation.

== Early life and education ==
Pudur was born in Chennai, but his family moved to Bengaluru, as his father used to stay 7 to 8 months a year there. His father, Sri Ranga, was a cinematographer. Pudur is a graduate of the University of Bangalore, majoring in Business Management.

== Career ==
Pudur founded Celframe in 2001.

Pudur has often claimed to be a highly successful entrepreneur, but a subsequent Forbes investigation could not confirm his claims.
