= Arun Pathak (Bihar politician) =

Arun Pathak has been an adviser to the Governor of Bihar since 19 May 2005. The President's rule was imposed there in March, 2005. He retired from the Indian Administrative Service in 1993. He was the chief secretary of Bihar twice. According to rediff.com, he was known for his honest image.

In May 2005, he was accused of being a loyalist of Lalu Prasad Yadav by The Times of India.
