= Arun Katiyar =

Indian journalist and media executive

Arun Katiyar is an Indian journalist, editor, media executive and writer. He worked with the India Today Group and later held roles at Radio City, Microland, SEraja and One97 Mobility Fund.

== Career ==
Katiyar worked as a journalist and editor with the India Today Group. He later served as station director of Radio City.

In 2004, Katiyar joined Microland as vice-president to lead its technical-support business. In 2005, he was chief executive officer of SEraja, a start-up developing an online event-information service known as EventWeb. In 2012, One97 Mobility Fund appointed Katiyar as a venture catalyst.

Katiyar has also written on technology and social-media developments, including a 2015 article in India Today.

== Writing and literary work ==
Katiyar co-authored Bombay: A Contemporary Account of Mumbai with Namas Bhojani. The book was published by Harper Collins Publishers India Pvt. Ltd. in 1996.

In 2023, he served on the nonfiction-prize jury of Tata Literature Live! The Mumbai LitFest.

== Cycling ==
Katiyar is a cyclist and was part of the team that established the Tour of Nilgiris in 2008. The event became a multi-day, non-competitive cycling tour in southern India. In 2009, NDTV identified him as a member of RideACycle Foundation, which organised the Tour of Nilgiris.
