= Arun Raha =

American economist

Arun Raha (born March 31, 1959) was, until January 31, 2012, the Executive Director and Chief Economist for the State of Washington, a position he took on September 2, 2008. He has a Ph.D. in Economics from Washington State University. He worked previously a Swiss Re in New York. He has also received national awards for his financial forecasting from the Federal Reserve Bank of Chicago, and from The Wall Street Journal.
