= 2000 New Year Honours (New Zealand) =

Annual awards for New Zealanders

- Previous: 1999 gallantry awards Next: 2000 Queen's Birthday Honours
- Type: New Zealand royal honours: Order of New Zealand; New Zealand Order of Merit; Queen's Service Order; Queen's Service Medal
- Date: 31 December 1999
- Country: New Zealand

Highlights
- Total recipients: 168

The 2000 New Year Honours in New Zealand were appointments by Elizabeth II in her right as Queen of New Zealand, on the advice of the New Zealand government, to various orders and honours to reward and highlight good works by New Zealanders, and to celebrate the passing of 1999 and the beginning of 2000. They were announced on 31 December 1999.

The recipients of honours are listed here as they were styled before their new honour.

== Order of New Zealand (ONZ) ==
Ordinary member

- The Right Honourable Michael Kenneth Moore – of Geneva, Switzerland.
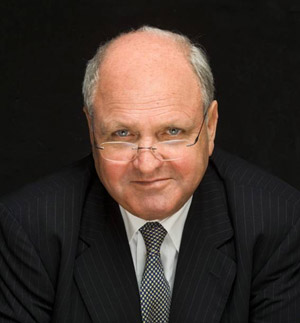
Mike Moore

== New Zealand Order of Merit ==
=== Dame Companion (DNZM) ===
- Professor Evelyn Mary Stokes – of Hamilton. For services to tertiary education and Māori.
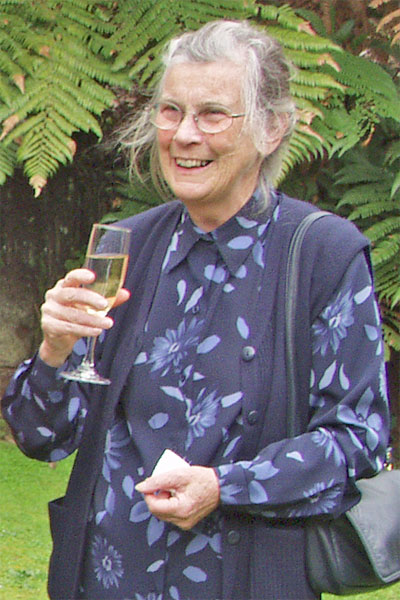
Dame Evelyn Stokes

=== Knight Companion (KNZM) ===
- The Honourable Rodney Gerald Gallen QC – of Hastings. For services as a judge of the High Court, 1983–1999.
- Patrick Hogan CBE – of Cambridge. For services to Thoroughbred breeding and racing.
- Gilbert Simpson QSM – of Christchurch. For services to information technology, commerce and the community.
- John Te Ahikaiata Joseph Turei CBE QSM – of Auckland. For services to Māori.
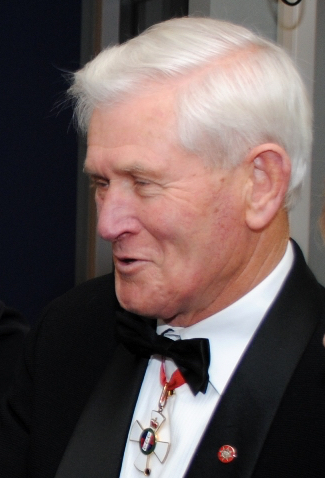
Sir Patrick Hogan

=== Companion (CNZM) ===
- Denis Frederick Adam OBE – of Wellington. For services to the arts and the community.
- Roy (James Robson) Cowan MBE – of Wellington. For services to pottery.
- Lawrence Karl Davidson – of Auckland. For services to yacht designing.
- Dr Mary Josephine (Joy) Drayton MBE – of Tauranga. For services to local government and the community.
- Eleanor Joan Ferner – of Wellington. For services to women and the community.
- George Gordon Henderson Gilmour – of Auckland. For services to business management and the community.
- Keith Neville Lewis – of London, United Kingdom. For services to opera.
- Joyce Little McIver JP – of Rangiora, North Canterbury. For services to the community.
- Robin Anthony McKenzie OBE – of Waikanae. For services to physiotherapy.
- Peter Heywood Malone OBE – of Richmond. For services to local government and the community.
- Dr Arthur Francis Small – of Wellington. For services to the transport industry and the community.
- Diggeress Rangituatahi Te Kanawa QSO – of Te Kūiti. For services to Māori arts and crafts.
- Maarten Laurens Wevers – of Wellington. For services to the 1999 APEC summit.
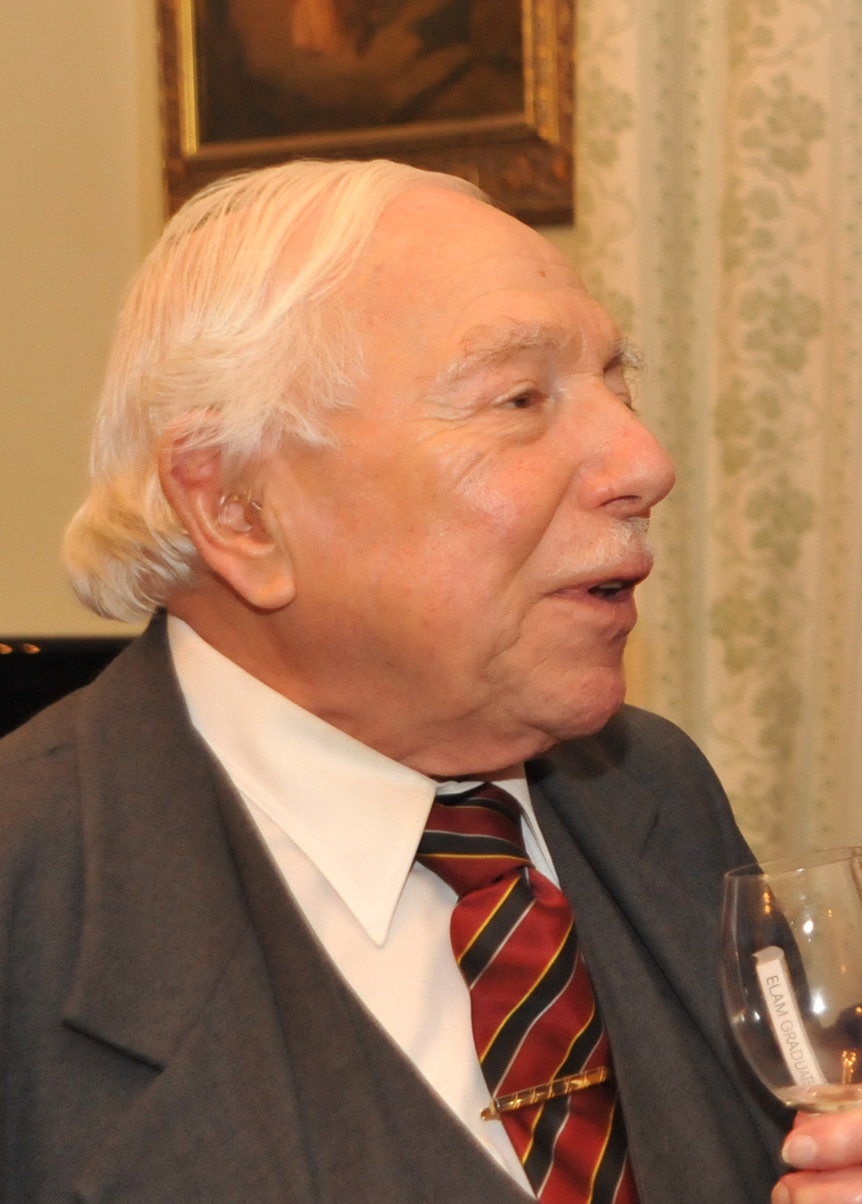
Denis Adam

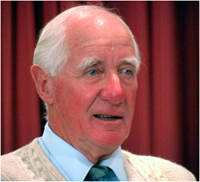
Robin McKenzie

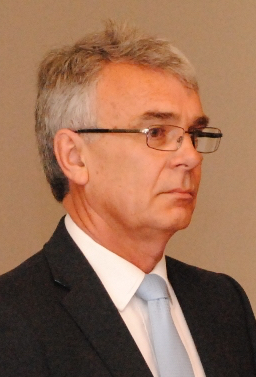
Maarten Wevers

=== Officer (ONZM) ===
- Dr Arthur John (Jock) Allison – of Dunedin. For services to agricultural science.
- Dr Edric Sargisson Baker – of Whakatāne. For services to humanitarian aid.
- Bryan Allen Bartley – of Auckland. For services to engineering and the community.
- Russell Joseph Beck – of Invercargill. For services to art and local history.
- Jeanette Broome – of Hamilton. For services to thoroughbred breeding.
- Associate Professor Bernard John Brown – of Auckland. For services to legal education.
- Michael Dawson Chrisp – of Gisborne. For services to the legal profession and the community.
- Roger Oakden Davies JP – of Kerikeri. For services to horticulture.
- Anthony Watson Grayburn JP – of Tokoroa. For services to forestry.
- May Millicent Greenslade – of Ashburton. For services to the community.
- Gloria Herbert – of Broadwood, Northland. For services to the community.
- Philip Peter Jensen – of Tauranga. For services to the dairy industry.
- Owen Marshall Jones – of Timaru. For services to literature.
- Dr Allen Liang – of Auckland. For services to medical research.
- Jeanette Lorraine McKechie – of Christchurch. For services to the Girls' Brigade.
- Donald George McLaren – of Auckland. For services to the animal health industry and racing.
- Emily Jean Mair (Mrs Simenauer) – of Wellington. For services to music and singing.
- Raymond Francis Parker – of Wellington. For services as Director of the Government Communications Security Bureau.
- Maxwell John Paynter – of Hastings. For services to horticulture.
- June Avis Robinson JP – of Hokitika. For services to conservation and the community.
- Donald Stanley Mackintosh Trott – of Auckland. For services to opera.
- Emeritus Professor Thomas William Walker – of Christchurch. For services to soil science.
- Marilynn Lois Webb – of Dunedin. For services to art and art education.
- Donald Edward Whiteman JP – of Upper Hutt. For services to the sport of rifle shooting.

Honorary

- Dr Vanchai Vatanasapt – of Khon Kaen, Thailand. For services to New Zealand interests in Thailand and to regional development.
- Rodney Harold Clinton Walshe – of Auckland. For services to tourism and the community.
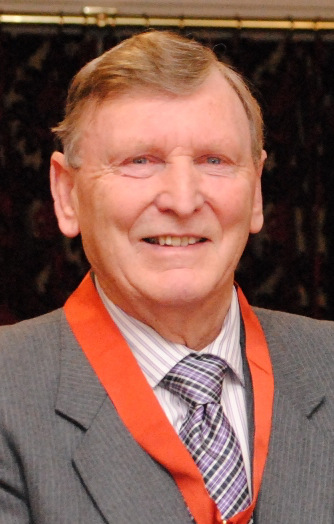
Owen Marshall

Don McLaren

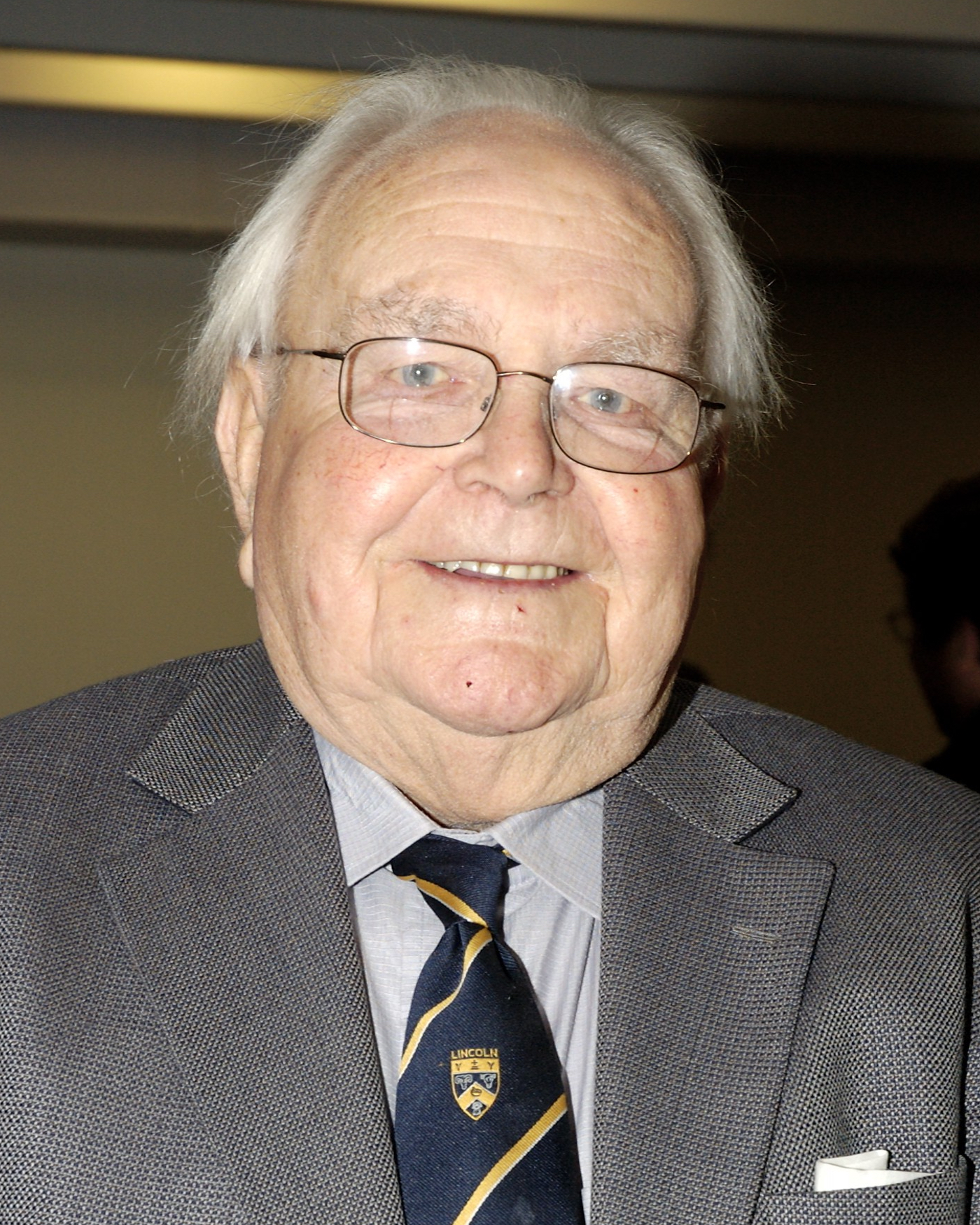
Tom Walker

=== Member (MNZM) ===
- Cathrine Rachel Aslin – of Wellington. For services to dance and the community.
- Janice Enid Barton – of Auckland. For services to the community.
- May Evelyn Doris Bell – of Dannevirke. For services to the community.
- Robert Tennyson Burstall – of Auckland. For services to recreational fishing.
- Jack Malfroy Butland – of Auckland. For services to the community.
- Lynette Corner – of Wellington. For services to the arts.
- Maurice Bayly de Lautour JP – of Takapau. For services to farming.
- Anthony Daniel Alexander Deavol – of Christchurch. For services to the community.
- Alison Mary Dowson – of Christchurch. For services to the community.
- Robin Lowrie Dunlop – of Queenstown. For services to Guides.
- John Edward Farry – of Dunedin. For services to the community.
- Sylvia Mary Ellen Fausett – of Auckland. For services to the community.
- Kenneth Ernest Findlay JP – of Waitakere City. For services to the community.
- John Tucker Gould – of Havelock North. For services to the baking industry and the community.
- John Gavin Gunn – of Canterbury. For services to agriculture.
- Stanley Allen Hill – of Morrinsville. For services to basketball.
- Maxine Beverly Hodgson – of Hamilton. For services to social work.
- Ian Bruce Irvine – of Whangārei. For services to the disabled.
- William John Kennedy – of Pollok, Waiuku. For services to the community.
- Brian Francis Kerridge JP – of Blenheim. For services to the community.
- Hamilton Manaia Pihopa Kingi – of Rotorua. For services to the community.
- Inez Haereata Kingi JP – of Rotorua. For services to the community.
- John Douglas Kirkwood – of Matamata. For services to the community.
- Robert Arthur Linton – of Auckland. For services to the community.
- Keith (Kwai Ock) Lowe – of Wellington. For services to horticulture and the community.
- Alison Muir McKenzie – of Helensville. For services to health administration.
- Patricia Nannette McMillan – of Wanganui. For services to the community.
- Allan Reginald Meredith JP – of Tūrangi. For services to local government and the community.
- Ada Maketu Mikaere – of Coromandel. For services to the community.
- Amelia Gertrude Bell Moffatt – of Kaikohe. For services to the community.
- Ian Freke Payne JP – of Auckland. For services to education.
- Chris Ironside Rasasingam Perinpanayagam – of Wellington. For services to the community.
- Alfred Potaka JP – of Porirua. For services to the community.
- John Graham Prince – of Christchurch. For services to croquet.
- Brian James Rudd JP – of New Plymouth. For services to the community.
- Lindsay Reid Shelton – of Wellington. For services to the film industry.
- David Rewi Pohatu Stone JP – of Paki Paki, Hastings. For services to Māori.
- Deirdre Elizabeth Anne Tarrant – of Wellington. For services to dance and the community.
- Te Kopa Tipene JP – of Kawakawa. For services to the community.
- Colin Joseph Warren – of Westport. For services to the community.
- Janice Eve Wenn – of Masterton. For services to nursing and the community.
- Christopher Sherratt White – of Hamilton. For services to rowing.
- Bernard Joseph Wood – of Porirua. For services to sport.
- Captain Robert Maxwell McKillop VRD – Royal New Zealand Naval Volunteer Reserve.
- Warrant Officer Michael O'Carroll – Royal New Zealand Navy.
- Master Air Loadmaster Gareth Frederick Shaw – Royal New Zealand Air Force.

Additional

- Major Douglas Bruce Vautier – Corps of Royal New Zealand Engineers.
- Flight Lieutenant Kavae Exham Tamariki – Royal New Zealand Air Force.
- Warrant Officer Class Two William Lloyd Schoch – Royal New Zealand Army Logistic Regiment.
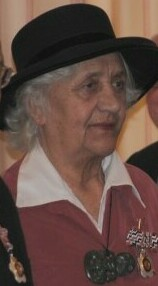
Inez Kingi

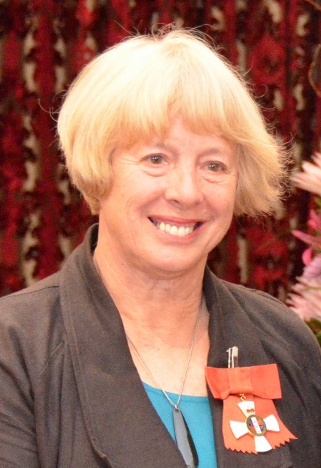
Deirdre Tarrant

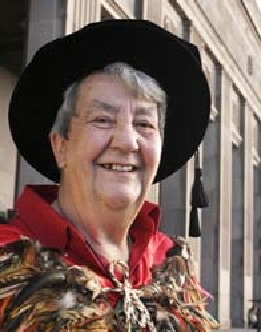
Janice Wenn

== Companion of the Queen's Service Order (QSO) ==
=== For community service ===
- Te Whero O Te Rangi Bailey – of Waitara.
- Jean Mary Haslam – of Tauranga.
- John Percival Johnstone – of Napier.
- Patricia Kaye Mark JP – of Dunedin.
- Esther Alexandrou Petritakis – of Wellington.
- Patricia Jessie Ross – of Auckland.
- The Very Reverend Tama He He Takao – of Whakatāne.
- Margaret Ruth de Laval Vosper – of Cambridge.

=== For public services ===
- The Honourable John Archibald Banks – of Auckland.
- Michael Frank Chilton – of Wellington.
- Dr Gillian Eileen Hamel – of Dunedin.
- The Honourable Denis William Anson Marshall – of Marton.
- Alison Mae Paterson – of Auckland.
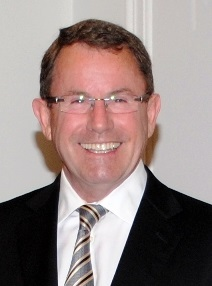
John Banks

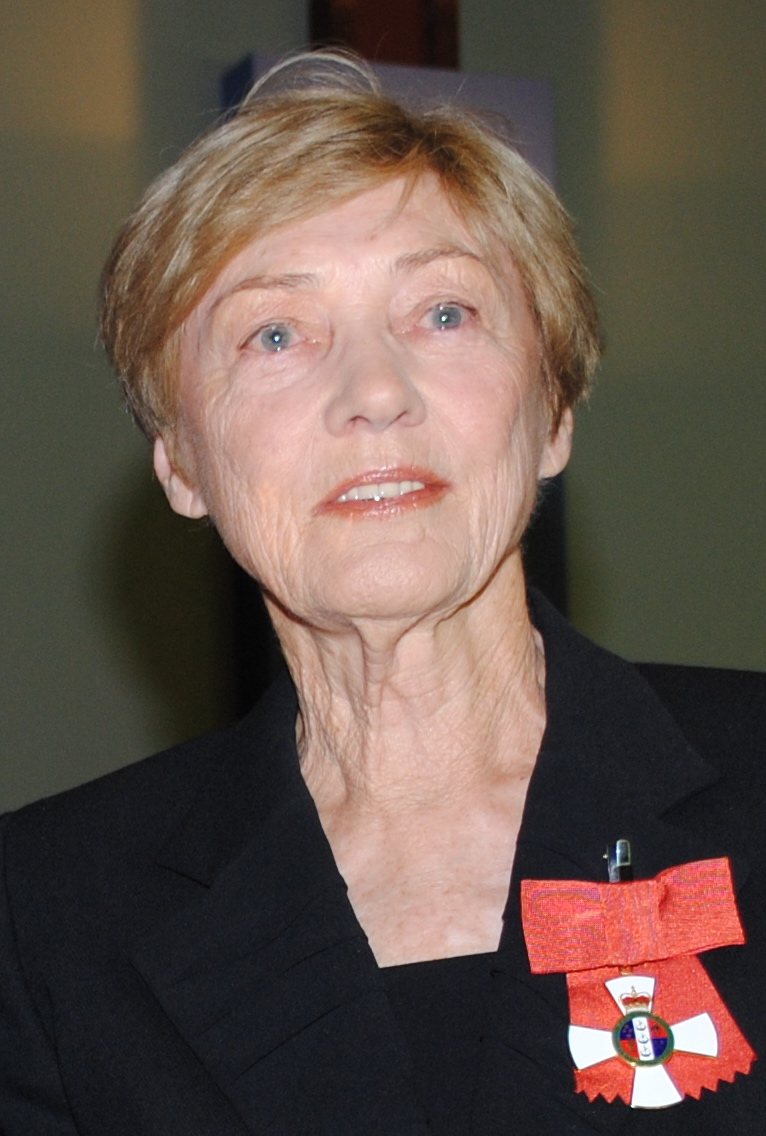
Alison Paterson

== Queen's Service Medal (QSM) ==
=== For community service ===
- Robin Bertram Astridge – of Cambridge.
- Honor Elizabeth Atwell JP – of Kaeo.
- Douglas Alexander Bloomfield JP – of Christchurch.
- Francis Verdon Brosnahan – of Timaru.
- Nga Tungaane Brown – of Waiouru.
- Esma Frances Gordon – of Auckland.
- Antoon Hendriks JP – of Auckland.
- Margaret Annie (Peggy) Higgins – of Napier.
- Catherine Alice Howman – of Christchurch.
- Judith Anne Irving – of Tapanui.
- Elaine Constance Lunken – of Auckland.
- Oliver Adolphus Newell Luxton – of Ashburton.
- Irene Janet McGregor JP – of Gore.
- Audrey May McKelvey – of Invercargill.
- Adrienne Manthel – of Porirua.
- Jeanette Patricia Mark – of Blenheim.
- Rhona Dawn Olesen – of Wellsford.
- Joy Mellanie Parkin – of Wellington.
- Willem Plessius – of Ngāruawāhia.
- Hine Manuhiri Poa – of Upper Hutt.
- Lewis Goff Rawiri – of Waimamaku.
- Ivan Harry Robb – of Pukekohe.
- Edna June Springer – of Wanganui.
- Colin Chapman Stevenson JP – of Tokomaru.
- Linda Mary Thornton – of Masterton.
- Robert Greenhalgh Walker – of Hamilton.
- Dorothy Janet Whorskey – of Hamilton.
- Diana Frances Willis – of Auckland.
- Hugh Petrie Willis – of Auckland.
- John Neville Wooderson JP – of Auckland.

=== For public services ===
- Sunny Iris Amey – of Paekākāriki.
- Ian Hector Braggins – of Auckland; chief fire safety officer, Auckland Fire Region, New Zealand Fire Service.
- Josephine Isabel Cooper – of Dunedin.
- Mary Isobell Cumming – of Dunedin.
- Judith Creagh Davies – of Christchurch.
- Philip Matthew Deazley – of Greymouth; lately senior sergeant, New Zealand Police.
- Ellen Agnes Doyle – of Christchurch.
- Arthur John Dunn – of Puhoi.
- Valerie Francis Dunn – of Puhoi.
- Doris Margaret Ferry – of Raumati South.
- Violet Otene Harris – of Ōkaihau.
- The Reverend Kimi Ngatamariki Henry – of Invercargill.
- James Joseph Hodges – of Geraldine.
- Daphne Annette Hull – of Alexandra.
- Colin Leslie Kirby – of Christchurch.
- Mere Karaka Te Rerehorua Knight – of Auckland.
- Ronald Walter Ladd JP – of Hamilton.
- Murray John Leadley – of Oamaru.
- Wayne Kelvin Le Haavre – of Auckland.
- Peter Kenneth Lockery – of Wellington; chief fire officer, Tawa Volunteer Fire Brigade, New Zealand Fire Service.
- Robert Neill McConnell JP – of Te Araroa.
- Diane Jean Martin – of Martinborough.
- Ann Patricia Motutere – of Hamilton.
- Hugh Alexander Muldrew – of Hampden.
- Parekura Te Rua Pohatu Newman JP – of Gore.
- James Desmond Stephens – of Tauranga, fire region commander, Bay-Waikato Fire Region, New Zealand Fire Service.
- Paula Margaret Stevens – of Christchurch, inspector, New Zealand Police.
- Grant Clarence Tullock – of Taupō, senior constable, New Zealand Police.
- Lewis William Wadsworth JP – of Renwick.
- Amor George Walter – of Levin.
- Herbert Eoin Wimsett JP – of Wellington.
