= Ken Adam =

German-British production designer and military pilot (1921–2016)

Sir Ken Adam OBE RDI
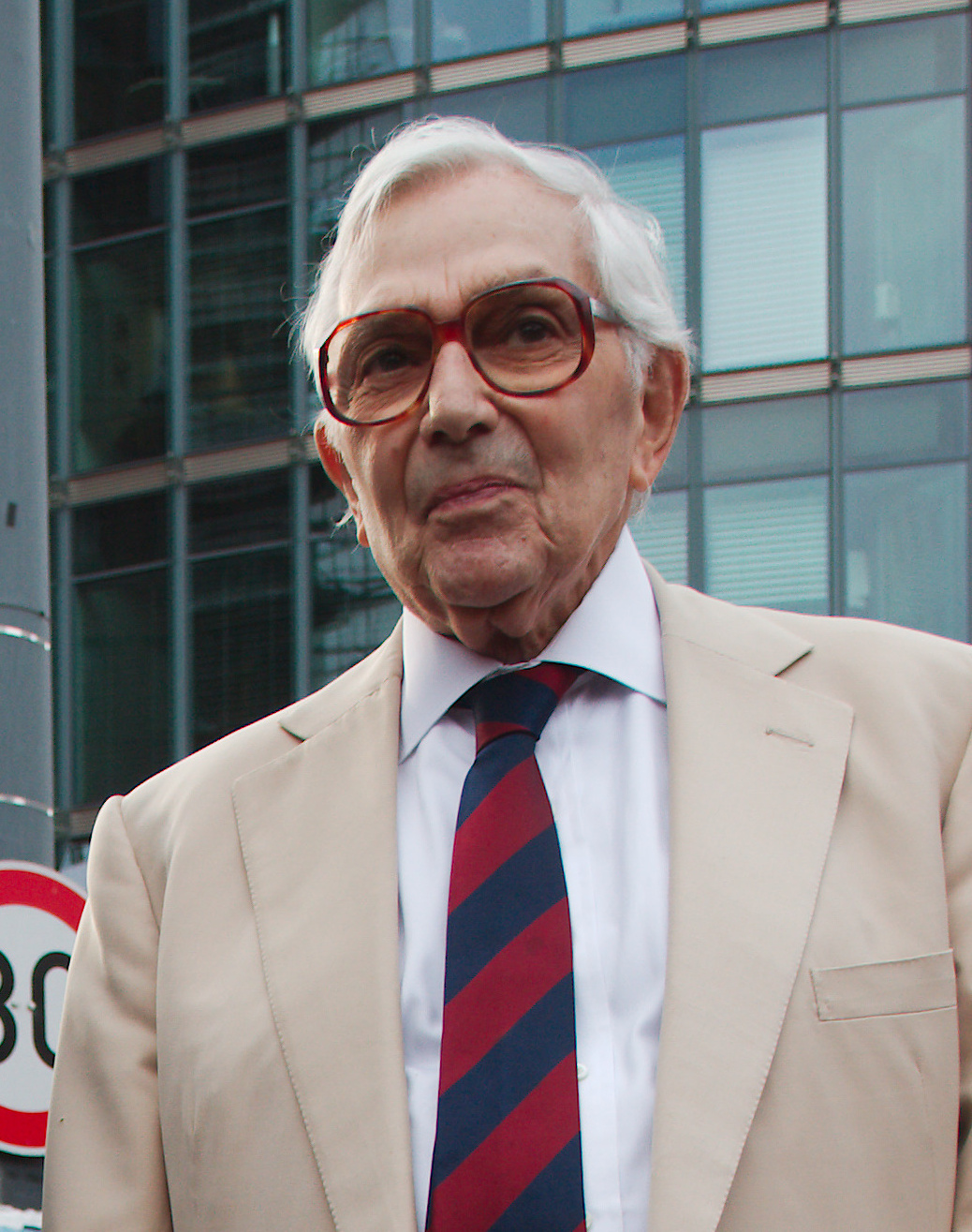
- Adam in 2012
- Born: Klaus Hugo George Fritz Adam; 5 February 1921; Berlin, Germany
- Died: 10 March 2016 (aged 95); London, England
- Education: St Paul's School, London; University College London
- Years active: 1940–2003
- Known for: Royal Air Force pilot, production designer
- Spouse: Maria-Letizia Moauro (m. 1952)
- Relatives: Denis Adam (brother)
- Awards: BAFTA for Dr. Strangelove (1964); BAFTA for The IPCRESS File (1965); Academy Award for Barry Lyndon (1975); Academy Award for The Madness of King George (1994)
- Military career
- Allegiance: United Kingdom
- Branch: Royal Air Force
- Service years: 1941–1947
- Rank: Flight lieutenant
- Service number: 187137
- Unit: No. 609 Squadron
- Conflicts: World War II

Signature
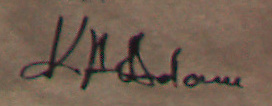

Sir Kenneth Adam OBE RDI (born Klaus Hugo George Fritz Adam; 5 February 1921 – 10 March 2016) was a German-British production designer for motion pictures and a Royal Air Force pilot. He was known for his set designs for the James Bond films of the 1960s and 1970s, and his collaborations with director Stanley Kubrick on Dr. Strangelove (1964) and Barry Lyndon (1975). He won two Academy Awards for Best Art Direction (out of five total nominations) and two BAFTA Awards for Best Production Design (out of nine).

Born in Berlin, Adam relocated to England with his Jewish family at the age of 13 soon after the Nazis came to power. Together with his younger brother, Denis Adam, he was one of only three German-born pilots to serve in the Royal Air Force during the Second World War, serving as a fighter pilot in No. 609 and No. 183 squadrons.

== Early life ==
Adam was born Klaus Adam in 1921 in Berlin to an upper-middle-class secular Jewish family, the third child of Lilli (née Saalfeld) and Fritz Adam, a former Prussian cavalry officer who had served with the Zieten Hussars. Fritz had been awarded the Iron Cross Second Class and the Iron Cross First Class for his service in the First World War.

Fritz co-owned a well-known high-fashion clothing and sporting goods store called S. Adam (Berlin, Leipziger Straße/Friedrichstraße) together with his three brothers, George, Siegfried and Otto Adam. The company had been established in 1863 by Saul Adam. Klaus (Ken) had two older siblings, Peter, Loni and a younger brother Dieter (1 February 1924 – 17 October 2018).

The family lived an almost idyllic, privileged existence until the Nazi Party came to power.

His older brother Peter was good friends with Gottfried Reinhardt the son of theatre and film director Max Reinhardt and they would often take the young Klaus out with them. As a result, he got to know Max Reinhardt and many other people in the German theatre. Gottfried Reinhardt later became a film director and producer.

=== England ===
The combination of his brother Dieter at the age of nine having a fight with a playground bully wearing a Hitler Youth uniform and the increasing discrimination against Jews convinced their parents to send Klaus and Dieter to Craigend Park boarding school in Edinburgh. Upon arrival Klaus anglicised his name to Kenneth and eventually Ken while his brother Dieter changed his to Denis. Their oldest brother Peter was at the time studying law at the University of Clermont-Ferrand in France and decided to move to England and complete his studies there.

The rest of the family stayed in Germany, as Adam's father felt that the Nazis were only a temporary aberration and they could wait it out. Things, however, continued to deteriorate, with Jewish stores being boycotted and targeted for attacks in April 1933.

In the summer of 1933, Max Reich, a senior employee of the family business, and then Fritz Adam were arrested. Reich was a member of the SS and leader of the business's Nazi cell. Reich was eventually released, and Fritz Adam was released and put under house arrest for three days. Inquiries determined that a former employee who had been dismissed for dishonesty had accused the two men of unfair dismissal and conspiring to maintain undeclared funds in Switzerland. It took two weeks to disprove both allegations, and no charges were laid against either man. Reluctantly coming to the conclusion that Jews had no future in Germany, Fritz, Lilli and Loni, as well as some of Ken's aunts and uncles, fled to England in the summer of 1934. The family eventually settled in the Hampstead area of London the following year.

The family were declared refugees on their arrival to England and identified as "friendly aliens", with the exception of Denis who was too young to be classified. The family arrived in England with nothing other than some gold coins Lilli had smuggled out. His mother, who had never previously worked in her life, used the little money they had to establish and run a boarding house. His father struggled with his change in status and starting over in a new country. His father started an import-export business selling gloves, but his health deteriorated and he died in 1936 when he was 56 years old.

Adam left the boarding school in Edinburgh to rejoin his parents in London and continued his education at St. Paul's School in London. At his mother's boarding house, Adam became increasingly interested in cinema after coming into contact with a number of artists among the Jewish refugees who were boarding there. He was introduced to Vincent Korda, a Hungarian art director, when he was working on Knight Without Armour at Denham Film Studios. Korda not only nurtured Adam's passion for films, but encouraged him to train as an architect if he was interested in becoming a production designer. Leaving school he became an apprentice at the firm of CW Glover & Partners (which specialized in making bomb shelters) and he signed up for evening classes at the Bartlett School of Architecture at University College London. Among his tutors was a part-time teacher, who had been an assistant of famed German architect Erich Mendelsohn, from whom Adam learned valuable architectural drawing techniques.

== World War II ==
When World War II began, Adam was working on designs for air-raid shelters and illustrated books on air-raid protection and gas masks. As German citizens, the Adam family could have been interned as enemy aliens, but in October 1940 Adam was able to join the Pioneer Corps, a support unit of the British Army open to citizens of Axis countries resident in the UK and other Commonwealth countries, provided they were not considered a risk to security. Adam was seconded to design bomb shelters.

After eight months service in the Pioneer Corps, Adam's application to join the Royal Air Force Volunteer Reserve as a pilot was accepted. After initial flight training on de Havilland Tiger Moth biplanes in Scotland, he was sent to Canada and the United States for additional training. Among his instructors was the British actor Michael Rennie.

Flight Lieutenant Adam joined No. 609 Squadron at RAF Lympne on 1 October 1943. He was nicknamed "Heinie the tank-buster" by his comrades for his daring exploits. The squadron flew the Hawker Typhoon, initially in support of United States Army Air Forces long-range bombing missions over Europe. Later they were employed in support of ground troops, including at the battle of the Falaise Gap, in Normandy after D-Day. In 1944, his brother Denis joined No. 183 Squadron, joining Adam in No. 123 Wing. There were four squadrons in the wing: 164, 183, 198 and 609.

Together with his brother Denis, Adam was one of three German-born pilots to serve in the Royal Air Force during the Second World War, the third being Peter Stevens. As such, if they had been captured by the Germans, they were liable to be executed as traitors rather than being treated as prisoners of war.

Following the end of the war, Adam was the Allied officer in charge of German labour rebuilding Wunstorf Air Base. Adam became naturalised as a British subject on 27 December 1946 and left the RAF upon his demobilisation in 1947.

== Film career ==
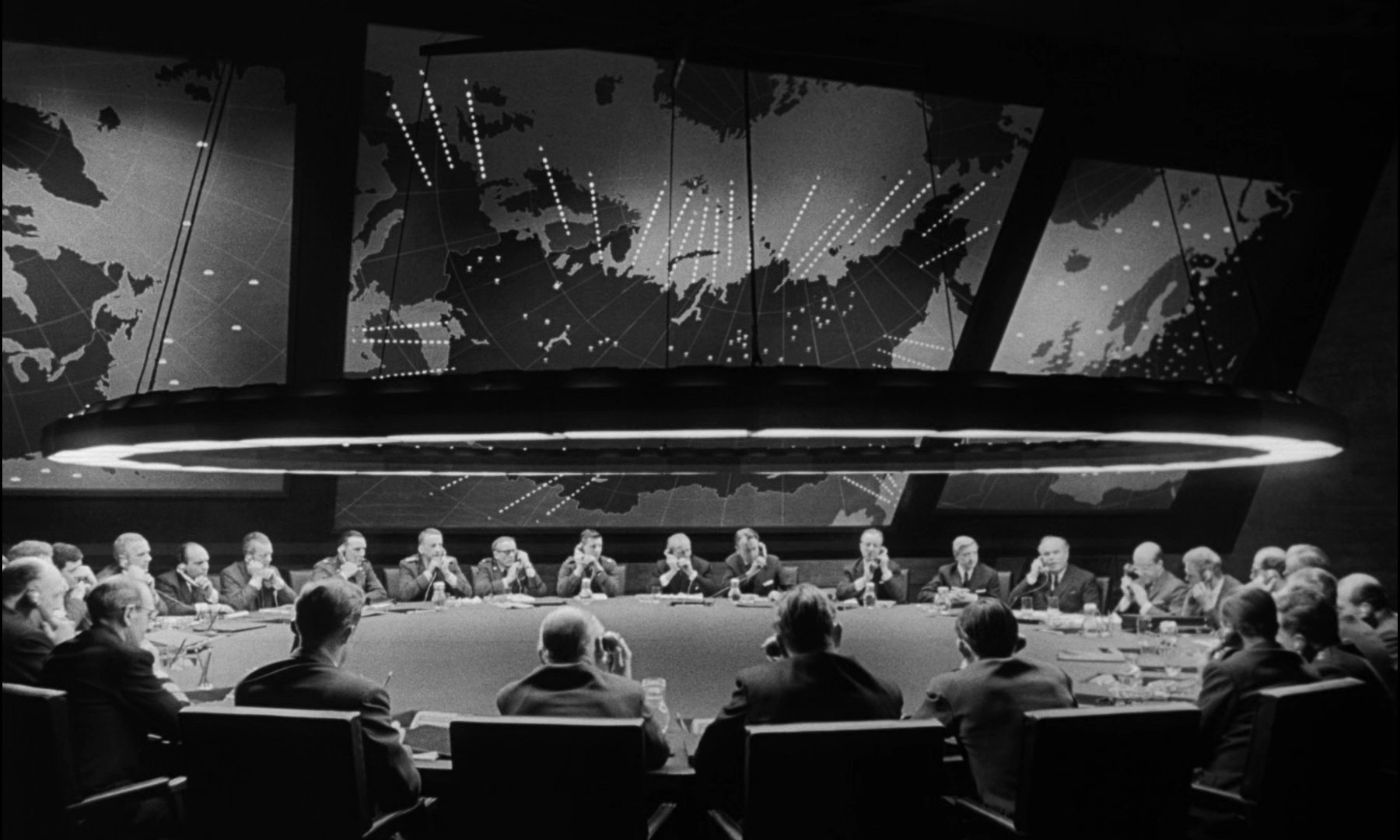
Adam designed the War Room set for Dr. Strangelove (1964).

Adam entered the film industry as a draughtsman on This Was a Woman (1948) at Riverside Studios in Hammersmith. Working for art director Paul Sheriff on the Burt Lancaster film The Crimson Pirate (1952), Adam designed an 18th-century hot-air balloon, a flame-throwing tank, and a rowing boat that transformed into a submarine. His first major screen credit was as production designer on the British thriller Soho Incident (1956). He worked (uncredited) on the epics Around the World in 80 Days (also 1956) and Ben-Hur (1959). In 1956, he assisted art director Edward Carrere with the sets for Helen of Troy.

His first major credit was for the horror film Night of the Demon (1957), directed by Jacques Tourneur, and he was also the production designer on several films directed by Robert Aldrich. The first public knowledge of his expertise came when he won an award for the sets of The Trials of Oscar Wilde at the Moscow Film Festival in 1960.

He was hired for the first James Bond film, Dr. No (1962). Adam did not work on the second James Bond film, From Russia with Love (1963), because he was working on Stanley Kubrick's Dr. Strangelove (1964). His work on this film was described by the British Film Institute (BFI) as "gleaming and sinister". Steven Spielberg called it "the best set that's ever been designed". He turned down the opportunity to work on Kubrick's next project, 2001: A Space Odyssey (1968), after he found out that Kubrick had been working with NASA for a year on space exploration, and that it would put him at a disadvantage in developing his art.

Adam made his name with his innovative, semi-futuristic sets for further James Bond films, such as Goldfinger (1964), Thunderball (1965), You Only Live Twice (1967), and Diamonds Are Forever (1971). The supertanker set for The Spy Who Loved Me (1977) was constructed in the largest soundstage in the world at the time. Adam claims it was lit by Stanley Kubrick in secret. His last Bond film was Moonraker (1979). Writing for The Guardian in 2005, journalist Johnny Dee claimed: "His sets for the seven Bond films he worked on [...] are as iconic as the movies themselves and set the benchmark for every blockbuster".

Adam's other film credits include The Trials of Oscar Wilde (1960), the Michael Caine espionage thriller The Ipcress File (1965) and its sequel Funeral in Berlin (1966), the Peter O'Toole version of Goodbye, Mr. Chips (1969), Sleuth (1972), Salon Kitty (1976), Agnes of God (1985), Addams Family Values (1993), and The Madness of King George (1994). He was also a visual consultant on the film version of Pennies from Heaven (1981), adapted from Dennis Potter's television serial.

Adam returned to work with Kubrick on Barry Lyndon (1975), for which he won his first Oscar. The BFI noted the film's "contrastingly mellow Technicolor beauties" in its depiction of the 18th century. He also designed the famous car for the film Chitty Chitty Bang Bang (1968), which was produced by the same team as the James Bond film series. During the late 1970s, he worked on storyboards and concept art for Star Trek: Planet of the Titans, then in pre-production. The film was eventually shelved by Paramount Pictures.

Adam was a jury member at the 1980 Cannes Film Festival and the 49th Berlin International Film Festival. In 1999, during the Victoria and Albert Museum exhibition "Ken Adam – Designing the Cold War", Adam spoke on his role in the design of film sets associated with the 1960s through the 1980s.

== Honours ==
Adam was appointed an Officer of the Order of the British Empire in the 1996 New Year Honours for services to the film industry and Knight Bachelor in the 2003 Birthday Honours for services to film production design and to UK–German relations. He received the 2008 Lucky Strike Designer Award, and was appointed a Royal Designer for Industry in 2009.

== Personal life ==
He met his wife Maria-Letizia Moauro while filming The Crimson Pirate on location on the Italian island of Ischia and they married on 16 August 1952.

=== Death ===
Adam died on 10 March 2016 at his home in Knightsbridge, London, following a short illness. He was 95 years old.

== Legacy ==
In September 2012, Adam handed over his entire body of work to the Deutsche Kinemathek. The Ken Adam collection comprises approximately 4,000 sketches for films from all periods, photo albums to individual films, storyboards of his employees, memorabilia, military medals, and identity documents, as well as all cinematic awards, including Adam's two Academy Awards.

The Ken Adam Building, a large lot at Pinewood Studios's Buckingham location, bears Adam's name and houses multiple theatres and businesses as well as the Kodak Film Lab and an office of the trade union Bectu.

== Filmography ==
=== Film ===
Year	Title	Contribution	Notes
1948	This Was a Woman	Draughtsman	
1948	Brass Monkey	Draughtsman	Uncredited
1949	Third Time Lucky	Draughtsman	Uncredited
1949	The Queen of Spades	Draughtsman	Uncredited
1949	Dick Barton Strikes Back	Assistant Art Director	Uncredited
1949	Obsession	Assistant Art Director	Uncredited
1949	Golden Arrow	Draughtsman	Uncredited
1950	Your Witness	Assistant Art Director	Uncredited
1951	Captain Horatio Hornblower	Associate Art Director	Uncredited
1952	The Crimson Pirate	Associate Art Director	
1953	The Master of Ballantrae	Assistant Art Director	Uncredited
1953	The Intruder	Assistant Art Director	Uncredited
1954	Star of India	Assistant Art Director	Credited as 'Kenneth Adams'
1956	Helen of Troy	Assistant Art Director	
1956	Around the World in 80 Days	Art Director: England	
1956	Soho Incident	Art Director	
1956	Child in the House	Art Director	
1956	Soho Incident	Production Designer	
1957	The Devil's Pass	Art Director	Credited as 'Kenneth Adam'
1957	Night of the Demon	Production Designer	
1958	Battle of the V-1	Set Designs	
1958	Gideon's Day	Art Director	
1959	Ben-Hur	Assistant Art Director	Uncredited
1959	The Angry Hills	Production Designer	
1959	Ten Seconds to Hell	Art Director	
1959	Beyond This Place	Art Director	
1959	The Rough and the Smooth	Production Designer/Art Director	
1960	In the Nick	Art Director	
1960	Let's Get Married	Production Designer	
1960	The Trials of Oscar Wilde	Production Designer	
1962	Sodom and Gomorrah	Production Designer	
1962	Dr. No	Production Designer	
1963	In the Cool of the Day	Production Designer	Credited as 'Kenneth Adam'
1964	Goldfinger	Production Designer	
1964	Dr. Strangelove or: How I Learned to Stop Worrying and Love the Bomb	Production Designer	
1964	Woman of Straw	Production Designer	
1965	Thunderball	Production Designer	
1965	The Ipcress File	Production Designer	
1966	Funeral in Berlin	Production Designer	
1967	You Only Live Twice	Production Designer	
1968	Chitty Chitty Bang Bang	Production Designer	
1969	Goodbye, Mr. Chips	Production Designer	
1970	The Owl and the Pussycat	Design Supervisor	
1971	Diamonds are Forever	Production Designer	
1972	Sleuth	Production Designer	
1973	The Last of Sheila	Production Designer	
1975	Barry Lyndon	Production Designer	
1976	The Seven-Per-Cent Solution	Production Designer	
1976	Salon Kitty	Production Designer	
1977	The Spy Who Loved Me	Production Designer	
1979	Moonraker	Production Designer	
1981	Pennies from Heaven	Visual Consultant/Associate Producer	
1985	King David	Production Designer	
1985	Agnes of God	Production Designer	
1986	Crimes of the Heart	Production Designer	
1988	The Deceivers	Production Designer	
1989	Dead Bang	Production Designer	
1990	The Freshman	Production Designer	
1991	The Doctor	Production Designer	
1991	Company Business	Production Designer	
1993	Undercover Blues	Production Designer	
1993	Addams Family Values	Production Designer	
1994	The Madness of King George	Production Designer	
1995	Boys on the Side	Production Designer	
1996	Bogus	Production Designer	
1997	In & Out	Production Designer	
1999	The Out-of-Towners	Production Designer	
2001	Taking Sides	Production Designer	

=== Video games ===
Year	Title	Contribution	Notes
2004	GoldenEye: Rogue Agent	Production Designer	

== Awards and nominations ==
Award	Year	Category	Work	Result	Ref.
Academy Awards	1957	Best Art Direction-Set Decoration, Color	Around the World in 80 Days	Nominated	
Academy Awards	1976	Best Art Direction-Set Decoration	Barry Lyndon	Won	
Academy Awards	1978	Best Art Direction-Set Decoration	The Spy Who Loved Me	Nominated	
Academy Awards	1994	Best Art Direction-Set Decoration	Addams Family Values	Nominated	
Academy Awards	1995	Best Art Direction-Set Decoration	The Madness of King George	Won	
Art Directors Guild	2002	Lifetime Achievement Award		Won	
Art Directors Guild	2013	Contribution to Cinematic Imagery Award	James Bond franchise	Won	
Art Directors Guild	2018	Art Directors Guild Hall of Fame		Won	
British Academy Film Awards	1965	Best British Art Direction (B/W)	Dr. Strangelove or: How I Learned to Stop Worrying and Love the Bomb	Won	
British Academy Film Awards	1965	Best British Art Direction (Colour)	Goldfinger	Nominated	
British Academy Film Awards	1966	Best British Art Direction (Colour)	The Ipcress File	Won	
British Academy Film Awards	1966	Best British Art Direction (Colour)	Thunderball	Nominated	
British Academy Film Awards	1968	Best British Art Direction (Colour)	You Only Live Twice	Nominated	
British Academy Film Awards	1974	Best Art Direction	Sleuth	Nominated	
British Academy Film Awards	1976	Best Art Direction	Barry Lyndon	Nominated	
British Academy Film Awards	1978	Best Production Design	The Spy Who Loved Me	Nominated	
British Academy Film Awards	1996	Best Production Design	The Madness of King George	Nominated	
London Design Festival	2015	Lifetime Achievement Medal		Won	
