= Bryan Bartley =

New Zealand civil engineer and inventor (1928–2015)

Bryan Bartley ONZM
- Born: Bryan Allen Bartley; 30 November 1928; Epsom, Auckland, New Zealand
- Died: 24 March 2015 (aged 86); Mount Eden, Auckland, New Zealand
- Education: Auckland University College
- Known for: Invention of the Barmac crusher

Bryan Allen Bartley ONZM (30 November 1928 – 24 March 2015) was a New Zealand civil engineer and inventor. He developed the Barmac crusher with fellow engineer Jim Macdonald.

== Early life and family ==
Born in the Auckland suburb of Epsom in 1928, Bartley was the second son of Wilma Amy (née Slattery) and George Frederick Bartley, a pharmacist. He studied civil engineering at Auckland University College, graduating with a Bachelor of Engineering in 1950 or 1953.

== Career ==
After graduating with a degree in engineering, Bartley worked at the City Engineer's Office for Auckland City Council. Bartley was employed by Winstone Aggregates and in the 1960s was instrumental in that company purchasing what is now its main quarry, Hunua Quarry near Papakura. He was one of the founders of the New Zealand branch of the Institute of Quarrying, and in 1989 served as the Institute of Quarrying's first international president. Initially working at Winstone for nine years, Bartley spent two years working for Gammon Construction in Malaysia, returning to Winstone from 1963, eventually becoming the general manager and working at the company for a further 22 years.

In 1970, Wellington engineer Jim Macdonald built the prototype for a new vertical shaft impactor for creating construction aggregate. Over a period of eight years, Bartley and Macdonald developed the prototype into a viable commercial machine that became known as the Barmac crusher after its two creators. The pair licensed the manufacture of their crusher around the world, and sold the business in 1994. By 2003 over 3500 Barmac crushers had been sold worldwide, the largest rated at 800 kW, and it has been used on projects including the Three Gorges Dam in China. The original Barmac crusher, machine number 1, is preserved at the Kiwi Point Quarry in Ngauranga Gorge, Wellington.

Bartley also developed and patented a new self-feathering yacht propeller with John Blundell.

In the 2000 New Year Honours, Bartley was appointed an Officer of the New Zealand Order of Merit, for services to engineering and the community.
