= Fausett =

Fausett is a surname. Notable people with the surname include:

- Buck Fausett (1908–1994), American baseball player and manager
- Dean Fausett (1913–1998), American painter, brother of Lynn
- Lynn Fausett (1894–1977), American painter
- Sylvia Fausett (1933–2024), New Zealand community leader
