= Denis Adam =

New Zealand businessman

Denis Adam CNZM OBE
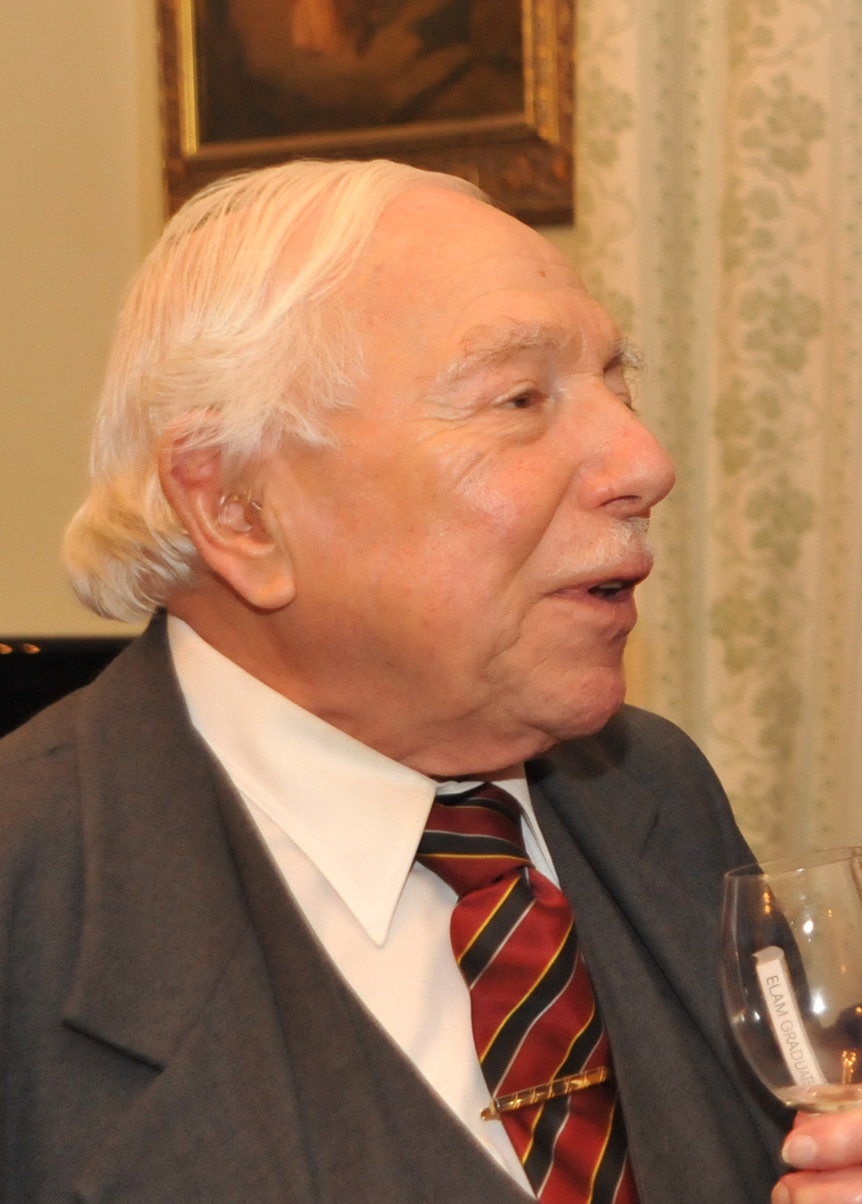
- Adam in 2010
- Born: Dieter Frederick Adam; 1 February 1924; Berlin, Germany
- Died: 17 October 2018 (aged 94); Wellington, New Zealand
- Occupation: Businessman
- Known for: Philanthropy
- Spouse: Verna Finlayson (m. 1953)
- Relatives: Ken Adam (brother)
- Military career
- Allegiance: United Kingdom
- Branch: Royal Air Force
- Service years: 1944–1946
- Unit: No. 183 Squadron
- Conflicts: Second World War

Denis Frederick Adam CNZM OBE (born Dieter Frederick Adam; 1 February 1924 – 17 October 2018) was a New Zealand businessman and patron of the arts.

Born in Berlin, he relocated to England with his Jewish family at a young age soon after the Nazis came to power, and together with his brother Ken Adam was one of very few German-born pilots to serve in the British Royal Air Force during the Second World War. After the end of the war, he migrated to New Zealand, where he established himself as a successful insurance broker and arts patron.

== Early life and education ==
Denis Adam was born in Berlin to an upper-middle-class secular Jewish family, the youngest child of Lilli (née Saalfeld) and Fritz Adam, a former Prussian cavalry officer who had served with the Zieten Hussars. Fritz had been awarded the Iron Cross Second Class and the Iron Cross First Class for his service in the First World War.

Fritz co-owned a well-known high-fashion clothing and sporting goods store with his three brothers called S. Adam (Berlin, Leipziger Straße/Friedrichstraße). The company had been established in 1863 by Saul Adam. Denis had three older siblings: Peter, Loni, and Klaus Hugo "Ken" Adam (5 February 1921 – 10 March 2016).

The family lived an almost idyllic, privileged existence until the Nazi Party came to power.

== England ==
While attending the College Francis, Denis at the age of nine had a fight with a playground bully wearing a Hitler Youth uniform, who was older and bigger than him. This fight and the increasing discrimination against Jews convinced Denis's parents to send him and Klaus to Craigend Park Boarding School in Edinburgh, Scotland. Upon arrival, his brother Klaus anglicised his name to Kenneth and eventually Ken. Their oldest brother Peter was at the time studying law at the University of Clermont-Ferrand in France and decided to move to England and complete his studies there.

The rest of the Adam family stayed in Germany as Denis's father felt that the Nazi's were only a temporary aberration and they would wait it out. Things however continued to deteriorate with Jewish stores being boycotted and targeted for attacks in April 1933.

During the summer of 1933, Max Reich, a senior employee of the family business, was arrested; soon after, Fritz Adam was also arrested. Reich was a member of the SS and leader of the business's Nazi cell. Reich was eventually released, and Fritz was released and put under house arrest for three days. Inquiries determined that a former employee who had been dismissed for dishonesty had accused the two men of unfair dismissal and conspiring to maintain undeclared funds in Switzerland. It took two weeks to disprove both allegations, and no charges were laid against either man. Now reluctantly coming to the conclusion that Jews had no future in Germany, Fritz, Lilli, and Loni, as well as some of Denis's aunts and uncles, fled to England in the summer of 1934. They eventually settled in the Hampstead area of London the following year.

After a year as a boarder, Denis left Edinburgh and came to London to live with his family. Once in London, he began attending St Paul's School as a day boy. Of the extended family that remained in Germany, six uncles and aunts of Adam were killed in Nazi concentration camps. The family were declared refugees on their arrival to England and identified as "friendly aliens" with the exception of Denis, who was too young to be classified. The family arrived in England with nothing other than some gold coins his mother smuggled out. His mother, who had never previously worked in her life, used the little money they had to establish and run a boarding house. His father struggled with his change in status and starting over in a new country. His father started an import/export business selling gloves, but his health deteriorated, and he died in 1936 when he was 56 years old and Denis was just 11. After leaving school, Denis obtained a loan from the Jewish Education Aid Society and studied accountancy for a year before obtaining a job in a small insurance broker called Leroi Flesch & Co.

== Second World War ==
When the Second World War broke out in 1939, the government declared that all those of Austrian or German nationality over the age of 16 who hadn't been screened should be interned. Denis had been too young to be screened when he had arrived in the country and, as a result, soon after his 16th birthday was arrested and spent a month incarcerated on the Isle of Man. Due to the efforts of his mother and brothers, he was released after four weeks.

When he turned 17, Denis volunteered with his mother's permission to join the Royal Air Force. He wanted to be a pilot and had the option to either immediately commence as ground crew or start pilot training when he reached the minimum age for flying duties of 18¼ years. As his brother Ken advised him that it would be difficult to transfer from ground crew to pilot training, he opted to stay home on leave until he reached the required age. During this time, he completed his accountancy studies but didn't get a degree as he needed another year's study.

In 1942, Adam was sent to Rhodesia for pilot training. Here he learned to fly Tiger Moth biplanes and Harvards. Once he got his wings he was stationed to Port Tufic in Egypt and then to Augusta in Sicily before being posted to England. Once in England, after refresher training at Worcester, he went to an Advanced Flying Training School (AFTS), then to an Operational Training Unit (OTU) to learn to fly Spitfires and then to a Conversion Unit where he learnt to fly Hawker Typhoon before being posted to Holland in 1944 to No. 183 Squadron, No. 123 Wing.

His brother Ken had been serving in No. 609 Squadron of the same wing since October 1943, and he used an old King's Regulation to request that Denis be assigned to the same wing. There were four squadrons in the wing: 164, 183, 198, and 609.

Together with his brother, he was one of very few German-born pilots to serve in the British Royal Air Force during the Second World War. Others were Peter Stevens (RAF officer) (born Georg Franz Hein) and Michael Kerr. As such, if they had been captured by the Germans, they were liable to execution as a traitor, rather than being treated as a prisoner of war.

== Immigration to New Zealand ==
After the end of the war in Europe, the squadron was sent to England and was re-equipped with Tempest IIs in preparation for its deployment to the Asia theatre of operations. Before this deployment could happen the war with Japan ended. As demobilisation of individuals was based upon age and length of service Denis was trained as an instructor before finally being demobbed in October 1946.

Upon demobilisation he briefly contemplated a career as a journalist, but his commanding officer advised him against it: "Don’t do that. At the end of your career you will have nothing to show for it."

Eventually Denis decided to immigrate to New Zealand, as he had some cousins on his father's side in New Zealand who said they could offer him a job in their raincoat factory. He had served with a number of New Zealanders, who made a favourable impression on him. Using his service gratuity he bought himself the cheapest around-the-world fare. He arrived via a holiday in America in New Zealand on 21 January 1947 with £6 in his pocket and took up his cousins' (Hans Adam and Greta Roger) offer of employment.

He indulged his love of flying by joining the Wellington Aero Club where he flew Tiger Moths (until he gave it up when he realised the cost was becoming prohibitive) and later was a foundation member of the Upper Valley Gliding Club.

He also became involved in Wellington in the art and music scene. At the age of 29, Adam met at the Majestic Cabaret Verna Finlayson; the couple later married during a visit to Adam's family in London in 1953.

After several years working in the raincoat factory, during which he reached the position of assistant manager in 1950, Denis decided to branch out on his own. He had identified an opportunity in the insurance industry but lacked the necessary capital. For many years the members of the Council of Underwriters – which had 80% of the New Zealand insurance market – had non-completion agreements in place and also agreements with a number of other insurance companies who were not members to keep insurance brokers out of the market. In 1957 this practice changed as a result of efforts by Price Forbes, a major Lloyd's insurance broker, which led to the establishment of the Insurance Brokers Registration Agreement.

To obtain the required capital to establish his own insurance business, Adam took advantage of a scheme whereby oil companies were prepared to assist with financing suitable people into ownership of a service station. At the time oil companies were not allowed to directly own their retail outlets.

With assistance from the Atlantic Union Oil Company in 1957, he purchased a service station in Petone, which had been losing approximately £2,000 a year. He quickly discovered that some staff and some customers had been stealing from the business and that the petrol delivery drivers were delivering less than they claimed on the invoice. He put a stop to these practices and within two to three months the business was profitable and eventually the most profitable Atlantic Union service station in the region. At the same time, he started a small insurance agency, initially for the FAME insurance Company as a client, and later another with the General Accident Fire & Life Assurance Corporation.

By 1959, he had enough business confidence and capital to sell the service station and make the transition from agent to insurance broker.

Within two years of entering the insurance industry as an insurance agent, Adam was able to rent office space in the Paragon chambers in Lambton Quay in Wellington and establish himself as an insurance broker under the name Adam & Adam. The second Adam was his older brother Peter, who had no connection with the firm but was a director of a merchant bank in England, as well as an underwriter at Lloyd's of London, at a time when a London connection gave some commercial respectability.

His experience at the service station had led him to anticipate the growth in motor vehicle insurance, which became the foundation of his insurance-broking business as well as fire and accident insurance. He was also one of the first to offer professional indemnity insurance in New Zealand. His brokerage proved very successful, and he came to dominate the insurance brokerage sector.

== Art collection ==
With the profits from his business, Denis and Verna began investing in property. In the 1960s, they also began buying original art. Their first piece of New Zealand art was Bush Scene by John Snadden whose work they had admired when it was hanging in a Willis St coffee bar. Soon works by Don Binney, Mervyn Williams and Colin McCahon followed, along with other artists.

By 1975, their art collection had grown so large that they established the Adam Foundation to consolidate the ownership of their growing investment. Gradually the foundation's activities extended to support arts in general with a focus on emerging New Zealand artists. By 2002, the foundation's art collection was valued at between NZ$1 and NZ$2 million.

== Philanthropy ==
Denis and Verna became with time major contributors to the Wellington and New Zealand arts scene. Their biggest donation was that of NZ$1 million in 1998 to Victoria University to assist in the building of what became the Adam Art Gallery. Other notable contributions were to the Adam Concert Room at Victoria University of Wellington, the Adam Foundation Prize for Creative Writing, the Adam Portraiture Award and Exhibition, the Adam Chamber Music Festival, the NZSO National Youth Orchestra, the Adam Auditorium at City Gallery Wellington, and the Adam International Cello Competition.

The Adams also funded Playmarket's Adam Playreading series at Wellington's Downstage Theatre as well as funding one-off events and an extensive number of individuals. In 2017, the Adam Foundation made a substantial gift towards a new centre of musical, cultural and educational excellence being planned for Wellington's Civic Square. In gratitude, the new auditorium will be named the Adam Auditorium.

== Death ==
Denis Adam died on 17 October 2018, aged 94, in Wellington, New Zealand, following a long illness.

== Honours and awards ==
In the 1993 Queen's Birthday Honours, Adam was appointed an Officer of the Order of the British Empire, for services to the arts and community. In the 2000 New Year Honours, he was made a Companion of the New Zealand Order of Merit, also for services to the arts and the community.

In 2001, Adam was conferred with an honorary Doctor of Literature degree by Victoria University of Wellington. In 2006, Denis and Verna Adam were given the inaugural award for Patronage to the Arts by the Arts Foundation.

At the time of his death, Adam was trustee emeritus of the New Zealand Portrait Gallery.

== Bibliography ==
Adam's story features in Promised New Zealand – Fleeing Nazi Persecution by Freya Klier and translated by Jenny Rawlings.
