= Don McLaren =

New Zealand businessman

Don McLaren CNZM
- McLaren in March 2014
- Born: Donald George McLaren; 21 August 1933; Auckland, New Zealand
- Died: 5 November 2014 (aged 81); Auckland, New Zealand
- Occupation: Businessman
- Known for: Animal healthcare business, thoroughbred racehorse breeding

Donald George McLaren CNZM (21 August 1933 – 5 November 2014) was a New Zealand businessman specialising in equine pharmaceuticals.

== Biography ==
Born in the Auckland suburb of Epsom in 1933, McLaren founded Bomac Laboratories, an animal remedies company, in 1958. The company, which held 154 patents, 55 inventions, and registered 360 products in New Zealand, was sold to the German company Bayer in 2010.

McLaren was also active in the thoroughbred racing industry. He established Northfields Stud near Karaka, served on the committee of the Auckland Racing Club from 1980 to 1999, including a term as president from 1995 to 1999, and was patron of the New Zealand racing hall of fame.

He was inducted into the New Zealand Business Hall of Fame in 1999. In the 2000 New Year Honours, McLaren was appointed an Officer of the New Zealand Order of Merit for services to the animal health industry and racing. He was promoted to Companion of the same order in the 2014 New Year Honours. In 2013, he received an honorary DSc degree from Massey University.

He died in Auckland on 5 November 2014.
