= Thomas William Walker =

Anglo-New Zealand soil scientist

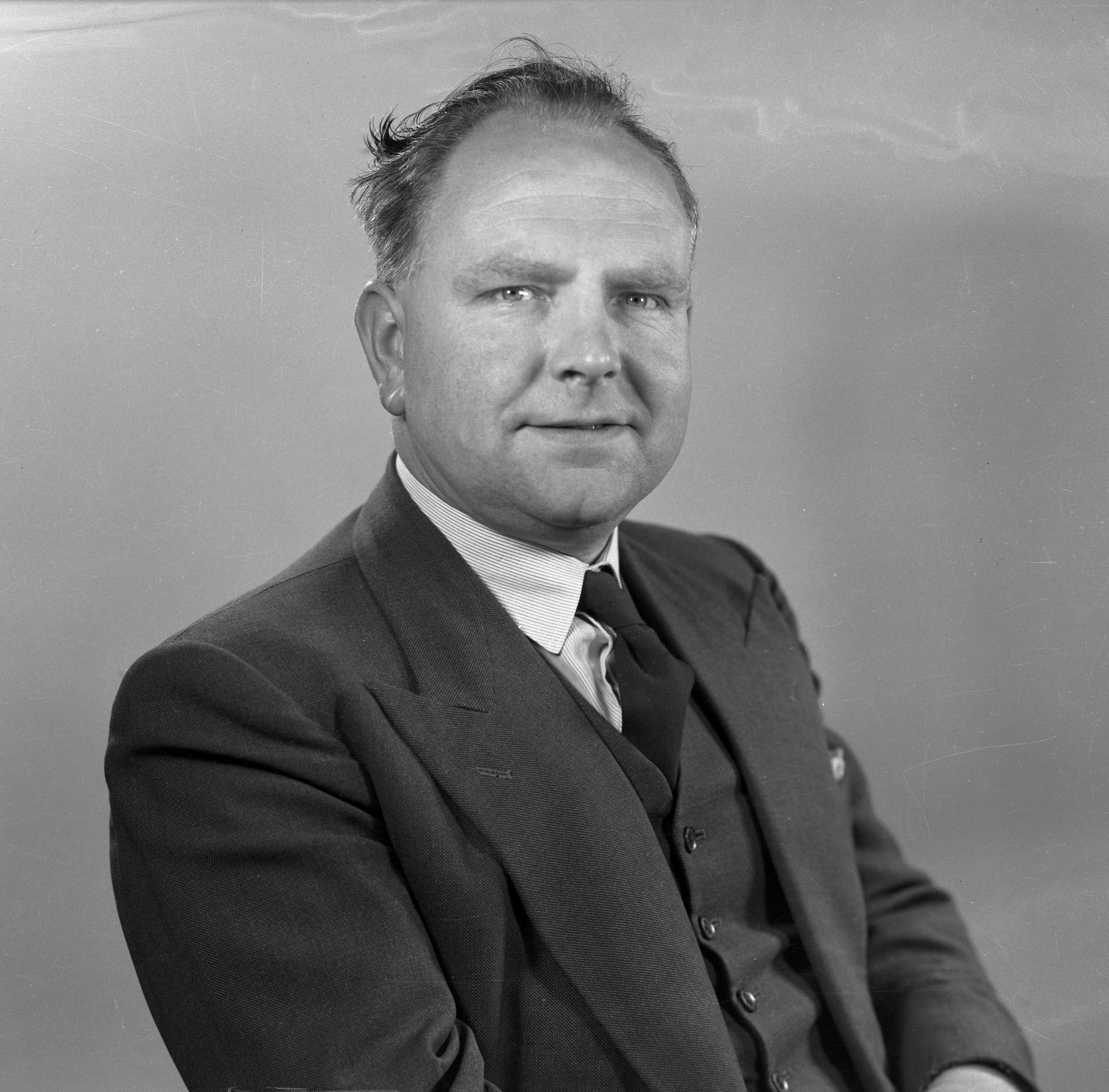
Walker, photographed by Ron Blackmore some time 1952–1966

Thomas William Walker, ONZM (2 July 1916 – 8 November 2010) was an Anglo-New Zealand soil scientist. He was known as "Tom" or "John" or "Johnnie" after the Johnnie Walker brand of whisky, or "The Prof" to students and latterly viewers of Maggie's Garden Show. To his family he was "Baba".

Born in Shepshed, Leicestershire, he was educated at Loughborough Grammar School and the Royal College of Science. He continued his career at Rothamsted Experimental Station, University of Manchester and for the National Agricultural Advisory Service. In 1952, he emigrated to New Zealand, to become the first professor of soil science at Canterbury Agricultural College. He returned to Britain in 1958, but came back in 1960, to his old job at the soon to be renamed Lincoln College, New Zealand. He retired in 1979, becoming emeritus professor from then until his death in 2010.

== Honours ==
- 1997: the Rutherford Gold Medal from the RSNZ
- 2000: appointed an Officer of the New Zealand Order of Merit, for services to soil science, in the 2000 New Year Honours.
