= Joan Ferner =

New Zealand women's rights advocate (1933–2020)

Joan Ferner CNZM
- Born: 15 March 1933; Vancouver, British Columbia, Canada
- Died: 10 June 2020 (aged 87); Wellington, New Zealand
- Occupation: Public servant
- Known for: Women's rights advocacy

Eleanor Joan Ferner CNZM (15 March 1933 – 10 June 2020) was a New Zealand women's rights advocate and public servant.

Born in Vancouver, British Columbia, Canada, on 15 March 1933, Ferner emigrated to New Zealand in the 1950s after meeting her New Zealand-born husband in Canada. She became a naturalised New Zealand citizen in 1978.

Ferner worked as a policy advisor in the New Zealand public service. She was a strong advocate for women's rights, especially in relation to equal pay, economic autonomy and access to higher education, and was active in the Federation of University Women and the National Council of Women.

In the 2000 New Year Honours, Ferner was appointed a Companion of the New Zealand Order of Merit, for services to women and the community.

Ferner died in Wellington on 10 June 2020.
