= Whero O Te Rangi Bailey =

New Zealand weaver (1935–2016)

Whero O Te Rangi Bailey QSO
- Born: 1935; Cape Egmont, New Zealand
- Died: December 1, 2016 (aged 80–81)
- Other names: Poppy Bailey
- Occupations: Teacher; weaver; textile artist
- Known for: weaving and artworks

Whero O Te Rangi Bailey QSO (1935 – 1 December 2016; also known as Poppy) was a New Zealand Māori weaver and textile artist. She was a teacher at New Plymouth Girls' High School as well as a counsellor and a member of the Māori Women's Welfare League. Bailey was a member of Te Roopu Raranga Whatu o Aotearoa. In 2000, she was awarded the Queen's Service Order. Her master weaver status was formally acknowledged when she was appointed to the Kāhui Whiritoi group of Te Roopu Raranga Whatu o Aotearoa. A large outdoor mural depicting Bailey can be found in Christchurch.

== Biography ==
Bailey was brought up in Parihaka. She was employed from 1968 to 1997 as a high school teacher with much of her career spent at the New Plymouth Girls' High School. Bailey was also a councillor for over 30 years. She was a member of the Maori Women's Welfare League and was an advocate for Māori arts, language, culture, and history, travelling New Zealand to pass on her knowledge and expertise. In June 2016 Bailey participated in the Taranaki peace hīkoi.

Bailey died on 1 December 2016.

== Art ==
Bailey was regarded as a master weaver with this status being formally acknowledged when she was appointed by the Te Roopu Raranga Whatu and the New Zealand Māori Arts and Crafts Institute to the Kāhui Whiritoi group. While a member of this group of Bailey would have hosted students to discuss weaving and encourage the development of exhibitions. She also supported and provided guidance on the strategic direction of Te Roopu Raranga Whatu and championed weaving through national institutions and international networks.

== Awards and honours ==
In 2000, Bailey was awarded the Companion of the Queen's Service Order in the New Years Honours list. A mural depicting Bailey by Canadian artist Kevin Ledo features on the Crown Plaza Hotel in Christchurch.
