= Pollok, New Zealand =

Pollok
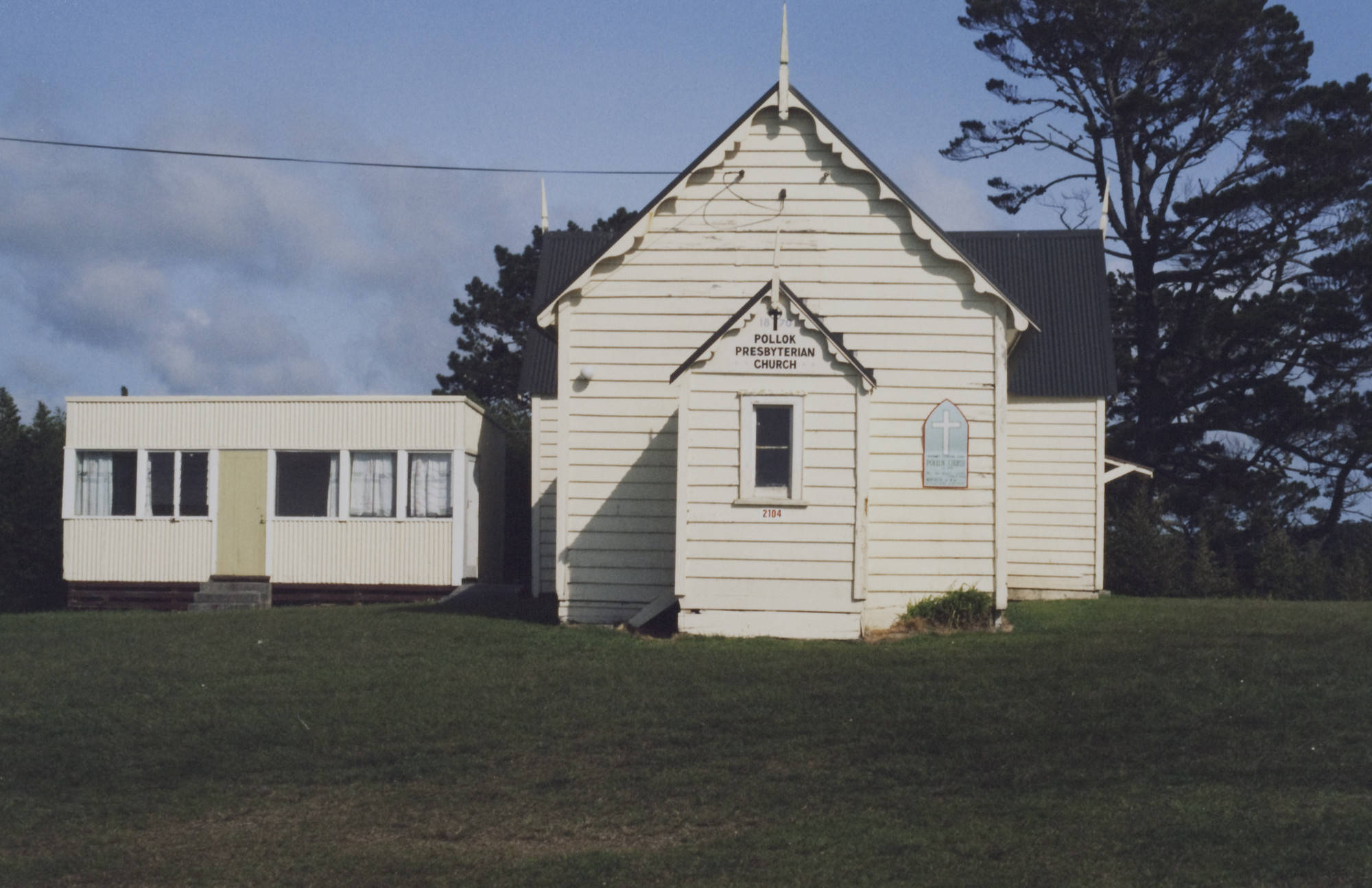
- Pollok Presbyterian Church, c.1996
- Interactive map of Pollok
- Coordinates: 37.139°S 174.618°E
- Country: New Zealand
- Region: Auckland Region
- Ward: Franklin ward
- Board: Franklin Local Board

Government
  - Territorial Authority: Auckland Council
- Postcode: 2684
- Area code: 09

Pollok is a small settlement on the Āwhitu Peninsula in the Auckland Region of New Zealand. It is located to the north-west of Waiuku.

== History ==
Pollok is a part of the rohe of Ngāti Te Ata Waiohua. The Crown purchased the land in 1861, and in 1865 the town was founded by Scottish immigrants from Pollokshaws near Glasgow, led by James Milne Smith, the reverend of the Pollokshaws United Original Secession Church. Smith tried to establish a self-contained and self-sufficient religious community at Pollok. In 1870, his church was joined by the Pollok Presbyterian Church.

Smith left the community in 1882, when the community's combined church and school was destroyed in a fire. After Smith's departure, the Auckland Education Board purchased a site next to the Pollok Presbyterian Church, and opened a school on 11 July 1883.

In the early 1910s, the first telephone exchange was constructed in the area in Pollok. This house was later moved to the historical precinct at the Waiuku Museum.

In 2005, the Pollok School was closed.

== Government ==
Pollok was originally governed by the Pollock Settlement Road District Board, formed 13 February 1868, before amalgamating with Franklin County in 1913.

== Education ==
Pollok School was established in the town in 1883. It operated for over 120 years as a primary school, until its closure in 2005. As of 2023, the closest school to the settlement is Awhitu District School, a coeducational full primary school (years 1–8) with a roll of 108 students as of July 2026..
