= No. 183 Squadron RAF =

Defunct flying squadron of the Royal Air Force

No. 183 (Gold Coast) Squadron RAF
- Active: 1 November 1942 – 15 Nov 1945
- Country: United Kingdom
- Branch: Royal Air Force
- Nickname(s): Gold Coast
- Motto(s): Versatility

Insignia
- Squadron Badge: A demi-dragon holding rockets with maple leaves
- Identification symbol: HF (November 1942 – Nov 1945)

No. 183 (Gold Coast) Squadron RAF was a Royal Air Force Squadron that was a fighter-bomber unit in World War II.

== History ==
=== Formation ===
The squadron formed on 2 March 1942 at RAF Church Fenton and then equipped with rocket armed Typhoons. It was soon involved in attacks on targets in France from the UK.

On 18 April 1943 the squadron undertook a bombing raid on Yuinvale and again on 14 May at Tricqueville. During June 1943 the squadron undertook shipping reconnaissance missions and rhubarbs, as well as a bombing attack at Morlaix. July was also a busy month for shipping reconnaissance missions. On 16 August members of the squadron were attacked by Messerschmitt Bf 109s but no one was hit. On 23 September the squadron bombed Poulmic twice missing two Messerschmitt Bf 110s but hitting the hangar and dispersals. On 3 October, members of the squadron came across six Focke-Wulf Fw 190's off the French coast whilst escorting Mosquitos. Walter Dring shoots one into the sea whilst F/O Mitchell shoots down the other. On the 22nd the squadron attacked destroyers in the harbour at St. Malo, with three direct hits and the destruction of a tanker being recorded. Two days later the squadron attacked a 6,000-ton merchant ship in Cherbourg Harbour. In November the squadron carried out a multitude of tasks, including attacking a 4,000-ton ship with rocket projectiles on 22 November. On 25 December 1943 Walter Dring shot down a Focke-Wulf Fw 200 Condor.

In January 1944 the squadron carried out a variety of sweeps, but by the end of the month they had lost six pilots and the morale was poor.

=== Relocation to the mainland of Europe ===
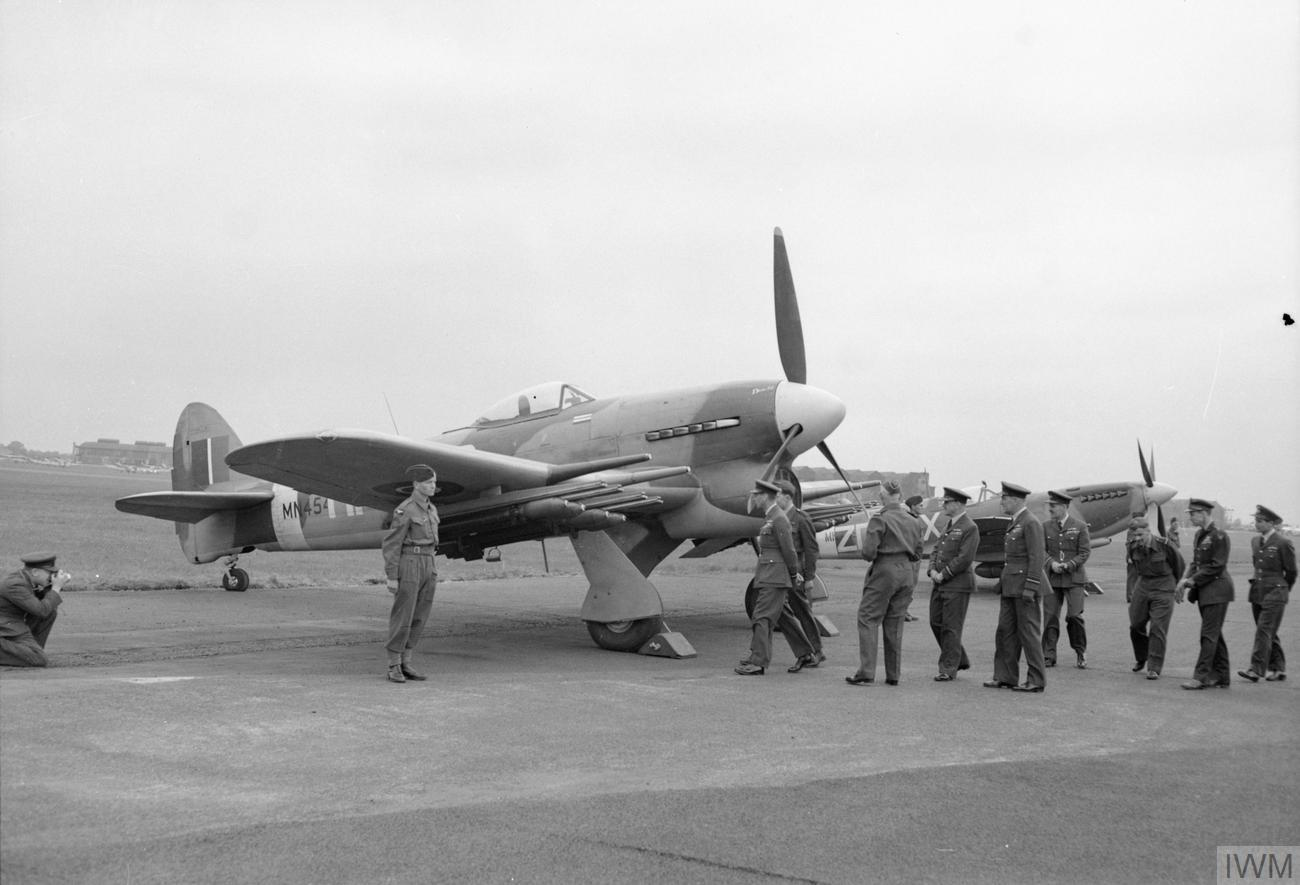
King George VI and his entourage of senior RAF officers walk over to Hawker Typhoon Mark IB, MN454 'HF-S', of No. 183 Squadron RAF, while inspecting aircraft and equipment which will be used in the forthcoming invasion of Normandy at Northolt, Middlesex. MN454 was flown by F H Scarlett, the Commanding Officer of 183 Squadron.

Following the D-Day landings on 6 June 1944 the squadron moved to airstrips on the beachhead in France, before joining the Allied advance across Europe via the Netherlands, attacking targets of opportunity on the battlefield. During this period it was one of the four squadrons in 123 Wing, 84 Group of 2nd Tactical Air Force, the others being 164, 198 and 609.

After the Allied forces had crossed the Rhine River the squadron operated their aircraft with two 1000 lb bombs instead of the usual rockets and changed their role to attacking shipping around the Friesian Islands from a temporary airfield established at Lingen in Germany. They also attacked the U-boat pens at Wilhelmshaven.

On 4 May 1945 last day of the war the squadron attacked German shipping. After the attacks, upon noticing that the main target was apparently undamaged, the squadron commander Jimmy Cullen and his number two returned and made a strafing run with cannon against the ship. However Cullen's aircraft SW454 was hit by flak and he had to crash land on a beach on Fehman Island. Captured, he was advised by the Germans that he had been attacking a ship which flying the white flag. The day after his imprisonment following the end of hostilities he found the cell door open. Thinking it was maybe an attempt to shoot him while attempting to escape he waited a day before making his way to a nearby beach, stealing a boat and making his way to mainland. There he requisitioned a car and made his way south until he meet an advancing American troops. He then returned to his command of the squadron.

Following the end of hostilities the squadron relocated to a former Luftwaffe airfield at Wunsdorf, near Hanover. The squadron returned to the UK after the end of hostilities in Europe and converted to Spitfires at RAF Chilbolton and then to Tempests in preparation for its deployment to the Asia theatre of operations. Before this deployment could happen the war with Japan ended.

=== Post war ===
At the end of World War 2 with the draw down from war-time strength the RAF started to disband and renumber squadrons. Higher numbered squadrons were generally replaced with the lower, and so more senior, squadron numbers with the exception of famous units such as 617 Squadron were disbanded. As a result, the squadron was disbanded upon re-numbering as No. 54 Squadron RAF on 15 November 1945.

== Aircraft operated ==
Aircraft operated by No. 183 Squadron RAF
From	To	Aircraft	Variant
Nov 1942	Feb 1943	Hawker Hurricane	I
Nov 1942	Dec 1942	Hawker Typhoon	IA
Nov 1942	Jun 1945	Hawker Typhoon	IB
Jun 1945	Nov 1945	Supermarine Spitfire	IX
Oct 1945	Nov 1945	Hawker Tempest	II

== Squadron commanders ==
The following have commanded 183 Squadron:

- November 1942 to 24 October 1943: Arthur V. Gowers, DFC. Killed in action on 24 October 1943
- 25 October 1943 to April 1944: Walter Dring DSO, DFC. Born 1916. Joins Squadron 183 in December 1942. Killed in action on 13 January 1945.
- April to July 1944: Felix Hugh Scarlett. Killed on 12 July 1944 after his Typhoon was hit by anti-aircraft fire while leading a four aircraft attack on the radar station on Cap d'Antifer in France.
- July 1944 to January 1945: Reginald William Lee Mulliner DFC.
- January and February 1945: H.M. Mason, DFC. Born on 30 September 1921 in Napier, New Zealand. A former motor engineer he joined the RNZAF in May 1941. Following command of 183 squadron he was promoted to command No. 135 Wing.
- February 1945 to October 1945: James "Jimmy" Roy Cullen. DFC. Born in Waihi, New Zealand.

== Notable squadron members ==
- Denis Adam. He was one of three German-born pilots to serve in the British Royal Air Force during the Second World War. As such, if he had been captured by the Germans, he was liable to execution as a traitor, rather than being treated as a prisoner of war.
- Peter Edward "Slosher" Raw, DFC. On 21 Mar 1944 Flight lieutenant Raw took off from RAF Manston in a Typhoon heading for a sweep over Holland with the task of engaging enemy aircraft or ground targets of opportunity. His section were strafing barges on the Meuse river when Raw's Typhoon was hit by anti-aircraft fire and struck the mast of one of the barges. The aircraft crashed a few hundred metres from the river and Raw was killed. Peter Raw was one of four brothers all of whom served with the Royal Air Force, with three losing their lives in the conflict.
