= Sylvia Fausett =

New Zealand community leader (1933–2024)

Sylvia Fausett MNZM
- Born: Sylvia Mary Ellen Letter; 4 April 1933; Islington, London, England
- Died: 4 July 2024 (aged 91); Auckland, New Zealand
- Spouse: Robin Fausett (m. 1955)
- Children: 2
- Awards: New Zealand Suffrage Centennial Medal 1993

Sylvia Mary Ellen Fausett MNZM (née Letter; 4 April 1933 – 4 July 2024) was a New Zealand community worker. She was awarded a New Zealand Suffrage Centennial Medal, and in 1999 was appointed as a Member of the New Zealand Order of Merit, for services to the community.

== Early life and family ==
Fausett was born in Islington, London, England, on 4 April 1933. In 1955, she married Robin Fausett in Edmonton, north London, and the couple went on to have two children.

== Career ==
After moving to New Zealand, Fausett became involved as a volunteer in a number of organisations through her children's activities. She was involved in Panmure Citizen's Advice Bureau, Plunket, Girl Guides, the creche at Howick Recreation Centre, and was both a committee member and chair of the Howick Road Activity Centre. The centre hosted after-school activities, although it began as a drop-in centre formed by Fausett. Fausett chaired the Mount Wellington Senior Citizens' Trust for ten years. Fausett also volunteered in educational activities such as Ministry of Education-funded programmes to improve numeracy and literacy, and was Tamaki Intermediate School music supervisor for twenty years. Fausett was the chair of the board of trustees for Tamaki Intermediate School and Tamaki College.

== Death ==
Fausett died in Auckland on 4 July 2024, aged 91.

== Honours and awards ==
Fausett was awarded the New Zealand Suffrage Centennial Medal in 1993. The medal was awarded to people who had made a significant contribution to women's rights or women's issues in New Zealand. In the 2000 New Year Honours, Fausett was appointed a Member of the New Zealand Order of Merit, for services to the community. In 2005, she was one of six Aucklanders awarded a Mayor's Living Legend Award by Dick Hubbard.
