= 1999 New Zealand gallantry awards =

Awards list for New Zealand

The 1999 New Zealand gallantry awards were announced via a special honours list on 23 October 1999, and recognised one member of the New Zealand Defence Force for actions during United Nations peacekeeping operations in Cambodia in 1992.

== New Zealand Gallantry Decoration (NZGD) ==
- Chief Petty Officer Writer John Clinton Lionel Oxenham – of Lower Hutt; Royal New Zealand Navy (Retired).

On 1 December 1992 Chief Petty Officer Oxenham, who was serving in Cambodia with a United Nations peacekeeping mission, was a member of a patrol conducting operations along the Shroeng Sen River. During this patrol, Chief Petty Officer Oxenham, together with three British officers and two Filipino senior ratings, were taken prisoner by members of the National Army of Democratic Kampuchea, formerly the Khmer Rouge. The group was detained for four days while negotiations to release them took place. It was during this period that Chief Petty Officer Oxenham ensured that their capture did not have a tragic outcome. His positive and level-headed behaviour was instrumental in diffusing a very tense and potentially life-threatening situation. The controlled but relaxed approach adopted by Chief Petty Officer Oxenham helped to reassure his fellow captives, while this behaviour, which often bordered on careful affront, including two failed escape attempts, demonstrated to the captors that the group were totally unwilling to acquiesce to captivity. At a time when he and his colleagues were under extreme duress, he positively, bravely and effectively influenced the interaction between captors and captives, such that all prisoners were eventually released unharmed.
