= George James Macdonald (naval officer) =

New Zealand naval officer, civil engineer and inventor

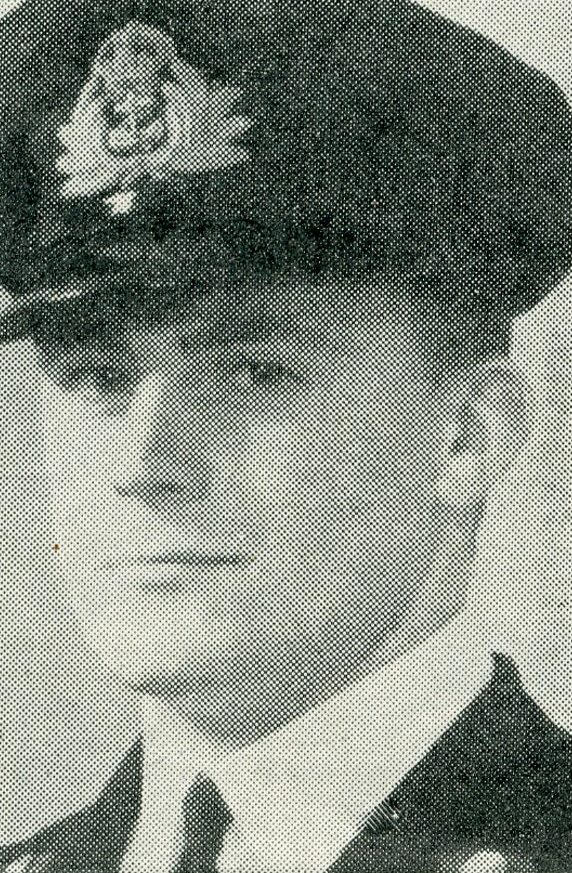
- Portrait of Macdonald, 1942
- Born: 30 September 1921; Wellington, New Zealand
- Died: 22 January 1982 (aged 60)
- Military career
- Allegiance: New Zealand
- Branch: Royal New Zealand Naval Volunteer Reserve
- Service years: 1938–1946
- Rank: Lieutenant Commander
- Commands: 21st MTB Flotilla; MTB 241
- Conflicts: Second World War
- Awards: Distinguished Service Order; Distinguished Service Cross & Two Bars; Mentioned in Despatches (2)

George James Macdonald DSO, DSC & Two Bars (30 September 1921 – 22 January 1982) was a New Zealander who served in the Royal Navy during the Second World War. He was the most decorated New Zealand naval officer of the war.

== Early life ==
George James Macdonald, known as Jim, was born in Wellington in New Zealand on 30 September 1921 to John Macdonald, a government worker, and his wife Amy. Educated locally at Thorndon School and then Wellington College, Macdonald was briefly apprenticed to an optician before commencing employment in August 1938 as a bank worker. The same year he joined the New Zealand Division of the Royal Naval Volunteer Reserve (RNVR), holding the rank of ordinary seaman.

== Second World War ==
On the outbreak of the Second World War, Macdonald, now an able seaman in the RNVR was called up for service. His initial war service was as a gunner aboard the armed merchant vessels Trienza and Fordsdale, which steamed the route between Australia and Nauru, in the South Pacific. He went to the United Kingdom in February 1941. He trained at HMS King Alfred, the shore training establishment at Hove, passing out as the top student on his course. Commissioned as a midshipman, further training at Fort William in Scotland followed before he was posted to Motor Torpedo Boat (MTB) 14. This was based at Felixstowe in Suffolk.

In January 1942 Macdonald, now a sub-lieutenant, was assigned to MTB 31, on which he was second in command. On the night of 3 March, the boat was in an engagement with German E-boats while attacking a merchant ship passing through the English Channel. MTB 31 was badly damaged but Macdonald ignored orders from its captain to abandon the boat and instead was able to save it. In recognition of his gallantry, Macdonald was awarded the Distinguished Service Cross (DSC) for "gallantry, skill and endurance while serving in H.M. Motor Torpedo Boats in action against the Enemy".

After this action, Macdonald was given command of his own boat, MTB 241, and was involved in a number of engagements and operations. His successes saw him awarded a Bar to his DSC in July 1943. Promoted to acting lieutenant in September 1943, he appointed commander of the 21st MTB Flotilla; he would lead this for the remainder of the war. He was awarded a second Bar to the DSC on 4 July 1944 for "outstanding leadership, zeal and devotion to duty in successful operations in Light Coastal Craft". In September he was awarded the Distinguished Service Order (DSO) in recognition of his leadership during an action in which his flotilla sunk two ships.

Promoted to lieutenant commander in February 1945, Macdonald ended the war as New Zealand's most decorated naval officer; in addition to the DSO, DSC and two Bars, he was twice mentioned in despatches.

== Later life ==
Macdonald left military service in early 1946 and returned to New Zealand. He worked for the Wellington City Council and after studying civil engineering part-time became the city's deputy engineer in 1971, and its chief engineer in 1978. He was an innovative engineer, developing a number of technologies relating to prefabricated buildings, roadworks and quarrying. He died on 22 January 1982 in Wellington, survived by his wife Evelyn, a former officer in the Women's Royal Naval Service that he had married in 1945, and their five children.
