= List of landslides =

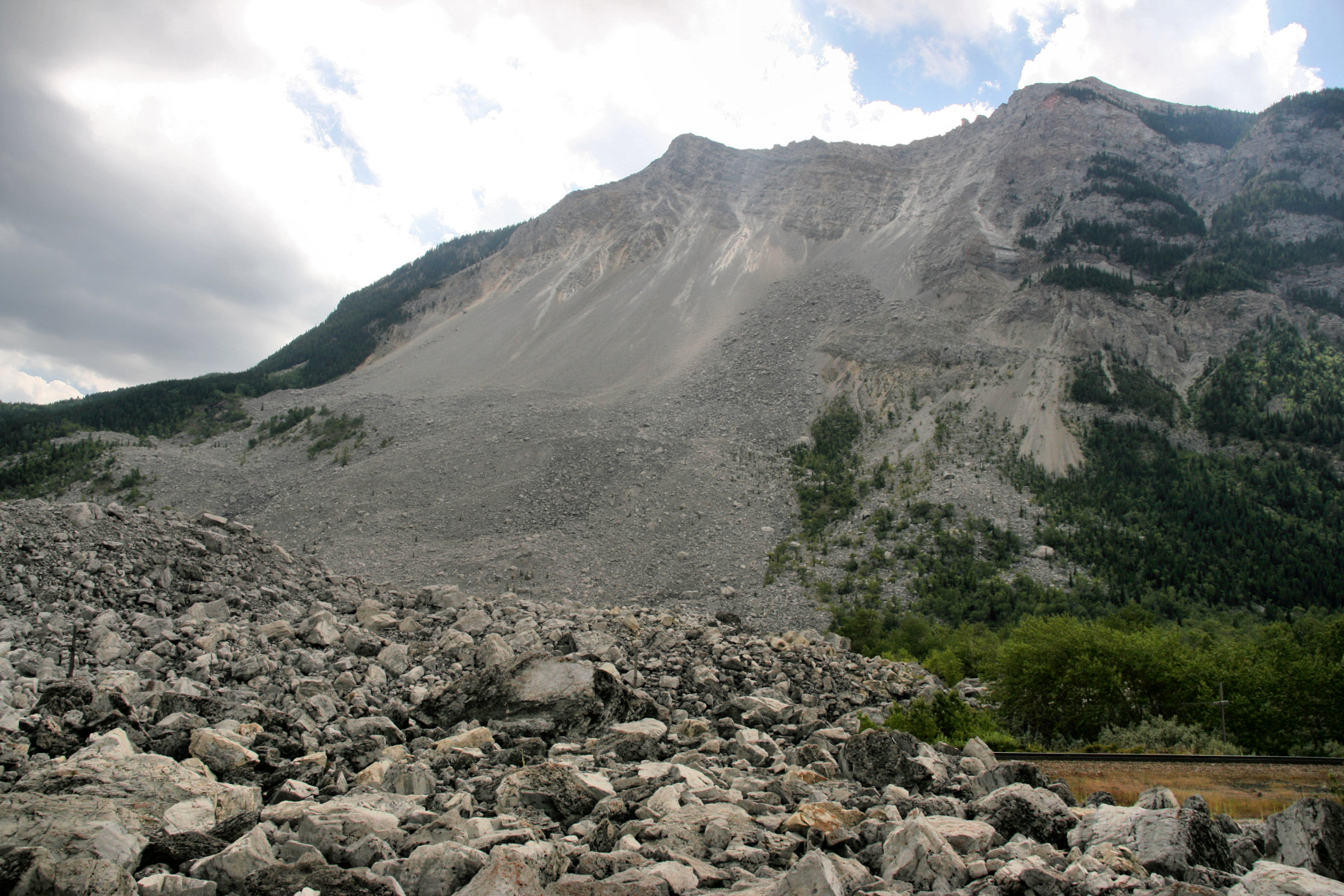
Frank Slide, Turtle Mountain, Alberta, Canada

This list of landslides is a list of notable landslides and mudflows divided into sections by date and type. This list may be incomplete as there is no central catalogue for landslides, although it does exist for some for individual countries or areas. Volumes of landslides are recorded in the scientific literature using cubic kilometres (km^{3}) for the largest and millions of cubic metres (MCM) for most events.

== Prehistoric landslides ==
Note: km^{3} = cubic kilometre(s)

Date	Place	Name	Position	Volume	Comments	Sources
48 Ma	Heart Mountain, Wyoming, US	Everest glacier slide		~2000 km^{3}	Mostly eroded now	
21–22 Ma	Southwest Utah, US	Markagunt gravity slide	37.7°N 112.83°W	~1700–2000 km^{3}		
~6.1 Ma	East Traverse Mountains, Utah, US	East Traverse Mountains mega landslide	40.48°N 111.85°W	~50–100 km^{3}	The landslide comprises the entirety of East Traverse Mountain	
ca. 71,000 BCE	Fogo, Cape Verde Islands		15.00°N 024.45°W	130–160 km^{3}	The eastern flank of the island of Fogo collapsed into the sea, generating a megatsunami. The wave struck Santiago, 55 kilometres (34 mi; 30 nmi) away, with a height of at least 170 metres (558 ft).	
Sometime between 19,000 and 10,000 BCE	Lake Tahoe, California and Nevada, United States			12.5 km^{3}	The landslide occurred along the western shore of the lake, forming McKinney Bay and generating megatsunamis in the lake of about 100 metres (328 ft) in height.	
ca. 15,000 BCE	San Bernardino Mountains, California, United States	Blackhawk slide		0.52 km^{3}	A cube of rock 0.5 miles (0.8 km) on a side slid 1,500 feet (457 m) down the slope of a steep canyon, then exited the canyon and traveled for 5 miles (8 km) across a flat valley at a speed of up to 75 miles per hour (121 km/h).	
13,500 BCE	Green Lake (Southland) New Zealand	Green Lake landslide	45.78°S 167.37°E	27 km^{3}	Likely triggered by large earthquake on or near the Alpine Fault	
Late Pleistocene	British Columbia	Cheekye Fan		~0.15 km^{3}	Collapse of the western flank of Mount Garibaldi	
≈ 10,000 BCE	Seymareh, Iran	Seymareh landslide	33.00°N 047.65°E	20 km^{3}	Collapse of the north-eastern flank of Kabir Kouh ridge across the Seymareh River	
~9900 BCE	Otago, New Zealand	Lochnagar Landslide	44.58°S 168.60°E	1 km^{3}	Collapse of mountain forming Lake Lochnagar.	
Between ~8020 and ~6520 BCE	Sullorsuaq Strait, Greenland			Various	Seven very large tsunamigenic landslides struck Sullorsuaq Strait over this 1,500-year period, some from the southern coast of the Nuussuaq Peninsula and others from the northern coast of Disko Island. No evidence has been found of the tsunamis or megatsunamis they probably generated.	
~6370 BCE	Mount Etna, Sicily			25 km^{3}	An 80-square-kilometre (31 sq mi), 300-metre-thick (980-foot) area of the eastern slope of Mount Etna collapsed into the Mediterranean Sea, triggering a megatsunami in the Eastern Mediterranean with an initial wave height along the coast of Sicily of 40 metres (131 ft). It struck the Neolithic village of Atlit Yam off what is now the coast of Israel, where it had a height of 2.5 metres (8 ft 2 in) and prompted the village's abandonment.	
~5650 BCE	Sullorsuaq Strait, Greenland				A large landslide entered Sullorsuaq Strait, generating a megatsunami which struck Alluttoq Island, where it had a run-up height of 41 to 66 metres (135 to 217 ft).	
~5350 BCE	Sullorsuaq Strait, Greenland				A large landslide entered Sullorsuaq Strait, generating a megatsunami which struck Alluttoq Island, where it had a run-up height of 45 to 70 metres (148 to 230 ft).	
~2800 BCE	Zion Canyon, Utah, US			0.286 km^{3}	Landslide created the currently level floor of Zion Canyon inside Zion National Park.	
~1920 BCE	Jishi Gorge, Qinghai Province, China	Jishi Gorge outburst flood		0.040–0.080 km^{3}	Landslide dammed the Yellow River, breach of dam may have caused the Great Flood of Gun-Yu	
~1100 BCE	Mount Storm King, Washington, United States			0.0072 km^{3}	An earthquake generated the Sledgehammer Point Rockslide, which entered waters at least 140 metres (459 ft) deep in Lake Crescent and generated a megatsunami with an estimated maximum run-up height of 82 to 104 metres (269 to 341 ft).	
~200 BCE	North Island, New Zealand			2.2 km^{3}	Dammed Lake Waikaremoana	

== Submarine landslides ==
Note: MCM = million cubic metres; km^{3} = cubic kilometre(s)

Date	Place	Name/article	Position	Volume	Comments	Sources
1.4 Ma	off northern Molokai, Hawaii	Wailau Slide		2,500 km^{3}	The northern third of East Molokai Volcano collapsed suddenly into the Pacific Ocean in a 25-mile (40 km) wide landslide with a 120-mile (193 km) run-out that climbed uphill 900 feet (274 m) from the Hawaiian Trough over the last 80 miles (130 km). It generated a tsunami that was 2,000 feet (610 m) tall locally and which reached California and Mexico.	
Between 1.5 and 0.5 Ma	off northeastern Oahu, Hawaii	Nu'uanu Slide		7,500 km^{3}	The eastern half of the Koʻolau Volcano collapsed into the Pacific Ocean, leaving behind its remnant western rim on Oahu as the Koʻolau Range The landslide had a run-out of more than 140 miles (225 km), climbing about 1,000 feet (305 m) over the last 85 miles (137 km) and leaving a massive debris field north of Oahu and Molokai covering 25,000 square kilometers (9,700 sq mi). The largest piece of debris, the Tuscaloosa Seamount, measures 19 by 11 miles (31 by 18 km) and rises 1.1 miles (1.8 km) above the seafloor.	
Less than 2.6 Ma	off South Africa	Agulhas Slide		20,000 km^{3}	The largest so far described	
ca. 42,000 BP	off North Island, New Zealand	Ruatoria debris avalanche		3,000 km^{3}		
ca. 8,000 BP	Norwegian Sea	Storegga Slide	64.87°N 001.3°E	3,500 km^{3}	Triggered a large tsunami that swept the coasts of the Shetland and Orkney Islands	
18 Nov 1929	Grand Banks of Newfoundland	1929 Grand Banks earthquake	44.54°N 056.01°W	200 km^{3}	Broke 12 submarine communications cables. The tsunami was 3 to 8 metres (10 to 26 ft) tall, had a run-up of 13 metres (43 ft), and killed 28 people on the Burin Peninsula.	
17 Jul 1998	North of New Guinea	1998 Papua New Guinea earthquake		4 km^{3}	The landslide in the Pacific Ocean followed an M 7.0 earthquake by a few minutes and generated tsunamis with heights of 10 to 15 metres (33 to 49 ft) that struck the north coast of Papua New Guinea, killing 2,100 to 2,700 people, injuring 1,000, and leaving 10,000 homeless.	

== Pre-20th-century historic landslides ==
Note: km^{3} = cubic kilometre(s); MCM = million cubic metres

Date	Place	Name/article	Position	Volume	Casualties	Comments	Sources
563	Lake Geneva, Switzerland and France	Tauredunum event	46.35°N 006.86°E		Hundreds to thousands	A landslide apparently triggered a collapse of sediments at the mouth of the River Rhône, resulting in a submarine mudslide that triggered a tsunami which traveled the length of Lake Geneva, reaching a height of 16 metres (52 ft) in some places. The wave destroyed villages and reached Geneva.	
1190	Annapurna IV, Nepal		28.54°N 84.08°E	23.5 km^{3}		The debris formed the vast terrace where Pokhara was built later.	
25 Nov 1248	Mont Granier, France		45.46°N 005.93°E		1000+	Destroyed five villages.	
25 Jan 1348	Dobratsch, Austria	Dobratsch Landslide		900 MCM		Triggered by the Friuli earthquake (8–9 EMS), due to the flood of the river Gail, 2 villages had to be abandoned.	
1425–1450	North Bonneville, Washington, US	Bridge of the Gods (land bridge)	45.66°N 121.94°W	14 km^{3}		Possibly linked to the 1458 Cascadia Earthquake	
About 1560	Ozette, Washington, US	Ozette Indian Village Archeological Site	48.17°N 124.73°W			Partially buried the village at Ozette	
1692	Judgment Hill, Jamaica	1692 Jamaica earthquake		131–181 MCM	19 white people killed; other possible deaths not recorded	The landslide displaced the land surface by up to 800 metres (2,625 ft). The debris travelled 440 metres (1,444 ft) vertically and 1.763 kilometres (1.095 mi) horizontally and accumulated over a 1.09-square-kilometre (0.42 sq mi) area. Documentationm of the timing of the landslide is inexact, but it occurred after the 7 June 1692 earthquake at Port Royal and may have occurred due to heavy rainfall which followed the earthquake, and possibly due to rain associated with a hurricane that struck the area in October 1692.	
19 June 1718	Gansu, China	1718 Tongwei–Gansu earthquake				An M_{s} 7.5 earthquake triggers over 300 landslides, burying villages and resulting in 73,000 deaths.	
22 Feb 1756	Langfjorden, Norway			12 to 15 MCM	32	Slid 400 metres (1,312 ft) down the slope of the mountain Tjellafjellet into the Langfjorden, generating three megatsunamis in the Langfjorden and the Eresfjorden with heights of 40 to 50 metres (131 to 164 ft). The largest landslide in Norway in historic time.	
10 Jun 1786	Kangding-Luding area, Sichuan, southwestern China	1786 Kangding-Luding earthquake				A M 7.75 earthquake on 1 June triggered a large landslide that created a 70-metre (230 ft) high landslide dam in the Dadu River. The dam failed catastrophically on 10 June, the resulting flood extending 1,400 kilometres (870 mi) downstream and killing 100,000 people.	
2 Sep 1806	Canton of Schwyz, Switzerland	Goldau Rockslide	47.05°N 008.55°E	40 MCM	457	Destroyed four villages and caused a tsunami in Lake Lauerz	
24 Dec 1839	Lyme Regis, Dorset	Axmouth to Lyme Regis Undercliff				One of a series of slumps	
1855–1856	British Columbia	Collapse of The Barrier		30 MCM			
1881	Qiaojia County, Yunnan, China	Shigaodi Landslide		530 MCM		Formed dam on Jinsha River	
11 Sep 1881	Elm, Switzerland			7.6 MCM	114–115	A mountainside weakened by quarrying and two months of heavy rains slid into the village, where it buried 83 structures, then across the valley the village stood in and 300 yards (274 m) up the opposite slope.	
13 Mar 1888	Ritter Island, Netherlands East Indies	1888 Ritter Island eruption and tsunami		4 to 5 km^{3}	ca. 3,000	During a volcanic eruption, a significant portion of the island slid 800 metres (2,625 ft) into the sea, generating tsunamis of up to 12 to 15 metres (39 to 49 ft) in height that struck nearby islands and traveled as far south as New Guinea, where they were 8 metres (26 ft) high.	
19 Sep 1889	Cap Diamant, Quebec	Québec rockslide	46.485°N 071.21°W		>40		

== 20th-century landslides ==
=== 1901–1950 ===
Note: km^{3} = cubic kilometre(s); MCM = million cubic metres

Date	Place	Name/article	Position	Volume	Casualties	Comments	Sources
22 Aug 1902	China–Kyrgyzstan border, Xinjiang, China	1902 Turkestan earthquake	39.87°N 076.42°E	>0.2 MCM	5,650–10,000	A landslide triggered by an M_{w} 7.7 earthquake in the Tian Shan mountains. The earthquake triggered landslides in valleys and mountains. Destruction was widespread.	
29 Apr 1903	Turtle Mountain, Alberta, Canada	Frank Slide	49.59°N 114.39°W	30 MCM	70 to 90	About 110 million tonnes (120 million short tons) of limestone rock slid down Turtle Mountain, reaching the opposing hills in 100 seconds and burying the eastern edge of Frank, a mining town then in Alberta. The deadliest and one of the largest landslides in Canadian history.	
15 Jan 1905	Lovatnet, Norway			0.35 MCM	61	Slid 500 metres (1,640 ft) down the slope of the mountain Ramnefjellet into the lake Lovatnet, generating a megatsunami with a height of up to 40.5 metres (133 ft).	
13 Apr 1907	Chryszczata, Bieszczady Mountains, Poland	Zwiezło	49.18°N 022.10°E	12 MCM	0	The biggest historical landslide in the Polish Bieszczady Mountains. Lakes formed in the depressions on the surface of the landslide – "Duszatyn Lakes". The lakes and the surrounding forest are protected in a nature reserve.	
18 Feb 1911	Usoy, Tajikistan	Usoi Dam		2 km^{3}	54	Triggered by M 7.4 earthquake. The rockslide dammed the Murgab River, impounding 65-kilometre-long (40-mile) Lake Sarez, which presently still exists.	
1914	Neuquén and Mendoza, Argentina	Rio Barrancas & Rio Colorado debris flow		2 MCM	190–300	Two small towns were devastated, and numerous ranches and farms destroyed along a 60 km (37 mi) valley. Length of flow:300 km (186 mi)	
March 22, 1915	Britannia Beach, BC, Canada	Britannia Beach landslide disaster		0.1 MCM		On March 22, 1915, a landslide slammed into the mining community burying 56 men, women and children under 15 metres (49 ft) of debris. It is Canada's second largest landslide disaster after 1903 Frank Slide that killed more than 70 people.	
19 May 1919	Kelud, East Java, Indonesia	Kelut Lahars			5110	Lahars caused 5,110 deaths, and destroyed or damaged 104 villages. Length 185 km (115 mi).	
16 Dec 1920	Haiyuan County, Ningxia, China	1920 Haiyuan earthquake			>100,000	Loess flows and landslides over an area of 50,000 km^{2} (19,000 sq mi). Failures in loess caused extreme fissuring, landslide dams, and buried villages.	
1920	Veracruz, Mexico	1920 Xalapa earthquake			est. 600–870	Debris flows destroyed village of Barranca Grande, and were 40 to 65 m (131 to 213 ft) deep. Debris flows extended >40 km (25 mi). Triggered by M~6.5 earthquake.	
1921	Almaty, Kazakhstan	Alma-Ata Debris Flows			~500	A debris flow in the Valley of Alma-Atinka River destroyed the town of Alma-Ata.	
26 Mar 1924	Amalfi Coast, Italy				~100	A series of major landslides after 18 hours of heavy rain	
23 Jun 1925	Gros Ventre Wilderness, Wyoming	Gros Ventre landslide	43.62°N 110.55°W	38 MCM	6 (when the dam failed in 1927)	Blocked the Gros Ventre River, forming a 70-metre-high (230 ft) dam	
9 Mar 1929	Otehake River, Arthur's Pass National Park, South Island, New Zealand	The Falling Mountain landslide	42.89°S 171.68°E	66 MCM		Very rapid rock avalanche triggered by the 1929 Arthur's Pass earthquake	
25 Aug 1933	Diexi, Mao County, Sichuan, China	1933 Diexi earthquake		150 MCM	~3100	The largest landslide formed a 255-metre-high (837 ft) landslide dam on the Min River. This landslide killed all but one of the 577 people in the town of Deixi. The dam then overtopped, causing a flood and 2,500 deaths.	
7 Apr 1934	Tafjorden, Norway			2–3 MCM	40	Slid about 730 metres (2,395 ft) down the slope of the mountain Langhamaren into the Tafjorden, generating a megatsunami that reached a height of between 62 and 63.5 metres (203 and 208 ft).	
13 Sep 1936	Lovatnet, Norway			1 MCM	74	Slid 800 metres (2,625 ft) down the slope of the mountain Ramnefjellet into the lake Lovatnet, generating a megatsunami with a height of more than 74 metres (243 ft).	
5 Jul 1938	Kwansai, Hyogo Prefecture, Japan				~1000	Many landslides occurred on the slopes of Mount Rokko, 130,000 homes damaged or destroyed by landslides and floods.	
13 Dec 1941	Huaraz, Ancash, Peru	Huaraz debris flow		>10 MCM	4,000–6,000	Caused by rupture of a moraine dam impounding a lake, temporarily dammed the Santa River, after 2 days that failed and the flood swept down the valley to the coast.	
April 1944	Columbia Reservoir, Washington, United States			3.1 to 3.8 MCM	0	The landslide along the shore of what later was renamed Franklin D. Roosevelt Lake about 98 miles (158 km) above Grand Coulee Dam generated a tsunami which reached a maximum height of 30 feet (9 m) along the opposite shore 5,000 feet (1,524 m) away.	
16 Aug 1945	Mantaro Valley, Peru	Kuntur Sinqa rockslide		5.5 MCM	none from landslide	The rockslide formed a 100-metre-high (330 ft) dam at Rio Mantaro, which failed after 73 days, causing a flood.	
19 Dec 1945	Alcalá del Júcar, Albacete, Spain				16	Worst rockfall to hit the municipality in the 20th century	
18 Sep 1948	Assam, India	Guwahati landslide			~500	Triggered by heavy rain	
10 Jul 1949	Gharm Oblast, Tajikistan	Khait landslide, Yasman valley flowslide	39.17°N 070.90°E	75 MCM; 245 MCM	~800; ~4,000(7,200 for all the landslides)	Triggered by the 1949 Khait earthquake, largest of several landslides	
27 Jul 1949	Franklin D. Roosevelt Lake, Washington			1.5 to 2.3 MCM	0	The landslide near the mouth of Hawk Creek, about 35 miles (56 km) north of Grand Coulee Dam, entered the lake and generated a 65-foot (20 m) tsunami that struck the town of Lincoln. The wave was noted by observers as far as 20 miles (32 km) away.	

=== 1951–1975 ===
Note: km^{3} = cubic kilometre(s); MCM = million cubic metres

Date	Place	Name/article	Position	Volume	Casualties	Comments	Sources
April 1952	Franklin D. Roosevelt Lake, Washington, United States			11.5 MCM	0	The landslide 3 miles (4.8 km) below the Kettle Falls Bridge generated a tsunami which reached a maximum height of 65 feet (20 m) along the opposite shore of the lake. The wave was observed on the lake as far as 6 miles (9.7 km) away.	
15 Dec 1952	Nuussuaq Peninsula, western Greenland	Niiortuut landslide	70.349°N 053.178°W	5.9 MCM	1	The landslide began at a height of 500 to 700 metres (1,640 to 2,297 ft) on a slope of the mountain Niiortuut, was 80 metres (262 ft) thick, and traveled 2,750 metres (3,007 yd). Between 1,800,000 and 4,500,000 cubic metres (2,400,000 and 5,900,000 cu yd) of material entered the sea and generated a tsunami in Sullorsuaq Strait (known in Danish as Vaigat Strait). With a run-up height of 4.5 to 7.7 metres (15 to 25 ft), it struck a group of four fishermen 10 kilometres (6.2 mi) away on the southern coast of the Nuussuaq Peninsula, killing one. Then it struck the town of Qullissat 30 kilometres (19 mi) away on Disko Island, where it had a run-up height of 2.2 to 2.7 metres (7 ft 3 in to 8 ft 10 in).	
1953	Wakayama Prefecture, Japan	Arida River landslides			1,046	Multiple slides due to typhoon. Many landslide dams were formed and subsequently failed in the Aridagawa valley.	
1953	Minamiyamashiro, Sōraku District, Kyoto, Japan	Minamiyamashiro landslides			336 dead or missing	5,122 homes were destroyed or badly damaged by landslides and floods.	
February 1953	Franklin D. Roosevelt Lake, Washington, United States				0	A series of landslides about 100 miles (161 km) upstream from Grand Coulee Dam generated a series of tsunamis with a maximum run-up height of 16 feet (5 m) along the opposite shore of the lake.	
April–August 1953	Franklin D. Roosevelt Lake, Washington, United States				0	A series of landslides at Reed Terrace generated tsunamis at least 11 times. The largest of them reached a maximum height of 65 feet (19.8 m) along the opposite shore of the lake and was observed as far as 6 miles (9.7 km) away.	
7 Oct 1953	Bekkelaget, Oslo, Norway	Bekkelaget landslide 1953			5 dead		
12 Jul 1954	Media Luna, Colombia	Santa Elena landslide			>100	Mudflow triggered by heavy rain	
26 Oct 1954	Salerno, Amalfi Coast				≈ 300	504 millimetres (19.8 in) of rain fell in 16 hours, causing soil slides & debris flows	
1958	Shizuoka Prefecture, Japan	Kanogawa landslides			1,094	19,754 homes were destroyed or badly damaged.	
9 Jul 1958	Lituya Bay, Alaska, United States	1958 Lituya Bay, Alaska earthquake and megatsunami		30 MCM	2	Caused by M 7.5 earthquake, the landslide caused a megatsunami with a run-up of 524 metres (1,719 ft) in Lituya Bay.	
17 Aug 1959	Madison Canyon, southwestern Montana, United States	1959 Hebgen Lake earthquake		38 MCM	28–36	Caused by M 7.2 to 7.5 earthquake. Dammed the Madison River, creating Quake Lake.	
22 May 1960	Riñihue Lake, Chile	Riñihuazo	39.84°S 072.29°W	≈ 40 MCM		A series of landslides triggered by the 1960 Valdivia earthquake, blocked outflow of Riñihue Lake, causing it to rise more than 20 metres (66 ft), actions taken to lower the water level prevented repeat of a disastrous flood after the great 1575 earthquake.	
10 Jan 1962	Ranrahirca, Peru	1962 Nevado Huascarán debris avalanche	09.12°S 077.6°W	13 MCM	4,000 – 5,000	An avalanche of ice and rock triggered by collapse of part of a hanging glacier	
9 Oct 1963	Longarone, Italy	Vajont landslide	46.27°N 012.33°E	270 MCM	≈ 2,000	Landslide caused by heavy rains and drawdown of the Vajont Dam reservoir. Casualties and damage caused by 250-metre (820 ft) tsunami generated by landslide into reservoir.	
27 Mar 1964	Seward, Alaska, United States	1964 Alaska earthquake		211 MCM at Seward, 9.6 MCM at Turnagain Heights	106 from tsunami caused by Seward landslide	M 9.2 earthquake caused submarine landslide at Seward, and large landslides in Anchorage. One large landslide traveled for 3 miles (4.8 km) across the nearly level surface of Sherman Glacier	
9 Jan 1965	British Columbia	Hope Slide	49.40°N 121.26°W	48 MCM	4	"... no seismic or hydrometeorological trigger is discernible ..."	
28 Mar 1965	El Cobre, Chile	El Cobre landslide			>200	Shaking from a magnitude 7.1 earthquake caused failure of two tailings dams at the El Soldado copper mine, the resulting flow destroyed the town of El Cobre.	
1965	Luquan Yi and Miao Autonomous County, Yunnan, China	Pufu Landslide		450 MCM		Created a dam on the Pufuguo Stream, which later failed	
21 Oct 1966	Aberfan, Wales	Aberfan disaster	51.69°N 003.35°W		144	Collapse of an unstable colliery spoil-tip built over a series of springs, was triggered by heavy rain, killing nearly half the children at the village school.	
18 Feb 1967	Laranjeiras, Rio de Janeiro		22.97°S 043.20°W		110	Worst single event in a series of landslides caused by very heavy rain in the area around Rio de Janeiro in the summers of 1966 and 1967. A high-velocity debris avalanche struck three buildings, two of them apartment buildings. The preceding rainfall fell at up to 100 millimetres (3.9 in) per hour.	
18 Mar 1967	Caraguatatuba, Brazil		23.85°S 046.63°W	7.6 MCM	120	Followed heavy rain, 420 millimetres (17 in) in 24 hours.	
9 Jul 1967	Kure, Hiroshima Prefecture, Japan		34.25°N 132.57°E		159	Heavy rain from Typhoon Billie caused flooding and many landslides, destroying 352 buildings and damaging 551 roads	
18 Aug 1968	Hida River, Gero, Japan		35.45°N 137.05°E	740 MCM (official estimate)	104	Triggered by a rainstorm, this debris flow swept two buses off the road, where they were stopped because of an earlier landslide	
3–5 Oct 1968	Darjeeling, India				'thousands'	Floods caused by rainfall of 500 to 1,000 millimetres (20 to 39 in), triggered many landslides, a 60-kilometre-long (37 mi) highway was cut in 92 places	
19–20 Aug 1969	Nelson County, Virginia, United States				150 (includes deaths from flooding)	Remnants of Hurricane Camille dropped at least 710 millimetres (28 in) of rain in about 8 hours, triggering numerous debris flows	
31 May 1970	Yungay, Peru	1970 Huascarán debris avalanche	09.12°S 077.6°W	50–100 MCM	>22,000	Triggered by the 1970 Ancash earthquake, the mass travelled 14.5 kilometres (9 mi) at an average velocity of about 300 km/h (186 mph) and buried Yungay	
18 Mar 1971	Chungar, Peru	Chungar avalanche and tsunami	11.12°S 076.53°W	0.1 MCM	400–600	A rock avalanche from a limestone outcrop fell into Yanawayin Lake causing a wave that devastated a mining camp	
4 May 1971	Saint-Jean-Vianney, Quebec, Canada	Saint-Jean-Vianney landslide	48.47°N 071.22°W	6.9 MCM	31	This slide occurred in quick clay following heavy rain, destroying 41 homes	
18 Jun 1972	Hong Kong	1972 Hong Kong landslides			156	A series of major landslides in which several apartment complexes and houses were wiped out	
6 Jul 1972	Amakusa, Japan	Amakusa disaster			115	Multiple slope failures caused by heavy rainfall	
12–13 Jul 1972	Obara, Shikoku, Japan	Obara landslides			64	218 millimetres (8.6 in) of rain in 5 hours triggered many landslides	
Apr 1974	Junín Region, Peru	Mayunmarca Landslide		1.0–1.6 km^{3}	450	Rockslide dammed Río Mantaro. Slide velocity estimated at 120 to 140 km/h (75 to 87 mph).	
22 Jul 1975	Mount Meager massif, British Columbia, Canada	Devastation Glacier landslide		0.013 km^{3}	4	Triggered by the collapse of a glacially debuttressed slope, descended Devastation Creek.	

=== 1976–2000 ===
Note: MCM = million cubic metres

Date	Place	Name/article	Position	Volume	Casualties	Comments	Sources
30 Nov 1977	Tuve, Gothenburg, Sweden	Tuve landslide	57.75°N 011.94°E	3–4 MCM	9	The most severe landslide in the modern history of Sweden, triggered by heavy rain	
29 Apr 1978	Botn in Rissa Municipality, Norway	Rissa landslide	63.55°N 009.94°E	5–6 MCM	1	Quick clay flowed suddenly into Botn lake, causing a small tsunami on the opposite shore	
8 Aug 1979	Abbotsford, Dunedin, South Island, New Zealand	1979 Abbotsford landslip	45.897°S 170.435°E	5 MCM	0	Heavy rain triggered a landslide on an unstable slope, made worse by sand quarrying at the base of the slope, destroying 69 houses	
18 May 1980	Mount St. Helens, Washington, United States	1980 eruption of Mount St. Helens	46.200278°N 122.186667°W	2.9 km^{3}	57	The largest landslide in recorded history. Unplugged the volcanic vent, triggering the eruption. Deaths were from both the landslide and the eruption. Part of the landslide entered Spirit Lake, generating a megatsunami that reached a height of 260 metres (850 ft).	
1982	Santa Cruz Mountains, California, United States				30	A series of mud and debris flows occurred over a wide area.	
Apr 1983	Thistle, Utah, United States	Thistle, Utah landslide	40.00°N 111.50°W	~15 MCM	0	Costliest landslide in United States history; damage estimated at $200–400 million (1983 dollars). Landslide formed lake over 160 feet (49 m) deep before draining.	
5 Oct 1985	Portugués Urbano district, Ponce, Puerto Rico	Mameyes landslide			129	120 houses destroyed, greatest death toll in United States history from a single landslide.	
13 Nov 1985	Armero, Tolima Department, Colombia	Armero tragedy	05.03°S 074.88°W		23,000	A minor eruption of the Nevado del Ruiz volcano caused melting of its ice cap. This released a series of lahars, volcanic mudflows, that traveled at speeds of up to 50 km/h (31 mph) down the slopes of the volcano. These lahars swiftly moved into valleys, merging to form larger flows, one of which destroyed the town of Armero.	
28 Jul 1987	Valtellina, Lombardy, Italian Alps	Val Pola landslide		34 MCM	29	Triggered by rapid erosion at the base of a mountain slope, created a wave that travelled 2.7 kilometres (1.7 mi) upstream.	
6 Sep 1988	Morobe Province, Papua New Guinea	Kaiapit landslide		1.8 km^{3}	74		
14 Dec 1991	Aoraki / Mount Cook, Southern Alps, New Zealand	Aoraki / Mount Cook rock avalanche	43.59°S 170.14°E	12 MCM	0	Reduced the height of New Zealand's highest mountain by approximately 10 metres (33 ft).	
3–5 Jun 1993	Scarborough, North Yorkshire, United Kingdom	Holbeck Hall Hotel landslide		~0.5 MCM	0	Classic rotational failure along sea cliffs, resulting court case set important precedent in English law	
21 Oct 1993	Pantai Remis, Perak, Malaysia	Pantai Remis landslide			0	Slope failure of an open pit tin mine near the sea resulted in forming a new cove measuring approximately 0.5 by 0.5 kilometres (0.3 by 0.3 mi).	
4 Mar 1995	La Conchita, California, United States	La Conchita Landslide of 1995		1.3 MCM	0		
30 Jul 1997	Thredbo, New South Wales, Australia	1997 Thredbo landslide			18	A leaking water pipe caused a slope failure that destroyed a ski lodge	
1998–1999	Kelso, Washington, United States	Aldercrest-Banyon landslide			0	Slow-moving landslide which resulted in the condemnation of 137 houses, and $40 million in damage.	
14–16 Dec 1999	Vargas, Venezuela	Vargas tragedy			30,000	Caused by a heavy storm that deposited 911 millimetres (35.9 in) of rain in a few days	
12 Jul 2000	Mumbai, India	2000 Mumbai landslide	19.09°N 072.90°E		78	Caused by land erosion following heavy rains and flooding	

== 21st-century landslides ==
=== 2001–2010 ===
Note: m^{3} = cubic metre(s); MCM = million cubic metres

Date	Place	Name/article	Position	Volume	Casualties	Comments	Sources
9 Nov 2001	Amboori, Kerala, India				40	Supposedly worst landslide in Kerala state's history.	
26 Mar 2004	Mount Bawakaraeng, South Sulawesi, Indonesia			200–300 MCM	32	Landslide caused by collapse of caldera wall	
10 Jan 2005	La Conchita, California, United States	2005 La Conchita landslide		0.2 MCM	10	Remobilization of colluvium from 1995 slide into a debris flow.	
17 Feb 2006	Southern Leyte, Philippines	2006 Southern Leyte mudslide		15 MCM	1,126	Rock-debris avalanche triggered by ten-day period of heavy rain	
3 Jun 2007	Valley of Geysers, Kamchatka Peninsula, Russia				0	A landslide of mud, snow, rock, and trees 1.5 kilometres (0.9 mi) long, 200 metres (656 ft) wide, and 60 metres (197 ft) deep buried two-thirds of the valley, creating a thermal lake and burying or inundating many geysers, thermal pools, and waterfalls.	
11 Jun 2007	Chittagong, Bangladesh	2007 Chittagong mudslides			123	Series of landslides caused by illegal hillside cutting and monsoon rains	
24 July 2007	Mount Steele, Yukon Territory, Canada	Mount Steele		108 MCM	0	A 400 m (1,312 ft) wide section of ice and rock fell from the north face of Mount Steele onto Steele Glacier. Reaching 252 km/h (157 mph), it traveled 5.76 km (3.58 mi). One of the largest recorded landslides in western Canada.	
4 December 2007	Mount Orrock, British Columbia, Canada			3 MCM	0	A rockslide and debris avalanche slid 550 metres (1,804 ft) down the side of Mount Orrock on the western shore of Chehalis Lake into the 175-metre (574 ft) deep lake, generating a tsunami with a run-up height of 37.8 metres (124 ft) on the opposite shore and 6.3 metres (21 ft) at the lake's exit point, 7.5 kilometres (4.7 mi) away to the south.	
6 Sep 2008	Cairo, Egypt	2008 Cairo landslide			119	Rockfall from cliffs, individual boulders up to 70 tonnes	
16 Jan 2009	Franklin D. Roosevelt Lake, Washington, United States				0	A section of the shoreline about 17 acres (6.9 ha) in area adjacent to the mouth of the Spokane River collapsed into the lake, generating a tsunami which reached a maximum height of 30 feet (9 m) along the opposite shore 1,000 yards (910 m) away.	
9 Aug 2009	Siaolin Village, Kaohsiung, Taiwan	Siaolin mudslide		30–45 MCM	439–600	Resulted from Typhoon Morakot.	
25 Aug 2009	Franklin D. Roosevelt Lake, Washington, United States				0	A section of a hillside collapsed into the lake, generating a tsunami which reached a maximum height of 12 feet (3.7 m) along the opposite shore less than 1,000 yards (910 m) away, where it struck a campground. A number of people were washed into the lake, but all survived.	
1 Sep 2009	Karrat Fjord, Greenland	Karrat 2009 rock avalanche	71°38′20″N 052°19′16″W	2.8 MCM	0	The landslide on the south-facing slope of the mountain Ummiammakku registered as a magnitude 2.7 seismic event. It did not reach the sea, so no tsunami occurred.	
4 Jan 2010	Attabad, Gilgit-Baltistan, Pakistan	Hunza Valley landslide		30 MCM	20	Formed Attabad Lake by damming Hunza River, blocked Karakoram Highway	
20 Feb 2010	Madeira Island, Portugal	2010 Madeira floods and mudslides			42		
1 Mar 2010	Bududa District, Uganda	2010 Ugandan landslide			100–300		
25 Apr 2010	Qidu District, Keelung, Taiwan	2010 Keelung Landslide		0.21 MCM	4	The landside was caused without any possible reason, blocked National Freeway NO.3, buried 3 cars and killed 4 people.	
10 May 2010	Saint-Jude, Quebec				4		
23 May 2010	Jiang Zhidong Jiangxi, China	2010 Jiangxi derailment			0	The landslide was caused by previous days of heavy rain and flooding in the region.	
6 Aug 2010	Mount Meager, British Columbia, Canada	Meager landslide		48.5 MCM	0	Comparable in volume to the 1965 Hope Slide	
8 Aug 2010	Gansu, China	2010 Gansu mudslide			1,287		

=== 2011–2020 ===
Note: MCM = million cubic metres

Date	Place	Name/article	Position	Volume	Casualties	Comments	Sources
8 Oct 2011	Iron County, Utah, United States		37.63°N 112.94°W	3.1 MCM	0	Covered 1,300 feet (396 m) of Utah State Route 14.	
10 Apr 2013	Salt Lake City, Utah, United States	Bingham Canyon Mine landslide	40.523°N 112.151°W	55 MCM	0	Possibly the largest historic, non-volcanic, terrestrial landslide in North America.	
16 Jun 2013	Kedarnath, Uttarakhand, India	2013 North India floods			5,700		
13 Dec 2013	Rockville, Utah, United States				2	Single boulder weighing several hundred tons crushed a two-storey home with residents inside.	
16 Feb 2014	Mount La Perouse, Alaska, United States		58.542°N 137.01°W		0	A 68,000,000-short-ton (61,000,000-long-ton; 62,000,000 t) landslide traveled 7.4 kilometres (4.6 mi), depositing a layer of debris up to 40 feet (12.2 m) deep.	
22 Mar 2014	Oso, Washington, United States	2014 Oso mudslide	48.283°N 121.847°W	10 MCM (early estimate)	43	49 structures destroyed or affected	
2 May 2014	Argo District, Badakhshan Province, Afghanistan	2014 Badakhshan mudslides			350–2,700 reported	4,000 people displaced (as of 4 May 2014)	
25 May 2014	Mesa County, Colorado, United States	2014 West Salt Creek landslide	39°10′07″N 107°50′54″W	54.5 MCM	3	Largest landslide in Colorado's history, occurred 30 miles (48 km) east of Grand Junction.	
30 Jul 2014	Malin, Ambegaon taluka, Pune district, Maharashtra, India	2014 Malin landslide	19°09′40″N 073°41′18″E		136	100+ missing	
2 Aug 2014	Sunkoshi, Sindhupalchok District, Nepal	2014 Sunkoshi blockage		5.5 MCM	156+		
20 Aug 2014	Hiroshima Prefecture, Japan	2014 Hiroshima landslides			74	Deadliest landslides in Japan in 42 years	
29 Oct 2014	Badulla District, Sri Lanka	2014 Badulla landslide			16+	192 missing and presumed dead	
13 Dec 2014	Jemblung village, Java, Indonesia	2014 Indonesia landslide			93	23 missing	
23 Apr 2015	Badakhshan Province, Afghanistan	2015 Badakhshan landslides			52		
28 Apr 2015	Salvador, Bahia, Brazil	2015 Bahia landslide			14		
18 May 2015	Salgar, Antioquia Department Colombia	2015 Colombian landslide			83 dead; 30+ missing (as of 20 May 2015)		
11 Aug 2015	Saint Elias Mountains, Alaska, U.S.				0	40 million metric tons of rock fell onto the surface of Turner Glacier.	
1 Oct 2015	El Cambray Dos, Guatemala Department, Guatemala	2015 Guatemala landslide			280 dead; 70 missing.		
11 Oct 2015	Mount Steele, Yukon Territory, Canada			20 MCM	0	45 million metric tons of rock, snow, and ice, slid 1 kilometre (0.6 mi) down the mountainside and 2 kilometres (1.2 mi) across the surface of Steele Glacier.	
17 Oct 2015	Taan Fiord, Icy Bay, Alaska, United States	Icy Bay (Alaska)		76 MCM	0	Mountainside weakened by glacial retreat collapsed, dumping 200,000,000 short tons (180,000,000 long tons; 180,000,000 t) of debris onto foot of Tyndall Glacier and into Taan Fiord, generating a 100-meter (328 ft) megatsunami with a run-up of 193 meters (633 ft).	
13 Nov 2015	Lidong Village, Zhejiang, China				38		
21 Nov 2015	Hpakant, Myanmar	2015 Hpakant jade mine disaster			113 dead; more than 100 missing	A 60-metre (197 ft) man-made heap of waste soil mined out of a nearby jade mine collapsed, burying about 70 huts in a nearby village.	
28 Jun 2016	Glacier Bay National Park, Alaska, U.S.			62.0 to 77.8 MCM	0	A 1,200-meter (3,900 ft) mountainside collapsed, dropping 120,000,000 metric tons (132,000,000 short tons) of rock and debris onto Lamplugh Glacier above the head of Johns Hopkins Inlet, leaving a 9-kilometer (5.6 mi) long debris field on the glacier.	
15 Nov 2016	Karrat Fjord, Greenland	Karrat 2016 rock avalanche	71°38′24″N 052°19′41″W	3 MCM	0	The landslide on the south-facing slope of the mountain Ummiammakku registered as a magnitude 2.1 seismic event. No tsunami is known to have occurred.	
2 Apr 2017	Mocoa, Colombia	2017 Mocoa landslide	01°09′00″N 076°38′51″W		329+	70 missing, third-deadliest weather-related disaster in Colombian history.	
12 Jun 2017	Rangamati, Chittagong and Bandarban, Bangladesh	2017 Bangladesh landslides	22°38′00″N 092°12′00″E		152	Worst landslides in Bangladesh's history.	
17 Jun 2017	Nuugaatsiaq, Greenland	2017 Karrat Fjord landslide	71°32′06″N 053°12′45″W		4	Probably because of melting ice that destabilized the rock, 35,000,000 to 58,000,000 cubic metres (46,000,000 to 76,000,000 cu yd) of rock on the mountain Ummiammakku fell from an elevation of roughly 1,000 metres (3,280 ft) into the waters of the Karrat Fjord in northeastern Greenland, causing a tsunami with an initial wave height of 90 to 100 m (295 to 328 ft). The wave struck the village of Nuugaatsiaq 20 km (12.4 mi) away, where the run-up was 9 metres (30 ft) and the wave swept 11 buildings into the sea and killed four people. An evacuation of 170 residents of Nuugaatsiaq and Illorsuit followed because of a danger of additional landslides and waves. The tsunami was noted at settlements as far as 100 kilometres (62 mi) away.	
24 Jun 2017	Xinmo village, Mao County, Sichuan Province, southwestern China	2017 Xinmo landslide	32°04′N 103°39′E	Depletion volume: 4.26 MCM Accumulation volume: 13.25 MCM	10 dead; 73 missing	Probably triggered by the failure of a rock mass previously weakened by the Mw 7.3 Diexi earthquake in 1933 and weathered, after a rainy season.	
14 Aug 2017	Freetown, Sierra Leone	2017 Sierra Leone mudslides	008°29′N 013°14′W		1,141+	Triggered by a particularly wet rainy season	
9 Jan 2018	California, United States	2018 South California landslides	34°03′N 118°15′W		20	Occurred several months after a series of major wildfires devastated nearby areas, causing deforestation and increasing the risk of a landslide.	
22 Dec 2018	Anak Krakatau, Indonesia	2018 Sunda Strait tsunami		150 MCM	426 dead, 25 missing, 14,059 injured	About 64 hectares (160 acres) of the southwest flank of the island slid into the Sunda Strait during a volcanic eruption, reducing the height of the volcano from 338 to 110 metres (1,109 to 361 ft). The resulting tsunami struck the coasts of Java and Sumatra with a height ranging from 2 metres (6.6 ft) to 13.4 metres (44 ft).	
22 Apr 2019	Hpakant, Myanmar				50–57 dead	Mudslide at jade mine buried victims under 30 metres (98 ft) of debris.	
28 Jul 2019	Hpakant, Myanmar				14 dead; 4 missing	Landslide at jade mine triggered by heavy rain.	
9 Aug 2019	Mottama, Paung Township, Myanmar				70 dead	Triggered by torrential rain. Destroyed 27 houses in the Thae Phyu Kone village tract of Mottama.	
4–23 Dec 2019	Nyempundu, Gikomero and Rukombe, Cibitoke Province, northwestern Burundi	2019 Burundi landslides	02.8103°S 029.1856°E		41+ dead, ~10 missing	Triggered by unseasonably heavy rains across East Africa due to the Indian Ocean being warmer than usual, partly as result of cyclical weather phenomenons and warming oceans.	
3 Jun 2020	Alta, Norway	Alta landslide	70.0305°N 023.0706°E		0	Liquefaction of quick clay in coastal location swept eight houses into the sea. Slide was 650 m (2,133 ft) wide by up to 140 m (459 ft) deep.	
2 July 2020	Hpakant area in Myanmar	2020 Hpakant jade mine disaster			175+ dead	Triggered by heavy rain, killing jade stone collectors.	
7 August 2020	Pettimudi, Rajamalai, Munnar, Idukki Kerala India	2020 Pettimudi landslide	10.163309°N 077.013144°E		66+ dead	Following a red alert issued by the India Meteorological Department (IMD)- of heavy to very heavy rainfall in parts of Kerala, torrential rains pounded Idukki district, resulting in a major landslide. Several estate workers of a tea plantation were feared trapped.	
21 November 2020	Paatuut, Greenland			90 MCM	0	260,000,000 tons of rock fell from an elevation of 1,000 to 1,400 metres (3,300 to 4,600 ft) reaching a speed of 140 kilometres per hour (87 mph). The event registered as a magnitude 2.3 seismic event. About 30,000,000 m^{3} (39,000,000 cu yd) of material with a mass of 87,000,000 tons entered Sullorsuaq Strait (known in Danish as Vaigat Strait), generating a megatsunami. The wave had a run-up height of 50 metres (164 ft) near the landslide and 28 metres (92 ft) at Qullissat, the site of an abandoned settlement across the strait on Disko Island, 20 kilometres (11 nmi; 12 mi) away. Refracted energy from the tsunami created a wave with a run-up height of 3 metres (9.8 ft) that destroyed boats at the closest populated village, Saqqaq, 40 kilometres (25 mi) from the landslide.	
28 November 2020	Elliot Creek, British Columbia Canada			18 MCM	0	Unseasonably heavy rainfall triggered a landslide into a glacial lake at the head of Elliot Creek, generating a magnitude 5.0 earthquake and a 100 m (330 ft) high megatsunami that rushed down Elliot Creek and the Southgate River to the head of Bute Inlet, covering a total distance of over 60 km (37 mi). The wave destroyed over 8.5 km (5.3 mi) of salmon habitat along Elliot Creek.	
30 December 2020	Gjerdrum Municipality, Norway	2020 Gjerdrum landslide	60.064612°N 011.036005°E	1.4–2.1 MCM (estimated)	10 dead.	In 2005, one report called the area where the landslide later occurred a "high-risk zone".	

=== 2021–present ===
Note: MCM = million cubic metres

Date	Place	Name/article	Position	Volume	Casualties	Comments	Sources
13 June 2021	Assapaat, Greenland		70°19′09″N 052°59′48″W	18.3–25.9 MCM	0	Unwitnessed combination frozen debris avalanche and rock landslide from an elevation of 600 to 880 metres (2,000 to 2,900 ft) on the south coast of the Nuussuaq Peninsula. About 3,900,000 cubic metres (5,100,000 cu yd) of material entered Sullorsuaq Strait (also known as Vaigat Strait) but did not generate a tsunami.	
3 July 2021	Atami, Japan	2021 Atami mudslide		0.07 MCM embankment lost (official estimate)	27 dead	According to Japan Fire and Disaster Management Agency and Meteorological Agency of Japan official report, total 70,000 cubic meters embankment push for many houses and utility poles were collapsed on residential area, due total 411 to 442 millimeters (16.18 to 16.65 inches) precipitation on surroundings area from 1 to 3 July.	
15 February 2022	Petrópolis, Rio de Janeiro, Brazil	2022 Petrópolis floods			231 dead		
30 June 2022	Noney district, Manipur, India	2022 Manipur landslide			58 dead	At least nine missing.	
29 October 2022	Maguindanao del Norte, Philippines				at most 63 dead	From Tropical Storm Nalgae; Death toll is for the whole Bangsamoro region. At least 155 died nationwide	
23 November 2022	Esposende, Portugal	Palmeira de Faro landslide	41°32′41.1″N 008°44′11.8″W		2 dead	The slope was excavated in a granite rock mass, with the instability being strongly influenced by the rock's structural characteristics.	
26 November 2022	Ischia, Italy	2022 Ischia landslide			12 dead	From heavy rain	
16 December 2022	Batang Kali, Selangor, Malaysia	2022 Batang Kali landslide	03°25′24″N 101°45′14″E	0.45 MCM	31 dead	A farm filed an application to begin organic farming activities in 2019 but had operated a campsite on the farm since 2020 without a license, required for campsites near high-risk areas, such as rivers, hillslopes or waterfalls.	
23 September 2023	Stenungsund motorway junction, Västra Götalands län (region), Sweden	2023 Stenungsund landslide	58°03′31.6″N 011°52′45.7″E		3 injured	Quick clay landslide destroyed E6 motorway and a nearby parking with fast food restaurant and fuel station. Nine passenger cars and a bus ran into the mudslide, causing 3 injuries. It took several months before cars and trucks could be safely dug out of the mudslide. Traffic between Gothenburg and Oslo remained interrupted until the 5th of July 2024.	
20 November 2023	near Wrangell, Alaska				6 dead	A landslide buried homes and a portion of the Zimovia Highway in a remote area in Southeast Alaska 11 miles (18 km) south of Wrangell, killing a family of five and their adult neighbor. The slide was 450 feet (137.2 m) wide when it crossed the highway. About 20 people were rescued from the area.	
22 January 2024	Liangshui, Yunnan Province, China				44 dead	A landslide originating from a steep clifftop area buried homes at the base of a slop in a remote village.	
6 February 2024	Maco, Davao de Oro, Philippines	2024 Maco landslide	7°23′32.2″N 126°01′45.2″E		92 dead 32 injured 36 missing	Heavy rain triggered a landslide almost two stories tall which slid about 700 metres (2,300 ft) down a steep mountainside and buried an area of approximately 9.8 hectares (24 acres) – including 62 houses, the barangay hall of Masara, a transport terminal, three busses, and a jeepney – and blocking a tributary of the Hijo River, raising the potential for flash flooding.	
24 May 2024	Maip Muritaka Rural LLG, Enga Province, Papua New Guinea	2024 Enga landslide	05.246°S 143.261°E		160–2,000 dead (estimated); 2,500+ missing	A landslide buried six villages at around 03:00 PGT.	
12 July 2024	Simaltal, Chitwan District, Nepal				63 missing	A landslide in Simaltal swept two buses from the Narayanghat-Mugling highway into a river.	
30 July 2024	Wayanad district, Kerala, India	2024 Wayanad landslides	11°46′54.4″N 076°13′57.6″E	0.086 MCM	443+ killed 397+ injured 118+ missing	Multiple landslides occurred in Wayanad district, Kerala, India resulting in the deaths of at least 443 with 397 injures and 118 still missing.	
7 August 2024	Pederson Glacier, Alaska, United States		59.9038°N 149.8246°W	2 MCM	0	The landslide traveled down a southwest-facing slope north of Pederson Glacier southwest of Seward, Alaska, then along the glacier itself and into Upper Pederson Lagoon, where it generated a tsunami with a maximum run-up height of 17 metres (56 ft) along the eastern shore. The wave continued into Lower Pederson Lagoon, where it had a height of 1 metre (3 ft 3 in).	
28 May 2025	Blatten, Switzerland	2025 Blatten glacier collapse	46.416667°N 7.816667°E	3 MCM	1	A massive rock and glacier slide from the Bietschhorn region buried and destroyed large parts of the village. The village had been evacuated since 19 May 2025.	
10 August 2025	Tracy Arm, Alaska, United States	2025 Tracy Arm landslide and tsunami	57.840°N 133.060°W	100 MCM	0	A massive landslide occurred on the north slope of Tracy Arm adjacent to the terminus of South Sawyer Glacier. Some or most of the material entered the waters of Tracy Arm, generating a megatsunami with a run-up height of 470 to 500 metres (1,542 to 1,640 ft) on the shore directly opposite the landslide and of at least 30 metres (98 ft) at nearby Sawyer Island in Tracy Arm. At Harbour Island at the mouth of Tracy Arm, waves reached an estimated height of 3 metres (10 ft) to 4.6 metres (15 ft) and water rose at least 25 feet (7.6 m) above the high tide line.	
30 August 2025	Nesvatnet, lakeshore in Levanger Municipality, Norway	2025 Nesvatnet landslide	63.65352°N 11.09123°E		1	A quick clay landslide killed a Danish railway construction worker and destroyed both the Nordland Line railway and two roads (old and new European route E6) that normally would function as Norway's north-south transport backbone.	
31 August 2025	Tarasin, Marrah Mountains, Sudan	2025 Tarasin landslide	13.04027°N 24.38638°E		1,000+ killed	A landslide caused by heavy rain completely destroyed the village of Tarasin, killing all of the estimated 1,000 residents.	
26 January 2026	Niscemi, Sicily, Italy	2026 Niscemi landslide	37.14°N 14.38°E			The landslide was caused by several days of heavy rain, as Storm Harry hit Europe.	
23 May 2026	Canacassala, Bengo Province, Angola	2026 Angola gold mine landslide	8.21°S 14.23°E		28	A landslide struck and buried an unauthorized gold mine operation in Angola in the early morning, killing 28 workers.	

== Ongoing landslides ==
Note: MCM = million cubic metres

Dates	Place	Name/article	Position	Volume	Casualties	Comments	Sources
Since 1916	Petacciato, Molise, Italy	Petacciato landslide					
1920–now Discovered in 2020	Prince William Sound, Alaska, United States	Barry Arm landslide	61.9°N 148.9°W	500 MCM		Ongoing landslide along a steep slope of the Barry Arm fjord. In mid-2020, the landslide began moving at a rate of 1.6–2.7 in (41–69 mm) per day, twice as fast as in 2008. A possible failure of the entire slide could trigger megatsunami waves up to 300 m (980 ft) high.	
1950–now	Siguas Valley and Vitor valley, Peru			12 landslides of 20–80 MCM		Destroying critical international highway and river valleys below. Irrigation of arid plateaus, expansion of farmland definitive cause of long-term moving slides.	
Rediscovered in 1983	Åkerneset, Norway			18–54 MCM		Ca. 2 metres (6.6 ft) wide in 1983, a 500-metre (1,640 ft)-long crack in the slope of the mountain Åkerneset is widening 4 centimetres (1.6 in) per year. Moving slab of rock is at elevation of 150 to 900 metres (490 to 2,950 ft) and is 62 metres (203 ft) thick. Eventual catastrophic collapse into Sunnylvsfjorden could generate megatsunamis of 35 to 100 metres (115 to 328 ft) in height.	
Monitored since 2010	Troms, Norway		69.137°N 020.103°E	1.3–70 MCM		The Váráš rock slope deformation in the valley Signaldalen in northern Norway is 85 to 100 metres (279 to 328 ft) thick and moving at up to 15 millimetres (0.6 in) per year.	

== See also ==
- List of avalanches by death toll
