= North Arch volcanic field =

Underwater volcanic field north of Oahu, Hawaii

Geography of North Arch volcanic field
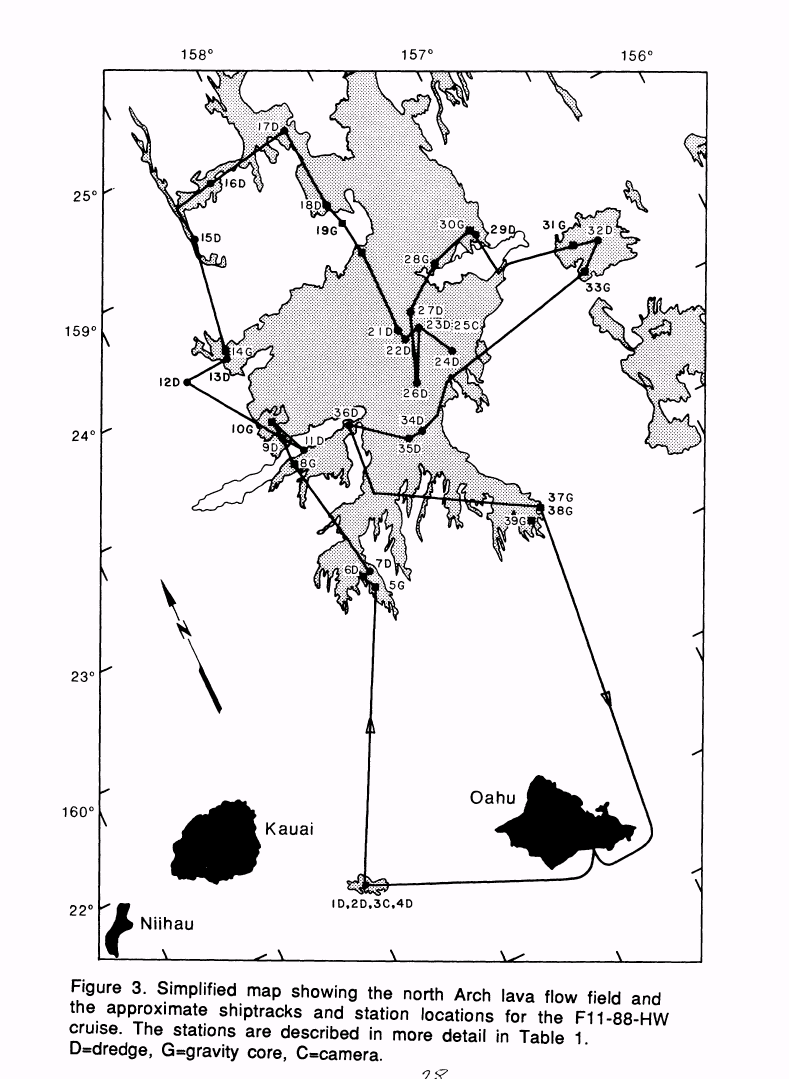
- Map of the North Arch volcanic field, with Oahu and sampling sites marked
- Coordinates: 24°N 158°W
- Area
  - Total: 25,000 km^{2} (9,700 sq mi)
  - Land: 0%
  - Water: 100%
- Highest point: 3,900 m (12,800 ft) below sealevel
- Lowest point: 4,700 m (15,400 ft) below sealevel
- Terrain: Basalt flow with other volcanic features such as cones

North Arch volcanic field (Note: The name is a reference to this position and also to differentiate it from the South Arch volcanic field.) is an underwater volcanic field north of Oahu, Hawaii. It covers an area of about 25,000 square kilometres (9,700 sq mi) and consists of large expanses of alkali basalt, basanite and nephelinite that form extensive lava flows and volcanic cones. Some lava flows are longer than 100 kilometres (62 mi).

This volcanic field appears to be somehow related to the Hawaii hotspot, although the exact mechanisms are debated. Similar volcanic units are also found on the adjacent islands, such as the Honolulu Volcanics on Oahu. The volcanic field was formed through effusive and explosive eruptions between 1.5 and 0.5 million years ago, although eruptions before and after these dates also took place.

== Geography and geomorphology ==
The North Arch volcanic field lies 200–400 kilometres (120–250 mi) north of Oahu at 3,900–4,380 metres (12,800–14,370 ft) depth; within the Exclusive Economic Zone of the Hawaiian Islands. The existence of lava flows in this geological region was already postulated in 1964, but it was GLORIA sidescan sonar eventually identified an anomalously reflective seafloor that constitutes the North Arch volcanic field; the discovery was first published in 1968 and rock samples taken in 1988. The volcanic field lies on the Hawaiian Arch (Note: The Hawaiian Arch is a 0.2 kilometres (0.12 mi) high ridge that formed through the flexure induced by the weight of the Hawaiian Islands and is accompanied by a trough.) and on its southern slope.

The volcanic field covers an area of about 25,000 square kilometres (9,700 sq mi) (Note: In turn, it appears to be part of an even larger field that covers 150,000 square kilometres (58,000 sq mi).) and consists of about 100 observed volcanic cones with associated lava flows. The volcanic cones range from shield-like to steep to lava dome-like and long ridges and lava flows range from lava lakes forming flat-topped cones to over 100 kilometres (62 mi) long lava flows despite the flat terrain; small hills in the lava flows may be vents. The average thickness of the lava flows probably amounts to either less than 10 metres (33 ft) or about 40–50 metres (130–160 ft). Fissure vents also occur in the field; one of these has been the source of a 3,600 square kilometres (1,400 sq mi) lava flow. Owing to the sizes of the lava flows, the field has also been called a flood basalt in analogy to its usually much larger continent-based counterparts. The volcanoes are located among Cretaceous seamounts and sediment-covered seafloor, which forms kipukas between the lava flows. In turn, lava flows are covered with over 1 metre (3 ft 3 in) thick sediments. A noticeable swell where clusters of volcanic cones occur may reflect the presence of sills. The total volume of the volcanic field is about 1,250–1,000 cubic kilometres (300–240 cu mi), much less than a typical Hawaiian shield stage volcano, and rocks occur in the form of e.g. glass shards, pillow lavas, scoria and volcaniclastic material. A seismic velocity anomaly at depth appears to be associated with the North Arch volcanic field.

== Geology ==
The bulk of the volcanism of a Hawaiian volcano is made up by the shield stage during which tholeiitic lavas are erupted. This stage is after between 250,000 – 2,500,000 years followed by a "post-erosional" or "rejuvenated" stage during which lavas of alkali basalt, melilitite and nephelinite composition; such volcanism has been observed on Koolau, Kauai and Niihau and covers large parts of the Hawaiian Islands even though it makes up less than one percent of their volume. The North Arch volcanic rocks resemble the composition of these rejuvenated stage volcanics of Hawaii such as the Honolulu Volcanics, and another unit of these volcanics forms the South Arch volcanic field 200 kilometres (120 mi) south of Kilauea, and have been deemed "peripheral lavas" of the Hawaii hotspot. In fact, it has been proposed that the rejuvenated volcanics of Niihau, Kauai, Oahu and Molokai might actually be part of the North Arch volcanic field. Other volcanic units of a probably similar nature have been found between Oahu and Kauai.

=== Origin ===
While the shield stage volcanics of Hawaii are linked to the mantle plume, the origin of volcanism in the North Arch volcanic field is debated:

- Low-degree melting of garnet lherzolite.
- The flexure of the crust under the weight of the Hawaiian volcanoes forms the Hawaiian Arch, where the crust breaks up and melts can concentrate; this would provide both pathways and sources for magma to ascend to the surface.
- Magma ascent along fissures associated with the Molokai fracture zone.
- Changes in lithosphere thickness associated with the Molokai Fracture Zone.
- Development and spreading of a refractory mantle root underneath the Hawaii hotspot.
- Secondary convection away from the main mantle plume.

The volcanism of the North Arch volcanic field might nevertheless have a common cause as the rejuvenated stage volcanism of Hawaiian Islands. Volcanic units interpreted similarly to the North Arch volcanic field are also known from Kerguelen.

=== Composition ===
Samples taken from the North Arch volcanic field are fine grained or glassy with varying quantities of vesicles and consist of alkali basalt, basanite and nephelinite, with variable chlorine, magnesium, potassium and sulfur contents. Olivine is the most important phenocryst, although clinopyroxene and spinel are also found. This diverse composition stems from variable melting from a common source rock with subsequent fractionation of olivine and garnet; the source rock appears to be ultimately a product of both mantle and mantle plume components. Hyaloclastite is also found; clay and palagonite found in the field may have formed from volcanic ash through e.g. hydrothermal alteration and manganese oxide crusts cover many flows.

== Eruption history ==
Volcanism on the North Arch volcanic field occurred during the Plio-Pleistocene between 1.5 million years ago (Note: One eruption may have occurred over 1.6 million years ago and some flows are buried beneath sediments generated by the 1.8 – 2.7 million years old Nuanuu landslide on Koolau volcano, Oahu.) and less than 500,000 years ago, at the same time as the Honolulu Volcanics although even younger flows have been found. The timing of volcanic activity has been inferred from the thicknesses of palagonite and sediment layers as well as the stratigraphy and overlaps with rejuvenated volcanism on Oahu, Kauai and Niihau. In contrast, the South Arch volcanic field was emplaced in the last 10,000 years.

Apparently the central part of the field was emplaced first, with the surrounding parts forming later; in addition, lava flows which make up the surrounding parts appear to preferentially originate at the foot of Cretaceous ridges and seamounts; perhaps these ridges and seamounts can act as pathways for magma to reach the surface. Total magma production is about 0.001 cubic kilometres per year (0.00024 mi^{3}/a).

The North Arch volcanic field has been the site of voluminous lava effusion and the formation of shallow magma chambers which gave rise to pit craters when they collapsed. Despite the great depth of the North Arch volcanic field, traces of explosive eruptions has been found there such as steep and low volcanic cones and deposits from fire fountaining; the formation of bubbles from volatile substances in the magma and processes involving supercritical fluids and magma-water interaction are probably involved in the explosive volcanism there.
