= Aldercrest-Banyon landslide =

Landslide in Washington, United States

Coordinates: 46°7′56″N 122°52′48″W

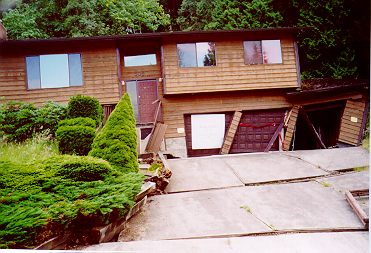
Damaged home in 1998

The Aldercrest-Banyon landslide was a major slow-moving landslide in the east Kelso, Washington neighborhood of Aldercrest beginning in early 1998 through 1999. The disaster ended up being one of the worst urban landslides in United States history in terms of cost. The landslide is one of the most notable in Washington state, which has many landslides due to its mountainous terrain. The Aldercrest-Banyon landslide was the first landslide disaster in the United States that the Federal Emergency Management Agency (FEMA) declared an official disaster area.

== History ==
The 80 acres (32 ha) Aldercrest residential neighborhood was completed in three phases between 1973 and 1979. It is built on an ancient landslide that may have occurred during the Missoula floods (15,300–12,700 years ago). Approximately 2 to 14 million years ago, the Columbia River deposited gravels, sands, silts, and clays and are known as the Troutdale Formation. In the area of the landslide, along a northwest-southeast trending ridge about one-half mile east of Interstate 5, the Troutdale Formation ranges from approximately 40 to 500 feet (12 to 152 m) thick in the Kelso area and was deposited upon a much older, near-shore marine sedimentary deposit known as the Cowlitz Formation. These areas are known for landslide activity. At the base of the slope is the Coweeman River.

== The landslide ==
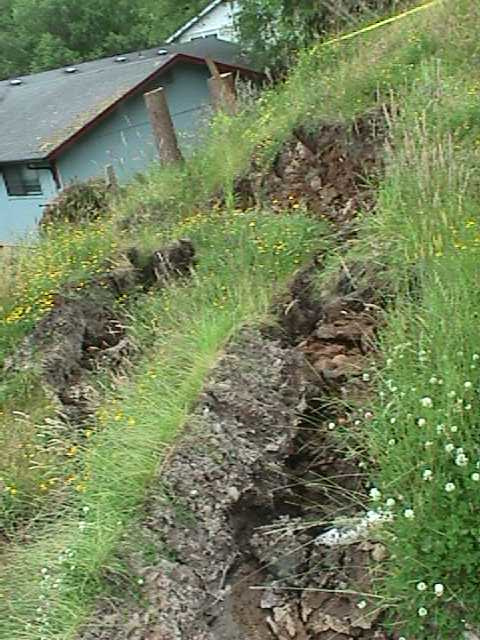
Scarp during the summer of 1998

Following 3.5 years of above average rainfall the water loosened layers of clay but did not percolate through, and the load on the earth was increased. The Troutdale and Cowlitz formations began to slip. Also a road excavation in February 1998 across the lower part of the slide may have been a trigger to cause the initial reactivated movement, which then caused storm drains to break and storm water to be fed back into the slide. Logging operations at the toe of the landslide may also have contributed to the reactivation. Aldercrest-Banyon residents began to see signs of ground movement. In February 1998 underground utilities began to break from the pressure and once broken storm drains fed abundant water into the system, it further increased the earth movement rates. By March homes began to show signs of movement and stress. These included jammed doors and windows, and concrete foundations cracking. Other signs were separation of chimneys from foundations, drywall bulging over nailheads, twisted ceiling beams, water flowing through foundation cracks, bulging walls, kitchen cabinets separating from the walls and creaking, popping and snapping noises could be heard in the homes.

In mid-April 1998, a 2.5 to 6 feet (0.76 to 1.83 m) high crack developed on the natural slope causing the evacuation of two homes. The city of Kelso did its best to repair roads and moved utilities above ground so residents could stay in their homes for as long as possible.

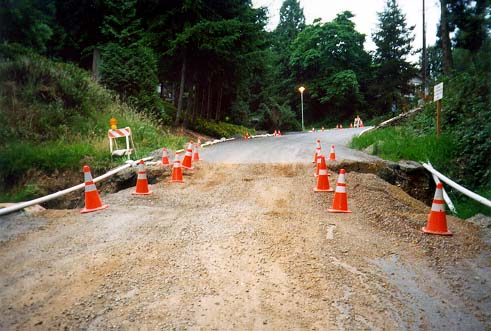
Aldercrest Drive damage

Movement of the upper slope gradually increased into a continuous headscarp approximately 1,500 feet (460 m) long with a vertical separation of 30 feet (9.1 m) by June 1998. The landslide is about 3,000 feet (915 m) wide by 1,500 feet (457 m) in length had reached a height of 125 feet (38 m). In June 1998, 54 homes were located within the active limits of the landslide and during the winter of 1998–99, 3 more homes were swallowed up. The maximum slide movement in 1998 was about 6 to 12 inches (15 to 30 cm) per day

On October 16, 1998, President Bill Clinton and the Federal Emergency Management Agency issued a Presidential Disaster Declaration. Some assistance was then given to the affected residents. The city of Kelso condemned 137 homes and disbursed roughly $4.7 million in FEMA funds to those evacuated.

== Aftermath and damage ==
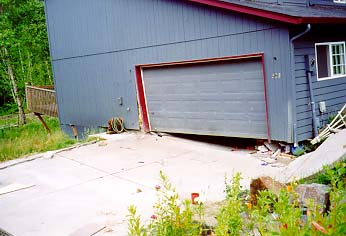
Home damage in 1998

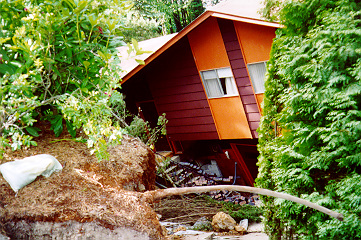
Home damage

The homes and infrastructure suffered more than $70 million (equivalent to $128,796,006 in 2025) of damage. FEMA and the state of Washington offered to buy out 127 homeowners at 30 cents on the dollar. This was the second largest landslide disaster in US history involving homes on a landslide. The largest was the 1956 Portuguese Bend landslide in Palos Verdes Hills of Southern California, when 130 homes were destroyed. All but eleven homeowners took the offer accepting the risk that the upper ridge of possibly reactivating. The federal government has removed all of the purchased homes.

In 2000, in response to the Aldercrest–Banyon and other recent damaging landslides in Cowlitz County, the Washington Division of Geology and Earth Resources began a geographic information systems-based landslide inventory and slope stability mapping project. In total, 260 square miles (680 sq km) of urbanizing lands in Cowlitz County between the Toutle River and the Lewis and Wahkiakum County lines have been mapped for all landslides, regardless of age.

== See also ==
- Washington Department of Natural Resources
- List of Landslides
