= 2014 Banjarnegara landslide =

Landslide in Indonesia

2014 Indonesia Landslide
- Location of Java in Indonesia
- Date: December 12, 2014
- Location: Banjarnegara, Central Java, Indonesia
- Cause: Landslide due to heavy rain.
- Deaths: 93
- Missing: 23 (presumed dead)

In the evening of 12 December 2014, a landslide in Banjarnegara, Central Java, Indonesia, killing 93 with 23 people missing. The disaster occurred on Jemblung Village in Banjarnegara, Indonesia, at Friday, around 03.00 p.m. At the time, most of the villagers were taking a nap on their houses. The landslides also trapped some vehicles on the road. Amateur video caught the moment when a large piece of the mountain fell to the whole village. Indonesian authority said that at least around 100 people are feared dead and 300 houses were destroyed.

Jemblung village took a direct hit from the landslides. Jemblung Village is a place where 300 residents live. Around 200 people survived the disaster, another a hundred people didn't, which represents a third population of the village who didn't come out alive.

The 2014 Banjarnegara landslide was one of the worst and deadliest landslide in Indonesia since 2006. Indonesian official concluded that heavy rain were blamed for the mass human life loss, although human error were also a prime suspect. As the result of the tragedy, the Indonesian government began inspecting all regencies and district on high-risk area, particularly Banjarnegara itself.

== Search and Rescue operation ==
Shortly after the disaster, the Indonesia's National Search and Rescue Agency (Indonesian: Basarnas) deployed around 200 in the search and rescue team and began the search for survivors, with having most of them finding some in the area. One survivor, a woman, found by a rescuer alive with her family in their car. Due to the remote and hilly area, rescuers weren't able to reach the ground zero. This condition was later worsened with heavy rains in the area, increasing the risk of flash floods and even could drown the remaining survivors. Ironically, some of them were found due to heavy rain in the area.

Few days after the search, several bodies of the villagers and residents of Jemblung Village were found. Numerous bodies were also found on a car that was swept away by the landslides with their bodies still strapped on their seats.

The search and rescue operation officially ended on 21 December, with 23 people still missing.

== Cause ==
Data from Indonesian Agency for Meteorology, Climatology and Geophysics (Indonesian: Badan Meteorologi Klimatologi Geofisika) shows that 11 days before the disaster the area was hit by heavy rain, around 50% from its annual rainfall. The Indonesian Institute of Sciences later explained that the ground on the area were soaked by the rain, caused the ground to move. The area was also a steep area causing the place itself "a perfect place for a disaster to be occurred".

== Aftermath ==
Shortly after the disaster, Indonesia's President Joko Widodo visited the area with his wife, Iriana Widodo. He also ordered Indonesia's National Soldier to evacuate the remaining citizens in these particular area: Sletri Village, Sampang Village, and Pawesen Village. Hundreds of people were displaced. Most of them were traumatized by the disaster. Volunteers began conducting some research and safe steps to the remaining residents on the "high-risk area". They were also putting some "landslides early warning systems" to prevent similar tragedy to be occurred.

== See also ==
- 2014 Oso mudslide
- List of landslides
