= Hawaiian Trough =

Moat-like depression of the seafloor surrounding the Hawaiian Islands

The Hawaiian Trough, otherwise known as the Hawaiian Deep, is a moat-like depression of the seafloor surrounding the Hawaiian Islands. The weight from the volcanic island chain depresses the plastic lithosphere that is already weakened by the underlying thermal hotspot, causing subsidence to occur. The location with the greatest rate of subsidence is directly above the hotspot and beneath the youngest and largest island (Hawai'i) with a rate of about 0.1 inches (2.5 millimeters) per year. The flexure in the lithosphere caused by subsidence beneath the island chain, and in particular Hawai'i, creates uplift along the ocean floor surrounding the trough. The elevated ocean floor is known as the Hawaiian Arch. The Hawaiian Arch extends about 656 feet (200 meters) above the surrounding ocean floor, and contains tilted coral reefs. The Hawaiian Trough is about 18,045 feet (5,500 meters) deep and has a radius of about 8.7 miles (14.0 km).

== Trough Development ==
The Hawaiian Trough is filled with a stratified sedimentary section >2 km thick that was deposited in 4 sequential stages. The first (bottom) stage is a basal layer composed of 50 –100 m of primarily pelagic sediment. This layer was slowly deposited on the 80-Ma oceanic crust before the depression formed. The sediment in this layer is from a variety of different sources including wind blown material, slowly settling fine-grained sediment, and biogenic debris. The second stage is characterized by a bedded layer of volcanoclastic material that fills the Trough as it quickly subsides due to large influxes of material from nearby volcanoes. The majority of material in this layer was transported by turbidity currents that flow along the axis of the moat and transport material from mass wasting events. During the third stage, the depression fills with slumps and debris avalanches which creates a layer of landslide debris. This layer contributes to the bulk of the sediment in the Trough. In the fourth and final stage, volcanic activity and subsidence effectively ends, and sediment deposits brought by turbidity currents, create a ponded unit in the deepest part of the Trough. This top layer is primarily composed of turbidite and pelagic sediments.

The largest mass wasting events, such as the Nuuanu-Wailau debris avalanches and the Hana slump, overfilled the moat and created a series of sub-basins. These large deposits block the lateral transport of sediment along the Trough, especially in the deepest sections. Storm surges and internal waves trigger mass wasting events from older volcanos on the western side of the ridge, earthquakes provoke this behavior from younger volcanos on the eastern side^{[1]}.

== Coral Reefs ==
The coral reefs in the Hawaiian Trough are described as mesophotic coral ecosystems, which can be found between 100 and 500 feet below sea level. 43 percent of fish species documented at the mesophotic reefs are unique to the Hawaiian Islands. At Maui's ‘Au’au channel the largest uninterrupted mesophotic coral ecosystem was discovered, with an area larger than 3 square miles. These reefs contained many stony, reef building coral that belong to the genus Leptoseris, which are adapted for deep water environments. These coral environments are not greatly understood because the great depth where they exist make exploration difficult.

== See also ==
- South Arch volcanic field
- Submarine landslide
