= Hope Slide =

1965 landslide in Hope, British Columbia

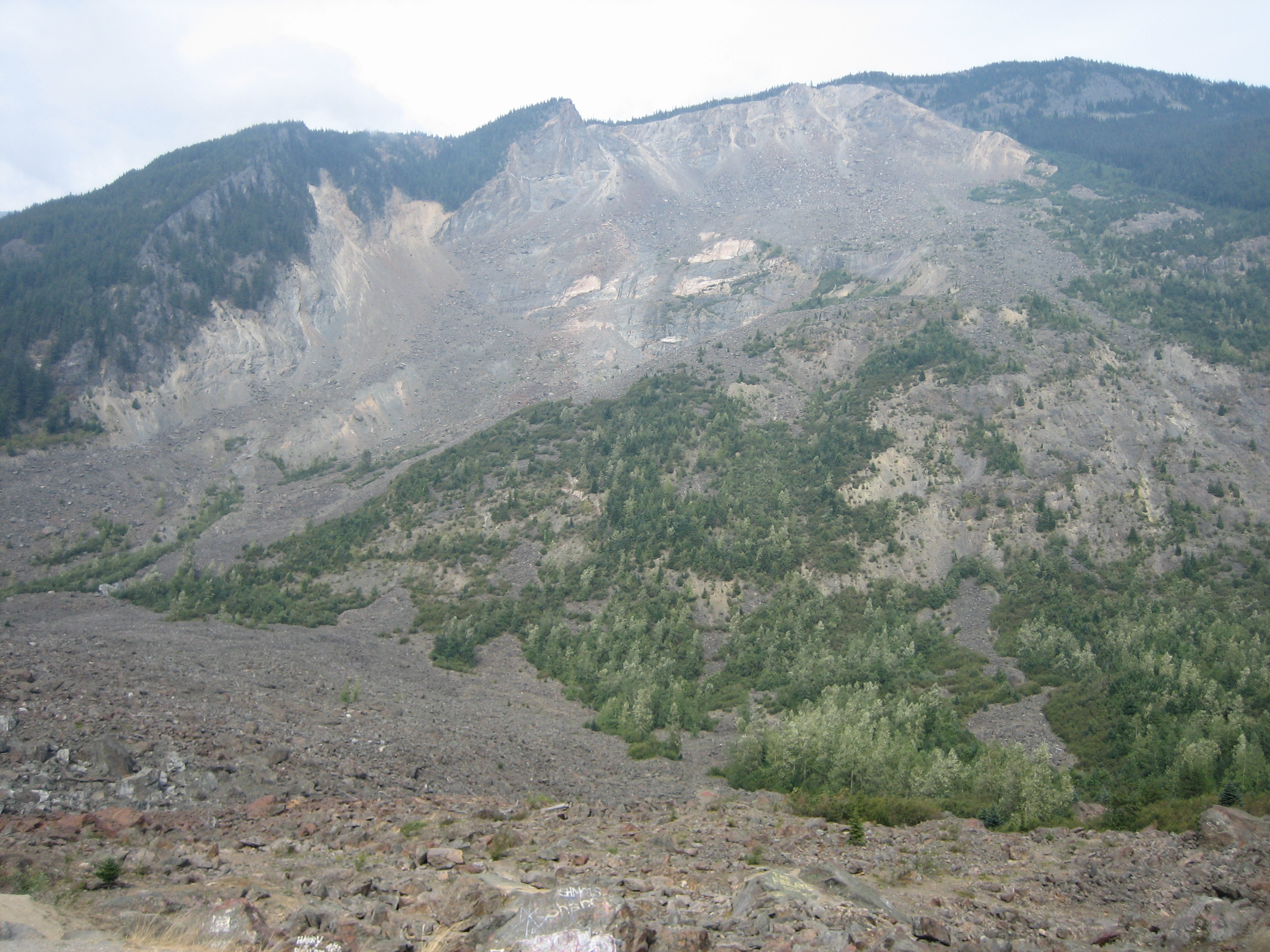
The Hope Slide

The Hope Slide was a landslide that occurred in the morning hours of January 9, 1965 in the Nicolum Valley (49°17′56″N 121°15′49″W) in the Cascade Mountains near Hope, British Columbia and killed four people. The volume of rock involved in the landslide has been estimated at 47 million cubic metres. It is one of the two largest recorded landslides in Canada (along with the similarly sized 2010 Mount Meager landslide).

== Prior avalanche ==
A few hours prior to the landslide, a small avalanche had forced five people to stop a few miles southeast of the town of Hope, British Columbia—150 kilometres (93 mi) east of Vancouver—on a stretch of the Hope-Princeton Highway below Johnson Peak.

== Landslide ==
Two earthquakes were recorded in the general area of the slide. One quake occurred at 3:56 am and the second at 6:58 am. The slide that obliterated the mountain's southwestern slope was discovered when members of the RCMP detachment at Hope were dispatched to what were reported as a couple of small rock slides. The first news reports of the slide were from CHWK Radio in Chilliwack where morning news reporter Gerald Pash and later news director Edgar Wilson filed voice reports with Broadcast News and The Canadian Press.

The slide completely displaced the ice and mud in Outram Lake below with incredible force, throwing it against the opposite side of the valley, wiping all vegetation and trees down to the bare rock, then splashed back up the original, now bare, slope before settling. Recent research shows that these impacts against the opposite valley sides produced the seismic signatures interpreted as earthquakes.

The slide buried a 1959 yellow Chevrolet convertible that had become stuck in the first slide, an Arrow Transfer oil tanker truck, and a loaded hay truck that had stopped behind the tanker under a torrent of 47 million cubic metres of pulverized rock, mud, and debris 150 metres (500 ft) deep and 2 kilometres (1.2 mi) wide, which came down the 1,200-metre (4,000 ft) mountainside.

Norman Stephanishin, the Arrow truck driver, had stopped behind the stuck convertible. Stephanishin, unable to turn his rig around on the narrow and icy road, tried to talk the four others into walking the five kilometres back to Sumallo Lodge. Unable to convince them, Stephanishin walked east to Sumallo Lodge to phone the British Columbia Department of Highways. In a short distance, Stephanishin flagged down a Greyhound Canada bus travelling to Vancouver and persuaded the driver, David Hughes, to return with him to Sumallo Lodge. Hughes turned back and is credited with saving his passengers from a tragedy.

Rescue workers from Hope and Princeton found the body of Thomas Starchuck, 39, of Aldergrove, driver of the hay truck. The body of Bernie Lloyd Beck, 27, of Penticton, driver of the convertible was also retrieved. Beck's passengers, Dennis George Arlitt, 23, of Penticton, and Mary Kalmakoff, 21, of Shoreacres, were never recovered.

Phil Gaglardi, the British Columbia Minister of Highways, attended the scene and directed the construction of a temporary tote road over the southern portion of the slide. In twenty-one days a bumpy route had been established over the slide.

== Cause ==
The landslide was caused by the presence of pre-existing tectonic structures (faults and shear zones) within the southwestern slope of Johnson Ridge. The lower parts of the slide scar are underlain by felsite sheets (which may have failed first) while the upper parts of the slide scar are underlain by highly jointed Paleozoic greenstone beds. Ongoing weathering and tectonic activity weakened the slide mass to the point where it had reached limiting equilibrium. Johnson Peak was the site of a previous smaller prehistoric rock-slide.

Just what triggered the 1965 landslide remains unclear; the two so-called earthquakes were likely too small to trigger the slide and thus the seismic events were more likely caused by the impact of the landslide masses on the opposite valley wall. Changes in groundwater condition, often a trigger for landslides, is not thought to have played a role in the Hope Slide as the slide occurred during a protracted period of sub-zero temperatures in the winter, though some have suggested that freezing of seepage exit points may have caused an increase in water pressure at the toe of the slide.

== Result ==
In places, the slide buried parts of the area below in up to 152 m (500 ft) of rocks, mud, and debris. About 3.5 kilometres of the highway were destroyed and it took 13 days for Department of Highways' workers to re-establish the route. The highway has since been rerouted further away from the slide location, around and over the base of the slide's debris field 55 metres above the original ground level on the other side of valley. Though much of the massive scar on the mountain face remains bare rock, vegetation including trees are growing over parts of the slide area.

Beginning in 1967, the Meteorological Branch of the Department of Transport established a weather station, named Hope Slide, near the rockslide deposit. The monitoring site has since been moved twice and the latest one, Hope Slide A, continues to record hourly data as of October 2025.

A rest area for Highway 3 now exists at the slide area, which includes a memorial and a view point that allows tourists to view the scar.

== See also ==
- List of landslides
- 2010 Mount Meager landslide
- Frank Slide
