= 2014 Hiroshima landslides =

Natural disaster in Japan

- Location of Hiroshima Prefecture in Japan
- Date: 20 August 2014
- Location: Hiroshima Prefecture, Japan; 34.487°N 132.494°E
- Also known as: 広島土砂災害(Hiroshima Dosha Saigai), 平成26年8月19日からの豪雨災害(Heisei 26-nen 8 tsuki 19-nichi Kara no Gōu Saigai)
- Cause: Landslide due to heavy rain
- Deaths: 74
- Injuries: 69
- Missing: 0

On 20 August 2014, Hiroshima Prefecture in Japan was struck by a series of landslides following heavy rain. The rain triggered 166 slope failures which included 107 debris flows and 59 shallow slides. The landslides hit residential areas including Kabe, Asakita Ward, Yagi, Yamamoto, Midorii, and Asaminami Ward. Of these areas, the Asakita and Asaminami Wards in Northern Hiroshima were hit the hardest.

Following the rainfall, Hiroshima issued an evacuation advisory at 4:15 am. Mayor Kazumi Matsui confessed regret over the advisory's late issuance and recommended that the city study the incident to improve the process. Under the law which took effect in 2001, prefectural governments and other authorities must carry out on-site research to designate areas for which evacuation plans and hazard maps will be created. In Hiroshima there are about 32,000 possibly dangerous areas, the highest of all 47 prefectures. There were 44 injuries and 74 deaths. According to the police, the deaths included three boys aged two, three and eleven.

== Landslide characteristics ==
The debris flows covered a 10 km by 2 km region that ran from NE to SW. The most impacted area was Yagi 3-Chome, located near the Midorigaoka prefecture. Within this area, landslides and debris flows occurred behind the Abu-no-Sato housing complex, Mitsuhiro Shine, and Midorigaoka prefectural apartments. The characteristics of some of these flows are described below.

=== Midorigaoka debris flow ===
The Midorigaoka debris flow, located in the Asaminami Ward, entered the residential area and spread out across a large area while continuing for a considerable distance. It consisted of mainly coarse granite. This material was transported out of the terminal area of the channel, and deposited into the residential area. Within these deposits, fine granite soil particles were found. After 10 days from the event, large amounts of water was found near the source of this flow, resulting in muddy conditions. Overall, around 33,000m^{3} of soil mass was generated by the debris flow.

=== Abu-no-Sato debris flow ===
The Abu-no-Sato debris flow, located in the Asaminami Ward, consisted of two separate channels. They came to a stop before the residential area, and was about 5m wide and 30m long. It consisted of metamorphic and sedimentary rocks (e.g., hard hornfels rock), with very little granite. The flows went through a narrow gully, then dropped down almost vertically for approximately 5m. Through its travel, the flow picked up various debris which resulted in the deposits consisting of fractured hornfels and colluvium.

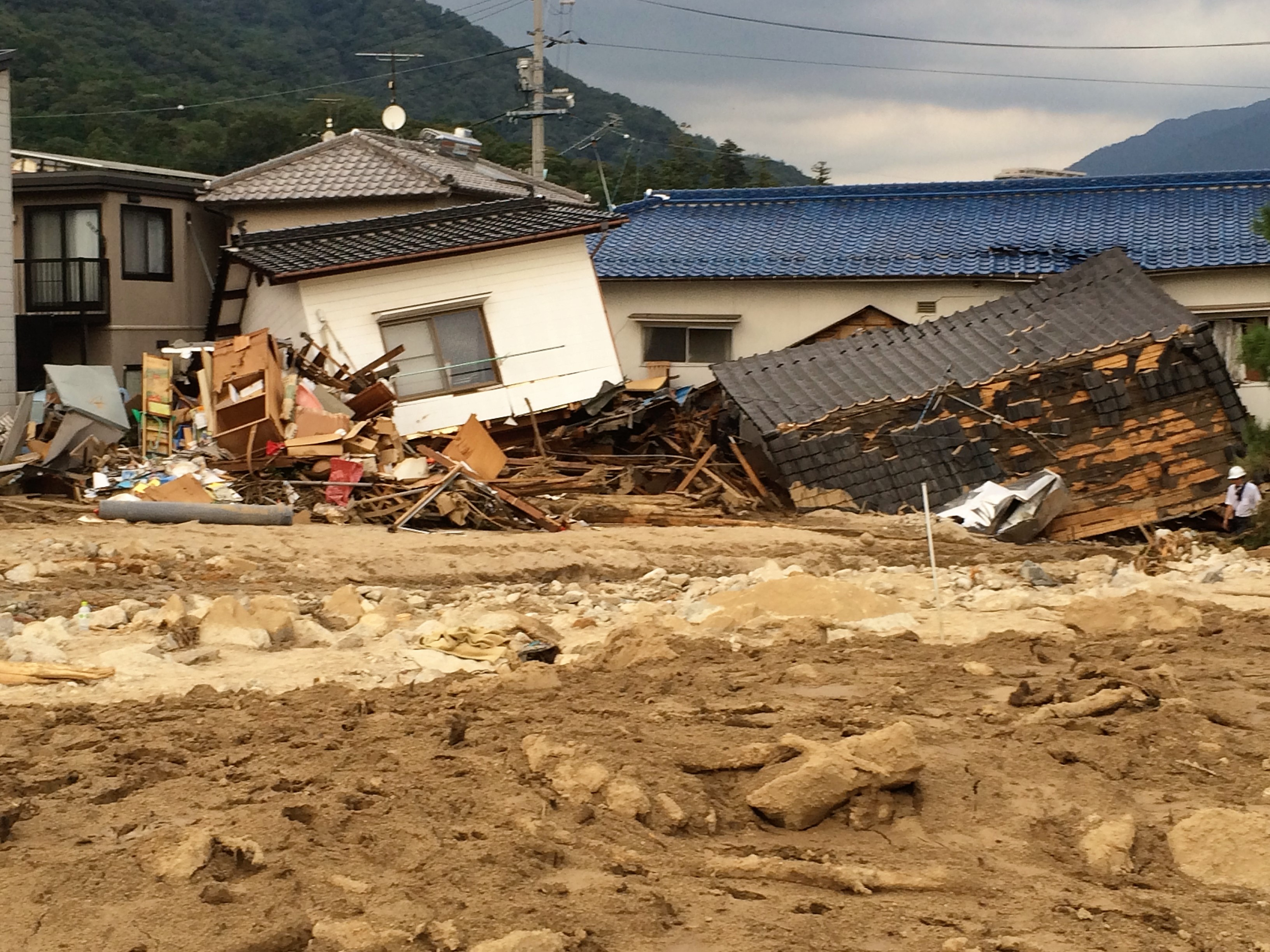
A house shed by debris flow

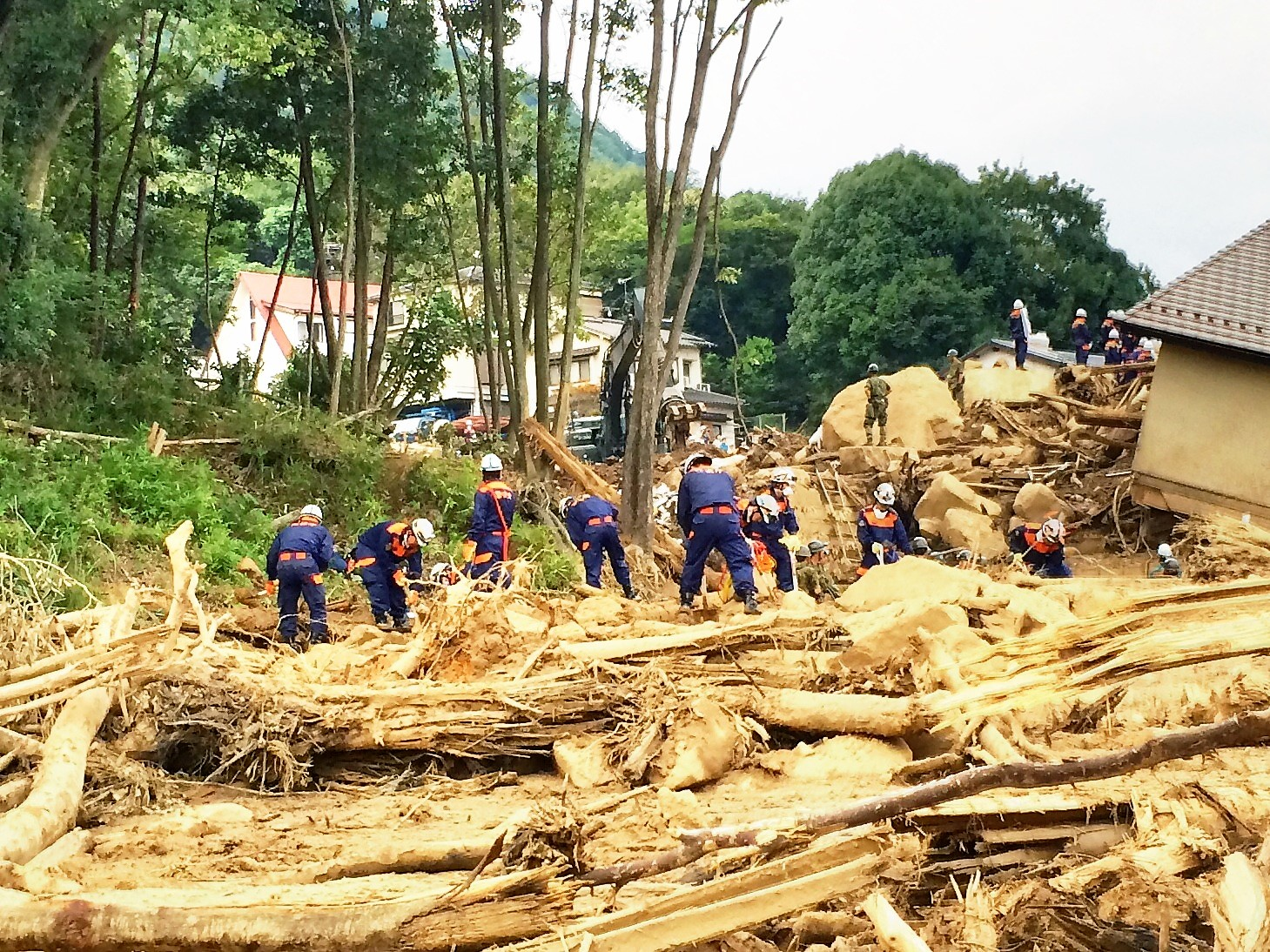
Rescue operation

== Causes ==
=== Rainfall ===
The main triggering cause for the event was the highly intense, short duration rain that occurred in the area. Due to the warm, moist air from the Akisame front which passed over the western Shugoku Mountains, cumulonimbus clouds began to develop in the northwest of Hiroshima City. These rainy conditions were unusual, highly extreme, and difficult to predict. Following the torrential rain, in which over 200mm of cumulative rainfall fell, several landslides were triggered near a mountain beside the city of Hiroshima. Asakita-ku was the hardest-hit ward. It received 217.5 millimetres (8.56 in) of rain from 1:30 am to 4:30 am causing two landslides which occurred between 4 am and 6 am. This significant volume of rain hit the surface, resulting in constrained groundwater in the water-bearing layer and a development of a head. The layer then collapsed as a result of the confined water pressure's uplift force.

=== Geological conditions ===
As there were faults, fracture zones, and joints in the area, there were several locations with significant permeability. Due to the heavy upstream rainfall, the groundwater in these places turned into artesian water. As a result, the slopes experienced destabilization.

The Midorigaoka debris flow was composed of coarse granite, which easily develops sheeting joints and micro-sheeting joints. These joints in weathered granite make the area more easy to erode away. As a result, the volume of the flow increased in size and energy as it flowed down the gully. The deposits were also rich in fine granite soil particles which can decrease the permeability of the flow and cause greater mobility. Due to these characteristics, the flow traveled far and had a great spread. Yagi 3-Chome, which had the most damage reported, lies between an area composed of granite.

The Abu-no-Sato debris flow was composed of hard hornfels rock, which is large in size. Thus, the permeability was quite high, resulting in less transportation. The flow deposits, then, did not reach the residential area, but were found at the bottom of the wide and gently sloped gully. However, deaths still occurred in the area due to a collapse of an old debris flow deposit terrace that mobilized boulders and trees into the complex area.

== Casualties ==
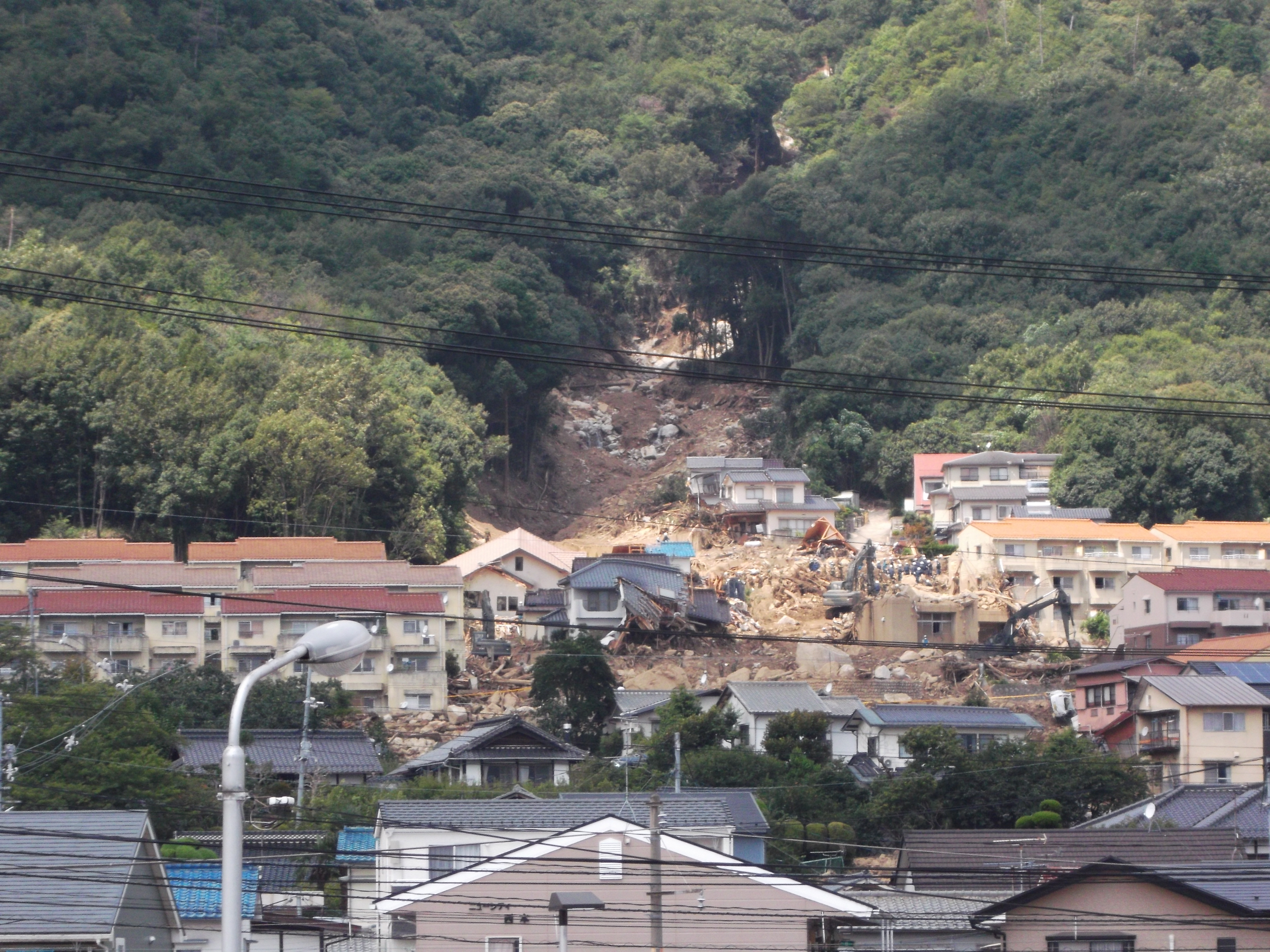
Landslide damage

As of 21 November 2014, at least 74 people have died as a result of the landslides. One of the dead was a rescue worker killed after the hillside collapsed a second time. Two children, aged 2 and 11, died in a mudslide in Asaminami-ku around 3:20am. The number of casualties was initially feared to be 100. The number missing was reported to be 52 on the morning of 22 August, but in the afternoon it was revised to 47, then to 46 on the morning of the 23rd, and later on the morning of the same day to 43. On 9 September, police announced that they had found one body, which has since been identified. Another body was found on 18 September, which has since then been also identified.

On 23 August, Hiroshima city was considering publishing a list of missing persons to speed up safety confirmation. A missing persons list with 28 names in it was published on 25 August. As of 19 September, all bodies of 28 of those listed have been found and identified.

Burials for two of the youngest victims – eleven years old and two years old – and the firefighter, were conducted on 22 August.

Buddhist memorial service was held on 23 September and Shijukunichi (Note: Lit. "Forty-nine Days." Memorial service to be held forty-ninth day after a person's death.) service for ten victims on 28 September, for several others on 4 October and officially on 7 October.

== Rescue efforts ==
Former Japanese Prime Minister Shinzo Abe directed the military to deploy hundreds of personnel to assist the local rescue teams. Japanese Red Cross and the NPO Peace Winds Japan also sent staff, and an estimated 1,300 people have volunteered. Disaster Volunteer of Hiroshima City decided to discontinue activities on 24 August. Volunteers continued later, but stopped temporarily on 4 September because of bad weather.

An estimated 2,000–3,600 rescuers consisting of firefighters, police and members of the Self-Defense Force (SDF) took part in searching and clearing debris despite rain and dangerous conditions that hampered and sometimes halted their efforts. There was also ongoing risk for a secondary disaster, and more rain was forecast for the area. (Note: *The rain advisory issued on 24 August by the Japan Meteorological Agency was removed temporarily when advisories were updated at 11:16 JST, 26 August 2014 *Issued again at 14:35 JST, 27 August 2014 until 19:11 JST, 27 August 2014 *Issued again at 16:49 JST, 3 September 2014 and removed at 16:08 JST, 4 September 2014. *Issued again at 11:14 JST, 6 September 2014 until 18:52 JST, 6 September 2014 *Issued at 13:48 JST, 8 September 2014(At 14:40 JST, 12 September 2014, advisory was changed to "Dry Air"-advisory for most of the prefecture.), removed at 21:10 JST, 14 September 2014. *Advisory issued 15:55 JST, 24 September 2014 because typhoon, removed 13:35 JST, 25 September 2014.*Advisory issued 04:08 JST, 2 October 2014 (changed from "Dry Air"-advisory 16:23 JST, 5 October 2014, because typhoon.), removed 18:10 JST, 6 October 2014.*Issued 23:37 JST, 8 October 2014, removed 12:53 JST, 10 October 2014.*Issued 10:11 JST, 12 October 2014, later updated from advisory to warning. Downgraded back to advisory 21:24 JST, 13 October 2014(changed to "Dry Air"-advisory at 10:03 JST, 14 October 2014), removed 21:23 JST, 19 October 2014.*Issued 16:06 JST, 21 October 2014, removed 16:15 JST, 22 October 2014.*Issued 01:49 JST, 27 October 2014, removed 13:41 JST, 27 October 2014.*Issued 04:22 JST, 9 November 2014(changed to "Dense Fog-advisory" 21:20 JST, 9 November 2014), removed 20:13 JST, 11 November 2014*Issued 16:12 JST, 12 November 2014(changed to "Dry Air"-advisory at 16:11 JST, 13 November 2014), removed 20:05 JST, 16 November 2014.) Consequently, residents on Asakita and Asaminami were told to evacuate. Because schools were being used as shelters, several had to postpone the start dates. All elementary school shelters were closed 1 November.

Evacuation advisories were partially lifted for Asaminami-ku on Sunday, 31 August, allowing about 14,400 persons (around 5700 households) to return to their homes.

Number of persons and households in shelters, by date:

Date	Persons(approx.)	Households (approx.)
Sunday 31 August	1,010	470
1 September	950	450
2 September	880	410
3 September	810	390
4 September	970	460
5 September	800	390
6 September	690	350
7 September	660	340
8 September	660	330
9 September	630	320
10 September (Note: Counting method was changed. Numbers are headcount of evacuees from "last night at clock 22:00" instead persons recorded.(in this case, 9.9, at 22:00))	110	70
11 September	100	60
12 September	100	60
13 September	80	50
14 September	100	50
15 September	100	50
16 September	70	50
17 September	80	40
18 September	80	50
19 September	80	40
20 September (Note: Source was changed. Hiroshima Prefecture no longer publishes notices.)	80	40
21 September	80	40
22 September	70	40
23 September	80	40
24 September	90	50
25 September	270	140
26 September	80	40
27 September	70	30
28 September	50	30
29 September	50	30
30 September	50	30
1 October	50	30
2 October	50	30
3 October	60	30
4 October	50	30
5 October	50	20
6 October	80	40
7 October	40	30
8 October	30	20
9 October	40	20
10 October	40	20
11 October	40	20
12 October	30	20
13 October	50	30
14 October	70	40
15 October	40	20
16 October	30	20
17 October	40	20
18 October	40	20
19 October	30	20
20 October	30	20
21 October	30	20
22 October	30	20
23 October	30	20
24 October	30	10
25 October	20	10
26 October	20	10
27 October	20	10
28 October	20	10
29 October	20	10
30 October	20	10
31 October	20	10
1 November	20	10
2 November	10	10
3 November	10	10
4 November	10	10
5 November	10	10
6 November	10	10
7 November	10	10
8 November	10	10
9 November	10	10
10 November	10	10
11 November	10	10
12 November	10	10
13 November	10	10
14 November	10	10
15 November	10	10
16 November	10	10
17 November	10	10
18 November	10	10
19 November	10	10
20 November	10	4
21 November	10	3
22 November	10	3
23 November	10	3
24 November	10	3
25 November	10	3
26 November	10	3
27 November	10	3
28 November	10	3
29 November	10	2
30 November	10	2
1 December	10	2
2 December	10	2
3 December	10	2
4 December	3	1
5 December	3	1
6 December	3	1
7 December	3	1
8 December	3	1
9 December	3	1
10 December	3	1
11 December	3	1
12 December	3	1
13 December	3	1
14 December	3	1
15 December	3	1
16 December	3	1
17 December	2	1
18 December	2	1
19 December	2	1
20 December	2	1
21 December	2	1
22 December	2	1
23 December	2	1
24 December	2	1
25 December	2	1

Former Prime Minister Shinzo Abe planned to visit the disaster area on the morning of 24 August, but bad weather postponed his visit by one day.

The Emperor and Empress visited Hiroshima 3 December, and observed damage and met survivors, SDF personnel, firefighters, police and volunteers.

5 September Cabinet of Japan meeting estimated that 900 million yen is needed for Hiroshima's recovery. (The valuation of the damage caused by the landslide is incomplete.)

Hiroshima prefectural and municipal governments decided to provide 157 public housing units, for evacuees, free of charge. Officials were forced to hold a lottery after 284 households applied. Local governments are also preparing to build temporary housing for those who lost their homes. The procedures will begin on 28 August, which is also the earliest day tenants can move in. According to the city, municipal housing is provided rent-free for up to a maximum six-month stay, as a general rule.

On 2 September, officials issued a new evacuation advisory to parts of Asaminami-ku, fearing that a nearby slope might collapse and cause more damage. This affected around 2,520 persons(about 980 households).

Voluntarily evacuation order was issued 24 September to districts of Asakita and Asaminami-ku because Typhoon 16. At next day, part of it was cancelled.

On 1 October and further 7 October and 17th, evacuation advisories were cancelled for several parts of area.

On 20 November, last evacuation advisory was cancelled and 42 people (16 households) were able to return to their homes.

The last shelter was closed 25 December.

== See also ==
- 2018 Japan floods
- 2020 Kyushu floods
- List of landslides
