= Alta landslide =

2020 landslide in Norway

Geography of Alta Landslide
- Coordinates: 70°01′50″N 23°04′14″E
- Terrain: Coastal
- Natural hazards: Landslide

The Alta landslide occurred on 3 June 2020 in Alta Municipality in Finnmark county, Norway near Kråkneset, a small village about 6 kilometres (3.7 mi) southeast of the larger village of Talvik, Altafjorden. The landslide developed on a quick clay substrate that had originally formed in the early Holocene epoch when the area was under sea level. Eight buildings were swept out to sea, as a result.

== See also ==
- List of landslides
