= 2014 West Salt Creek landslide =

Landslide in Colorado, United States

Coordinates: 39°10′07″N 107°50′54″W

Aerial view of the landslide, looking south towards Grand Mesa

Location of the West Salt Creek landslide in Colorado

The West Salt Creek landslide (also known as the Grand Mesa landslide or West Salt Creek rock avalanche) occurred on the evening of May 25, 2014 near Collbran, Colorado, along the north side of the Grand Mesa, about 30 miles (48 km) east of Grand Junction. It was the largest landslide in Colorado's history.

== Background ==
West Salt Creek is located on the north slope of the Grand Mesa, descending steeply from about 10,000 feet (3,000 m) elevation at the top of the mountain to about 7,400 feet (2,300 m) in the Plateau Valley. Via Plateau Creek, it is a tributary of the Colorado River. The valley of West Salt Creek was used mainly for cattle ranching and was mostly private property owned by the Hawkins family. However, the area where the slide originated was located on public land in the Grand Mesa National Forest.

The landslide was caused by a mass wasting event in the Green River Formation, which is composed mainly of loose sedimentary rock, namely shale. The U.S. Geological Survey (USGS) determined that the event occurred on the site of an ancient landslide dating back to the late Pleistocene or early Holocene, at least 11,700 years ago. Such geological features are not uncommon to this area of the Grand Mesa, which exhibits a "landslide bench" where creep rates of 1.5 to 6 inches (38 to 152 mm) per year have been previously documented.

== Initial landslide ==
Unseasonably heavy rains during May 23–24 melted the local snowpack and saturated the ground to the point of instability. A small landslide was recorded at approximately 7:18 AM on May 25, and minor slope movement was noticed throughout the day. At 5:44 PM on May 25 a large chunk of the West Salt Creek valley headwall (known as the "slump block") collapsed catastrophically. The initial collapse triggered a wave of subsequent rock failures (a "rock avalanche") that moved 2.8 miles (4.5 km) down the valley of West Salt Creek, burying almost 600 acres (240 ha) of land under 38 million yd^{3} (29 million m^{3}) of debris. The average speed of the landslide was about 45 miles (72 km) per hour, with a maximum of 75 to 140 miles (121 to 225 km) per hour, and its maximum depth reached 123 feet (37 m). The slide descended a total of 2,300 feet (700 m) from the rim of the Grand Mesa to the valley below. The speed of the slide was likely increased by a layer of liquefied material underneath the main rock avalanche. Residents described the sound of the landslide as “a low flying, large military helicopter”, "a very long clap of thunder", or “a freight train coming”.

The landslide generated a M_{w} 2.8 earthquake, destroyed irrigation works and threatened active gas wells in the area, but did not reach Collbran, about 6 miles (9.7 km) further downstream from the toe of the slide. Although the initial slide lasted only about three minutes, a second debris flow occurred on top of the initial slide, followed by a further collapse of the downslope face of the slide. Smaller landslides and slope failures continued for several weeks after the disaster, bringing the total volume of collapsed material to 71.2 million yd^{3} (54.5 million m^{3}). This makes it much larger than the Oso landslide which occurred two months previously in northern Washington. Vibrations from the slide were recorded by seismographs up to 400 miles (640 km) away.

Dispatchers in Grand Junction received the first reports of the landslide around 6:15 PM, and the Plateau Valley Fire Department was called into the area. Three people – Wes Hawkins, Clancy Nichols and Danny Nichols – were reported missing after heading into the area to investigate an irrigation ditch, whose flow had been disrupted by the first landslide at 7:18 AM. Local authorities were joined by experts from the USGS and National Weather Service in the search for the missing men; over 40 people were involved in the search. The search was called off the next day due to dangerous and unstable conditions in the area. The bodies were never found and the three men are presumed killed.

== Aftermath ==
Immediately after the landslide, geologists installed monitoring equipment and conducted an emergency hazard assessment for the area. Because the slide occurred mostly on private property, access for investigation and media coverage was limited; the U.S. Forest Service established a 300-yard (270 m) restriction area around the upper part of the slide where it originated in the Grand Mesa National Forest. There was speculation that fracking in the area could have led to the slide due to impact on seismic activity. However, the closest gas well was located 2,000 feet (610 m) lower than where the slide originated, and was drilled into a separate geological formation (the Wasatch Formation), and experts concluded that the slide occurred due to natural causes.

Rotation of the slump block dammed the upper part of West Salt Creek, backing up about 120 million gallons (444,000 m^{3}) of water in a temporary lake, threatening downstream communities and landowners. Authorities discussed whether to artificially breach or lower the pond level, but due to the remoteness of the area and its instability, no such work was performed. On May 27, 2016, slightly more than two years after the slide, the pond partially breached, sending a surge of water down West Salt Creek into Plateau Creek; however, the flooding only caused minor damage. The water carved a canyon 200 feet (61 m) deep in the upper part of the landslide and established a new channel for West Salt Creek.

Although the pond has partially drained, the large tilted slump block with a volume of about 65 million yd^{3} (50 million m^{3}) remains poised at the top of the escarpment, leaning at about 15 degrees; this combined with pressure from groundwater flow poses "a long-term threat for additional slope instability". In addition, the USGS continues to monitor impounded water levels at the dammed pond.

== See also ==
- List of landslides
