= Tuscaloosa Seamount =

Seamount in the Pacific Ocean

Highest point
- Elevation: -2765
- Coordinates: 22°4′0″N 157°5′0″W

Geography
- Location: Pacific
- Region: US-HI (Hawaii)

Geology
- Rock age: 1.5 to 2 ma
- Mountain type: hyaloclastite

The Tuscaloosa Seamount is an undersea mountain in the Hawaiian archipelago. It is about 100 kilometres (62 mi) northeast of the island Oʻahu.

Tuscaloosa Seamount is composed of volcanic rock, but in contrast to the overwhelming majority of seamounts, it is not a submarine volcano. It is a huge block of rocks that broke off about two million years ago at the Nuʻuanu submarine landslide when the volcano Koʻolau collapsed.

The Tuscaloosa Seamount is 30 km (19 mi) long and 17 km (11 mi) wide. Its shallow summit rises 1.8 kilometres (1.1 mi) across the sea bottom but is 2,756 metres (9,042 ft) below sea level.
