= 2024 Davao de Oro landslide =

2024 landslide in the Philippines

- Date: February 6, 2024
- Location: Maco, Davao de Oro, Philippines; 7°23′32.2″N 126°01′45.2″E
- Type: landslide
- Deaths: 98
- Injuries: 32
- Missing: 8

On February 6, 2024, a landslide occurred in Maco, Davao de Oro, Philippines, after heavy rainfall, killing at least 98 people.

== Landslide ==
The landslide occurred at around 7:50 pm on February 6. An estimated 9.8 hectares (24 acres) of land was buried by rocks, mud and trees that slid over 700 meters (2,300 ft) down a steep mountainside near the Apex Mining Co concession in Zone 1 of Barangay Masara. At least 42 of the dead were residents including 26 mine employees. Among those initially reported missing were 45 gold miners employed by Apex who were waiting in three buses to be driven home at the end of one of three shifts for the mine's 24-hour operation when the landslide started and were buried. At least 32 injured people were rescued from the debris, some of whom were bus passengers who had managed to jump out before the landslide hit. An official said that the height of the landslide was enough to "almost cover a two-story building."

The landslide buried the transport terminal were the buses were located, as well as a jeepney, 62 houses and the barangay hall of Masara. Most of the residents in the affected community worked either as miners or took jobs servicing the miners. The landslide also blocked a tributary of the Hijo river that traverses the village, raising fears of a flash flood.

== Response ==
=== Rescue operations ===
At least 474 people were involved in the rescue operation, mostly from units of the Philippine Army, the Bureau of Fire Protection, the Philippine Coast Guard, local government agencies and Apex Mining. Sniffer dogs were also deployed to look for victims. The operation was hampered by thick mud, heavy rain, thick mud and the danger of more landslides, as well as the absence of telecommunications signals and impassable roads. Rescue and retrieval operations were interrupted by two earthquakes measuring magnitudes of 5.9 and 5.2 on the Richter scale that struck the area on February 10, as well as another landslide on February 13. Over 1,250 families, equivalent to 5,227 people, in Masara and four other barangays of Maco, were evacuated.

A three-year old child and a two-month old infant were rescued on February 9 after being buried for more than 60 hours by the debris, prompting a 14-hour extension of rescue operations beyond the 48-hour limit. Eleven of the injured were taken to a hospital in Tagum, while three people were evacuated by helicopter. Rescue operations formally transitioned to the retrieval of bodies on February 14.

=== Retrieval operations ===
The Incident Management Team (IMT) did not find any additional human remains in ground zero after February 18. As early as then, several groups of responders ended their efforts to participate in the operations.

On February 22, search and retrieval operations at the site were terminated following an executive order by municipal mayor Arthur Carlos Voltaire Rimando, as recommended by the IMT which reported the "completion of [clearing operations] at ground zero".

Ninety-eight fatalities were recovered from the landslide, (excluding several body parts) while eight individuals remain missing, which are said among those still unidentified.

== Aftermath ==
The remains of several unidentified victims were buried in a mass grave on February 14 due to health concerns. Authorities announced that displaced residents were to be moved to tent cities pending permanent resettlement.

As of February 22, at least 79 of 93 retrieved bodies were turned over to their families; 14 others remained unidentified.

== Causes and investigations ==
The governor of Davao de Oro, Dorothy Gonzaga, blamed the disaster on heavy rains brought by a shear line and trough of a low pressure area that affected the Davao Region and other parts of Mindanao and had already killed 21 people due to flooding and landslides. The Mines and Geosciences Bureau (MGB) said that the landslide was due to natural causes, particularly persistent rains in the area since January 2024. The landslide area had been declared a "no build zone" after prior landslides in 2007 and 2008 that eroded the area, whose soil is made of remnants of a prehistoric volcanic eruption, and buried the original site of Barangay Masara. It also added that the area where the landslide occurred was traversed by the Philippine Fault. Department of Science and Technology secretary Renato Solidum Jr. also said that the region had been destabilized by major earthquakes in recent months. An evacuation had previously been ordered in the area, but some residents returned to check on their belongings and prepare food.

At a hearing of the House of Representatives on March 12, 2024, the mayor of Maco, Voltaire Rimando said that in 2017 and 2021, the MGB issued geohazard certificates that allowed the local government to rebuild in areas of Barangay Masara that had been affected by the 2008 landslide and was again struck by the 2024 landslide.

A study by World Weather Attribution released on March 1 found that the scale of the disaster was heightened by "a range of human factors". While noting that amount of rain in the region was not "particularly extreme", the situation was exacerbated by factors such as poverty, deforestation, continued construction in 'no-build zones', the tendency of disaster management policies to concentrate on post-disaster response, lapses in scientific monitoring due to budget cuts and the limited impact of weather reporting systems on the ground.

== Reactions ==
Apex Mining clarified that the landslide occurred outside its mining concession, at a distance of 570 meters from the gate of its compound and two to three kilometers from active mine operations. It also pledged to continue operations in the mine and to provide assistance and cooperate with authorities.

President Bongbong Marcos conducted a flyover of the affected site on February 7. He also approved the release of P265 million to help victims of the landslide as well as other disasters brought about by the heavy rains in Mindanao. Vice President Sara Duterte visited an evacuation center in Mawab for those displaced by the landslide on February 9. A command center was set up to deal with the disaster at the office of congressional representative Ruwel Peter Gonzaga, while an incident command post was established in Barangay Elizalde, five kilometers from where the landslide occurred. The Department of Social Welfare and Development released P46 million worth of aid and 69,007 food packs in Davao de Oro. The province was also placed under a state of calamity. All schools in Maco were closed.

The Armed Forces of the Philippines announced that two KC-130J Hercules aircraft of the United States Marine Corps stationed at Villamor Air Base in Pasay were used to delivery humanitarian aid to the affected area as part of the US-PH Maritime Cooperative Activity. The National Bureau of Investigation was also deployed to help identify fatalities.

Caritas Philippines opened bank accounts to collect donations for victims of the landslide and flooding in Mindanao.

Kilusang Mayo Uno called for an investigation as to whether the mine itself and Apex mining company's labor practices contributed to the scale of the disaster.

The UAE provided food supplies to assist those affected by severe rainfall. Mohamed Obaid Alqataam Alzaabi, the UAE Ambassador to the Philippines, emphasized this action was part of the UAE's commitment to offer relief in natural disaster crises, reflecting an ongoing effort to support affected citizens. Rex Gatchalian, Secretary of the Department of Social Welfare and Development of the Philippines, thanked the UAE for its solidarity and humanitarian response during this challenging time.
