= South Arch volcanic field =

Underwater volcanic field south of Hawaiʻi Island

Geography of South Arch volcanic field
- Region: 200 kilometres (120 mi) south from Hawaiʻi Island
- Coordinates: 17°15′N 155°45′W
- Area
  - Total: 1,750 km^{2} (680 sq mi)
  - Land: 0%
  - Water: 100%
- Lowest point: 4,950 m (16,240 ft) below sealevel
- Terrain: Basalt flow with other volcanic features and older sea mounts

South Arch volcanic field is an underwater volcanic field south of Hawaiʻi Island. It was active during the last 10,000 years, and covers an area of 35 by 50 kilometres (22 mi × 31 mi) at a depth of 4,950 metres (16,240 ft).

Although the field is related to the Hawaiian hotspot, it does not appear to be a precursory volcano, but seems to have formed when the weight of the growing Hawaiian volcanoes caused the oceanic crust to buckle, opening up pathways for magma to ascend in front of the hotspot.

== Geomorphology ==
The volcanic field lies about 200 kilometres (120 mi) south from Hawaiʻi Island, at a depth of around 4,950 metres (16,240 ft) below sea level. It covers an area of 35 by 50 kilometres (22 mi × 31 mi). It consists of several metres thick lava flows that are surrounded by sediment-covered seafloor mainly to the north and east and by clusters of Cretaceous seamounts mainly to the west and southwest.

In sidescan sonar images, young lava flows have a bright appearance while older ones are covered by sediments and thus appear darker, and structures identified as lava coils, lava rubble, lava tumuli, pillow lavas, polygons and sheet flows have been observed on young flows. The lava flows have buried the pre-existent seafloor topography, smoothening it, and in one place a flow front rises about 10 metres (33 ft) from the seafloor. The lava flows erupted in the South Arch volcanic field were probably fluid and were produced at high rates. There is no evidence for the presence of a magma chamber at the South Arch volcanic field.

== Geology ==
The volcanic field is located on the crest of the Hawaiian Arch, an area of Cretaceous seafloor around Hawaii which has buckled under the weight of the Hawaiian volcanoes, causing uplift and volcanic activity where the crust has broken up, allowing magma to rise to the surface. The presence of older seamounts in the area of the South Arch volcanic field may have influenced the onset of volcanism in the field. Such eccentric volcanism has also been inferred at other hotspots.

The South Arch volcanic field is not the only volcanic system on the Arch, there is also the much larger North Arch volcanic field north of Oahu and small lava flows at the foot of Pensacola Seamount southwest from Hawaiʻi Island. Together these volcanic fields have a larger surface than the islands of Hawaii and expand the area affected by Hawaiian volcanism to over 500 kilometres (310 mi) width; they have been called "peripheral lavas" of the Hawaii hotspot. The South Arch volcanic field is located upstream of the Hawaiian hotspot and has been described as "precursory" although it does not appear to be an early stage of a typical Hawaiian shield volcano.

=== Composition ===
Dredging has yielded basaltic rocks which define alkali basalt and basanite suites. The flows contain phenocrysts of clinopyroxene, iddingsite, olivine, plagioclase and sometimes spinel. Lava flows are covered by manganese crusts less than 0.15 millimetres (0.0059 in) thick. They often display traces of alteration and formation of glasses such as palagonite. Some dredge samples might come from neighbouring Cretaceous seamounts rather than the South Arch volcanic field, however.

The alkalic composition of the lavas resembles that of rejuvenated stage volcanics on Kauai, that of preshield volcanics at Kamaʻehuakanaloa Seamount (formerly Loihi) and that of the North Arch volcanic field; they share with the latter a high ratio of helium-3/helium-4 and a high carbon dioxide content. Mixing between mantle plume melts of the Hawaiian hotspot and components typical of mid-ocean ridge basalts may have given rise to the volcanics of the South Arch volcanic field, with metasomatism involved as well. The magmas of the South Arch volcanic field appear to have been unusually water-rich, perhaps because of an early melting of water-rich mantle.

== Eruption and research history ==
The field appears to consist of some central younger lava flows which are surrounded by older lava flow fields. Based on the thickness of manganese, palagonite and sediment cover on lava flows, it appears that younger flows are 10,000–1,000 years old, while the older flows may be over 10,000–100,000 years old; in general the thickness of manganese crusts is comparable to these found on Mauna Loa, Kilauea and Kamaʻehuakanaloa rocks. Another age range cited in the literature is 14,000–20,000 years ago. It is possible that magma ascended to the surface mainly in areas where the lithosphere has anomalous properties and is more likely to crack rather than to flex; this would explain why the vents of the South Arch volcanic field coincide with Cretaceous seamounts.

The South Arch volcanic field was discovered in 1986 through GLORIA sidescan sonar imaging and dredged in 1988. Another investigation by the Kaikō remotely operated underwater vehicle took place in 2001; in general the field has been explored by dredging, remotely operated underwater vehicle and submersible.
