= 2015 Bahia landslide =

Natural disaster in Brazil

- Location of Bahia in Brazil
- Date: 28 April 2015
- Location: Salvador, Bahia, Brazil
- Deaths: 14

Location of Salvador in Bahia state

The 2015 Bahia landslide occurred on 28 April 2015 in Salvador, Bahia, Brazil. The landslide killed at least 14 people.
