= 2023 Stenungsund landslide =

Quick clay landslide in Sweden

- Date: 23 September 2023
- Time: 01:40 (CEST)
- Location: Stenungsund, Bohuslän, Sweden; 58°03′31″N 11°52′44″E
- Type: Landslide
- Cause: Quick clay
- Outcome: Section of European route E6 destroyed, two buildings and several vehicles damaged
- Injuries: Three
- Suspects: Three

At 01:40 on 23 September 2023, there was a landslide at Stenungsund junction near Stenungsund, Sweden. This quick clay landslide damaged a section of about 400 x 600 metres, affecting European route E6. The landslide also damaged a fuel station, a Burger King restaurant, several cars, parked trucks and a bus. A helicopter, specialist teams and search dogs were involved in rescue effort. Three people were hospitalised by the landslide with minor injuries and shock.

A subsequent investigation into the landslide revealed that approximately 170,000 tonnes of excavated material was dumped on an area under construction, whereas only 50,000 tonnes were permitted to be left in the area according to the construction license. Three people were suspected of gross public dangerous devastation, gross causing bodily harm and unauthorized environmental activities.

== Background ==
=== Quick clay ===
Quick clay is found below the marine level, which refers to the sea level at the end of the last ice age. It refers to a number of clays found in several countries in the northern hemisphere, including Sweden. At that time, approximately 20,000 years ago, the Scandinavian Peninsula was covered by a layer of ice. When that layer of ice began to melt, small particles of clay flowed with it and was deposited in salt water along the coast. The salt caused the deposited clay to become highly unstable.

With the weight of the ice dissipating as it melted, the land below it began to slowly rise up to where the coast is now between 220 and 300 metres above the marine level. Due to the elevation of the land, the clay became exposed and the salt within it was washed away by fresh water, drastically affecting the strength of the clay.

When undisturbed, quick clay behaves like a solid, however when placed under sufficient stress it acts more like a fluid through a process known as soil liquefaction. Multiple factors can contribute to this stress, such as overloading, erosion, rainfalls, slope undercutting and earthquakes.

Quick clay has been the cause of a number of landslides and sinkholes, with 250 such sites being identified in a 60 kilometre radius of Ottawa. Notable examples of incidents caused by quick clay include the 1908 Notre-Dame-de-la-Salette landslide, the deadliest in Canada, which killed at least 35 and destroyed 16 homes and the 2020 Gjerdrum landslide in Ask, Norway which killed 10 and destroyed more than 30 homes.

=== Stenungsund and nearby landslides ===
The area surrounding Stenungsund is prone to quick clay landslides, with several large landslides occurring in the area in the past. Göran Sällfors, Professor Emeritus of Geology and Geotechnics at Chalmers University of Technology, identified a similarity to a landslide that occurred in 2006 approximately 50 kilometres north in Småröd, with the cause being "large amounts of excavated material being piled up by a building company".

In 2013, Norconsult surveyed the area to measure its strength, finding that the ground near to the E6 was "sensitive". The Västra Götaland County administrative board had previously stated to the local municipality that the land was unsuitable for development in 2020 and that there was a risk for a landslide to occur, with the Swedish Geotechnical Institute concurring. After the Stenungsund municipality made some changes, the administrative board decided against blocking the permission to develop the land. In both of these applications, documents pertaining to the surveys done by Norconsult were absent. Stenungsund municipality stated that these documents were absent due to the fact that construction would not be taking place in those areas, and that no recent measurements were made relating to the stability of the area. The construction license allowed for 30,000 tonnes of excavated materials to remain on site in designated areas.

=== European route E6 ===
The E6 follows a 3,056 kilometre route from Kirkenes, Norway in the north, near to the Russian border, and to Trelleborg in the south of Sweden. According to the Swedish Transport Authority (STA), prior to the landslide approximately 20,000 vehicles used the E6 daily.

== Landslide ==
At 01:40 on 23 September 2023, a measuring station in Tjörn, part of the Swedish national seismic network, registered registered a landslide lasting for almost a minute. At 01:45, emergency services were alerted to what was originally reported as a sinkhole in the area of the E6 at Stenungsund. It was later discovered to be a landslide that had affected an area of approximately 400 x 600 metres.

The landslide affected a wooded area, damaged a nearby gas station, caused the partial collapse of the roof of a Burger King and caused damage to the E6, destroying it in several places. Despite the damage to the gas station, experts reported to police that no pipes were ruptured and no fuel was spilled.

Approximately 10 vehicles were affected by the landslide, including seven cars, lorries that were parked in a rest area and a bus which had no passengers at the time. Several of the vehicles and the truck fell into damaged sections of road caused by the landslide, while others and the bus were pushed off the road.

At the time, experts were concerned that further landslides could be caused by the instability of the ground and the heavy rainfall over the days prior.

Fire personnel and a helicopter were dispatched to assist in rescuing any victims. All of the victims were extricated from their vehicles by rescuers and a helicopter. Three people were later hospitalised with minor injuries and shock. Specially trained personnel and search dogs were later dispatched to search the area for any victims trapped in the debris left by the landslide.

The affected area of the E6 was closed, and drivers were advised on detours in the area. A spokesperson for the Swedish police stated that the incident was expected to cause "enormous" consequences for traffic in the area for the foreseeable future. Due to the complete destruction of the road in several places, it was believed that it would be a long time before a permanent fix could be completed.

== Aftermath ==
Following the landslide, the STA appointed COWI to investigate the area and to plan the rebuilding of the E6, appointing Peab to carry out the rebuilding itself. The Swedish government also provided the STA with an additional SEK1 billion (US$116.55 million) so that the road could be reconstructed without impairing planned maintenance in other areas. Nine vehicles and a bus that became trapped as a result of the landslide were not recovered until 21 December, 2023, three months after the landslide occurred, as the area was still deemed too unsafe.

As the E6 is the main arterial motorway connecting Gothenburg in Sweden and Oslo in Norway, a large amount of truck traffic ended up on local road O650, through Ucklum and onto European route E45, with between 10,000 and 15,000 people travelling through Ucklum daily. Long distance trucks were diverted via Trollhättan and Uddevalla, on Road 44 and 45, with both heavy truck traffic on unsuitable roads and overtaking in unsafe areas causing safety concerns among people living in small villages and drivers alike.

On 14 November 2023, there was an accident in which a head on collision occurred between a bus and a car on O650, with a woman being transported to hospital by helicopter with serious injuries.

The original plan was for the damaged sections of the E6 to be repaired by the end of 2024, however this was completed ahead of schedule, leading to a revised aim for the road to be reopened by mid-2024. In an effort to improve stability, a layer of crushed, recycled glass several metres deep was placed below the road. King Carl XVI Gustaf, Infrastructure and Housing Minister Andreas Carlson and Director General of the STA Roberto Maiorana attended a ceremony to officially reopen the road on 3 July that year, announcing that it would be open to traffic on 5 July. Traffic was officially released at 03:00 that day, and over 100 Ucklum residents hosted a celebration "with sausages and bouncy castles".

Sveriges Television news reported that "the final bill for Stenungsund municipality would be almost SEK300 million (US$34.97 million)."

A building materials store neighbouring the Burger King survived mostly without damage, but due to the damage of the roadway no delivery trucks can drive onto Ucklumsvägen, so this shop remains closed as of October 2024, more than a year after the landslide.

== Investigation ==
The cause of the landslide was initially unclear, with Swedish media identifying that blasting and excavation had been taking place at the business park development and the heavy rainfall that had been ongoing over the days prior. At 14:00 on 20 September 2023, the measuring station at Tjörn identified an explosion in a rock pit two kilometres north of the site of the landslide, with a further explosion being identified the following day at 16:40 west of the E6 near to the site of the landslide. Four explosions had occurred that month.

Police launched a preliminary investigation into the construction site, aiming to ascertain whether the soil excavated during construction was stored in the predesignated areas as per the construction license and whether it affected the landslide at all. On 3 October, 2023, the Swedish Accident Investigation Authority (SHK) launched their own investigation. As per a report released on 23 September, 2024, the investigation was still ongoing.

On 28 March, 2024, prosecutor Daniel Veivo Pettersson stated in a press conference that he believed "human factors" had caused the landslide, as "no natural cause" had been found during the investigation and that "At this stage, we consider it negligent, in this case grossly negligent, to have placed so much excavated material on the site". The additional excavated material weighed approximately 170,000 tons and had not originated from the business park development, instead originating from a separate construction project in the Stenungsund municipality.

The companies building the business park had been paid to transport the materials away from the separate project, which they then dumped at the business park development. He added that three people were suspected of "gross public dangerous devastation, gross causing bodily harm and unauthorized environmental activities", of which all three denied.

The final report by the SHK confirmed that the causes of the landslide were the overloading of the ground above the motorway, a "lack of consideration for ground conditions" and that rainfall over the prior days likely contributed.
