= Nuʻuanu Slide =

Submarine landslide off O'ahu, Hawai'i

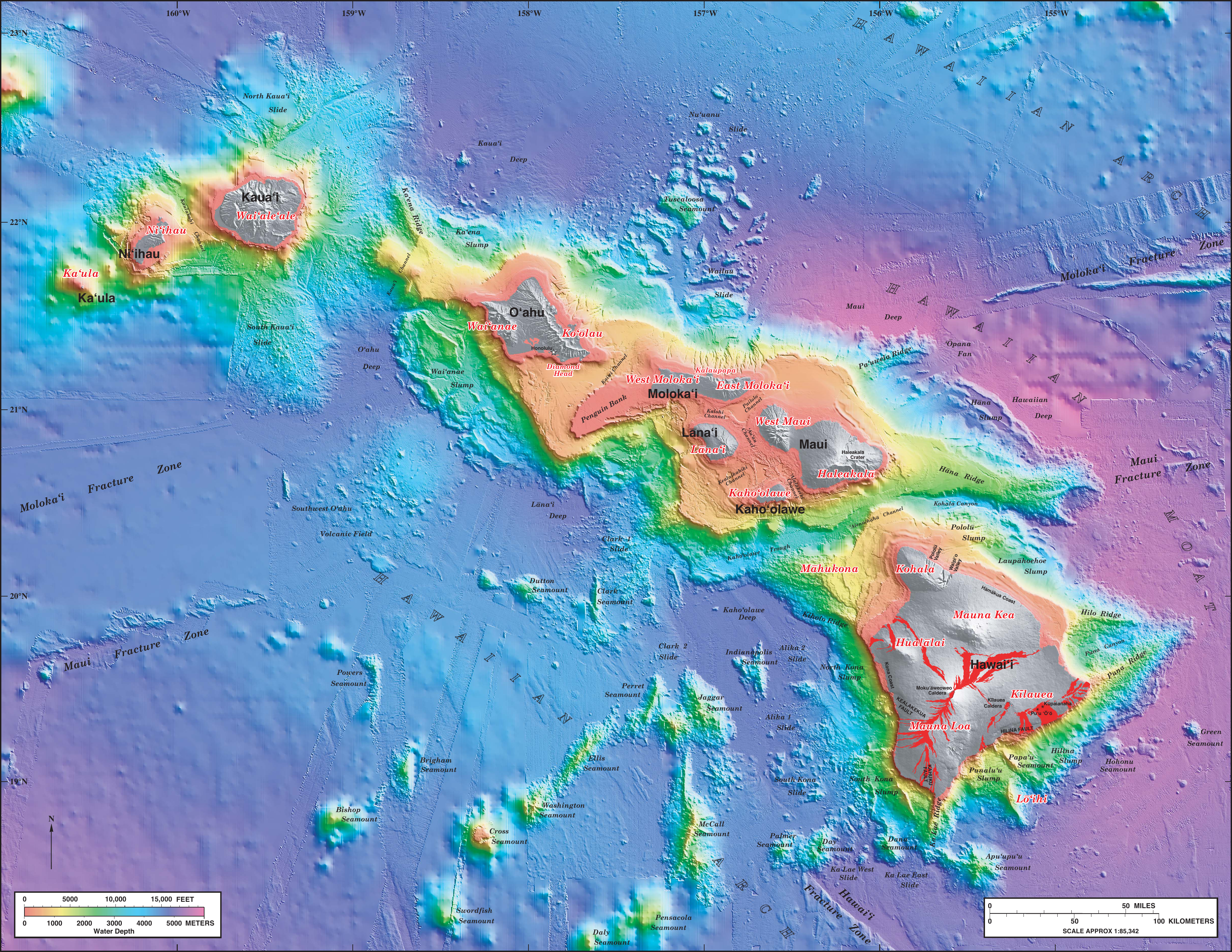
Nuʻuanu Slide is seen near the center top in this bathymetry image of the Hawaiian archipelago,

Nuʻuanu Slide or Nuʻuanu Debris Avalanche is the largest of seventeen known submarine landslides around the Hawaiian Islands and at 200 kilometers (124 mi) in length, one of the largest landslides on Earth. It broke from the eastern or windward side of Oʻahu, Hawaiʻi between 1 and 1.5 million years ago and lies in the Pacific Ocean north of Molokaʻi.

== Collapse ==
At the time of collapse, Oʻahu was part of the conglomerate island Maui Nui, elevated above the ocean from lower sea levels, and contained the Koʻolau Volcano. The eastern half of the mountain collapsed nearly in half at the caldera. The remains of the eastern half of the caldera is now Kāneʻohe Bay and the new western side is the Koʻolau Range above the bay, including observation point Nuʻuanu Pali. Though the remaining ridge appears to be a steep and weathered fault scarp, evidence suggests the geographic features are from wind and water rather than the landslide event. The volcano collapsed nearly in half at the caldera with the eastern half falling into the ocean cataclysmically with enough force to send debris, part of which forms the massive Tuscaloosa Seamount, across the ocean floor and up a ridge. This landslide created a massive tsunami which ravaged the islands and possibly the Western coast of ancient North America.

== Causes ==
The volcanoes of the Hawaiian islands have large sizes with relatively steep submarine slopes, causing them to be gravitationally unstable and prone to collapse, generating some of the largest landslides on Earth. This can be seen with dozens of giant landslides with deposits extending more than 200 kilometers from the main islands, with a new landslide roughly every 350,000 years.
