= Reformed Church of Saint-Symphorien =

Reformed church building in Saint-Saphorin, Vaud, Switzerland

- Église réformée Saint-Symphorien (French)
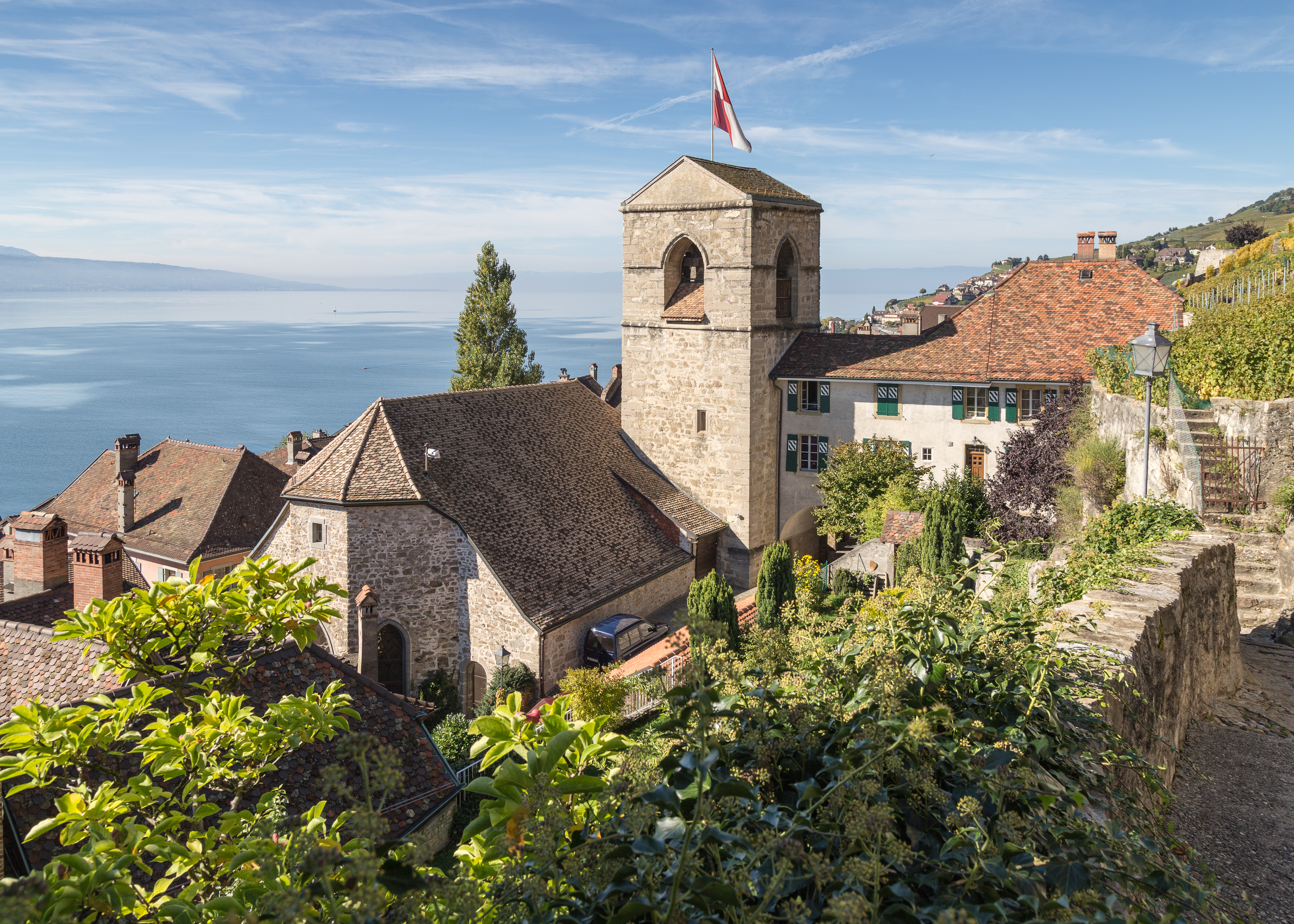
- Reformed church of Saint-Saphorin

- Location within Switzerland Location within Canton of Vaud
- 46°28′24″N 06°47′48″E
- Type: Parish church of the Evangelical Reformed Church of the Canton of Vaud
- Location: Saint-Saphorin, canton of Vaud, Switzerland

History
- Built: around 590

Swiss Cultural Property of National Significance
- Official name: Église réformée Saint-Symphorien avec villa gallo-romaine et cure
- Criteria: Class A
- Reference no.: 6489

The Reformed Church of Saint-Symphorien (French: église réformée Saint-Symphorien) is a Protestant church in Saint-Saphorin, canton of Vaud, Switzerland. It is listed as a heritage site of national significance.

== History ==
The first Catholic church in the region of Lavaux was established by Marius of Avenches around 590 and was dedicated to the Symphorian of Autun, as was the church of Avenches. Later, the church gave its name to the village which was previously called Glérolles (Glerula in Latin).

Between the 12th century and the 1536 conquest by the canton of Bern, the village and the church belonged to the Bishops of Lausanne whose last titular, Sebastian of Montfalcon, is shown kneeling in front of the Virgin Mary on the main stained glass of the church. After 1536 and the introduction of the Reformation, the church was used by the Protestants. At this time, Saint-Saphorin was the seat of a parish that included the villages of Rivaz, Chexbres and Puidoux until 1734 when Chexbres and Puidoux formed an independent parish. In 2000, the older parish was re-united under its former name, Saint-Saphorin.

The church of Saint-Symphorien was listed among the Cultural Property of National Significance (Class A), as were the remains of the Gallo-Roman villa located on the site until a tidal wave caused Mount Tauredunum to collapse in 563.

== See also ==
- List of cultural property of national significance in Switzerland: Vaud
