= Saint-Saphorin Roman Villa =

Roman villa in the Lavaux region, Switzerland

- Villa romaine de Saint-Saphorin (French)
- Location within Switzerland Location within Canton of Vaud
- 46°28′24″N 06°47′46″E
- Type: Roman villa
- Location: Saint-Saphorin, canton of Vaud, Switzerland

History
- Built: 1st century

Site notes
- Architectural style: Ancient Roman

Swiss Cultural Property of National Significance
- Official name: Église réformée Saint-Symphorien avec villa gallo-romaine et cure
- Criteria: Class A
- Reference no.: 6489

The Saint-Saphorin Roman Villa (French: villa romaine de Saint-Saphorin) was a Roman villa in the village of Saint-Saphorin in the Lavaux region, canton of Vaud, Switzerland. It is listed as a heritage site of national significance alongside the Reformed Church of Saint-Symphorien and the neighbouring vicarage.

== History ==
The earliest evidence of human activity in the region date back to 1500 or 1600 BC, as showed by the pilotis excavated in 1893. However, the history of the village of Glerula dates back to the Roman era. At this time, the area was a stage on the route that connected Italy to Gaul through the Great St Bernard Pass. Archaeologists excavated the remains of a Roman villa of the 1st century, as well as a Roman milestone dated 53 CE. In the 5th century, the building was transformed into a Christian mausoleum which was entirely re-built after the tidal wave that caused Mount Tauredunum to collapse in 563: around 590, Bishop of Lausanne Marius of Avenches established a new church over the remains of the former building. The church, dedicated to Symphorian of Autun, later gave its name to the village.

The Roman villa, as well as the Reformed Church and the neighbouring vicarage were listed among the Cultural Property of National Significance.

== See also ==
- Gallo-Roman culture
- Switzerland in the Roman era
- List of cultural property of national significance in Switzerland: Vaud

== Bibliography ==
- Eggenberger, Peter; Laurent (1992). "Saint-Saphorin en Lavaux : le site gallo-romain et les édifices qui ont précédé l'église : réinterprétation des fouilles de 1968-1969". Cahiers d'archéologie romande. Loisirs et pédagogie : Atelier d'archéologie médiévale (in French) (56). Lausanne.
