= Rivaz railway station =

Railway station in Rivaz, Switzerland

Rivaz
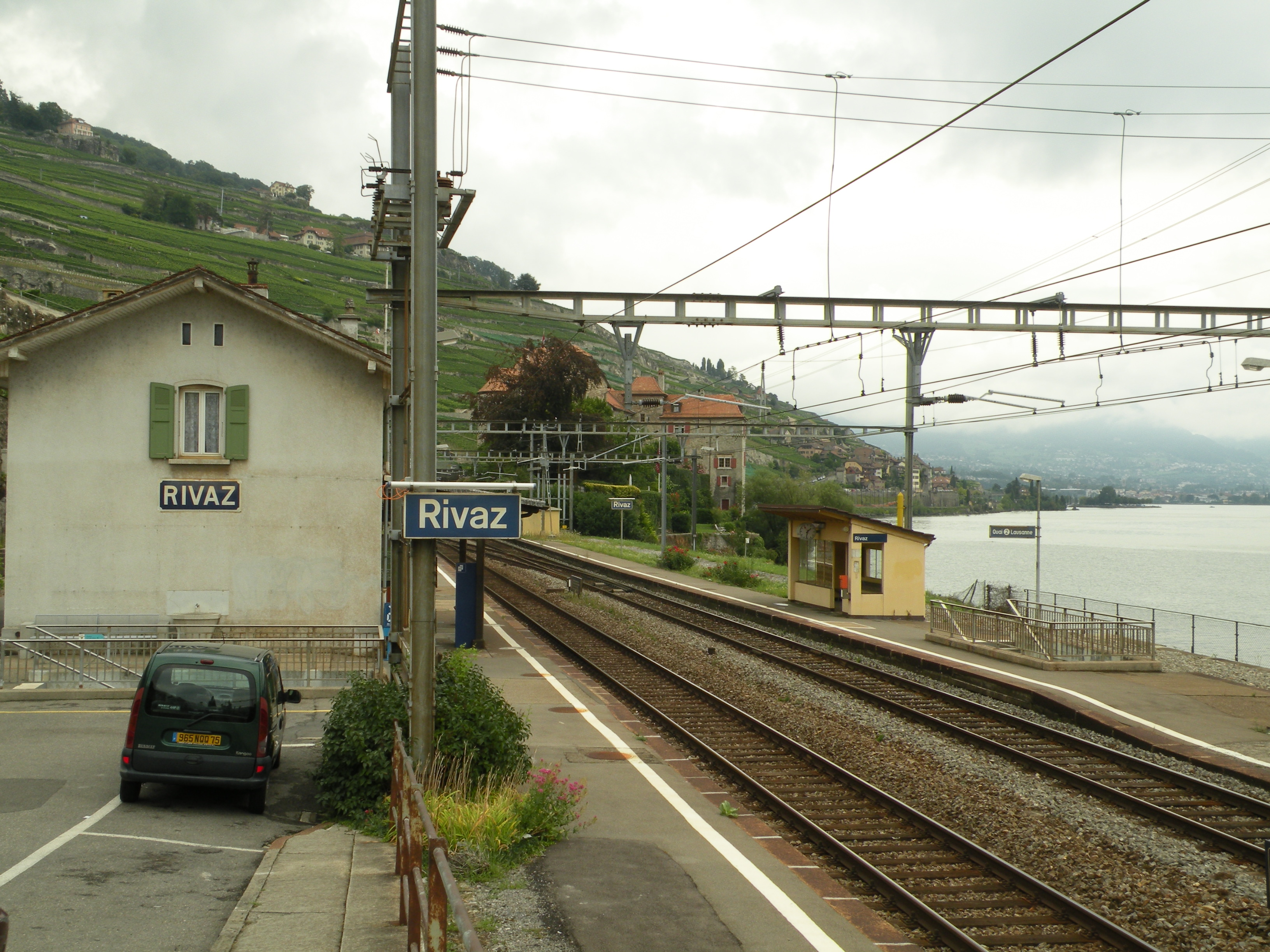
- The station in 2009

General information
- Location: Rivaz; Switzerland
- Coordinates: 46°28′27″N 6°47′05″E
- Elevation: 377 m (1,237 ft)
- Owner: Swiss Federal Railways
- Line: Simplon line
- Distance: 13.6 km (8.5 mi) from Lausanne
- Platforms: 2 (2 side platforms)
- Tracks: 2
- Train operators: Swiss Federal Railways
- Connections: CGN ferries

Construction
- Parking: Yes (11 spaces)
- Accessible: Yes

Other information
- Station code: 8501126 (RIV)
- Fare zone: 64 and 71 (mobilis)

Passengers
- 2023: 230 per weekday (SBB)

Services
Preceding station	RER Vaud	Following station
Epesses towards Le Brassus or Vallorbe	R4	St-Saphorin towards Vevey
Location

Rivaz railway station (French: Gare de Rivaz) is a railway station in the municipality of Rivaz, in the Swiss canton of Vaud. It is an intermediate stop on the standard gauge Simplon line of Swiss Federal Railways.

== Services ==
As of the December 2024 timetable change, the following services stop at Rivaz:

- RER Vaud R4: hourly service between Le Brassus and Bex; hourly service to Vallorbe on weekdays; limited service from Bex to St-Maurice.
