= Pampigny Castle =

- Hautemorges
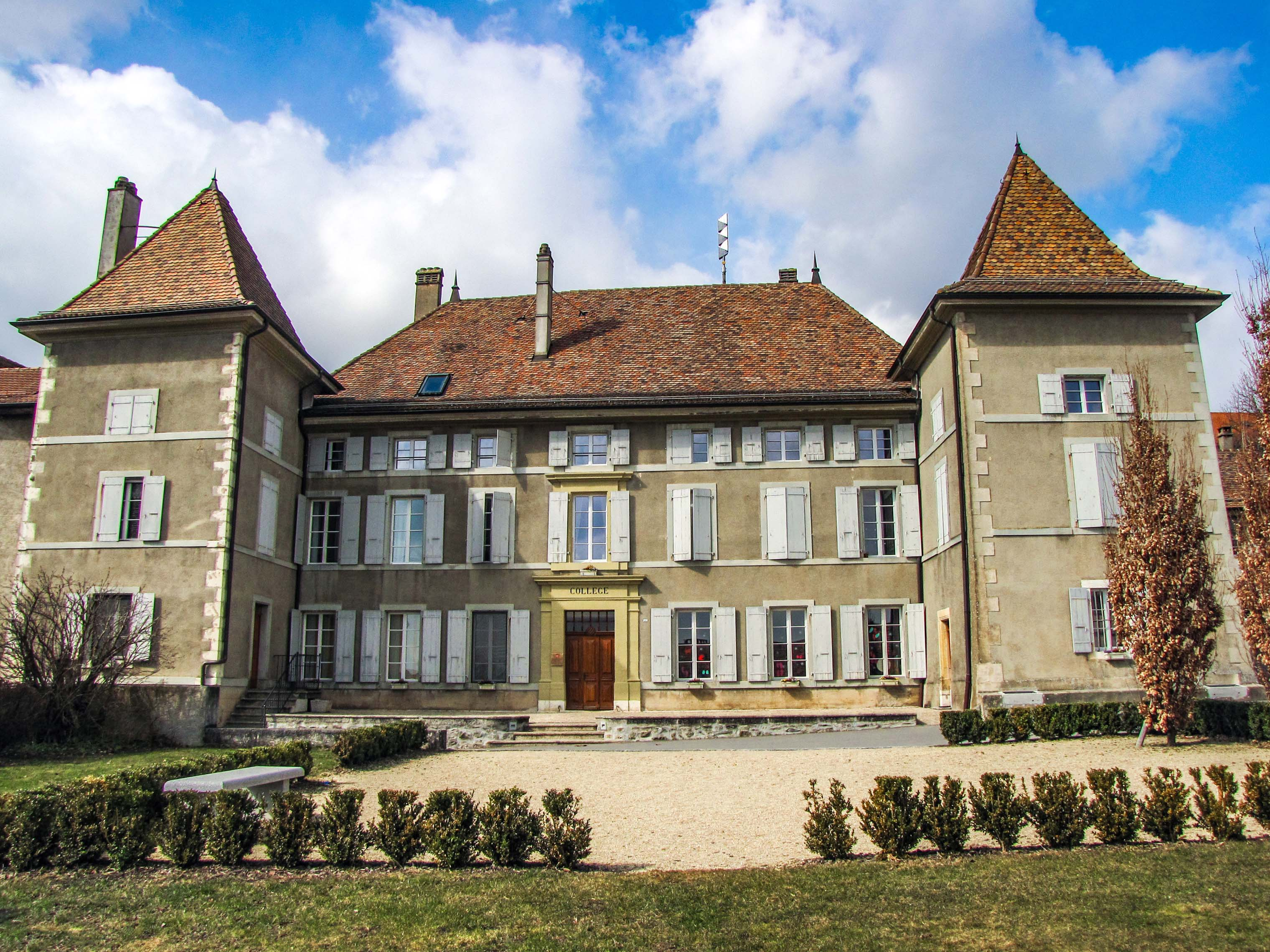
- Pampigny castle

Site information
- Code: CH-VD
- Condition: Used as a school

Location
- Coordinates: 46.5811°N 6.4289°E

Site history
- Built: 13th/17th century

Pampigny Castle is a castle in the former municipality of Pampigny (now part of Hautemorges) of the Canton of Vaud in Switzerland.

== History ==
The first castle was probably built in the 13th century on the hill above the current castle, near the Pampigny village church. The first recorded lord of Pampigny is mentioned in 1228 as a vassal of Jean de Cossonay. Very little is recorded about their castle or the family. Around 1400 Pampigny and the castle were acquired through marriage by the Moudon family and sold in 1439 to Jean de Menthon, the lord of Aubonne. In 1560 the estates and castle were acquired by the family of Mestral d'Aruffens. Around this time the first castle was replaced with the second castle which was located at the foot of the original castle hill. The village church was built on the site of the first castle. While the date of construction of the second castle is unknown, the Late-Gothic style church indicates that it happened before the Renaissance reached the area. One wall of the second castle remains with two windows which are marked with the date 1688.

In the late 17th century the Mestral family built the third castle which incorporated the wall with windows from the second. In 1737 Gabriel-Henri de Mestral left the castle at Pampigny and moved to Saint-Saphorin. The castle became the residence of a steward who administered the extensive land-holdings associated with the castle. After the 1798 French invasion of Switzerland, the nobility lost much of their land and power though the family retained the castle. In 1837 the municipality bought the castle from the Mestral family for 22,000 francs and used it as a school.

== Castle site ==
The castle consists of a large central hall with two square towers projecting forward and forming a small square courtyard, surrounded on three sides. The height of second floor of the castle is less than the first/ground floor, possibly as a way to reduce construction costs while keeping an additional story.

== See also ==
- List of castles in Switzerland
- Château
