= Saint-Saphorin =

- Municipality
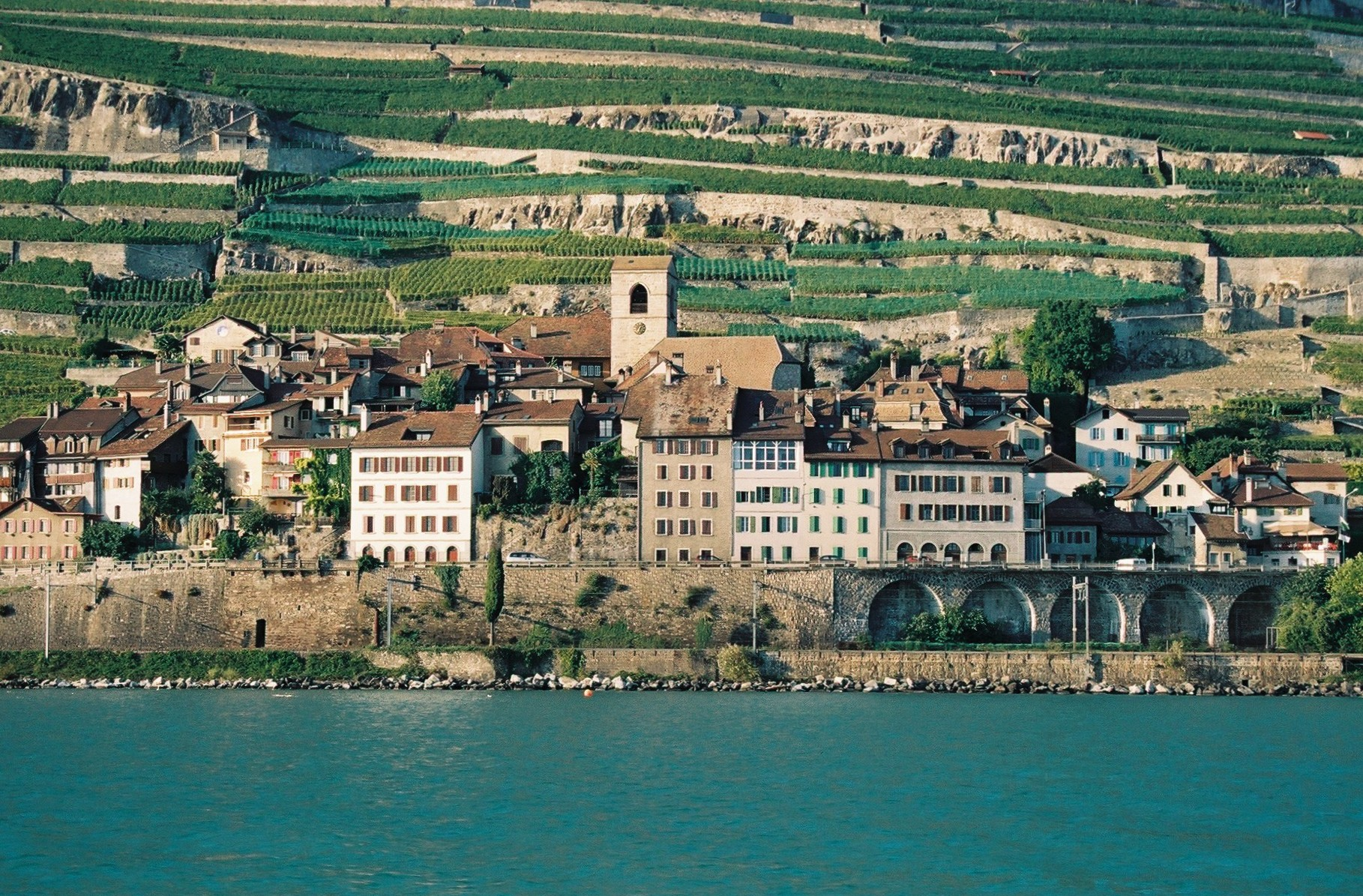
- Saint-Saphorin village

- Flag Coat of arms
- Location of Saint-Saphorin
- Location within Switzerland Location within Canton of Vaud
- Coordinates: 46°28′N 6°48′E
- Country: Switzerland
- Canton: Vaud
- District: Lavaux-Oron

Government
  - Mayor: Syndic; Gérald Vallélian

Area
  - Total: 0.89 km^{2} (0.34 sq mi)
- Elevation: 400 m (1,300 ft)

Population (2000)
  - Total: 348
  - Density: 390/km^{2} (1,000/sq mi)
- Demonym: Les Saint-Saphoriens
- Time zone: UTC+01:00 (CET)
  - Summer (DST): UTC+02:00 (CEST)
- Postal code: 1071
- SFOS number: 5610
- ISO 3166 code: CH-VD
- Surrounded by: Chardonne, Chexbres, Puidoux, Rivaz, Saint-Gingolph (FR-74)
- Website: https://www.saint-saphorin.ch Profile (in French), SFSO statistics

Saint-Saphorin (French pronunciation: [sɛ̃safɔʁɛ̃]) is a municipality in the Swiss canton of Vaud, located on the shore of Lake Geneva, in the district of Lavaux-Oron.

== History ==
Glerula or Calarona (from Latin: glarea, 'gravel') was a Gallo-Roman village. The chroniclers Gregory of Tours and Marius of Avenches described what is now called the Tauredunum event of 563. A landslip into the eastern end of Lake Geneva caused a tsunami which swept along the lake causing immense damage. Glerula was among the villages which were destroyed. It was never rebuilt. Instead, a new community was founded a short distance to the east, taking its name from the new church there, dedicated to Saint-Symphorien. That name has, with the passage of years, transformed into Saint-Saphorin.

Saint-Saphorin (Lavaux) is first mentioned in 1138 as de Sancto Sufforiano.

== Geography ==
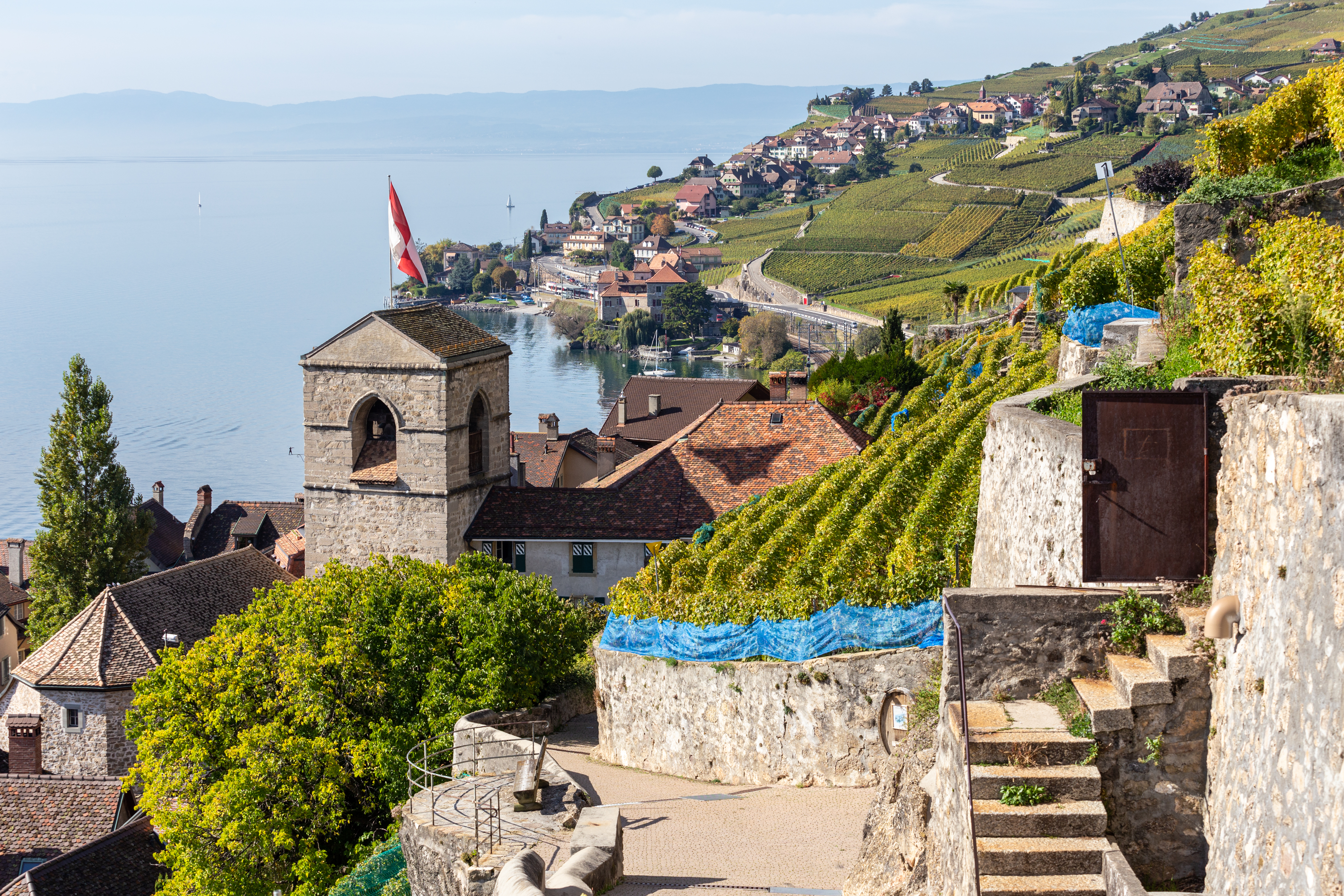
Reformed church and the Lavaux vineyard terraces.

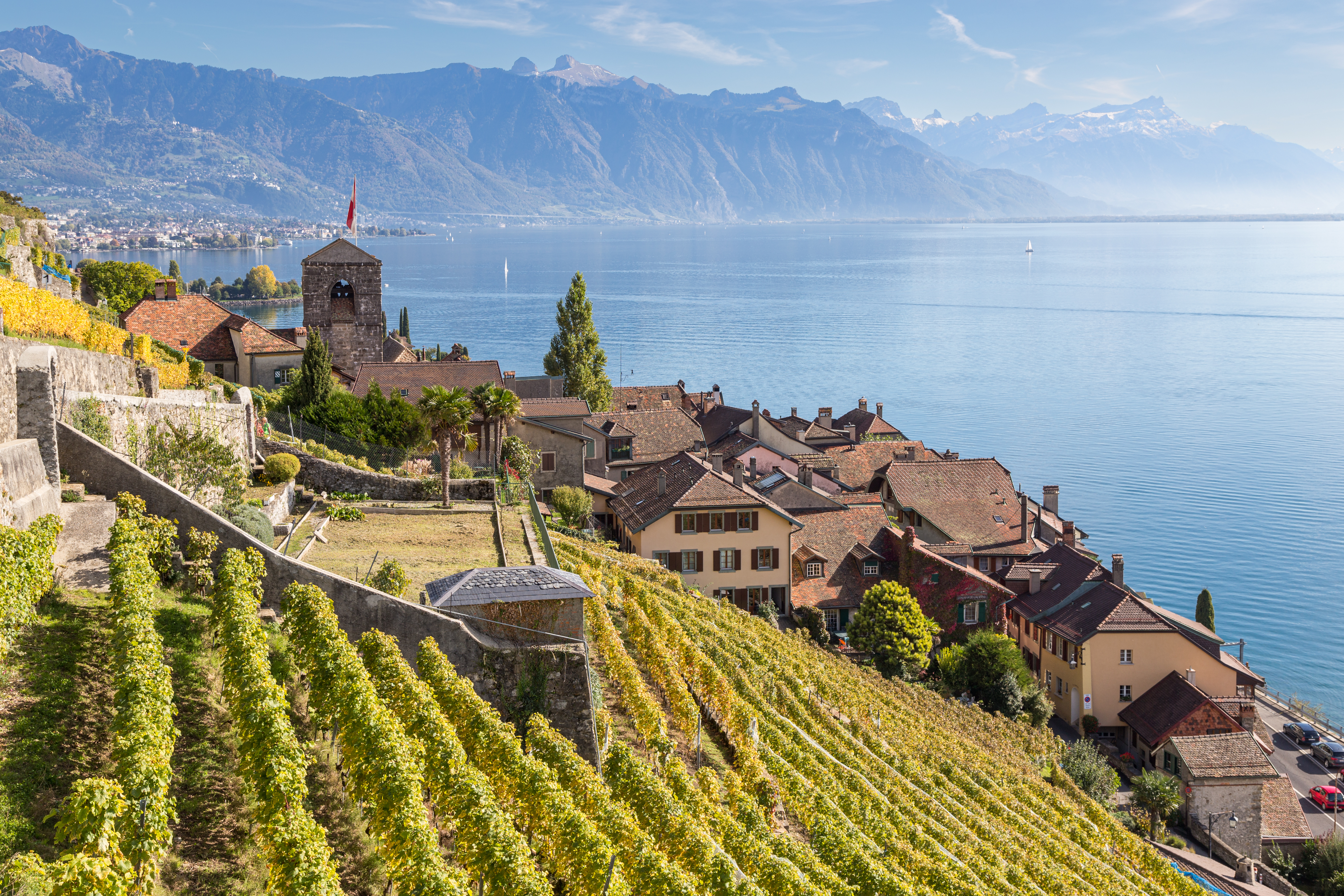
St-Saphorin (Lavaux)

Aerial view (1971)

Saint-Saphorin (Lavaux) has an area, as of 2009, of 0.89 square kilometres (0.34 mi^{2}). Of this area, 0.5 km^{2} (0.19 mi^{2}) or 56.2% is used for agricultural purposes, while 0.1 km^{2} (0.039 mi^{2}) or 11.2% is forested. Of the rest of the land, 0.27 km^{2} (0.10 mi^{2}) or 30.3% is settled (buildings or roads).

Of the built up area, housing and buildings made up 11.2% and transportation infrastructure made up 18.0%. while parks, green belts and sports fields made up 1.1%. Out of the forested land, 9.0% of the total land area is heavily forested and 2.2% is covered with orchards or small clusters of trees. Of the agricultural land, 11.2% is used for growing crops and 12.4% is pastures, while 32.6% is used for orchards or vine crops.

The municipality was part of the Lavaux District until it was dissolved on 31 August 2006, and Saint-Saphorin (Lavaux) became part of the new district of Lavaux-Oron.

It consists of the village of Saint-Saphorin and the hamlets of Glérolles, Les Faverges, Ogoz and Lignières.

== Coat of arms ==
The blazon of the municipal coat of arms is Per fess Argent and Gules, overall a Bend wavy counterchanged.

== Demographics ==
Saint-Saphorin (Lavaux) has a population (as of December 2020) of 389. As of 2008, 24.9% of the population are resident foreign nationals. Over the last 10 years (1999–2009 ) the population has changed at a rate of 2.2%. It has changed at a rate of -5% due to migration and at a rate of 6.6% due to births and deaths.

Most of the population (as of 2000) speaks French (307 or 88.2%), with German being second most common (19 or 5.5%) and English being third (10 or 2.9%). There are 2 people who speak Italian.

Of the population in the municipality 97 or about 27.9% were born in Saint-Saphorin (Lavaux) and lived there in 2000. There were 119 or 34.2% who were born in the same canton, while 63 or 18.1% were born somewhere else in Switzerland, and 61 or 17.5% were born outside of Switzerland.

In 2008 there were 4 live births to Swiss citizens and 3 births to non-Swiss citizens, and in same time span there were 2 deaths of Swiss citizens. Ignoring immigration and emigration, the population of Swiss citizens increased by 2 while the foreign population increased by 3. There were 2 Swiss men who emigrated from Switzerland and 1 Swiss woman who immigrated back to Switzerland. At the same time, there were 3 non-Swiss men and 8 non-Swiss women who immigrated from another country to Switzerland. The total Swiss population change in 2008 (from all sources, including moves across municipal borders) was a decrease of 21 and the non-Swiss population increased by 15 people. This represents a population growth rate of -1.6%.

The age distribution of the population (as of 2000) is children and teenagers (0–19 years old) make up 20.7% of the population, while adults (20–64 years old) make up 66.1% and seniors (over 64 years old) make up 13.2%.

As of 2000, there were 144 people who were single and never married in the municipality. There were 148 married individuals, 16 widows or widowers and 40 individuals who are divorced.

As of 2000, there were 159 private households in the municipality, and an average of 2.1 persons per household. There were 60 households that consist of only one person and 7 households with five or more people. Out of a total of 164 households that answered this question, 36.6% were households made up of just one person. Of the rest of the households, there are 49 married couples without children, 40 married couples with children There were 8 single parents with a child or children. There were 2 households that were made up of unrelated people and 5 households that were made up of some sort of institution or another collective housing.

In 2000 there were 53 single family homes (or 48.2% of the total) out of a total of 110 inhabited buildings. There were 39 multi-family buildings (35.5%), along with 12 multi-purpose buildings that were mostly used for housing (10.9%) and 6 other use buildings (commercial or industrial) that also had some housing (5.5%). Of the single family homes 37 were built before 1919, while 3 were built between 1990 and 2000. The most multi-family homes (28) were built before 1919 and the next most (3) were built between 1961 and 1970.

In 2000 there were 198 apartments in the municipality. The most common apartment size was 4 rooms of which there were 54. There were 15 single room apartments and 49 apartments with five or more rooms. Of these apartments, a total of 152 apartments (76.8% of the total) were permanently occupied, while 41 apartments (20.7%) were seasonally occupied and 5 apartments (2.5%) were empty. As of 2009, the construction rate of new housing units was 0 new units per 1000 residents. The vacancy rate for the municipality, in 2010, was 3.03%.

The historical population is given in the following chart:

== Heritage sites of national significance ==
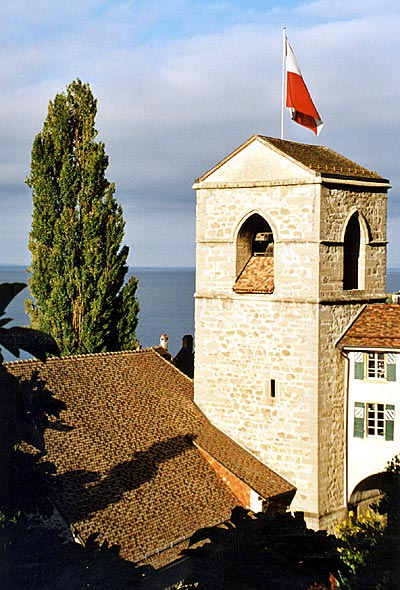
Swiss Reformed Church of Saint-Symphorien

The Swiss Reformed Church of Saint-Symphorien with a Gallo-Roman villa as well as part of the UNESCO World Heritage Site: Lavaux, Vineyard Terraces are listed as Swiss heritage site of national significance. The entire village of Saint-Saphorin is part of the Inventory of Swiss Heritage Sites.

== Politics ==
In the 2007 federal election the most popular party was the SP which received 27.84% of the vote. The next three most popular parties were the FDP (19.92%), the Green Party (17.15%) and the SVP (9.64%). In the federal election, a total of 138 votes were cast, and the voter turnout was 57.5%.

== Economy ==
As of 2010, Saint-Saphorin (Lavaux) had an unemployment rate of 1.6%. As of 2008, there were 28 people employed in the primary economic sector and about 6 businesses involved in this sector. 1 person was employed in the secondary sector and there was 1 business in this sector. 46 people were employed in the tertiary sector, with 12 businesses in this sector. There were 205 residents of the municipality who were employed in some capacity, of which females made up 46.3% of the workforce.

In 2008 the total number of full-time equivalent jobs was 63. The number of jobs in the primary sector was 20, all of which were in agriculture. The number of jobs in the secondary sector was 1, all of which were in manufacturing. The number of jobs in the tertiary sector was 42. In the tertiary sector; 9 or 21.4% were in wholesale or retail sales or the repair of motor vehicles, 21 or 50.0% were in a hotel or restaurant, 7 or 16.7% were in the information industry, 1 was the insurance or financial industry, 1 was a technical professional or scientist.

In 2000, there were 10 workers who commuted into the municipality and 148 workers who commuted away. The municipality is a net exporter of workers, with about 14.8 workers leaving the municipality for every one entering. Of the working population, 16.6% used public transportation to get to work, and 60% used a private car.

== Religion ==
From the 2000 census, 80 or 23.0% were Roman Catholic, while 194 or 55.7% belonged to the Swiss Reformed Church. Of the rest of the population, there were 3 members of an Orthodox church (or about 0.86% of the population), and there were 4 individuals (or about 1.15% of the population) who belonged to another Christian church. There was 1 individual who was Jewish, and 60 (or about 17.24% of the population) belonged to no church, are agnostic or atheist, and 8 individuals (or about 2.30% of the population) did not answer the question.

== Education ==
In Saint-Saphorin (Lavaux) about 144 or (41.4%) of the population have completed non-mandatory upper secondary education, and 69 or (19.8%) have completed additional higher education (either university or a Fachhochschule). Of the 69 who completed tertiary schooling, 44.9% were Swiss men, 36.2% were Swiss women, 13.0% were non-Swiss men.

In the 2009/2010 school year there were a total of 32 students in the Saint-Saphorin (Lavaux) school district. In the Vaud cantonal school system, two years of non-obligatory pre-school are provided by the political districts. During the school year, the political district provided pre-school care for a total of 665 children of which 232 children (34.9%) received subsidized pre-school care. The canton's primary school program requires students to attend for four years. There were 20 students in the municipal primary school program. The obligatory lower secondary school program lasts for six years and there were 12 students in those schools.

As of 2000, there were 48 students from Saint-Saphorin (Lavaux) who attended schools outside the municipality.

== Transportation ==
The municipality has a railway station, St-Saphorin, on the Simplon line. It has regular service to Grandson, Lausanne, and Aigle.

== See also ==
- Glérolles Castle
