= Chexbres =

- Municipality
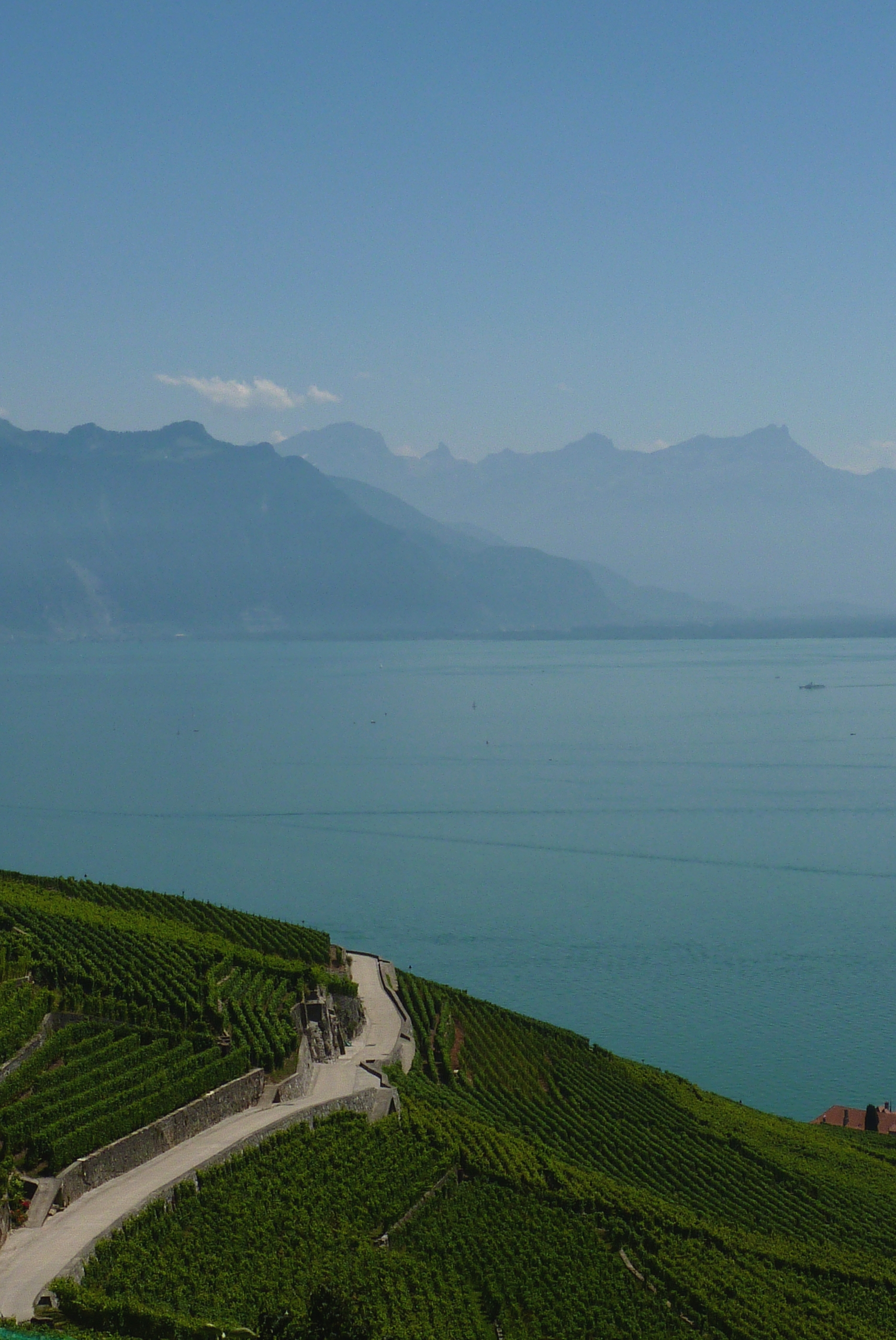

- Flag Coat of arms
- Location of Chexbres
- Location within Switzerland Location within Canton of Vaud
- Coordinates: 46°29′N 6°46′E
- Country: Switzerland
- Canton: Vaud
- District: Lavaux

Government
  - Mayor: Jean-Michel Conne

Area
  - Total: 2.14 km^{2} (0.83 sq mi)
- Elevation: 589 m (1,932 ft)

Population (2000)
  - Total: 2,031
  - Density: 949/km^{2} (2,460/sq mi)
- Demonym: Les Chexbriens
- Time zone: UTC+01:00 (CET)
  - Summer (DST): UTC+02:00 (CEST)
- Postal code: 1071
- SFOS number: 5601
- ISO 3166 code: CH-VD
- Surrounded by: Puidoux, Rivaz, Saint-Saphorin (Lavaux)
- Website: www.chexbres.ch

Chexbres (pronounced [ʃɛbʁ] SHEB-r) is a municipality in the Swiss canton of Vaud, located in the district of Lavaux-Oron. Chexbres is a wine-growing village and enjoys a good selection of local vintages. It also enjoys notable views of Lake Geneva, and therefore is nicknamed "Balcon du Léman" in French.

== History ==
Aerial view from 800 m by Walter Mittelholzer (1919)

The municipality of Chexbres was already inhabited in Roman times, and a single wall remains and coins have been found. The first written mention of the place appeared in 1139 under the name Chexbres. In the ensuing period many other names: Chibriacum (1100), Chabris (1134), Chabre (1142), Cabarissa (1145), Cerbre (1147), Chebra (1165), Chabrii (1179), Chabre (1221), Chaibri (1248), Chaibry (1368), Chebry (1453), Cheibri (1454) and even to 1562, both Chaybres and Cheybres appeared. The origin of the name is not clearly understood. It could be derived from the Roman personal names Cabrius, from the Gallic words Caebre (meaning city on a hill) or from Cabus (hemp).

The area around Chexbres was owned from the 6th century by the abbey of Saint Maurice and in 978 came under the Kingdom of Burgundy. In 1079 King Henry IV gave the village and lands to the bishop of Lausanne.

With the conquest of Vaud by Bern in 1536, Chexbres came under the administration of the Bailiwick of Lausanne. After the collapse of the ancien régime, the village belonged from 1798 to 1803 during the Helvetic Republic to the Canton of Léman, and later the Canton of Vaud. In 1798 the village was assigned to the district of Lavaux and until 1810 was part of the greater community of Saint-Saphorin within this district. It was only after 1810 that it became a politically independent municipality. Thanks to its scenic location, the village developed during the 19th century into a resort.

== Geography ==
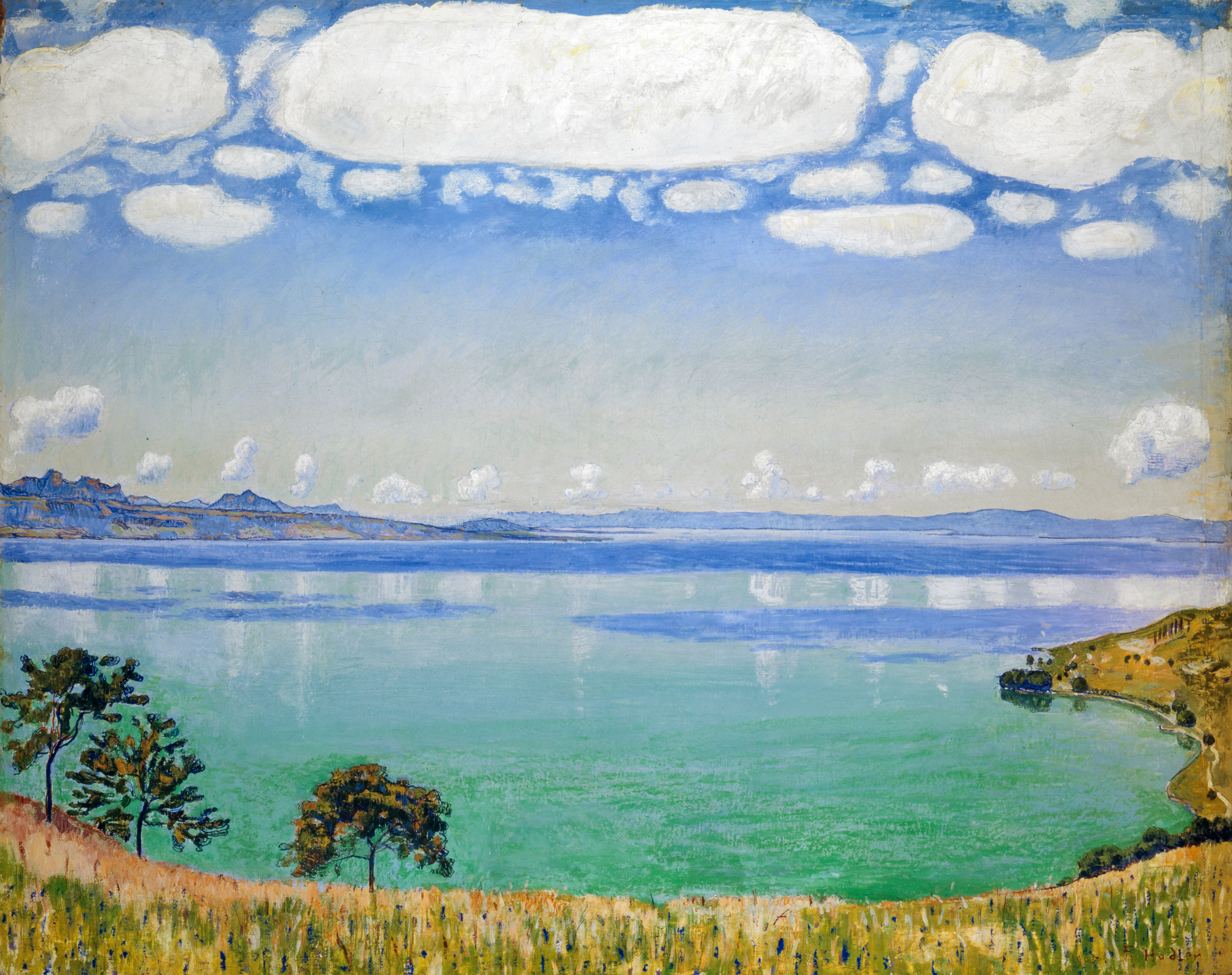
Lake Geneva as seen from Chexbres (Ferdinand Hodler, 1905)

Chexbres is located at 565 m (1,854 ft) above sea level, 12 km (7.5 mi) east-southeast of the capital of the canton of Lausanne (as the crow flies). The village covers an area east of the Forestay river, in Lavaux, a scenic location about 200 m (660 ft) above the lake level of Lake Geneva.

The community itself has no direct lake access, but extends to the east of the Château de Glérolles almost to the shores of Lake Geneva. Crêt Bérard at 715 m (2,346 ft) above sea level is the highest point of Chexbres. To the west, the area extends beyond the valleys of the Forestay on the hill of Le Signal at up to 640 m (2,100 ft) above sea level.

Chexbres includes the hamlet of Le Monte Iller at 455 m (1,493 ft) above sea level on the slope below the village, amid the vineyards and a number of farms. Chexbres is bordered by Rivaz, Puidoux and Saint-Saphorin (Lavaux).

Chexbres has an area, as of 2009, of 2.14 square kilometers (0.83 sq mi). Of this area, 1.1 km^{2} (0.42 sq mi) or 51.4% is used for agricultural purposes, while 0.35 km^{2} (0.14 sq mi) or 16.4% is forested. Of the rest of the land, 0.7 km^{2} (0.27 sq mi) or 32.7% is settled (buildings or roads) and 0.01 km^{2} (2.5 acres) or 0.5% is unproductive land.

Of the built up area, housing and buildings made up 15.9% and transportation infrastructure made up 15.4%. Out of the forested land, 10.7% of the total land area is heavily forested and 5.6% is covered with orchards or small clusters of trees. Of the agricultural land, 9.8% is used for growing crops and 24.8% is pastures, while 16.8% is used for orchards or vine crops.

The municipality was part of the Lavaux District until it was dissolved on 31 August 2006, and Chexbres became part of the new district of Lavaux-Oron.

== Coat of arms ==
The blazon of the municipal coat of arms is Azure, on a cross Or five Roses Gules.

== Demographics ==
Chexbres has a population (as of December 2020) of 2,252. As of 2008, 19.2% of the population are resident foreign nationals. Over the last 10 years (1999–2009) the population has changed at a rate of 4.1%. It has changed at a rate of 12.8% due to migration and at a rate of -8.5% due to births and deaths.

Most of the population (as of 2000) speaks French (1,766 or 86.5%), with German being second most common (109 or 5.3%) and Portuguese being third (36 or 1.8%). There are 34 people who speak Italian.

Of the population in the municipality 424 or about 20.8% were born in Chexbres and lived there in 2000. There were 745 or 36.5% who were born in the same canton, while 383 or 18.8% were born somewhere else in Switzerland, and 400 or 19.6% were born outside of Switzerland.

In 2008 there were 16 live births to Swiss citizens and 1 birth to non-Swiss citizens, and in same time span there were 30 deaths of Swiss citizens and 1 non-Swiss citizen death. Ignoring immigration and emigration, the population of Swiss citizens decreased by 14 while the foreign population remained the same. There was 1 Swiss man who immigrated back to Switzerland and 3 Swiss women who emigrated from Switzerland. At the same time, there were 22 non-Swiss men and 25 non-Swiss women who immigrated from another country to Switzerland. The total Swiss population change in 2008 (from all sources, including moves across municipal borders) was an increase of 46 and the non-Swiss population increased by 27 people. This represents a population growth rate of 3.7%.

The age distribution, as of 2009, in Chexbres is; 199 children or 9.6% of the population are between 0 and 9 years old and 198 teenagers or 9.6% are between 10 and 19. Of the adult population, 203 people or 9.8% of the population are between 20 and 29 years old. 261 people or 12.6% are between 30 and 39, 350 people or 16.9% are between 40 and 49, and 254 people or 12.3% are between 50 and 59. The senior population distribution is 244 people or 11.8% of the population are between 60 and 69 years old, 186 people or 9.0% are between 70 and 79, there are 133 people or 6.4% who are between 80 and 89, and there are 37 people or 1.8% who are 90 and older.

As of 2000, there were 774 people who were single and never married in the municipality. There were 947 married individuals, 184 widows or widowers and 136 individuals who are divorced.

As of 2000, there were 887 private households in the municipality, and an average of 2.1 persons per household. There were 334 households that consist of only one person and 36 households with five or more people. Out of a total of 907 households that answered this question, 36.8% were households made up of just one person. Of the rest of the households, there are 258 married couples without children, 236 married couples with children There were 47 single parents with a child or children. There were 12 households that were made up of unrelated people and 20 households that were made up of some sort of institution or another collective housing.

In 2000 there were 181 single family homes (or 46.5% of the total) out of a total of 389 inhabited buildings. There were 114 multi-family buildings (29.3%), along with 70 multi-purpose buildings that were mostly used for housing (18.0%) and 24 other use buildings (commercial or industrial) that also had some housing (6.2%). Of the single family homes 42 were built before 1919, while 11 were built between 1990 and 2000. The most multi-family homes (46) were built before 1919 and the next most (20) were built between 1961 and 1970. There were 2 multi-family houses built between 1996 and 2000.

In 2000 there were 1,012 apartments in the municipality. The most common apartment size was 3 rooms of which there were 310. There were 74 single room apartments and 223 apartments with five or more rooms. Of these apartments, a total of 846 apartments (83.6% of the total) were permanently occupied, while 141 apartments (13.9%) were seasonally occupied and 25 apartments (2.5%) were empty. As of 2009, the construction rate of new housing units was 1 new units per 1000 residents. The vacancy rate for the municipality, in 2010, was 0.09%.

The historical population is given in the following chart:

== Economy ==
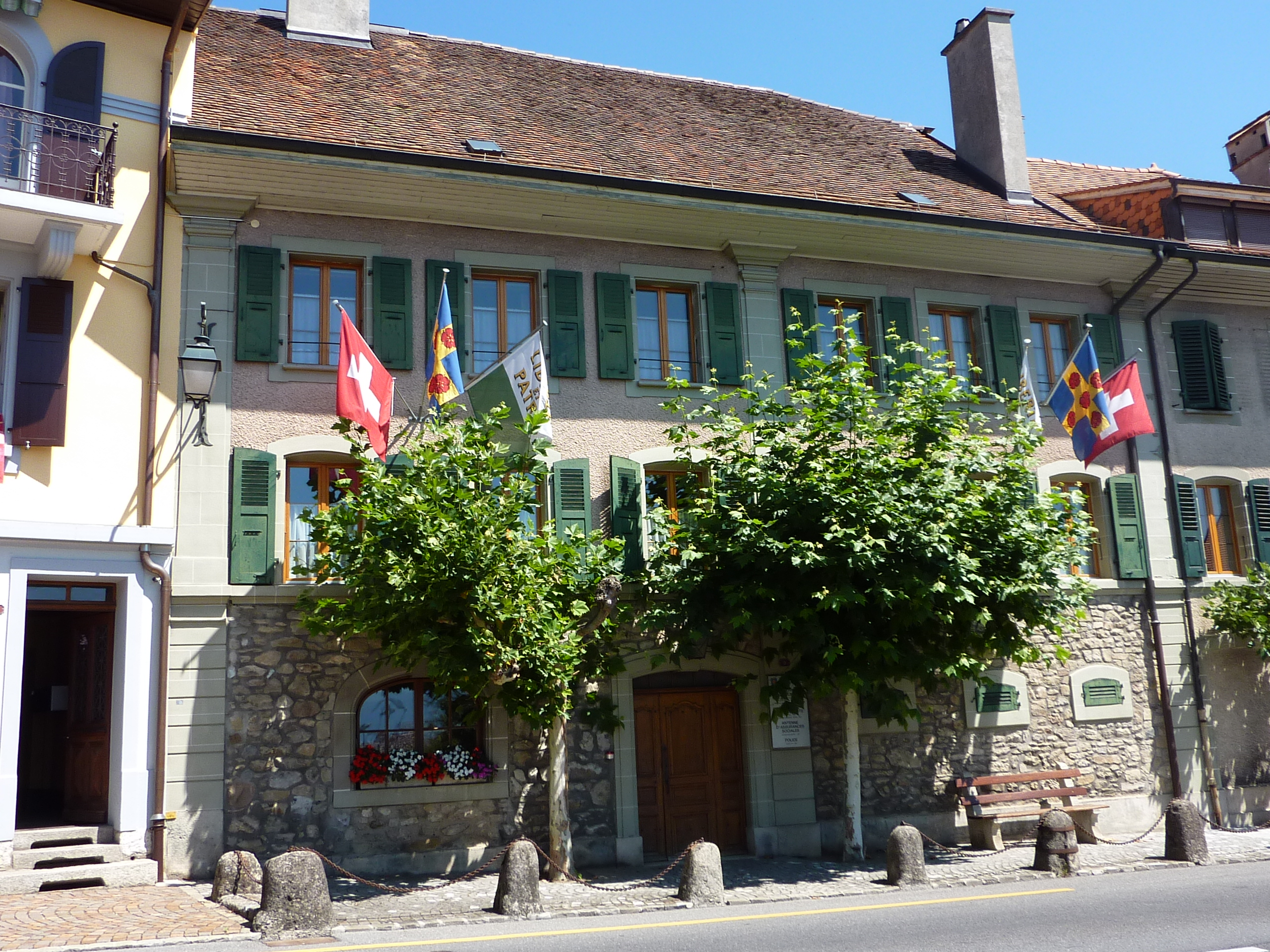
Townhall of Chexbres

Chexbres was until the early 20th century, a primarily agricultural village. Even today, the vineyards in the sunny slopes of the Lavaux cover about 25 hectares and arable and livestock farming in the uplands has a certain role in the employment structure of the population. More jobs however are available in the local small businesses and especially in the service sector. The trade of Chexbres is principally with daily consumer goods and to provide for tourists. There are also several wine shops. Chexbres also features a heated swimming pool. Through the construction of numerous single-family homes in the last decades, the village has developed into a residential community. Many workers though are commuters who work mainly in Lausanne and in the Vevey-Montreux region.

As of 2010, Chexbres had an unemployment rate of 3.8%. As of 2008, there were 38 people employed in the primary economic sector and about 12 businesses involved in this sector. 66 people were employed in the secondary sector and there were 18 businesses in this sector. 534 people were employed in the tertiary sector, with 67 businesses in this sector. There were 958 residents of the municipality who were employed in some capacity, of which females made up 45.1% of the workforce.

In 2008 the total number of full-time equivalent jobs was 521. The number of jobs in the primary sector was 23, all of which were in agriculture. The number of jobs in the secondary sector was 62 of which 19 or (30.6%) were in manufacturing and 42 (67.7%) were in construction. The number of jobs in the tertiary sector was 436. In the tertiary sector; 92 or 21.1% were in wholesale or retail sales or the repair of motor vehicles, 14 or 3.2% were in the movement and storage of goods, 84 or 19.3% were in a hotel or restaurant, 5 or 1.1% were in the information industry, 6 or 1.4% were the insurance or financial industry, 31 or 7.1% were technical professionals or scientists, 13 or 3.0% were in education and 154 or 35.3% were in health care.

In 2000, there were 379 workers who commuted into the municipality and 712 workers who commuted away. The municipality is a net exporter of workers, with about 1.9 workers leaving the municipality for every one entering. Of the working population, 12.8% used public transportation to get to work, and 64.3% used a private car.

== Politics ==
In the 2007 federal election the most popular party was the SVP which received 20.43% of the vote. The next three most popular parties were the FDP (18.1%), the SP (18.05%) and the Green Party (13.3%). In the federal election, a total of 704 votes were cast, and the voter turnout was 52.6%.

== Transport ==
The community has well-developed transport links. It lies on the main road from Vevey to Moudon. The A9 motorway opened in 1974 and connects Lausanne to Sion. It crosses the municipal area, approximately 1 km from the town center.

On 2 May 1904 a railway station was established on the line from Vevey to Puidoux. Today, the route runs on the Train des vignes. Only a little outside the municipal area is the Puidoux-Chexbres station on the main line from Lausanne to Bern (inaugurated on September 4, 1862). A bus service also serves the route from Cully.

== World heritage sites ==
Part of the UNESCO World Heritage Site of Lavaux, Vineyard Terraces is located in Chexbres.

== Landmarks ==
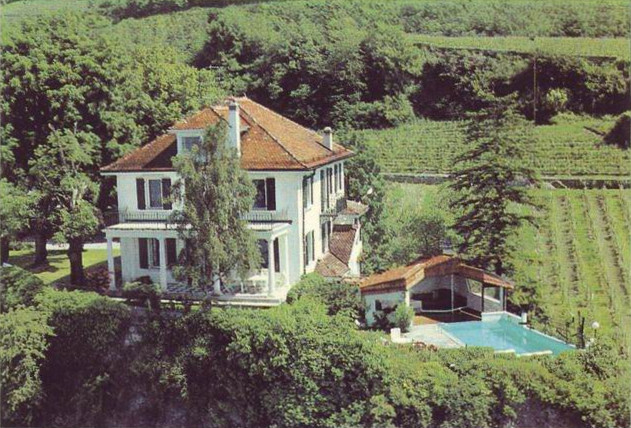
Le Rocher house (Saint-Saphorin municipality)

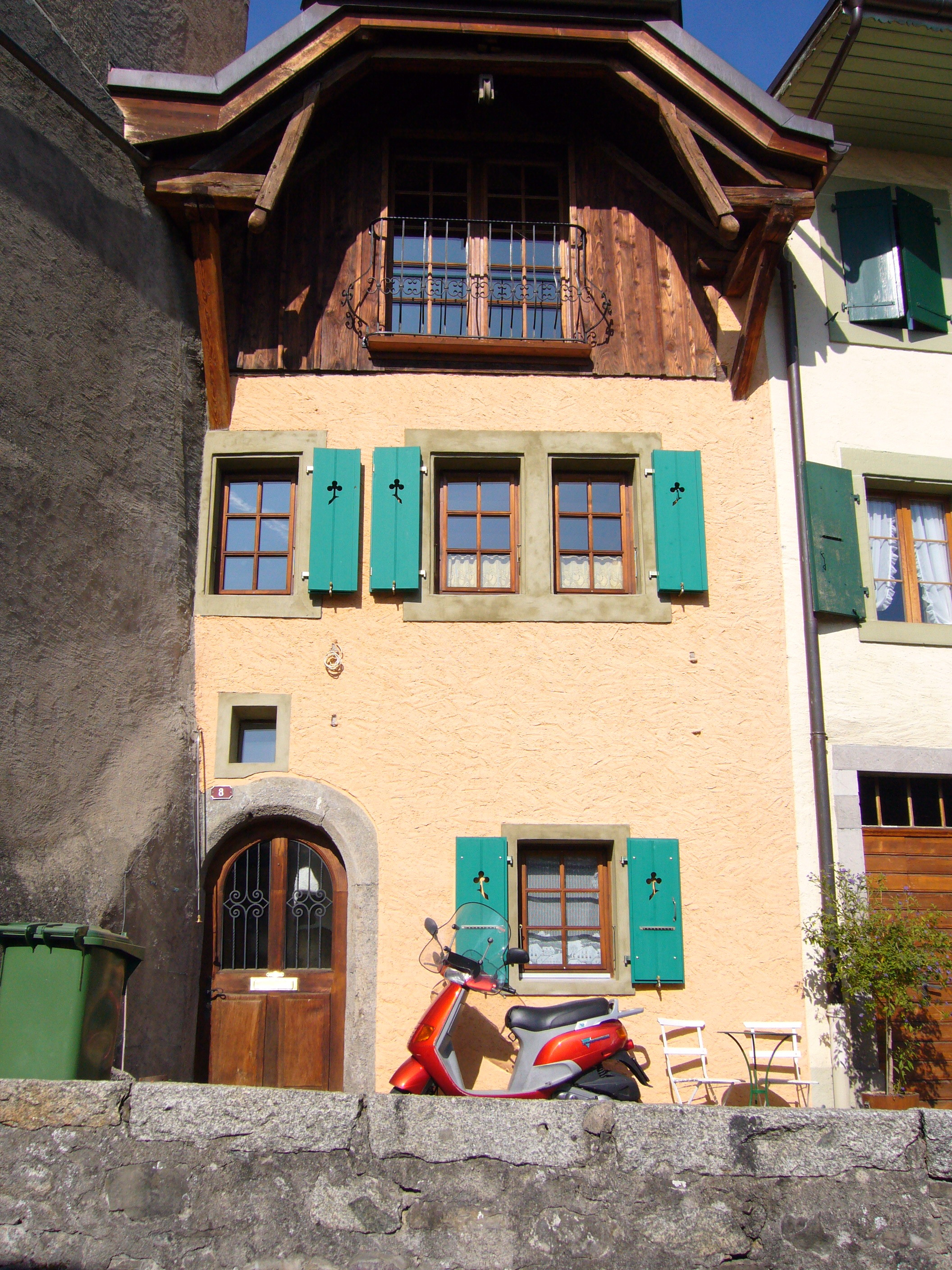
A house in Chexbres

The Church of Chexbres was built in 1888 on the site of a former chapel. It has a neo-Gothic tower, remarkable stained glass by Jean Prahins (1988) and an organ in the French Romanticism style, installed in 1905. The De Crousaz Castle was built in the 15th century. The present building, however, comes from a reconstruction following a fire shortly after 1600. From the 18th century is the townhall, the Maison Wyttenbach. In the old center and some characteristic farmer houses from the 17th to 19th century are preserved.

== Notable people ==
- The Swedish arts patron and collector Theodor Ahrenberg (1912–1989) settled in with his family in 1962 in the villa "Le Rocher" near Chexbres (Saint-Saphorin municipality), where he continued his collecting activities. With numerous young artists who later formed the Classical Modern, Ahrenberg invited them to stay several months of work at his villa. In this way, was created in the next 25 years, a comprehensive collection, known as the Ahrenberg collection .
- Chexbres also gained popularity through numerous landscapes of the Swiss painter Ferdinand Hodler, known for his paintings of the south-facing slopes of the Lavaux and Lake Geneva. The best known of these paintings, "The Lake Geneva from Chexbres", which was created in 1911, is currently in the possession of the famous auction house Christie's in London, England.
- Raymond Abellio lived in Chexbres from 1947 to 1950.
- Madeleine Albright attended a finishing school in Chexbres.

== Religion ==
From the 2000 census, 550 or 26.9% were Roman Catholic, while 1,023 or 50.1% belonged to the Swiss Reformed Church. Of the rest of the population, there were 82 members of an Orthodox church (or about 4.02% of the population), and there were 70 individuals (or about 3.43% of the population) who belonged to another Christian church. There was 1 individual who was Jewish, and 16 (or about 0.78% of the population) who were Islamic. There were 2 individuals who were Buddhist and 4 individuals who belonged to another church. 216 (or about 10.58% of the population) belonged to no church, are agnostic or atheist, and 112 individuals (or about 5.49% of the population) did not answer the question.

== Education ==
In Chexbres about 730 or (35.8%) of the population have completed non-mandatory upper secondary education, and 336 or (16.5%) have completed additional higher education (either university or a Fachhochschule). Of the 336 who completed tertiary schooling, 53.3% were Swiss men, 30.4% were Swiss women, 9.8% were non-Swiss men and 6.5% were non-Swiss women.

In the 2009/2010 school year there were a total of 216 students in the Chexbres school district. In the Vaud cantonal school system, two years of non-obligatory pre-school are provided by the political districts. During the school year, the political district provided pre-school care for a total of 665 children of which 232 children (34.9%) received subsidized pre-school care. The canton's primary school program requires students to attend for four years. There were 114 students in the municipal primary school program. The obligatory lower secondary school program lasts for six years and there were 101 students in those schools. There were also 1 students who were home schooled or attended another non-traditional school.

As of 2000, there were 146 students in Chexbres who came from another municipality, while 177 residents attended schools outside the municipality.
