= St-Saphorin railway station =

Railway station in Saint-Saphorin, Switzerland

St-Saphorin
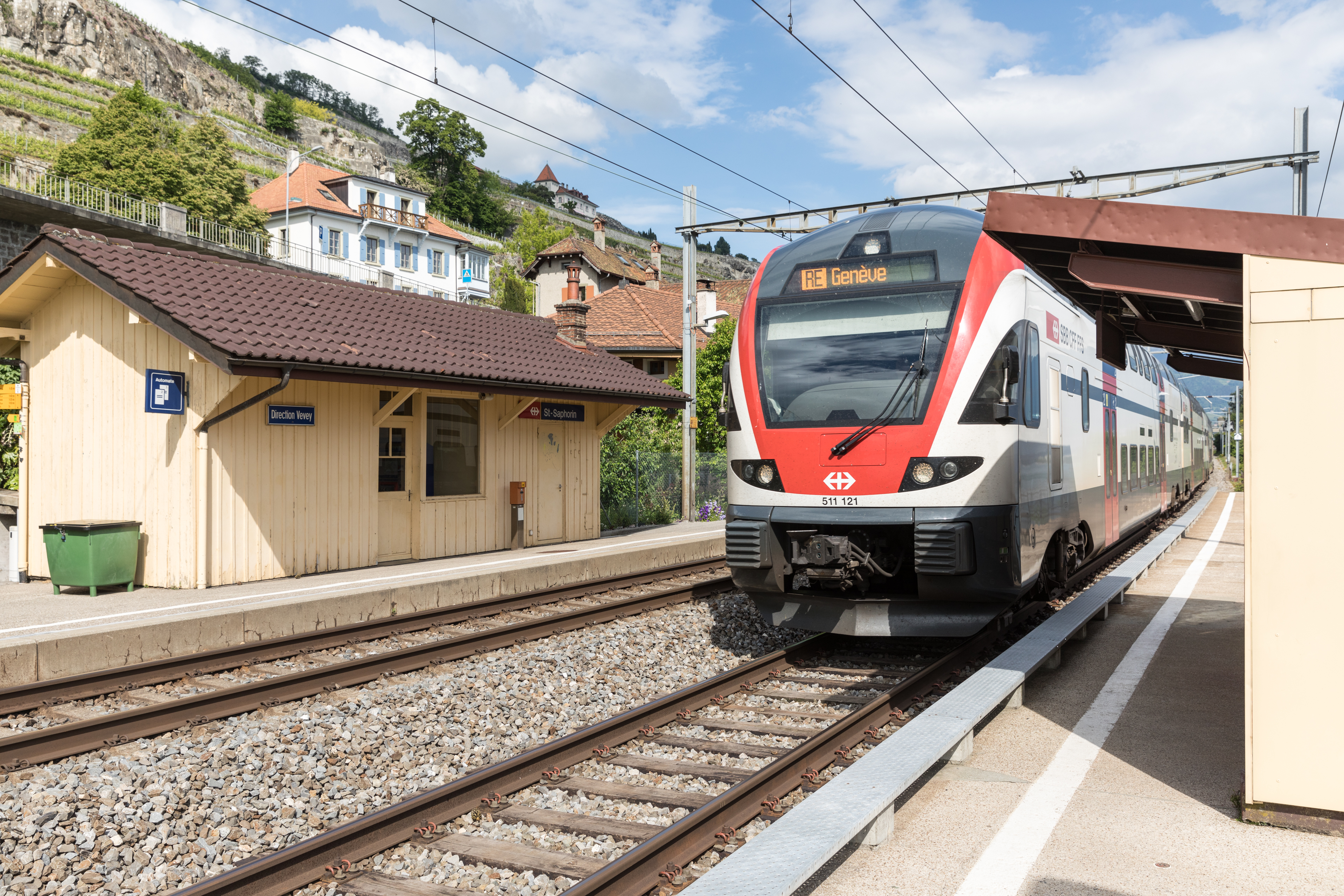
- A RegioExpress at St-Saphorin in 2018

General information
- Location: Saint-Saphorin; Switzerland
- Coordinates: 46°28′21″N 6°47′49″E
- Elevation: 376 m (1,234 ft)
- Owner: Swiss Federal Railways
- Line: Simplon line
- Distance: 14.6 km (9.1 mi) from Lausanne
- Platforms: 2 (2 side platforms)
- Tracks: 2
- Train operators: Swiss Federal Railways

Construction
- Accessible: No

Other information
- Station code: 8501127 (STSA)
- Fare zone: 64 and 71 (mobilis)

Passengers
- 2023: 210 per weekday (SBB)

Services
Preceding station	RER Vaud	Following station
Rivaz towards Le Brassus or Vallorbe	R4	Vevey Terminus
Location

St-Saphorin railway station (French: Gare de Saint-Saphorin) is a railway station in the municipality of Saint-Saphorin, in the Swiss canton of Vaud. It is an intermediate stop on the standard gauge Simplon line of Swiss Federal Railways.

== Services ==
As of the December 2024 timetable change, the following services stop at St-Saphorin:

- RER Vaud R4: hourly service between Le Brassus and Bex; hourly service to Vallorbe on weekdays; limited service from Bex to St-Maurice.
