= Rivaz =

- Municipality
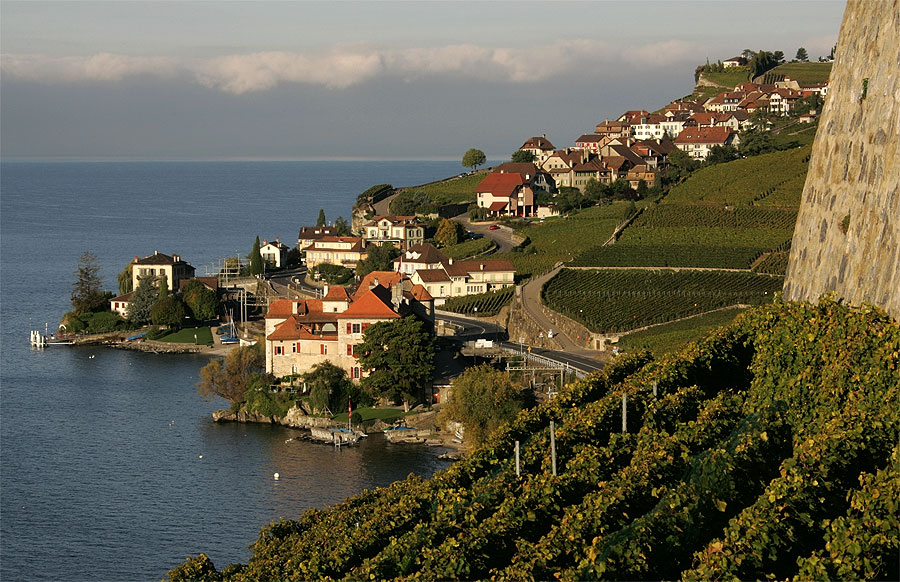
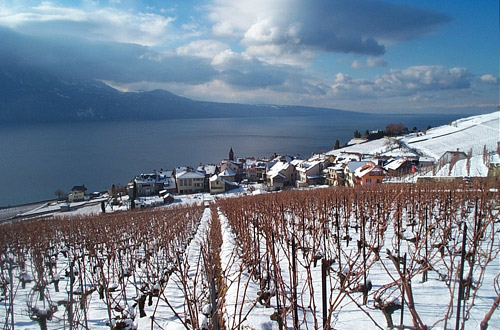

- Flag Coat of arms
- Location of Rivaz
- Location within Switzerland Location within Canton of Vaud
- Coordinates: 46°28′35″N 6°46′43″E
- Country: Switzerland
- Canton: Vaud
- District: Lavaux-Oron

Government
  - Mayor: Syndic

Area
  - Total: 0.31 km^{2} (0.12 sq mi)
- Elevation: 440 m (1,440 ft)

Population (January 2004)
  - Total: 329
  - Density: 1,100/km^{2} (2,700/sq mi)
- Time zone: UTC+01:00 (CET)
  - Summer (DST): UTC+02:00 (CEST)
- Postal code: 1071
- SFOS number: 5609
- ISO 3166 code: CH-VD
- Surrounded by: Chexbres, Meillerie (FR-74), Puidoux, Saint-Gingolph (FR-74), Saint-Saphorin (Lavaux)
- Website: www.rivaz.ch

Rivaz (French pronunciation: [ʁiva]) is a municipality in the canton of Vaud in Switzerland, located in the district of Lavaux-Oron.

== History ==
Rivaz is first mentioned in 1138 as Ripa.

== Geography ==
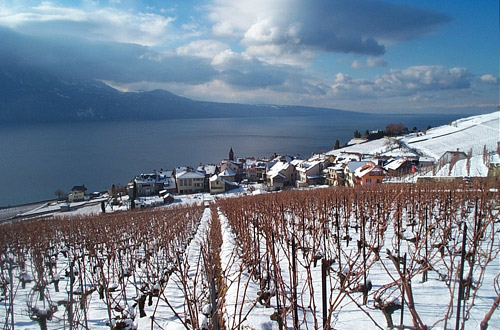
Rivaz with vineyards and Lake Geneva

Aerial view (1964)

Rivaz has an area, as of 2009, of 0.31 square kilometres (0.12 mi^{2}). Of this area, 0.21 km^{2} (0.081 mi^{2}) or 67.7% is used for agricultural purposes, while 0 km^{2} (0 mi^{2}) or 0.0% is forested. Of the rest of the land, 0.07 km^{2} (17 acres) or 22.6% is settled (buildings or roads), 0.02 km^{2} (4.9 acres) or 6.5% is either rivers or lakes.

Of the built up area, housing and buildings made up 9.7% and transportation infrastructure made up 12.9%. Out of the forested land, all of the forested land area is covered with heavy forests. Of the agricultural land, 0.0% is used for growing crops, while 67.7% is used for orchards or vine crops. Of the water in the municipality, 3.2% is in lakes and 3.2% is in rivers and streams.

The municipality was part of the Lavaux District until it was dissolved on 31 August 2006, and Rivaz became part of the new district of Lavaux-Oron.

The municipality along Lake Geneva is the smallest in the Canton of Vaud. It consists of the village of Rivaz and the hamlet of Sallaz.

== Coat of arms ==
The blazon of the municipal coat of arms is Per fess wavy Or and Azure.

== Demographics ==
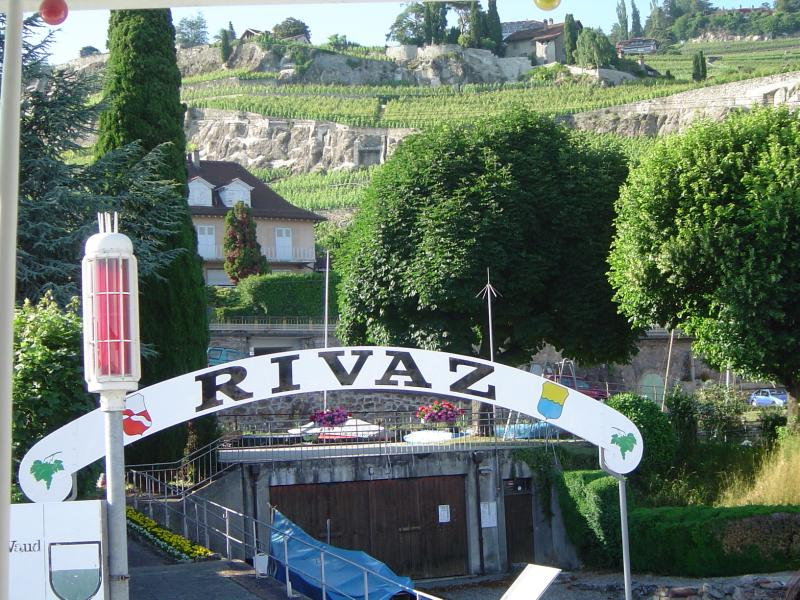
A tour boat dock at Rivaz

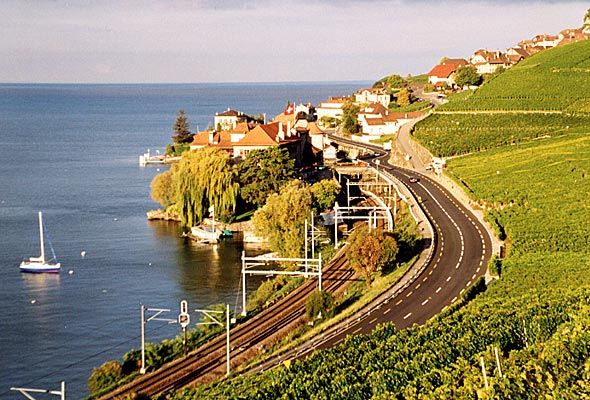
Rivaz village with train tracks and road

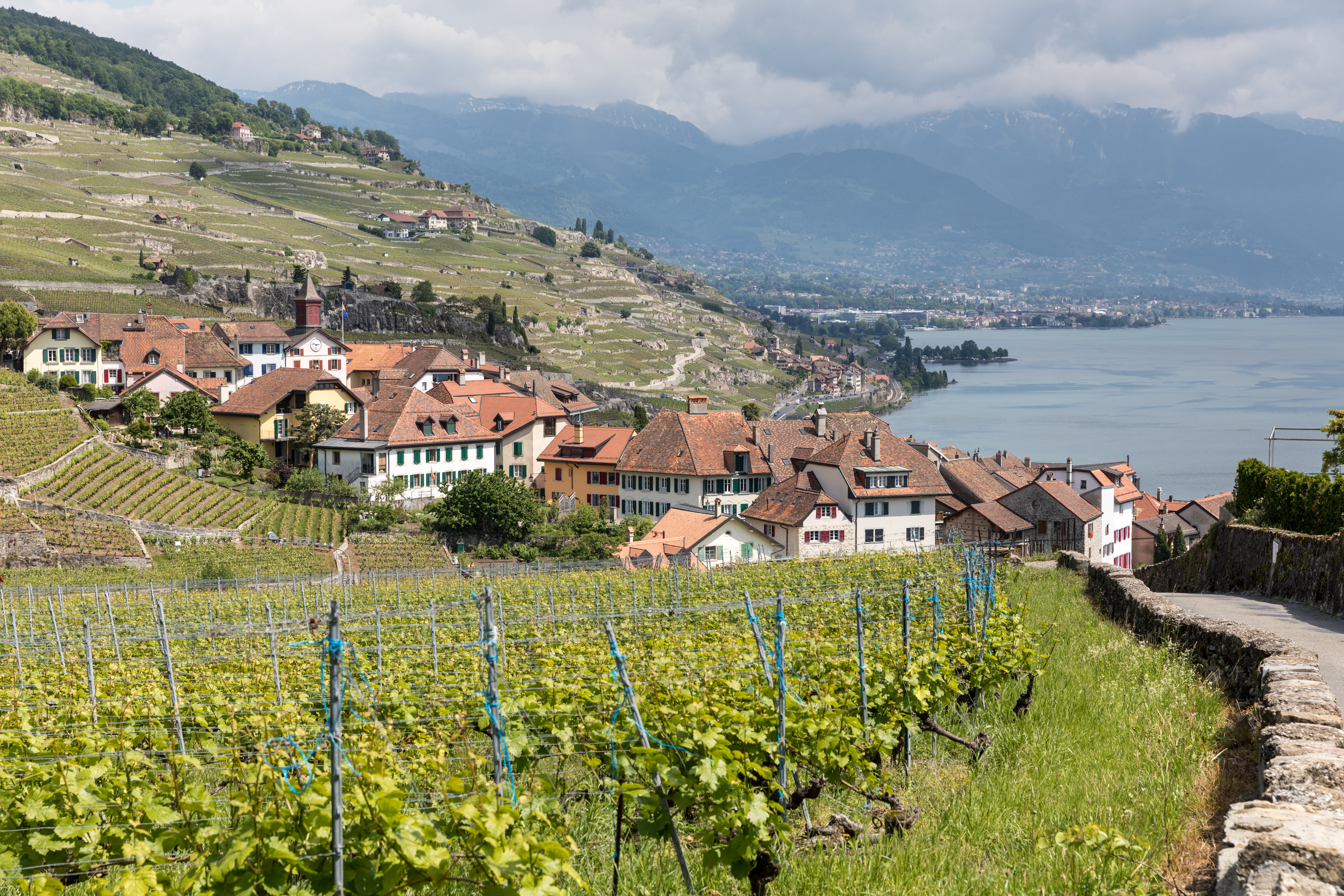
View to Rivaz VD from west

Rivaz has a population (as of December 2020) of 337. As of 2008, 17.9% of the population are resident foreign nationals. Over the last 10 years (1999–2009 ) the population has changed at a rate of 7.9%. It has changed at a rate of 0.9% due to migration and at a rate of 8.2% due to births and deaths.

Most of the population (as of 2000) speaks French (265 or 83.6%), with German being second most common (18 or 5.7%) and Portuguese being third (13 or 4.1%). There are 10 people who speak Italian.

Of the population in the municipality 104 or about 32.8% were born in Rivaz and lived there in 2000. There were 108 or 34.1% who were born in the same canton, while 45 or 14.2% were born somewhere else in Switzerland, and 51 or 16.1% were born outside of Switzerland.

In 2008 there were 2 live births to Swiss citizens and were 2 deaths of Swiss citizens. Ignoring immigration and emigration, the population of Swiss citizens remained the same while the foreign population remained the same. There was 1 Swiss woman who emigrated from Switzerland. At the same time, there were 2 non-Swiss men who immigrated from another country to Switzerland. The total Swiss population change in 2008 (from all sources, including moves across municipal borders) was a decrease of 5 and the non-Swiss population remained the same. This represents a population growth rate of -1.4%.

The age distribution, as of 2009, in Rivaz is; 40 children or 11.3% of the population are between 0 and 9 years old and 43 teenagers or 12.2% are between 10 and 19. Of the adult population, 28 people or 7.9% of the population are between 20 and 29 years old. 55 people or 15.6% are between 30 and 39, 61 people or 17.3% are between 40 and 49, and 40 people or 11.3% are between 50 and 59. The senior population distribution is 39 people or 11.0% of the population are between 60 and 69 years old, 32 people or 9.1% are between 70 and 79, there are 14 people or 4.0% who are between 80 and 89, and there is 1 person who is 90 and older.

As of 2000, there were 126 people who were single and never married in the municipality. There were 161 married individuals, 15 widows or widowers and 15 individuals who are divorced.

As of 2000, there were 142 private households in the municipality, and an average of 2.1 persons per household. There were 54 households that consist of only one person and 7 households with five or more people. Out of a total of 148 households that answered this question, 36.5% were households made up of just one person and there were 2 adults who lived with their parents. Of the rest of the households, there are 38 married couples without children, 41 married couples with children There were 5 single parents with a child or children. There were 2 households that were made up of unrelated people and 6 households that were made up of some sort of institution or another collective housing.

In 2000 there were 33 single family homes (or 36.3% of the total) out of a total of 91 inhabited buildings. There were 27 multi-family buildings (29.7%), along with 22 multi-purpose buildings that were mostly used for housing (24.2%) and 9 other use buildings (commercial or industrial) that also had some housing (9.9%). Of the single family homes 22 were built before 1919. The most multi-family homes (22) were built before 1919 and the next most (2) were built between 1971 and 1980.

In 2000 there were 166 apartments in the municipality. The most common apartment size was 3 rooms of which there were 48. There were 7 single room apartments and 44 apartments with five or more rooms. Of these apartments, a total of 135 apartments (81.3% of the total) were permanently occupied, while 22 apartments (13.3%) were seasonally occupied and 9 apartments (5.4%) were empty. As of 2009, the construction rate of new housing units was 0 new units per 1000 residents. The vacancy rate for the municipality, in 2010, was 0%.

The historical population is given in the following chart:

== Heritage sites of national significance ==
The municipality is part of the UNESCO World Heritage Site: Lavaux, Vineyard Terraces which is also listed as a Swiss heritage site of national significance. The entire village of Rivaz is part of the Inventory of Swiss Heritage Sites.

== Politics ==
In the 2007 federal election the most popular party was the FDP which received 22.75% of the vote. The next three most popular parties were the SP (20.08%), the SVP (17.52%) and the Green Party (17.05%). In the federal election, a total of 144 votes were cast, and the voter turnout was 62.3%.

== Economy ==
As of 2010, Rivaz had an unemployment rate of 0.9%. As of 2008, there were 61 people employed in the primary economic sector and about 17 businesses involved in this sector. 7 people were employed in the secondary sector and there were 4 businesses in this sector. 56 people were employed in the tertiary sector, with 8 businesses in this sector. There were 169 residents of the municipality who were employed in some capacity, of which females made up 44.4% of the workforce.

In 2008 the total number of full-time equivalent jobs was 98. The number of jobs in the primary sector was 41, all of which were in agriculture. The number of jobs in the secondary sector was 7 of which 6 or (85.7%) were in manufacturing and 1 was in construction. The number of jobs in the tertiary sector was 50. In the tertiary sector; 2 or 4.0% were in wholesale or retail sales or the repair of motor vehicles, 15 or 30.0% were in a hotel or restaurant, 30 or 60.0% were in the information industry, 2 or 4.0% were technical professionals or scientists, 1 was in education.

In 2000, there were 38 workers who commuted into the municipality and 108 workers who commuted away. The municipality is a net exporter of workers, with about 2.8 workers leaving the municipality for every one entering. Of the working population, 12.4% used public transportation to get to work, and 62.7% used a private car.

== Religion ==
From the 2000 census, 80 or 25.2% were Roman Catholic, while 186 or 58.7% belonged to the Swiss Reformed Church. Of the rest of the population, there was 1 member of an Orthodox church, there was 1 individual who belongs to the Christian Catholic Church, and there were 2 individuals (or about 0.63% of the population) who belonged to another Christian church. There was 1 individual who was Islamic. There were 1 individual who belonged to another church. 34 (or about 10.73% of the population) belonged to no church, are agnostic or atheist, and 11 individuals (or about 3.47% of the population) did not answer the question.

== Education ==
In Rivaz about 119 or (37.5%) of the population have completed non-mandatory upper secondary education, and 72 or (22.7%) have completed additional higher education (either university or a Fachhochschule). Of the 72 who completed tertiary schooling, 54.2% were Swiss men, 31.9% were Swiss women, 6.9% were non-Swiss men and 6.9% were non-Swiss women.

In the 2009/2010 school year there were a total of 52 students in the Rivaz school district. In the Vaud cantonal school system, two years of non-obligatory pre-school are provided by the political districts. During the school year, the political district provided pre-school care for a total of 665 children of which 232 children (34.9%) received subsidized pre-school care. The canton's primary school program requires students to attend for four years. There were 34 students in the municipal primary school program. The obligatory lower secondary school program lasts for six years and there were 18 students in those schools.

As of 2000, there were 9 students in Rivaz who came from another municipality, while 39 residents attended schools outside the municipality.
