= Tauredunum event =

Ancient Tsunami on Lake Geneva

Coordinates: 46°21′27″N 6°51′7″E

The Tauredunum event (German: Tauredunum-Ereignis) of 563 AD was a tsunami on Lake Geneva (then under the Frankish territory of the Kingdom of Orleans), triggered by a massive landslide which caused widespread devastation and loss of life along the lakeshore. According to two contemporary chroniclers, the disaster was caused by the collapse of a mountainside at a place called Tauredunum at the eastern end of Lake Geneva. It caused a great wave to sweep the length of the lake, sweeping away villages on the shoreline and striking the city of Geneva with such force that it washed over the city walls and killed many of the inhabitants.

A study published in October 2012 suggests that the Tauredunum landslide triggered the collapse of sediments that had accumulated at the point where the River Rhône flows into Lake Geneva. This caused a huge underwater mudslide that displaced several hundred million cubic metres of sediment, producing a tsunami up to 16 metres (52 ft) high that reached Geneva within about 70 minutes. There is evidence of four previous mudslides, suggesting that tsunamis may be a recurrent phenomenon on Lake Geneva. It is also speculated that such an event could happen again, with far more severe consequences as more people live within potentially affected areas, and because most people are not accustomed to the idea of tsunamis happening in landlocked bodies of water and are thus unaware of the danger.

== Historical accounts ==
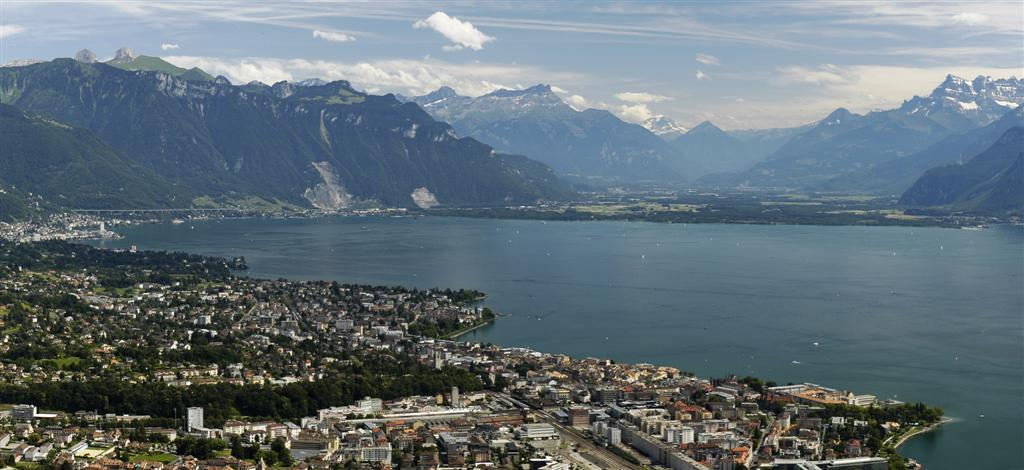
The probable site of the Tauredunum landslide is visible on the far right of this picture

The event was recorded in some detail by Gregory of Tours in his History of the Franks. He wrote:

A great prodigy appeared in Gaul at the fortress of Tauredunum, which was situated on high ground above the River Rhône. Here a curious bellowing sound was heard for more than sixty days: then the whole hillside was split open and separated from the mountain nearest to it, and it fell into the river, carrying with it men, churches, property and houses. The banks of the river were blocked and the water flowed backwards. This place was shut in by mountains on both sides, for the stream flows there through narrow defiles. The water then flooded the higher reaches and submerged and carried everything which was on its banks. A second time the inhabitants were taken unawares, and as the accumulated water forced its way through again it drowned those who lived there, just as it had done higher up, destroying their houses, killing their cattle, and carrying away and overwhelming with its violent and unexpected inundation everything which stood on its banks as far as the city of Geneva. It is told by many that the mass of water was so great that it went over the walls into the city mentioned. And there is no doubt of this tale because as we have said the Rhone flows in that region between mountains that hem it in closely, and being so closely shut in, it has no place to turn aside. It carried away the fragments of the mountain that had fallen and thus caused it to disappear wholly.

Marius of Avenches also described the event in his Chronicle:

[T]he great mountain of Tauretunum, in the territory of the Valais, fell so suddenly that it covered a castle in its neighbourhood, and some villages with their inhabitants; it so agitated the lake for 60 miles in length and 20 in breadth that it overflowed both its banks; it destroyed very ancient villages, with men and cattle; it entombed several holy places, with the religious belonging to them. It swept away with fury the Bridge of Geneva, the mills and the men; and, flowing into the city of Geneva, caused the loss of several lives.

== Tauredunum's location and tsunami-avalanche risks in the Alps ==
The location of Tauredunum has long been debated. Among other alternatives, it has been suggested that it was situated near the Bois Noir at Saint-Maurice or at the foot of the Pic du Blanchard near Saint-Gingolph. The landslide is now thought to have occurred on the mountain of Le Grammont, near Les Evouettes at the point where the Rhône empties into Lake Geneva. Such collapses, known as an éboulement or Bergfall, are not uncommon in the Alps; in October 1963, the collapse of the side of Monte Toc in Italy caused 260 million cubic metres (9.2×10^{9} cu ft) of debris to fall into the lake behind the Vajont Dam, sending a wave of water into the valley that killed up to 2,500 people. Mountainside collapses have caused similar though smaller lake tsunamis in at least three lakes in Switzerland – Lake Lucerne, Lake Lauerz and Lake Brienz. The danger is recognised by Switzerland's Federal Office for Civil Protection, which takes the risk of landslide-caused tsunamis into account in its disaster planning. Certain mountains, such as the Rigi and the Bürgenstock, present more of a risk. It is not uncommon for large boulders to fall off the Bürgenstock into Lake Lucerne, though this presents little risk of a tsunami because of the relatively low amount of energy released in such falls.

== Proposed mechanism for tsunami of 563 ==
A study by a team from the University of Geneva, led by Stéphanie Girardclos and Guy Simpson, has found that the tsunami of 563 may not have been directly caused by the landslide, but by the collapse of sediments on the lake bed. The team found a giant fan of turbidite – a mixture of sand and mud deposited by a rapid flow of water – spread across the lake bed. The fan extends in a north-west direction from the Rhône's mouth, where the river's flow has carved a series of canyon-like underwater channels. The deposit is huge, extending over a length of 10 kilometres (6.2 mi) and a width of 5 kilometres (3.1 mi), with an average depth of 5 metres (16 ft) and a volume of at least 250 million m³ (8.8 billion ft³). Biological material found in the turbidite enabled it to be dated to between 381 and 612, consistent with the date of the Tauredunum event.

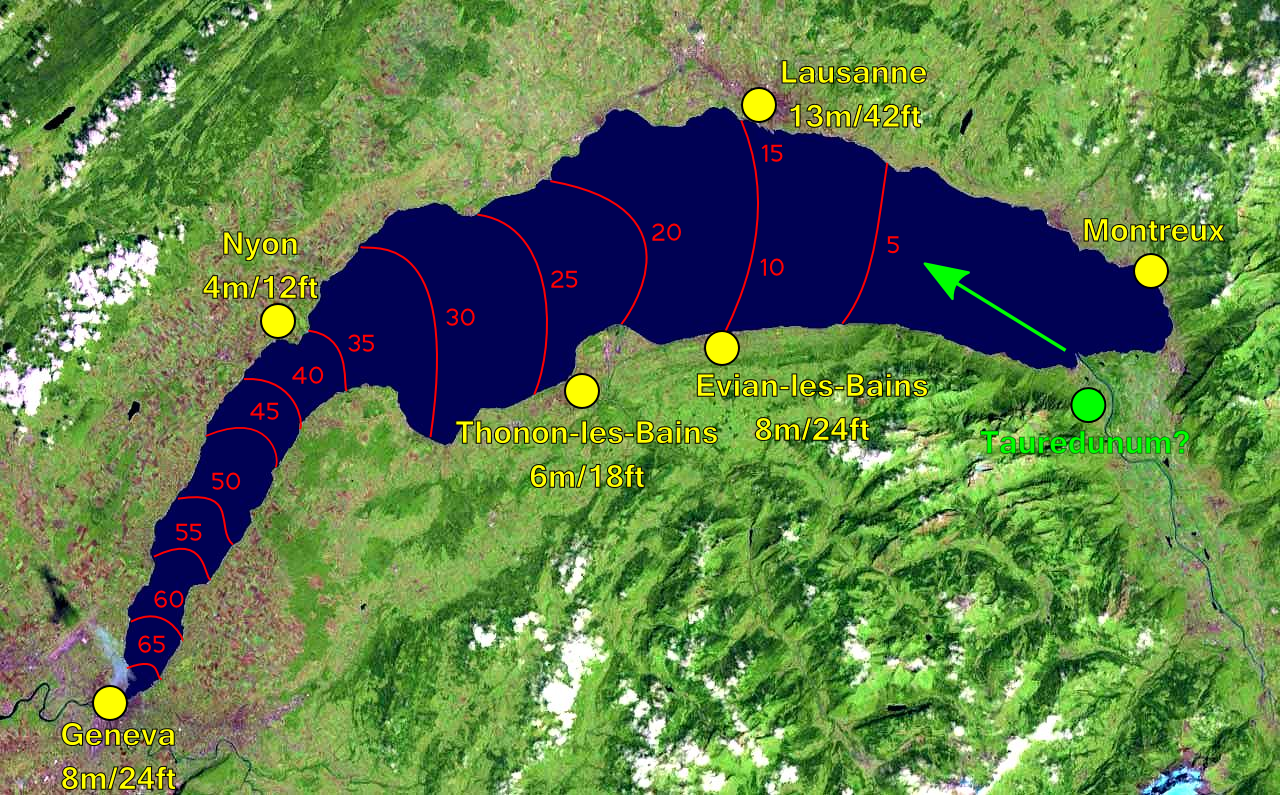
Times of wave propagation (in minutes) and spot heights of the tsunami at key locations during the Tauredunum event

It is hypothesised that the impact of the Tauredunum landslide destabilised sedimentary deposits at the mouth of the Rhône, causing their collapse and triggering a large tsunami. According to computer simulations, a wave up to 16 metres (52 ft) high would have been created by the collapse and would have travelled the full length of the lake within 70 minutes of the event. It would have struck Lausanne within only 15 minutes, where it would have been about 13 metres (43 ft) high, though the damage there would have been limited as the city stands on a steeply sloping shoreline. Much greater damage would have been caused at Geneva, where the wave would have been about 8 metres (26 ft). A wave this high would certainly have been capable of causing the destruction described by the chroniclers. Other towns along the lakeside would also have been hit by the wave, which would have been about 8 metres (26 ft) high at Évian-les-Bains, 6 metres (20 ft) high at Thonon-les-Bains and 4 metres (13 ft) high at Nyon. It would have travelled at about 70 kilometres per hour (43 mph), giving those on the shoreline little time to flee.

The team also found evidence of four older layers of turbidite, suggesting that such collapses have been a recurrent event since Lake Geneva formed at the end of the last ice age some 19,000 years ago. It is not yet known how frequently they have occurred – further investigation will be required to answer this question – but researcher Guy Simpson says, "It's certainly happened before and I think that we can expect that it will probably happen again sometime." Although most people's focus has been on marine tsunamis such as the 2004 Indian Ocean tsunami and the March 2011 tsunami in Japan, lakeside cities such as Geneva, 275 kilometres (171 mi) from the sea, are also at risk. Katrina Kremer notes that the risk of a fresh tsunami still exists, not just in Lake Geneva, but in other mountain lakes as well: "We have recognised that a tsunami risk applies to all lakes that have unstable slopes along the shore." However, she warns, "the risk is underestimated because most people just do not know that tsunamis can happen in lakes." The risk is particularly pronounced for the city of Geneva, given its position on low ground at the funnel-shaped end of the lake, which magnifies the effects of a tsunami. The impact of a new tsunami on the whole of Lake Geneva would be far more severe now than in 563, as over a million people now live along the lake's shores.

== See also ==
- Seiche
