= Marius Aventicensis =

Marius Aventicensis or, popularly, Marius of Avenches (532 – 31 December 596) was the Bishop of Aventicum (modern Avenches) from 574, remembered for his terse chronicle. After his death in Lausanne, he was venerated in that city as a saint, and his feast day was celebrated on 9 or 12 February.

== Life ==
What is known of him, aside from his chronicle, is from the inscription on his tomb in the church of Saint Thyrsus in Lausanne. He was born in the neighbourhood of Autun probably in 530, to a distinguished, rich family, probably Gallo-Roman. In 574 he was made Bishop of Aventicum, took part in the Second Council of Mâcon in 585, and shortly afterwards transferred his episcopal see from Aventicum, which was rapidly declining, to Lausanne.

He is extolled as an ideal bishop; as a skilled goldsmith who made the sacred liturgical vessels with his own hands; as a protector and benefactor of the poor who ploughed his own land; as a man of prayer, and as a scholar. In 587 he consecrated a proprietary church built at his expense on property of his own at Paterniacum (Payerne). The church of Saint Thyrsus was rededicated at an early date to Saint Marius.

== Chronicle writer ==
His brief chronicle is a continuation of the Chronicon imperiale usually said to be the chronicle of Prosper of Aquitaine. Considering himself a Roman, Marius dated the years by the consuls and the emperors of the Eastern Roman Empire. It covers the years from 455 to 581, and is a valuable source for Burgundian and Franconian history, especially for the second half of the 6th century, "and serves to correct the bias of Gregory of Tours against the Arians of Burgundy" Marius is the first to use the term variola (smallpox) to describe an epidemic that afflicted Gaul and Italy in 570.

The chronicle has been frequently published: first by Pierre-François Chifflet in André Duchesne's Historiæ Francorum Scriptores, I (1636), 210–214; again by Migne in Patrologia Latina, LXXII, 793–802; in Monumenta Germaniae Historica, Auctores antiqui, XI (1893), 232–9 with an introduction by Theodor Mommsen; and by Justin Favrod with a French translation, La chronique de Marius d'Avenches (455–581) (Lausanne 1991).
