= Lavaux =

UNESCO World Heritage Site
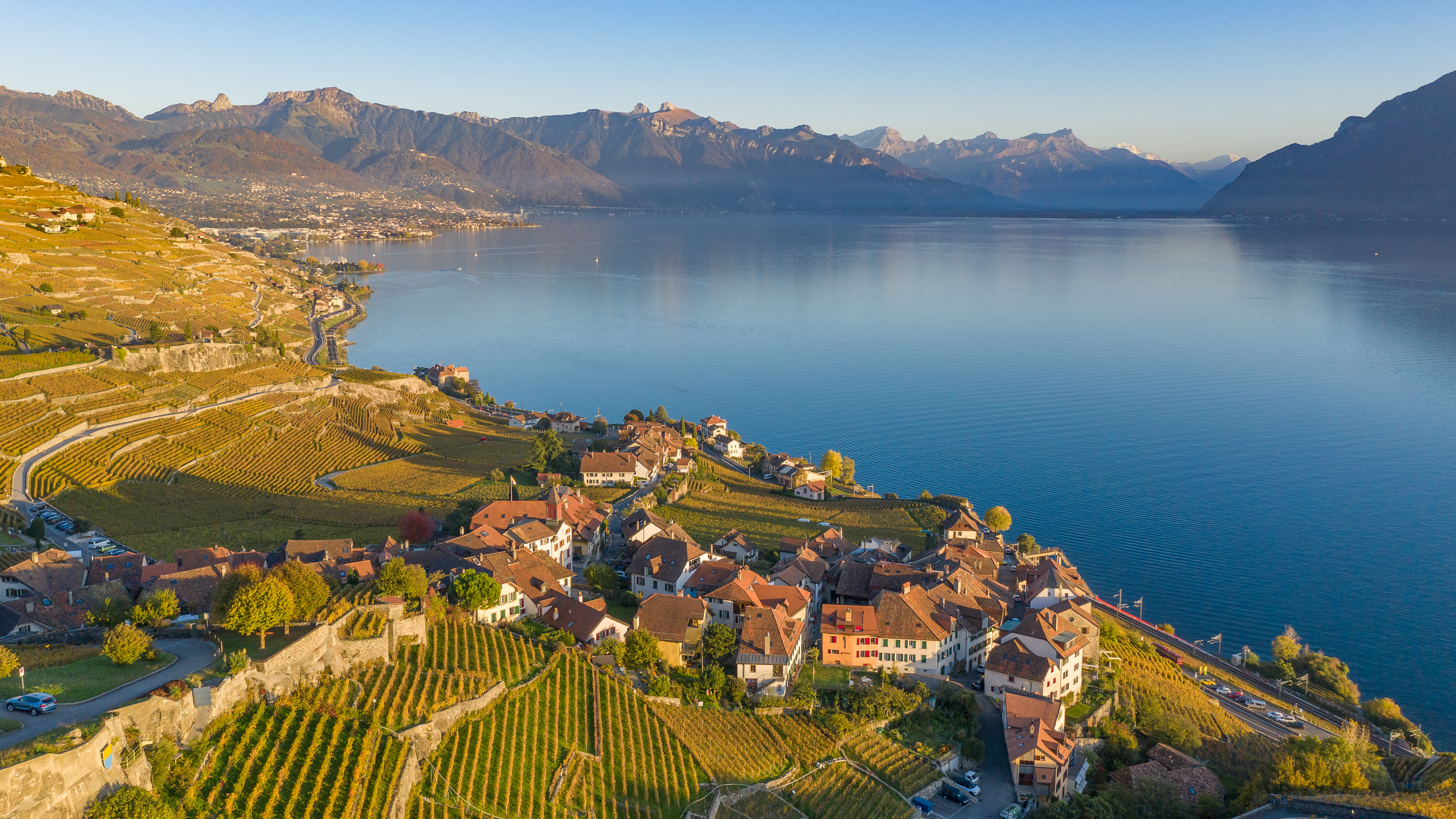

- Location within Switzerland
- Official name: Lavaux, Vineyard Terraces
- Location: Canton of Vaud, Switzerland
- Criteria: Cultural: (iii), (iv), (v)
- Reference: 1243
- Inscription: 2007 (31st Session)
- Area: 898 ha (2,220 acres)
- Buffer zone: 1,408 ha (3,480 acres)
- Website: www.lavaux.ch
- Coordinates: 46°29′31″N 06°44′46″E

Lavaux (French pronunciation: [lavo]) is a region in the canton of Vaud in Switzerland, in the district of Lavaux-Oron. Lavaux consists of 830 hectares (2,100 acres) of terraced vineyards that stretch for about 30 kilometres (19 mi) along the south-facing northern shores of Lake Geneva. The region is designated a UNESCO World Heritage Site with the formal name Lavaux, Vineyard Terraces.

The terraced vineyards in the area date back to the 11th century, under the rule of Benedictine and Cistercian monasteries. The main wine grape variety grown here is the Chasselas.

== Description ==
Lavaux is a region of terraced vineyards in the Canton of Vaud, Switzerland, stretching for around 30 km (19 mi) along the northern shore of Lake Geneva. Since July 2007, it has been designated a UNESCO World Heritage Site with the formal name Lavaux, Vineyard Terraces.

Since 2016, the vineyards of Lavaux are no longer treated with synthetic pesticides.

== Hiking trail ==
There are many hikes possible through the vineyards of Lavaux. There is a hiking trail (Terrasses de Lavaux), going from Saint-Saphorin to Lutry, recommended by the Tourism Office of Switzerland.

== Legal protection ==
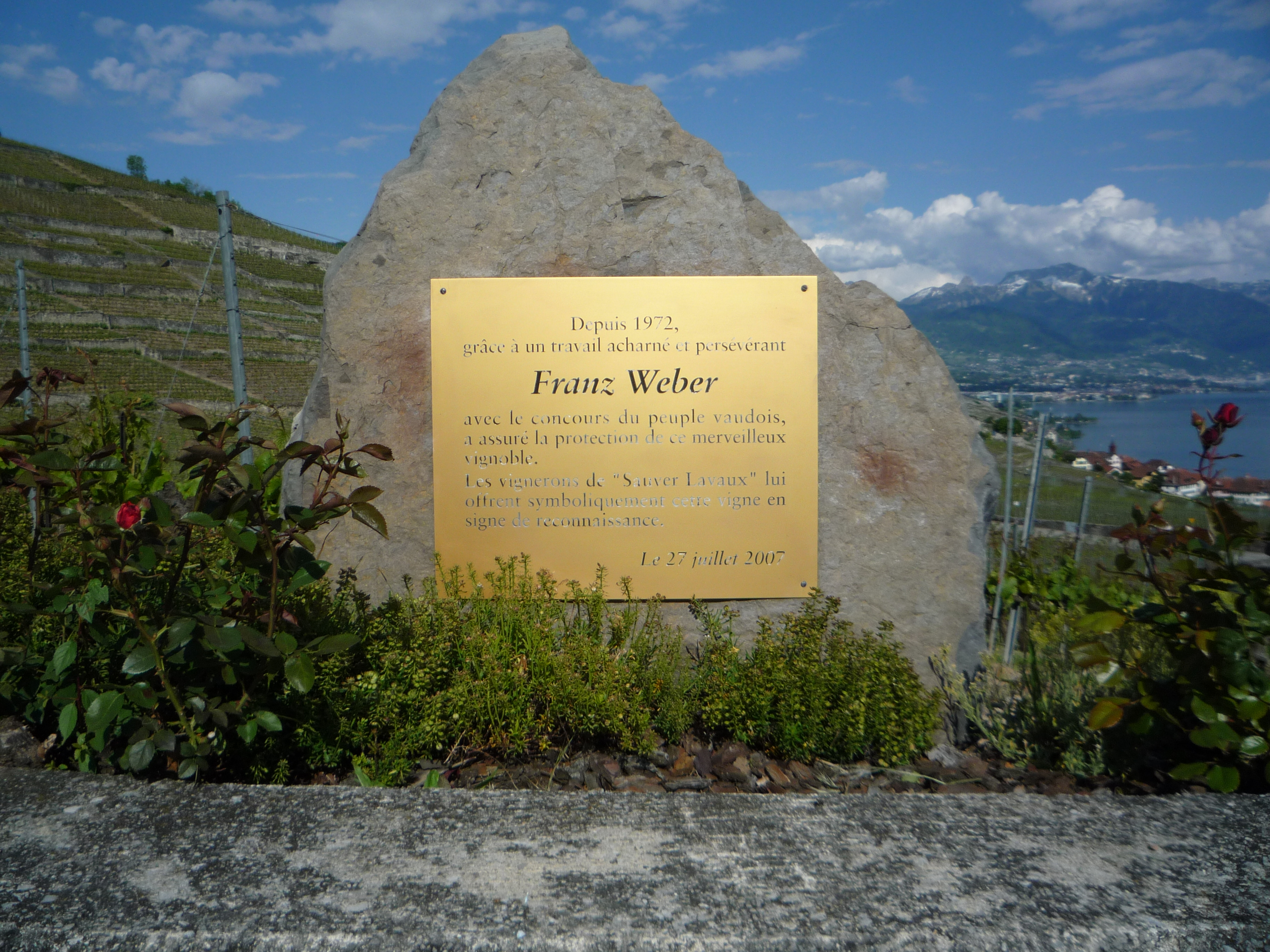
Commemorative plaque honouring the commitment of Franz Weber for the protection of Lavaux.

Under cantonal law, the vineyards of Lavaux are protected from development. The movement to effect this began in 1977, when the voters of the Canton of Vaud accepted (55%) the cantonal popular initiative "Save Lavaux" Consequently, in 1979, a law was made to protect Lavaux (Loi sur le plan de protection de Lavaux).

In 2003, the new constitution of the Canton of Vaud came into force but did not contain the article about the protection of Lavaux. A second popular initiative "Save Lavaux" was launched to re-introduce it and was accepted in 2005 by 81% of voters.

In 2009, Franz Weber launched a third initiative "Save Lavaux" to reduce the opportunities for new construction in Lavaux, which was rejected on 19 May 2014 by 68% of voters. The regional government's (Council of State of Vaud) counter-initiative was accepted by 68% of voters (strengthening the protection but less strictly than Franz Weber's initiative would have).

== Influences and tributes ==
- Lavaux is the name of a song by Prince, on his album 20Ten (2010).
- In 2011, the Swiss Post issued three special stamps celebrating the region of Lavaux.

== Gallery ==
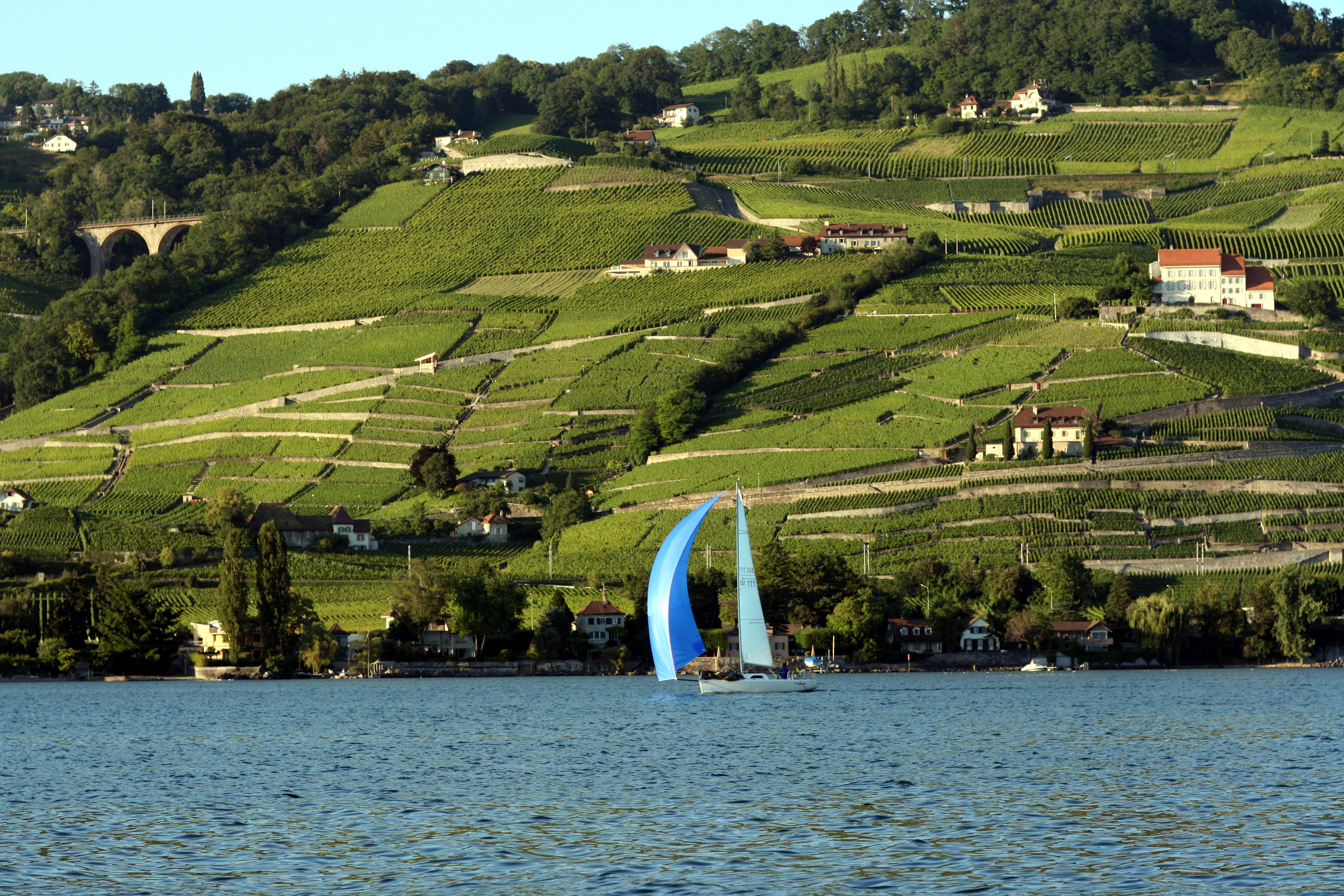
Vineyards near Lausanne

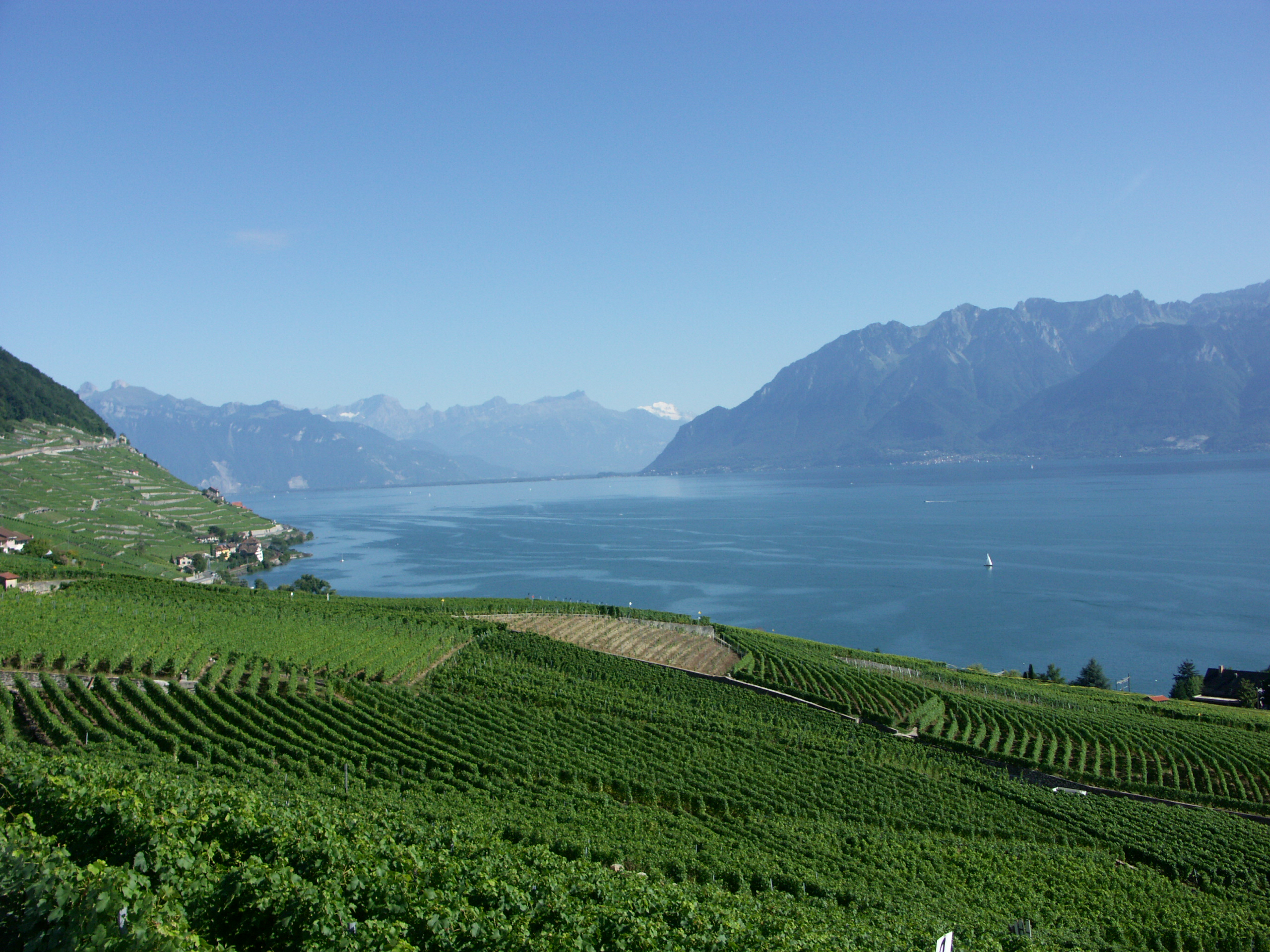
Lake Geneva and the Swiss Alps from Lavaux.

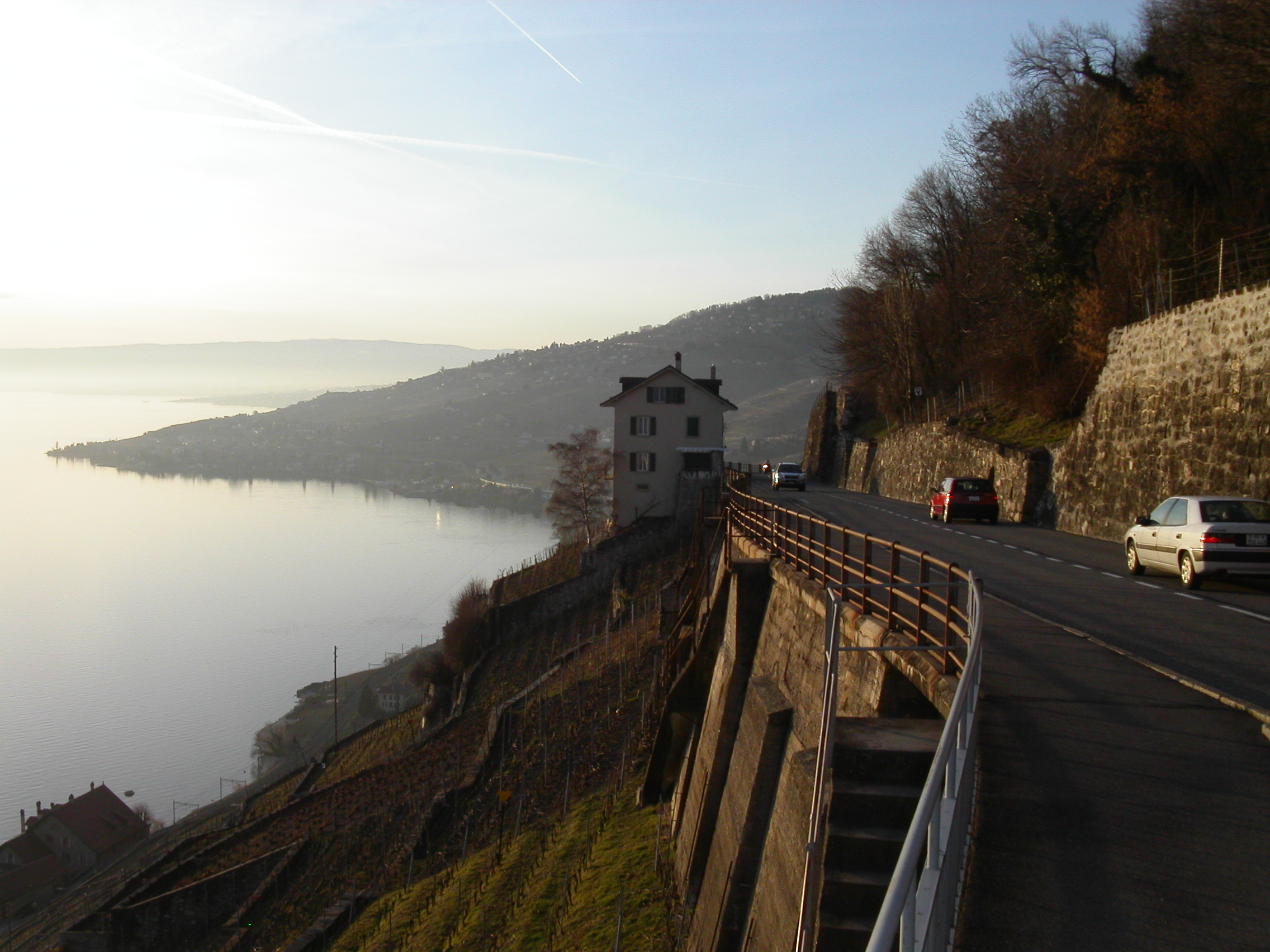
Lake Geneva from the Lavaux, looking towards Lausanne.

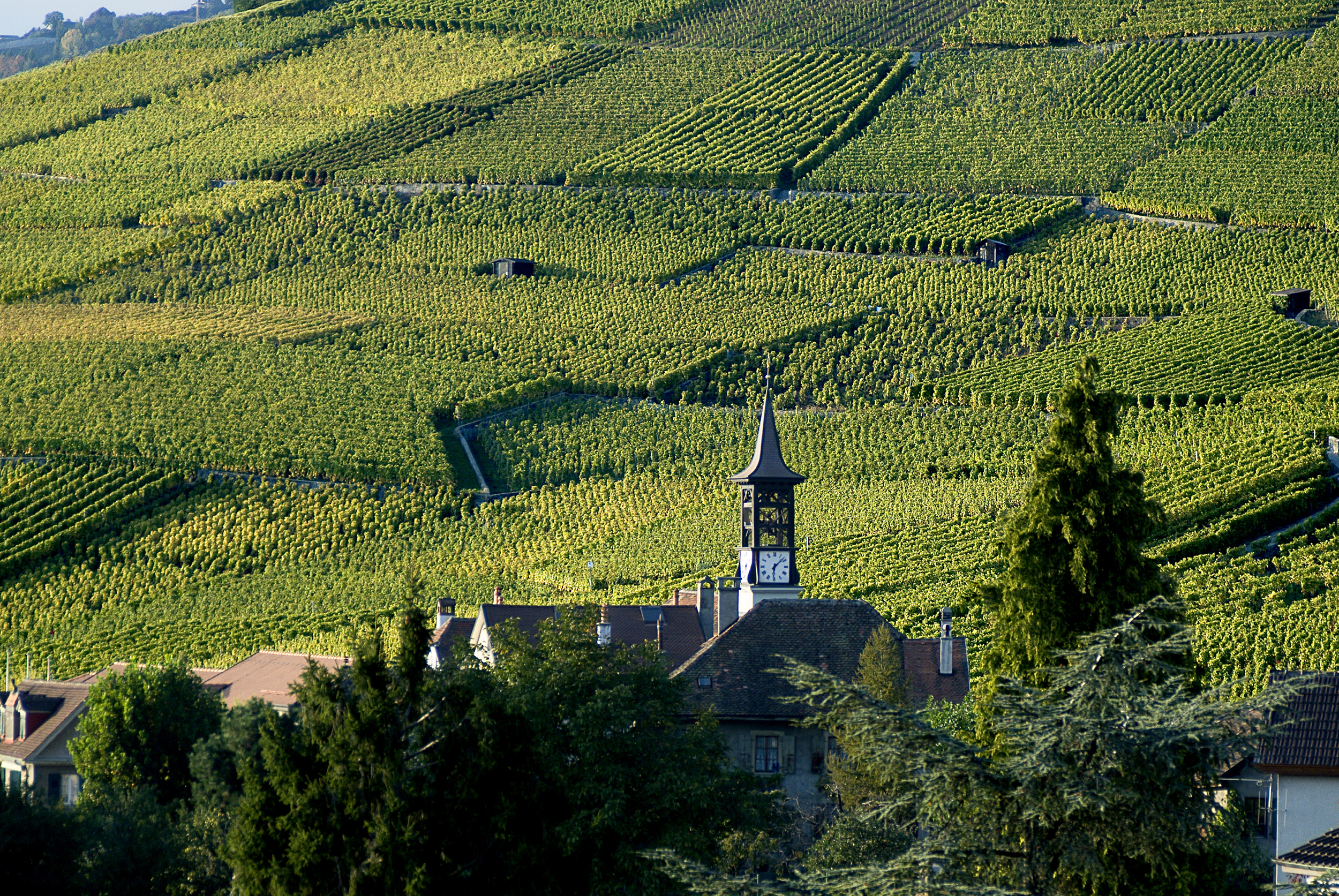
Lavaux Vineyard Terraces.

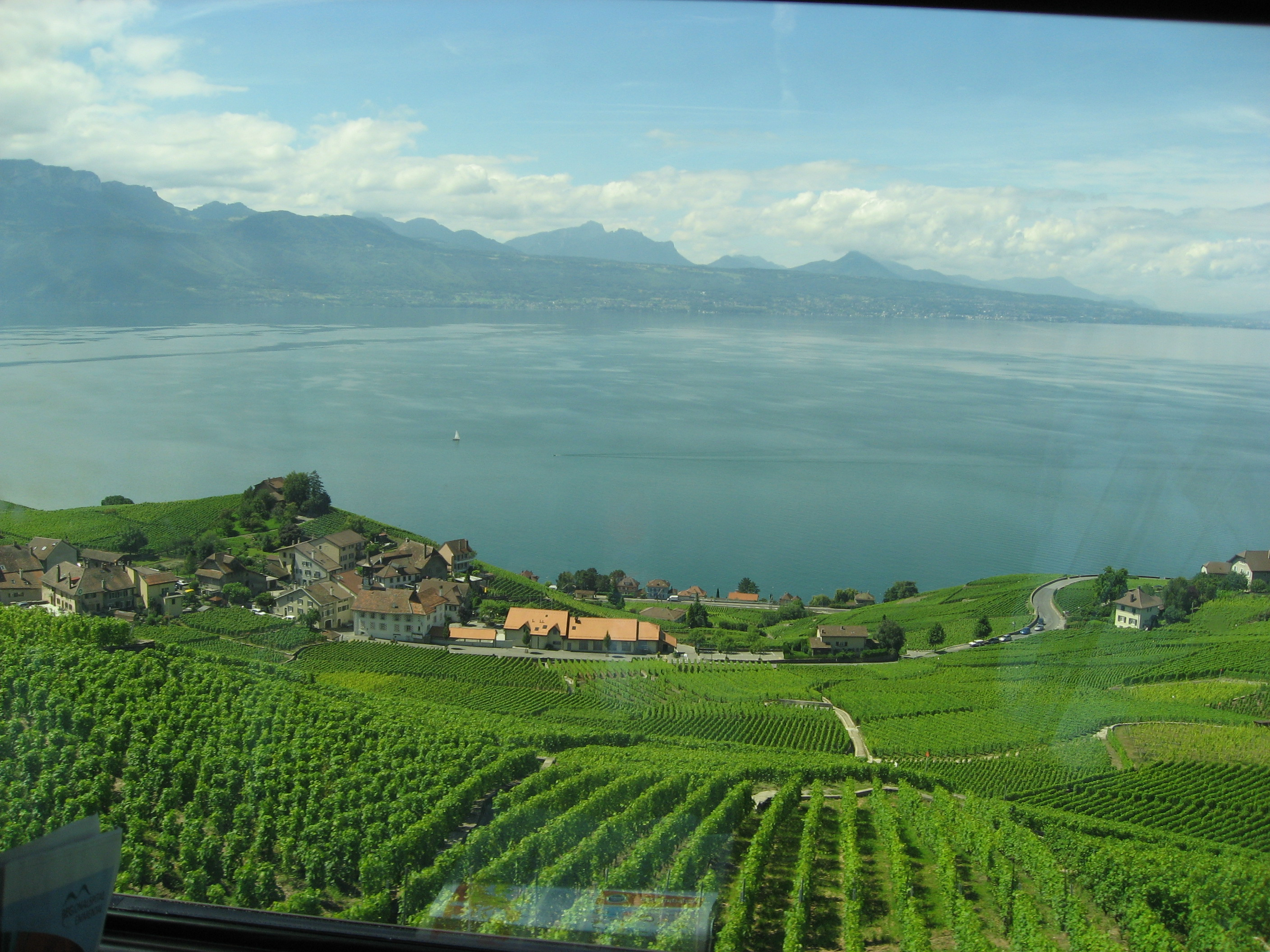
Lavaux from the railway line going from Lausanne to Palézieux and Bern.

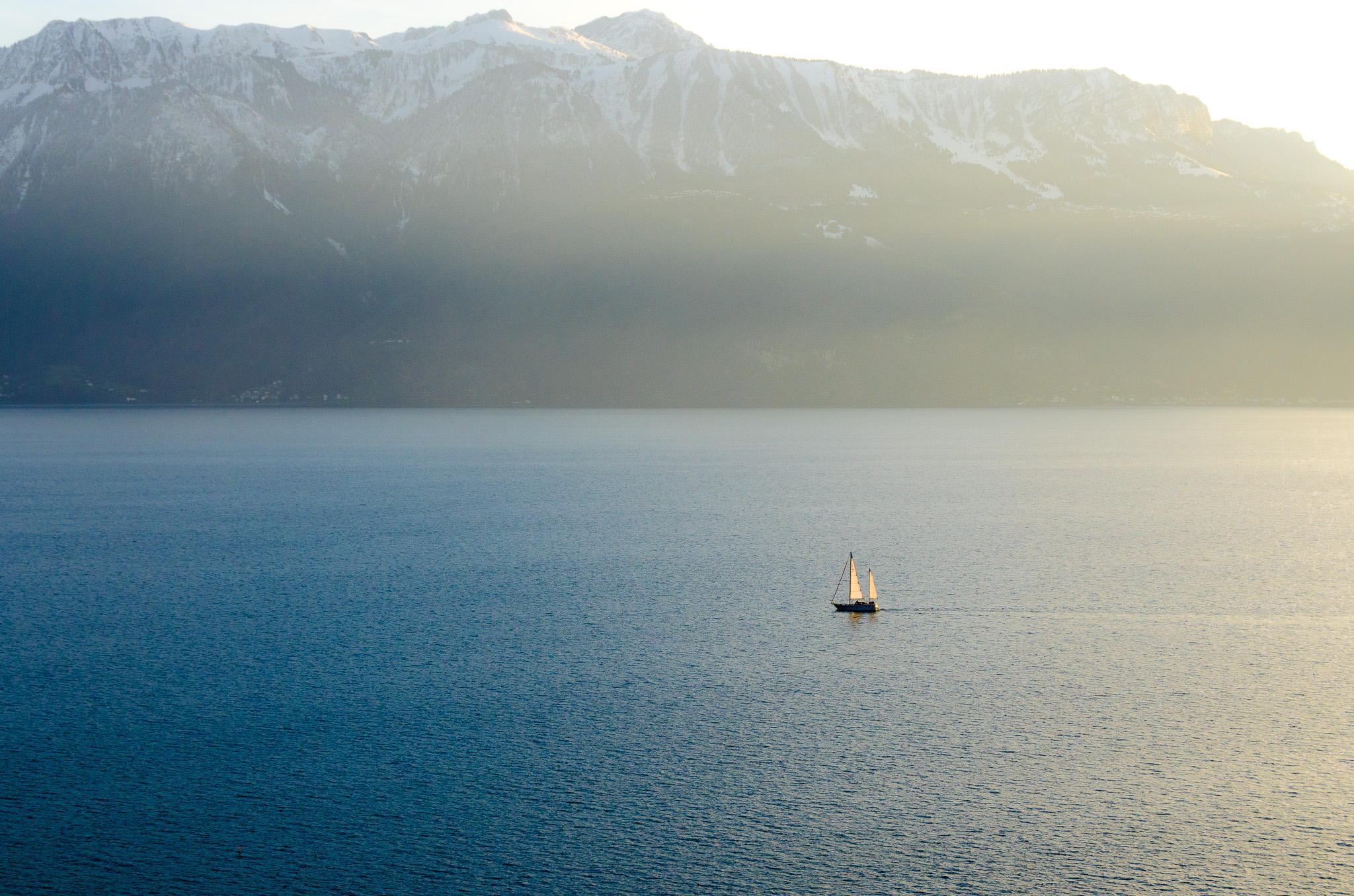
Lake Geneva seen from the vineyards.
