= 2020 in Norway =

- Centuries: 19th; 20th; 21st
- Decades: 2000s; 2010s; 2020s
- See also: List of years in Norway

Events in the year 2020 in Norway.

== Incumbents ==
- Monarch – Harald V.
- President of the Storting – Tone Wilhelmsen Trøen (Conservative).
- Prime Minister – Erna Solberg (Conservative).

== Events ==
- 1 January
  - Multiple citizenship is legalised.
  - Both parents of newborn children will automatically be the legal guardian, regardless of whether they are married or live together.
  - The municipal and county reform come into effect:
    - The county of Agder is established by unification of the former counties of Aust-Agder and Vest-Agder.
    - The county of Innlandet is established by unification of the former counties of Hedmark and Oppland.
    - The county of Troms og Finnmark is established by unification of the former counties of Troms and Finnmark.
    - The county of Vestfold og Telemark is established by unification of the former counties of Vestfold and Telemark.
    - The county of Vestland is established by unification of the former counties of Hordaland and Sogn og Fjordane.
    - The county of Viken is established by unification of the former counties of Akershus, Buskerud and Østfold.
    - The number of municipalities is reduced from 422 to 356 as of 42 municipal mergers.
- 3 January – The funeral of Ari Behn is held at Oslo Cathedral.
- 7 January – A fire erupts in the parking garage at Stavanger Airport Sola damaging around 60 vehicles. The fire is said to have come from an old petrol car.
- 9 January – The hearings into the NAV scandal commences, calling upon the Prime Minister, Minister of Labour Anniken Hauglie, Minister of Justice Jøran Kallmyr, and former Ministers of Labour Hanne Bjurstrøm and Anniken Huitfeldt.
- 20 January – The Progress Party announces that they will be withdrawing from Solberg's Cabinet after prolonged disagreement with fellow coalition parties, thereby also reducing the government to a minority.
- 24 January – Prime Minister Erna Solberg presents her new cabinet, now a minority government consisting of the Conservatives, Liberals and Christian Democrats.
- 15 February – the final round of the Melodi Grand Prix 2020 was held; Ulrikke Brandstorp emerging as winner.
- 17 February – Widerøe cuts 4,000 flights due to high costs.
- 11 March – Trine Skei Grande announced her stepping down as leader of the Liberal Party.
- 26 March – The Iraqi-Kurdish Islamic scholar and militant Mullah Krekar is extradited from Norway to Italy, where he is sentenced to jail for leading a jihadist network.
- 28 March – Nicolai Tangen is announced as the new director of Norges Bank Investment Management, succeeding longtime director Yngve Slyngstad.
- 18 April – News breaks out that Nicolai Tangen paid for a multi-million NOK "dream seminar" in New York City in November 2019. Attendees of the seminar included the director of Norges Bank Investment Management Yngve Slyngstad, meanwhile Tangen applied for the position as director after Slyngstad, as well as top-level politicians and diplomats.
- 28 April – Tom Hagen, whose wife disappeared on 31 October 2018, is arrested and charged with murder or complicity to murder. He was released shortly after
- 7 May – The trial against Philip Manshaus commences in Oslo District Court. The conviction fell on 11 June.
- 5 June – Thousands participate in the largest Black Lives Matter demonstration in Norway, gathering outside the US Embassy in Oslo.
- 17 June – Norway is elected to a two-year term to the United Nations Security Council to begin on 1 January 2021, during the 2020 Security Council Elections.
- 14 August – Petter Northug is arrested for speeding and also became suspected for drug possession. The conviction fell on 22 December.
- 22 August – Protests broke out during an anti-Islam rally in Bergen.
- 30 August – Protests broke out during an anti-Islam rally in Oslo.
- 1 September – Nicolai Tangen commenced his tenure as director of Norges Bank Investment Management, after transferring his share in his hedge fund AKO Capital to a foundation, the Ako Foundation.
- 8 September – The trial against Laila Bertheussen commenced in Oslo District Court.
- 26 September – Guri Melby was formally elected new leader of the Liberal Party.
- 29 September – Geir Lippestad was announced as the leading figure of a new political party, Centre (Norwegian: Sentrum), hoping to field candidates in the 2021 Norwegian parliamentary election.
- 1 October – Labour MP Jan Bøhler surprisingly rescinded his Labour membership and joined the Centre Party.
- 11 December – Construction of the Fornebu Line commenced officially.
- 12 December – Maskorama became 2020's most viewed program on linear television in Norway, with a viewership of 1 264 000.
- 30 December – A mudslide in Ask, Gjerdrum claimed several houses and human lives.

=== COVID-19 pandemic ===
Leaders associated with the COVID-19 pandemic:

- Bent Høie, Minister of Health and Care Services
- Bjørn Guldvog, director of the Norwegian Directorate for Health
- Espen Rostrup Nakstad, acting deputy director of the Norwegian Directorate for Health
- Camilla Stoltenberg, director of the Norwegian Institute of Public Health
- Preben Aavitsland, chief physician in the Norwegian Institute of Public Health

Timeline:

- 26 February - the first confirmed COVID-19 case in Norway
- 12 March - the first confirmed COVID-19 death in Norway
- 12 March - start of the nationwide lockdown, closing all kindergartens, schools, universities and colleges, gyms, swimming arenas and hairdressers
- 13 March - the Government of Norway issued the first economic crisis package, of 6.5 billion kr
- 15 March - increase of the nationwide lockdown, closing all psychologists, opticians, physiotherapists and similar health offices
- 19 March - the Government of Norway issued part two of the first economic crisis package
- 19 March - increase of the nationwide lockdown, enforcing a ban on sleepovers in cabins and lodges ("the lodge ban")
- 21 March - the Parliament of Norway passed an emergency mandate law, lasting one month
- 21 March - the Parliament of Norway passed a new economic crisis package
- 31 March - the Parliament of Norway passed a new economic crisis package
- 8 April - the death toll reached 100
- 20 April - decrease of the nationwide lockdown, opening kindergartens, dentists, psychologists and physiotherapists
- 20 April - repeal of "the lodge ban"
- 21 April - the Parliament of Norway prolonged the emergency mandate law, lasting one month
- 27 April - decrease of the nationwide lockdown, opening primary schools for grades 1–4 as well as upper secondary schools for vocational students

=== Sports ===
- 9–14 January - The group stage of the 2020 European Men's Handball Championship is held in Trondheim.
- 18 January - Erling Haaland made his league debut for Borussia Dortmund and scored a hat-trick.
- 15 February – Casper Ruud won the 2020 Argentina Open, becoming the first Norwegian tennis player to win an ATP Tour tournament.
- 15 February – Casper Ruud was announced as climbing to 34th place on the ATP rankings, the highest rank of any Norwegian, surpassing his own father Christian Ruud who peaked at 39th. In the course of 2020, Casper Ruud reached new all-time high ranks of 36th in March, then 34th, 30th and 25th in September.
- 19–22 February - The 2020 Women's Bandy World Championship was held in Oslo.
- 23 February - Jarl Magnus Riiber became the winningest racer in a single season of the FIS Nordic Combined World Cup, surpassing Hannu Manninen's previous record with his 13th race victory. Riiber would later win his 14th race of the season.
- 29 February–1 March - The 2020 World Allround Speed Skating Championships was held in Hamar.
- 5–11 March - The World Junior Alpine Skiing Championships 2020 was held in Narvik. Scheduled to last until 14 March, it was aborted on the evening of 11 March because of the COVID-19 pandemic.
- 7 March – The concluding race of several winter sports World Cup seasons, in which Norwegians emerged as overall winners:

- The 2019–20 FIS Alpine Ski World Cup for men, won by Aleksander Aamodt Kilde.
- The 2019–20 FIS Cross-Country World Cup for women, won by Therese Johaug.
- The 2019–20 FIS Nordic Combined World Cup for men, won by Jarl Magnus Riiber.

- 12 March – The concluding race of the 2019–20 FIS Ski Jumping World Cup for women, won by Maren Lundby.
- 14 March – The concluding race of the 2019–20 Biathlon World Cup for men, won by Johannes Thingnes Bø.
- 7 March – Astrid Uhrenholdt Jacobsen raced for the last time in cross-country skiing.
- 8 March - Håvard Bøkko raced for the last time in speed skating.
- 11 June - Sondre Nordstad Moen established a European record in the 25 000 metre track run at the Bislett Impossible Games.
- 16 June - 2020 Eliteserien commences play after being suspended during the pandemic, originally being scheduled to start on 4 April.
- 8 August - Sondre Nordstad Moen established a European record in the one hour track run at Kristiansand stadion. It was later communicated that the record would not be ratified.
- 14 August - Jakob Ingebrigtsen established a European record in the 1500 metres in Monaco of 3:28.68 minutes.
- 23 August - Karsten Warholm established a European record, improving his own, in the 400 metres hurdles in Stockholm of 46.87 seconds.
- 24–30 August – The 2020 ICF Canoe Marathon World Championship were supposed to be held in Sandvika. Due to the COVID-19 pandemic the championships were first postponed, then cancelled altogether.
- 24 August – Andreas Leknessund won the U-23 time trial event at the 2020 European Road Cycling Championships.
- 27 August – Jonas Hvideberg won the U-23 road race event at the 2020 European Road Cycling Championships.
- 9 September - The Norwegian Handball Federation board chose Trondheim as the sole venue of the 2020 European Women's Handball Championship in December 2020.
- 10 September - The Football Association of Norway board cancelled the 2020 Norwegian Football Cup.
- 15 September - Hedda Hynne established a world leading time in the women's 800 metres of 1:58.10 minutes. It was beaten by only one runner before the end of 2020.
- 18 September - The Football Association of Norway board cancelled the 2020 3. divisjon and the 2020 women's 2. divisjon.
- 10–11 October – The Norwegian Ice Hockey Federation convention decided to bid for the 2027 Men's Ice Hockey World Championships.
- 16 November - The Norwegian Handball Federation board chose to pull Norway's venue (Trondheim) out of the 2020 European Women's Handball Championship in December 2020.
- 9 December - FK Bodø/Glimt became the first ever team to score 100 goals in Eliteserien (the tally ended on 104), among a dozen other league records.
- 20 December - Norway won the 2020 European Women's Handball Championship.

== Anniversaries ==
- 950 years since the foundation of Bergen.
- 250 years since the introduction of Freedom of the press in Denmark-Norway by Johann Friedrich Struensee. The introduction was repealed shortly after.
- 1 January – 50 years since the Value Added Tax (VAT) of 20% was introduced and becomes the state's largest source of income.
- 15 February – 100 years since the birth of Anne-Cath. Vestly.
- 19 March – 100 years since the birth of Kjell Aukrust.
- 17 June – 100 years since the foundation of Farmers' Party (later known as Centre Party).
- 28 August – 50 years since the foundation of The People's Movement against Norwegian Membership of EEC (precursor to No to the EU)
- 10 August – 300 years since Moss got status as a city.
- 9 October – 100 years since the birth of Jens Bjørneboe.
- 12 November – 300 years since the death of Peter Wessel Tordenskiold.
- 30 November – 100 years since the Labour Party accepts the Twenty-one Conditions and formally became a Communist Party.

== Deaths ==
=== January ===
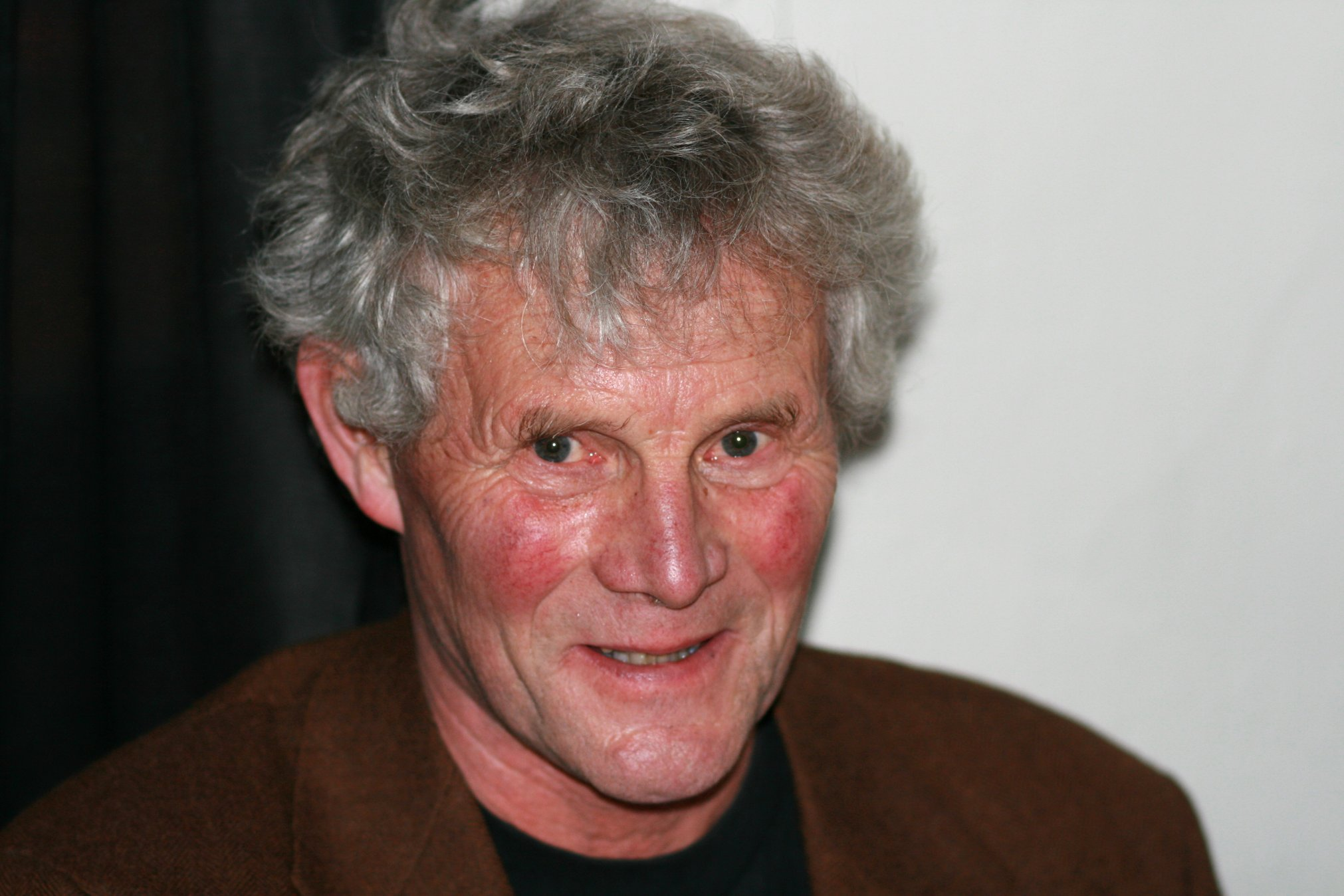
Tor Obrestad

- 1 January – Laurie Grundt, painter (b. 1923).
- 5 January – Guri Ingebrigtsen, politician (b. 1952).
- 5 January – Bjørn Unneberg, politician (b. 1928).
- 8 January – Christine Præsttun, television presenter (b. 1971).
- 9 January – Bergljot Sandvik-Johansen, gymnast and figure skater (b. 1922).
- 12 January – Gunnar Østrem, glaciologist (b. 1922).
- 12 January – Frank Nervik, footballer (b. 1934).
- 15 January – Karl Sundby, actor (b. 1953).
- 25 January – Tor Obrestad, writer (b. 1938).
- 26 January – Magnhild Skjesol, handballer (b. 1931).
- 26 January – Terje Meyer, designer (b. 1942).
- 27 January – Haakon Bjørklid, illustrator (b. 1925).

=== February ===
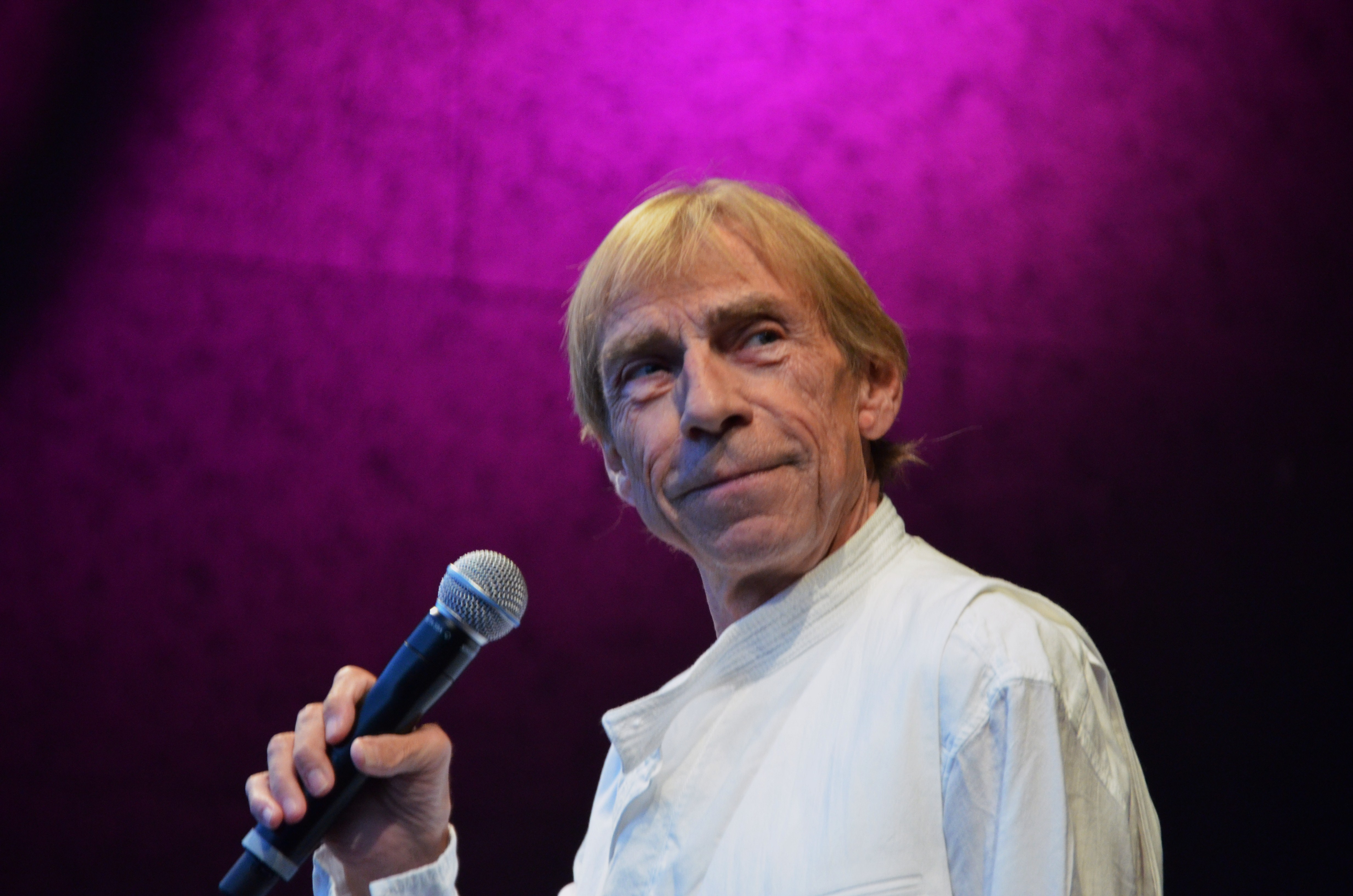
Jahn Teigen

- 3 February – Knut Rønningen, biotechnologist (born 1938).
- 6 February – Hans Petter Hansen, singer (b. 1948).
- 11 February – Jack Kramer, footballer (b. 1939).
- 12 February – Jan E. Hansen, writer and critic (b. 1959).
- 13 February – Herman Kahan, writer (b. 1926).
- 17 February – Per Oskar Andersen, neurologist (b. 1930).
- 17 February – Barry Matheson, impresario (b. 1941).
- 18 February – Jon Christensen, jazz drummer (b. 1943).
- 21 February – Erling Sandmo, historian and music critic (b. 1963).
- 23 February – Morten Wilhelm Wilhelmsen, ship-owner (b. 1937).
- 24 February – Jahn Teigen, singer (b. 1949).
- 27 February – Annie Riis, author (b. 1927).

=== March ===
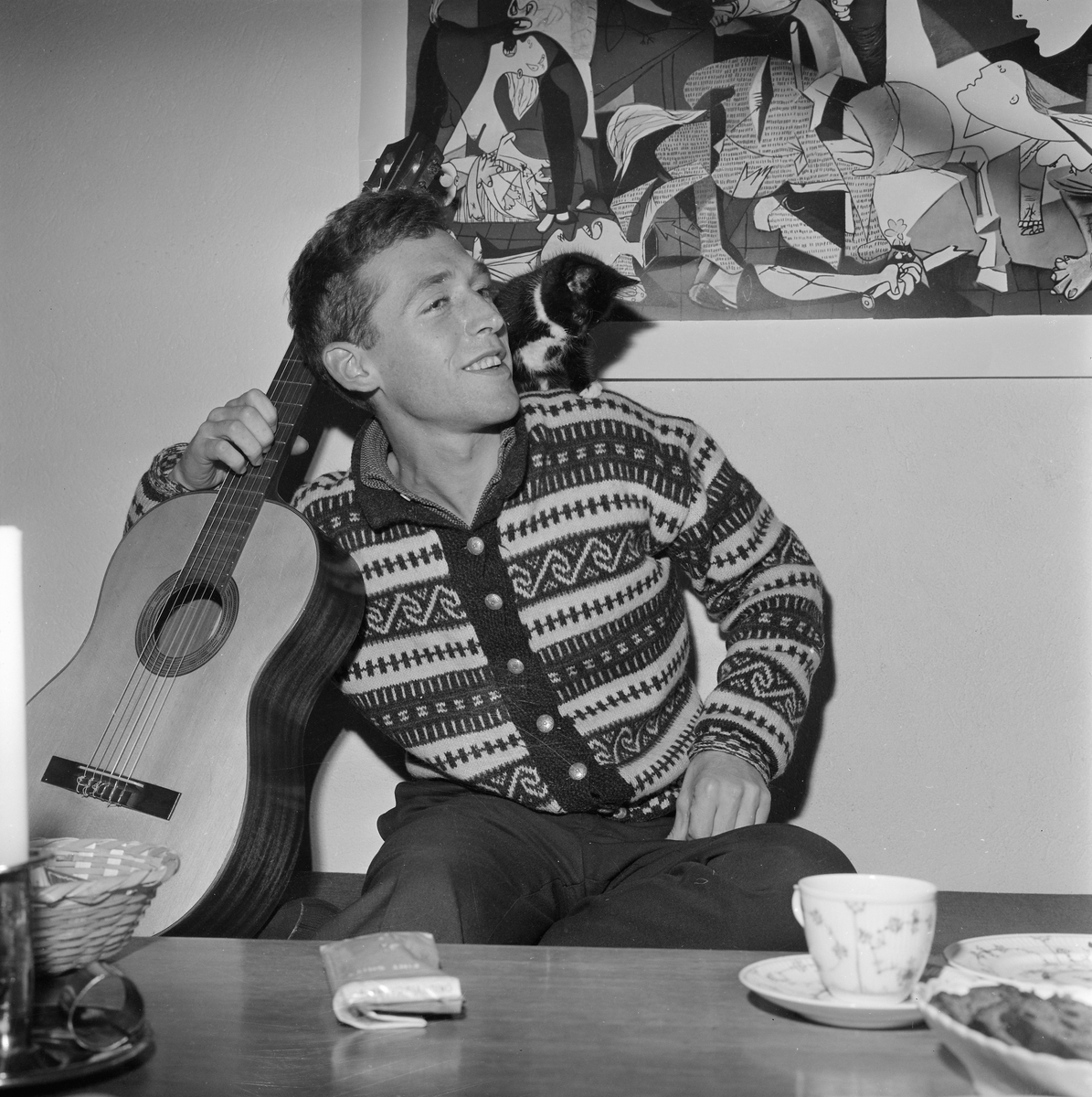
Alf Cranner

- 1 March – Sven Ivar Dysthe, furniture designer (b. 1931).
- 3 March – Alf Cranner, singer (b. 1936).
- 4 March – Finn Eriksen, trumpeter (b. 1937).
- 4 March – Leiv O. Holstad, Christian philanthropist (b. 1951).
- 8 March – Jan-Henrik Fredriksen, politician (b. 1956).
- 10 March – Knut Hendriksen, opera director (b. 1944).
- 14 March – Jon Atle Gaarder, diplomat (b. 1934).
- 16 March – Ranveig Frøiland, politician (b. 1945).
- 16 March – Jan Levor Njargel, politician (b. 1943).
- 22 March – Markvard Sellevoll, geophysicist (b. 1923).
- 24 March – Kari Onstad, actress (b. 1941).
- 30 March – Hjørdis Nerheim, philosopher (b. 1940).
- 31 March – Ragnar Kristoffersen, politician (b. 1941).

=== April ===
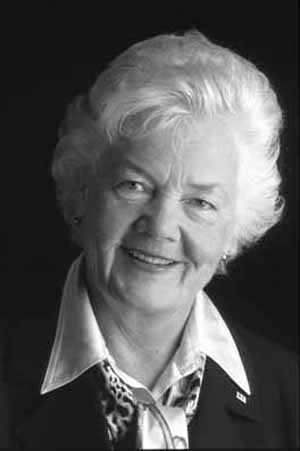
Astrid Nøklebye Heiberg

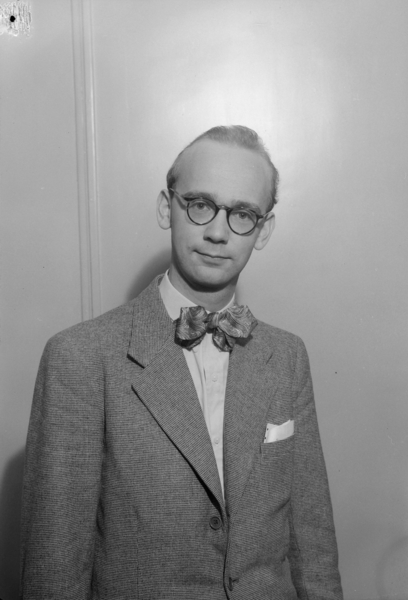
Jon Ola Norbom

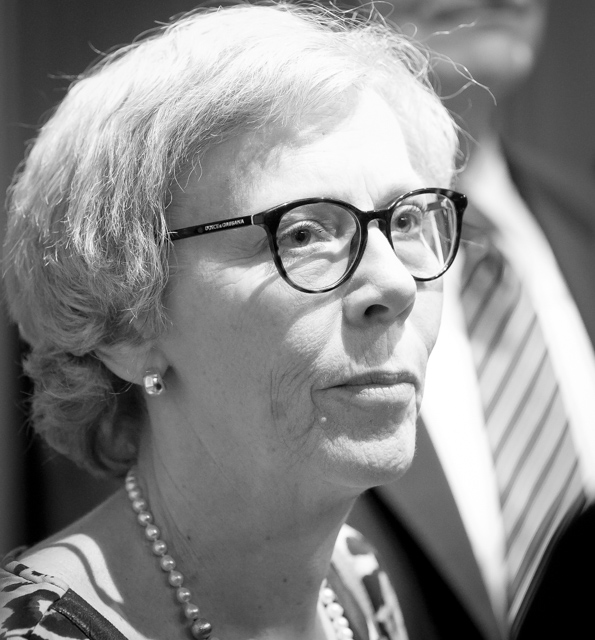
Elisabeth Berge

- 2 April – Astrid Nøklebye Heiberg, politician (b. 1936)
- 5 April – Svein Ellingsen, psalmist (b. 1929).
- 9 April
  - Bjørn Haug, jurist (b. 1928).
  - Torvild Aakvaag, industrialist (b. 1927).
- 11 April – Arne Wilhelmsen, ship-owner (b. 1929).
- 12 April – Axel Berg (b. 1938).
- 12 April – Jon Ola Norbom, politician (b. 1923).
- 13 April – Jens Erik Fenstad, mathematician (b. 1935).
- 14 April – Elisabeth Berge, civil servant (b. 1954).
- 16 April – Arne Nilsen, politician (b. 1924).
- 16 April – Lars Bucher-Johannessen, publisher (b. 1929).
- 22 April – Inger Heldal, actress (b. 1940).
- 27 April – Johannes Gjerdåker, writer (b. 1936).

=== May ===
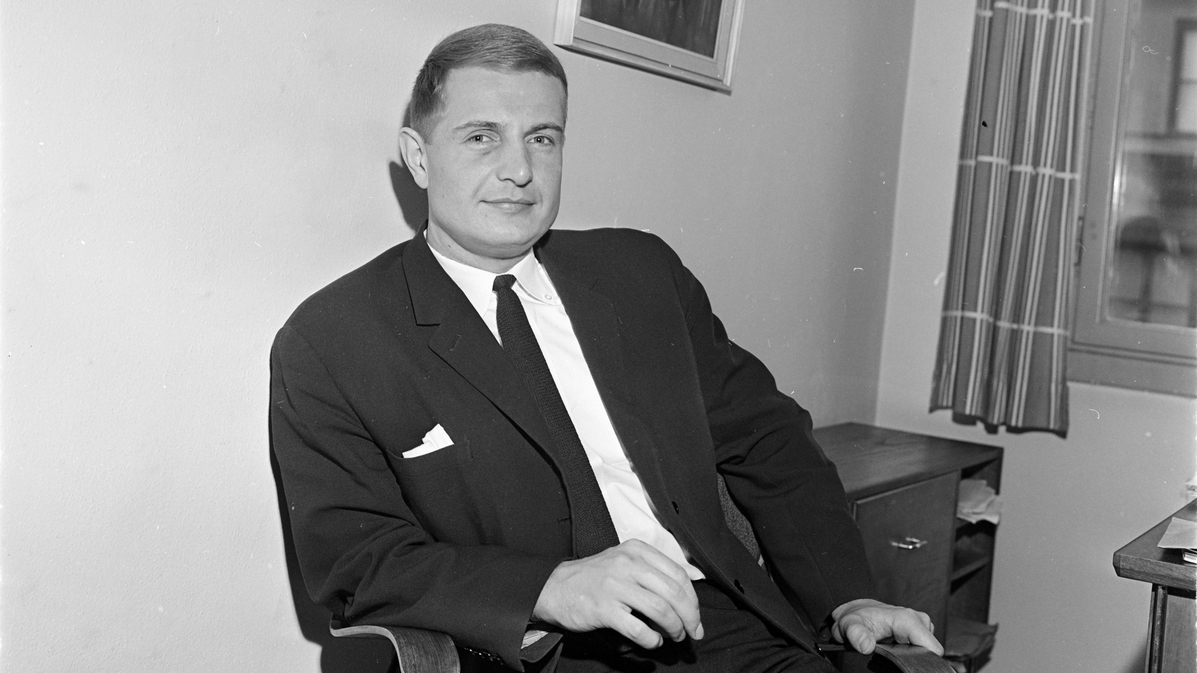
Erik Tandberg

- 2 May – Erik Tandberg, space aviation engineer (b. 1932).
- 3 May – Leiv Stensland, politician (b. 1934).
- 5 May – Kjell Karlsen, band leader (b. 1931).
- 19 May – Arvid Torgeir Lie, writer (b. 1938).
- 20 May – Egil Grandhagen, missionary leader (b. 1947).
- 21 May
  - Arnulf Kolstad, social psychologist (b. 1942).
  - Bekim Sejranović, novelist (b. 1972).
- 22 May – Torgeir Flatmark, chemist (b. 1931).
- 23 May – Kåre Dæhlen, ambassador (b. 1926).
- 27 May – Vegard Vigerust, writer (b. 1925).
- 31 May – Kjell B. Hansen, politician (b. 1967).

=== June ===
- 6 June – Gunnar Nordhus, researcher and convicted fraudster (b. 1949).
- 7 June – Edith Thallaug, opera singer (b. 1929).
- 13 June – Helge Rykkja, lyricist (b. 1943).
- 13 June – Knut Bohwim, film director (b. 1931).
- 15 June – Janne Bondi Johannessen, linguist (b. 1960).
- 17 June – Astrid Gjertsen, politician (b. 1928).
- 20 June – Svein Arne Hansen, sports official (b. 1946).
- 20 or 21 June – Frank Tømmervåg, footballer (b. 1951).
- 27 June – Marit Røgeberg, politician (b. 1945).
- 30 June – Nils Fredrik Wisløff, civil servant (b. ).

=== July ===
- 1 July – Beate Grimsrud, novelist (b. 1963).
- 5 July – Grethe Ryen, actress (b. 1949).
- 8 July – Finn Christian Jagge, alpine skier (b. 1966).
- 14 July – Borghild Røyseland, politician (b. 1926).
- 19 July – Jan Berg, politician (b. 1941).
- 19 July – Nils Henrik Eggen, architect (b. 1931).

=== August ===
- 1 August – Harald Hille, architect (b. 1921).
- 1 August – Synnøve Strigen, actress (b. 1934).
- 9 August – Brita Blomquist, television presenter (b. 1932).
- 10 August – Einar Høgetveit, judge (b. 1949)
- 13 August – Tor Bach, editor (b. 1964).
- 13 August – Per Adde, painter (b. 1926).
- 15 August – Yngvar Lundh, engineer (b. 1932).
- 20 August – Arne Helvik, politician (b. 1926).
- 23 August – Bjørn Skogmo, author (b. 1948).
- 24 August – Ingemann Ellingsen, rector (b. 1928).
- 26 August – Hans M. Barstad, theologian (b. 1947).
- 26 August – Ørnulf Tofte, police officer (b. 1922).
- 27 August – Ivar Ueland, politician (b. 1943).
- 27 August – Bjørn Lind, anesthesiologist (b. 1920).

=== September ===
- 1 September – Terje Steen, ice hockey player (b. 1944).
- 1 September – Inger Lise Nyberg, politician (b. 1942).
- 4 September – Harald Are Lund, radio presenter (b. 1946).
- 9 September – Dagfinn Rian, theologian (b. 1942).
- 13 September – Hilchen Thode Sommerschild, psychiatrist (b. 1926).
- 18 September – Knut Utstein Kloster, psalmist (b. 1929).
- 19 September – Ralph Ditlef Kolnes, priest and novelist (b. 1937).
- 26 September – Erik Bartnes, politician (b. 1939).
- 27 September – Arvid Møller, author (b. 1939).

=== October ===
- 1 October – Hans Eriksen, politician (b. 1936).
- 8 October – Gudrun Waadeland, singer (b. 1938).
- 20 October – Dag Klaveness, limnologist (b. 1945).
- 21 October – Geir Finne, politician (b. 1948).
- 23 October – Tor Torgersen, athlete (b. 1928).
- 25 October – Lene Løken, politician (b. 1947).
- 25 October – Inge Myrvoll, politician (b. 1948).

=== November ===
- 6 November – Jan Rodvang, footballer (b. 1939).
- 9 November – Friftjof Feydt, lawyer (b. 1946).
- 14 November – GT-Sara, comedy singer (b. 1924).
- 15 November – Eli Sollied Øveraas, politician (b. 1949).
- 16 November – Arild Arnardo, circus director (b. 1942).
- 17 November – Trond Lykke, retailer (b. 1946).
- November – Sergei Demidov, handballer (b. 1961).
- 22 November – Jon Peter Rolie, novelist (b. 1945).
- 26 November – Nils Sletta, actor (b. 1943).

=== December ===
- 1 December – Erlend Rian, politician (b. 1941).
- 6 December – Tor Gilje, singer (b. 1939).
- 8 December – Kari Rolfsen, artist (b. 1938).
- 11 December – Ivar Asheim, theologian (b. 1927).
- 17 December – Bjørn Tysdahl, literary historian (b. 1933).
- 12 December – Thor Ole Rimejorde, sports official (b. 1933).
- 17 December – Leif Hagen, pornographic publisher (b. 1942).
- 17 December – Sverre Oddanger, footballer (b. 1928).
- 18 December – Anne Aanerud, textile artist (b. 1952).
- 28 December – Helge Tverberg, mathematician (b. 1935).
- 29 December – Arne A. Jensen, media executive (b. 1954).
