= Tistilbekken =

River in Norway

- Interactive map of the river

Location
- Country: Norway
- County: Akershus
- Municipality: Gjerdrum

Physical characteristics
- Mouth
  - coordinates: 60°03′46″N 11°02′06″E

Tistilbekken, also called Fjelstadbekken, is a river in the village of Ask in Gjerdrum Municipality in Akershus county, Norway. It flows through the residential area Nystulia and from Brådalsfjellet.

== 2020 Gjerdrum landslide ==
Tistilbekken flows into a soil area consisting of a lot of clay. On the night of 30 December 2020, the area was hit by the 2020 Gjerdrum landslide which is described as the most serious in Norway of this type in recent times. Large amounts of precipitation are considered to have had a triggering factor. Tistilbekken's role in the stability of clay and quick clay in the area has been discussed for several years.

== See also ==
- List of rivers in Norway
