= Nystulia =

Road in Norway

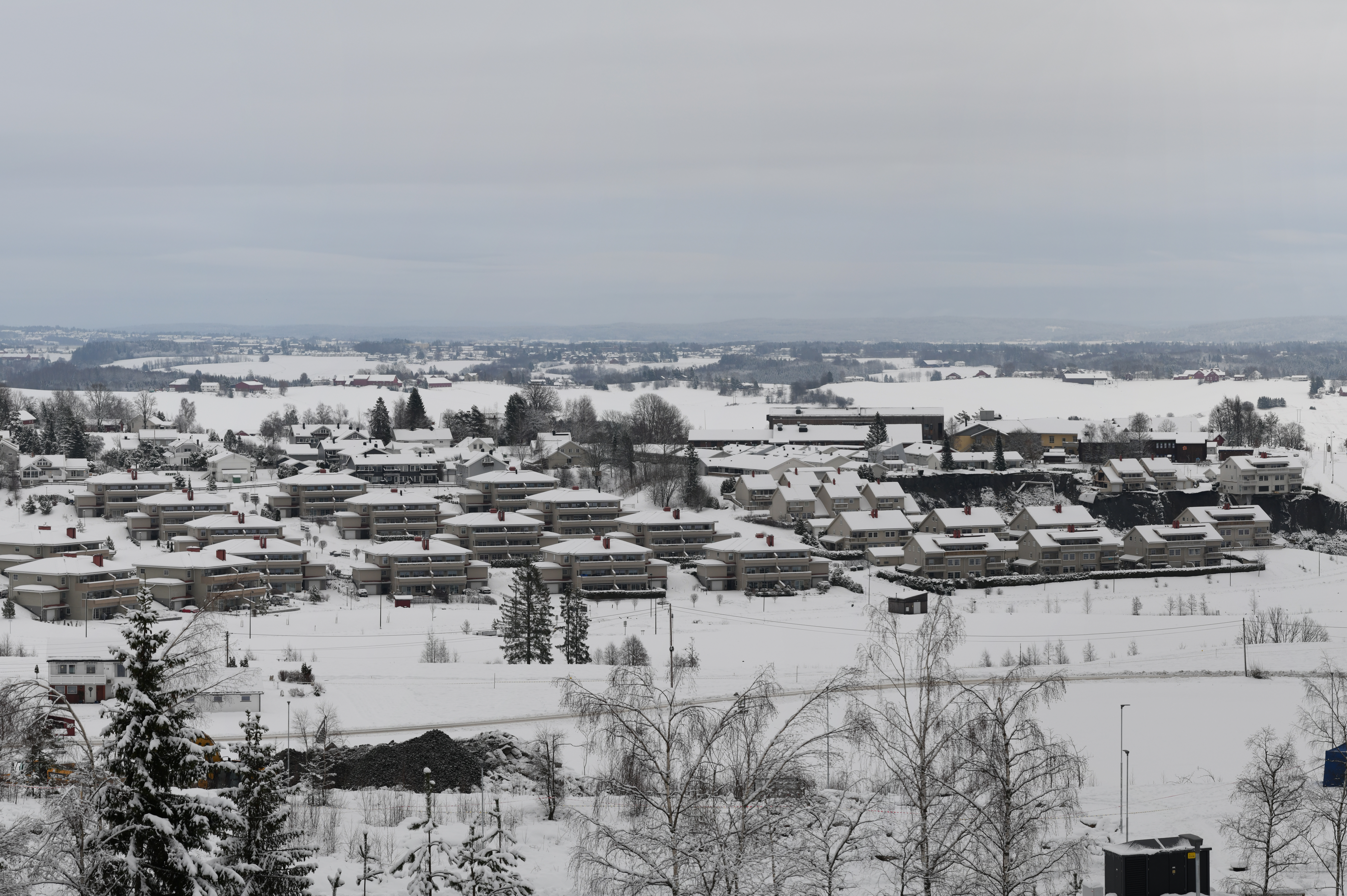
- Nystulia after the December 2020 landslide.

- Location within Akershus
- Location: Ask, Gjerdrum, Akershus
- Coordinates: 60°03′58″N 11°02′04″E

Nystulia (1–147, 2–148) is a road built as a three-part road network in a residential area of the same name in the village of Ask, Gjerdrum municipality, Akershus county. The road is accessible via three intersections from Fjellinna road, where each branch of Nystulia does not converge within the residential area.

The river Tistilbekken flows partly open and partly in pipes through Nystulia.

The residential area was hit by the 2020 Gjerdrum landslide on the night of 30 December 2020, which is described as the most serious in Norway of this type in recent times.
