= Rønningen =

Rønningen is a Norwegian surname. Notable people with the surname include:

- Bjørn Rønningen (born 1937), Norwegian writer
- Børre Rønningen (born 1949), Norwegian politician
- Helene Rønningen (born 1998), Norwegian sprinter
- Ivar Rønningen (born 1975), Norwegian footballer
- Janne Rønningen (born 1969), Norwegian comedian and television presenter
- Jon Rønningen (born 1962), Norwegian sport wrestler
- Jonas Rønningen (born 1990), Norwegian footballer
- Knut Rønningen (1938–2020), Norwegian biotechnologist
- Lars Rønningen (born 1965), Norwegian sport wrestler
- Marie Rønningen (born 1994), Norwegian sailor
- Ståle Rønningen (born 1978), Norwegian footballer
