= John Armitage (investor) =

British banker (born 1959)

John Armitage CBE
- Born: John Christopher Armitage; 20 December 1959 (age 66)
- Citizenship: UK; Ireland (since 2018)
- Education: Pembroke College, Cambridge
- Occupation: Hedge fund manager
- Title: Co-founder and chief investment officer of Egerton Capital
- Spouse: Catherine Armitage

John Christopher Armitage (born 20 December 1959) is a British and Irish hedge fund manager. He is the co-founder and chief investment officer of Egerton Capital. As of October 2024, Forbes estimated his net worth at US$1.5 billion.

== Early life ==
John Christopher Armitage was born on 20 December 1959. He was educated at Eton College, and earned a degree in modern history from Pembroke College, Cambridge in 1981.

== Career ==
Armitage joined Morgan Grenfell in 1981, and was a director of Morgan Grenfell Asset Management from March 1991 until he left in 1994.

Armitage and William Bollinger co-founded Egerton Capital in 1994. Armitage is the chief investment officer.

In 2006, Armitage became a member of the investment board of the University of Cambridge.

In the year to 31 March 2014, Egerton made a profit of £141.4 million, which was divided between its 12 partners. At the end of 2017, Egerton had $18.8 billion in assets under management.

In 2019 the Sunday Times Rich List estimated his net worth as £600 million.

== Personal life ==
Armitage lives in London, England. He is married to Catherine Armitage.

In May 2017, he gave £500,000 to the Conservative Party. In 2022, Armitage left the Conservative Party and began donating to the Labour Party, with donations also made to the party leader Keir Starmer and Wes Streeting, the Shadow Health Secretary.

In 2018, he acquired Irish citizenship. In February 2018, he purchased a Park Avenue, New York apartment for US$18 million.
