= Nicolai Tangen =

Norwegian hedge fund manager (born 1966)

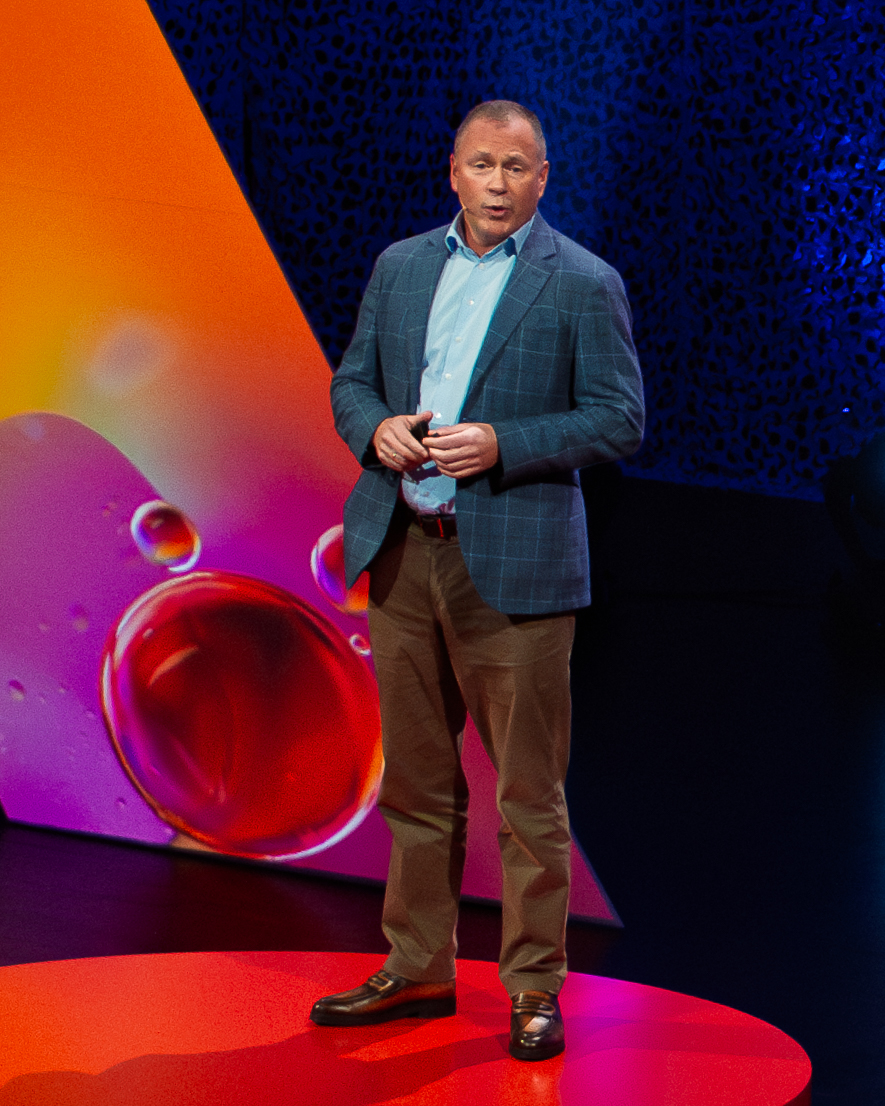
- Tangen in 2021
- Born: 10 August 1966 (age 60); Kristiansand, Agder, Norway
- Education: Norwegian Defence University College; Norwegian School of Economics; Wharton School of the University of Pennsylvania (BS); Courtauld Institute of Art (MA); London School of Economics (MSc)
- Occupation: Hedge fund manager
- Known for: Founder of AKO Capital
- Children: 3

Nicolai Tangen (born 10 August 1966) is a Norwegian hedge fund manager and, since September 2020, the CEO of Norges Bank Investment Management (NBIM). He is tasked with managing the Norwegian Sovereign Wealth Fund, which is the largest publicly held financial fund in the world and owns approximately 1.5% of the world's listed companies.

Before joining NBIM, Tangen lived in London, where he founded and managed the hedge fund AKO Capital. The Sunday Times Rich List in 2020 estimated Tangen's net worth at £550 million, an increase of £50 million from the previous year.

Tangen has actively funded initiatives within arts and education through the AKO Foundation. He is credited with holding the biggest private collection of modernist Nordic art in the world. In 2019, he was placed 6th in The Sunday Times Giving List, which ranks philanthropists from the UK based upon the proportion of personal wealth that they have given away each year.

In 2020, his appointment as the chief executive officer (CEO) at NBIM proved controversial with some sources describing it as “the biggest crisis in the fund’s 24-year history.”

== Education ==
Tangen was trained in interrogation and translation in Russian in the Norwegian Intelligence Services, before he attended the Norwegian School of Economics and the Wharton School of the University of Pennsylvania as an undergraduate during 1988–92. He holds master's degrees in art history from the Courtauld Institute of Art, London and in organisational psychology from the London School of Economics. He has education as a cook.

== Career ==
Tangen was an analyst at Cazenove & Co. before moving to Egerton Capital in 1997. Tangen left Egerton Capital in 2002. In 2005, he launched AKO Capital, a London-based hedge fund, which has £10.8 billion of assets under management. The Sunday Times ranked him among the 20 most successful hedge fund managers in the UK in its 2018 Rich List.

In March 2020, it was announced that Tangen would replace Yngve Slyngstad as CEO of Norges Bank Investment Management in September 2020, which manages the Norwegian Sovereign Wealth Fund, the largest in the world. His appointment became extremely controversial as a result of circumstances around the appointment. The Norwegian parliament's finance committee unanimously decided to instruct the minister of finance to intervene, making sure there would be no conflict of interests. Tangen then decided to sell out of AKO Capital, transferring the values and ownership to the charity organisation AKO Foundation. He also started transferring his personal fortune to a Norwegian bank account, meeting the public political demands at his own expense, being able to start as CEO in September 2020.

== Philanthropy ==
Tangen founded the AKO Foundation in April 2013, which focuses on education and the arts. The AKO Foundation has provided funding for the Jamie Oliver Food Foundation, Teach First, the London School of Economics, The Wharton School of the University of Pennsylvania, and The Courtauld Institute of Art. The Sunday Times reported in May 2019 that Tangen has given away more than £100 million to education and arts projects through his foundation. In October 2018, Tangen and his wife Katja donated $25 million to the University of Pennsylvania through the AKO Foundation. The funds will be used to create a new campus building, to be named Tangen Hall, and to establish an international scholarship fund. Tangen has supported 22 University of Pennsylvania students with scholarships since 2012. He is on Wharton's board of overseers.

Tangen has gifted his Nordic art collection to a Norwegian foundation as part of a project in his hometown of Kristiansand, Norway, and helped fund the conversion of a grain silo into a new museum, the Kunstsilo Museum, which opened in 2024. Tangen has sponsored The London Munch exhibition at the British Museum, which is the UK's largest exhibition of Norwegian painter Edvard Munch for nearly 50 years. The exhibition opened in April 2019.

== Personal life ==
Tangen is originally from Kristiansand, Norway. He is married to Katja and they have three children together.

In May 2019, it was announced that Tangen and his wife Katja had joined The Giving Pledge, committing at least half of their wealth to philanthropic causes during their lifetime or in their will.
