= AKO Capital =

British hedge fund

AKO Capital LLP
- Type: Private
- Industry: Investment management
- Founded: April 2005; 21 years ago
- Founders: Nicolai Tangen; Gorm Thomassen
- Headquarters: London, United Kingdom
- Key people: Patrick Hargreaves (CEO); Gorm Thomassen (CIO)
- Products: Hedge fund Long/short equity
- AUM: US$23.1 billion (2024)
- Number of employees: 70 (2020)
- Website: www.akocapital.com

AKO Capital (AKO) is a British investment management firm based in London that focuses on investment in equities. It was founded by Nicolai Tangen who later relinquished his position and ownership of the firm so he could manage the Government Pension Fund of Norway, the largest sovereign wealth fund in the world.

== Background ==
In 2005, Nicolai Tangen and Gorm Thomassen founded AKO Capital in London. They previously were part of the Norwegian Intelligence Service where they were trained in languages and interrogation. Nicolai also got a bachelor degree from Wharton School. Afterwards they had worked for firms like Cazenove and Egerton Capital. An American investment advisory firm stated their intelligence gathering expertise was an integral part of AKO.

According to Tangen, AKO has an investment philosophy focused on long-term holdings in quality companies with a systematic approach. The firm has teams dedicated to forensic accounting, behavioural analysis, market research and traditional equity research. Tangen likes to challenge his portfolio managers and demands that they record reasons for each investment decision made so it can be reviewed later on.

By 2020, AKO had grown significantly with $18 billion in assets under management and 70 employees. The main fund had delivered returns three times better than the market since its launch in October 2005.

In 2020 Tangen had relinquished control and all of his interest in AKO so he could become CEO of Norges Bank Investment Management to manage the Government Pension Fund of Norway. Patrick Hargreaves would take over as the firm's CEO while Thomassen would be CIO.

== Controversies ==
=== Insider trading ===
In June 2010, Anjam Ahmad a trader who worked at AKO until September 2009 plead guilty to the charged of insider trading by the Financial Services Authority which involved 18 listed shares between 15 May 2009 and 22 August 2009. He was fined £50,000 but escaped jail by agreeing to help the authorities with its investigation into an associate. He also agreed to pay 131,000 of the profits made. During the trial it was revealed he passed information on what shares AKO would buy and sell on a particular day to Rupinder Sidhu, a management consultant and close friend that enabled him to spread bet and make around £524,000. The two created MSN Messenger accounts shortly before commencing their alleged scheme in the summer of 2009. AKO was not accused of any wrongdoing and would provide evidence for prosecution. When Tangen gave trading orders to Ahmad, the orders would be "held back" so Sidhu could place his own bets. On 15 December 2011, Sidhu was convicted of 22 counts of insider trading.

=== Tangen's appointment as CEO of Norges Bank Investment Management ===
In March 2020, it was announced that Tangen would replace Yngve Slyngstad as CEO of Norges Bank Investment Management in September 2020 to manage the Government Pension Fund of Norway. As it was the largest sovereign wealth fund in the world, his appointment immediately garnered attention and was extremely controversial given the circumstances. Tangen was not a well-known public figure in Norway and was not even shortlisted by the bank prior to the announcement. Norway Lawmakers felt Tangen was not suitable for the job and he was coming in at a time the fund had been performing poorly due to the COVID-19 pandemic.

Questions were raised about Tangen's conflict of interest due to AKO and Norway Lawmakers demanded that the appointment of Tangen to be thoroughly scrutinized. For example, it was revealed that there was an ongoing lawsuit between AKO and HM Revenue & Customs relating to incentive schemes as well as the fact that Tangen had personal investments worth $85 million in funds and companies based in tax havens. The Storting's Standing Committee on Finance and Economic Affairs instructed Jan Tore Sanner, the minister of finance to ensure that Tangen would have no conflict of interest before he could take up appointment in September. As a result, Tangen relinquished all of his financial interest and control of AKO which included stepping down from all AKO boards. His 43% stake in AKO would be transferred to AKO Foundation, a charitable foundation and his holdings worth $550 million in AKO funds would be sold.
