= Quick clay =

Type of glaciomarine and unstable clay prone to landslides

Quick clay, also known as Leda clay and Champlain Sea clay in Canada, is any of several distinctively sensitive glaciomarine clays found in Canada, Norway, Russia, Sweden, Finland, the United States, and other locations around the world. The clay is so unstable that when a mass of quick clay is subjected to sufficient stress, the material behavior may drastically change from that of a particulate material to that of a watery fluid. Landslides occur because of the sudden soil liquefaction caused by external solicitations such as vibrations induced by an earthquake, or massive rainfalls.

== Main deposits ==
Quick clay is found only in countries close to the North Pole, such as Russia, Canada, Norway, Sweden, Finland, and the United States (in Alaska), since they were glaciated during the Pleistocene epoch. In Canada, the clay is associated primarily with the Pleistocene-era Champlain Sea, in the modern Ottawa Valley, the St. Lawrence Valley, and the Saguenay River regions.

Quick clay has been the underlying cause of many deadly landslides. In Canada alone, it has been associated with more than 250 mapped landslides. Some of these are ancient, and may have been triggered by earthquakes.

== Clay colloids stability ==
Quick clay has a remolded strength which is much less than its strength upon initial loading. This is caused by its highly unstable clay particle structure.

Quick clay is originally deposited in a marine environment. Clay mineral particles are always negatively charged because of the presence of permanent negative charges and pH dependent charges at their surface. Because of the need to respect electro-neutrality and a net zero electrical charge balance, these negative electrical charges are always compensated by the positive charges born by cations (such as Na^{+}) adsorbed onto the surface of the clay, or present in the clay pore water. Exchangeable cations are present in the clay minerals interlayers and on the external basal planes of clay platelets. Cations also compensate the negative charges on the clay particle edges caused by the protolysis of silanol and aluminol groups (pH dependent charges). So, clay platelets are always surrounded by an electrical double layer (EDL), or diffuse double layer (DDL). The thickness of EDL depends on the salinity of water. Under salty conditions (at high ionic strength) EDL is compressed (or said to be collapsed). It facilitates the aggregation of clay platelets which flocculate and stick together in a more stable aggregates structure. After the marine clay deposit is uplifted and is no longer exposed to salt water conditions, rainwater can slowly infiltrate the poorly compacted clay layer and the excess of NaCl present in seawater can also diffuse out of the clay. As a result, the EDL is less compressed and can expand. It results in a stronger electrostatic repulsion between negatively charged clay platelets which can more easily become dispersed and form stable suspensions in water (peptization phenomenon). The effect leads to a destabilization of the clay aggregates structure.

In case of insufficient mechanical compaction of the clay layer, and with a shear stress, the weaker EDL compression by the salts in the quick clay results in clay particle repulsion and leads to their realignment in a structure that is weaker and unstable. Quick clay regains strength rapidly when salt is again added (compression of the EDL), which allows clay particles to restore their cohesion with one another.

== Formation of quick clay ==
At the height of the past glaciation (about 20,000 years ago), the land was 'pushed' down by the weight of the ice (isostatic depression). All of the ground-up rock was deposited in the surrounding ocean, which had penetrated significantly inland. The loose deposition of the silt and clay particles in the marine environment, allowed an unusual flocculation to take place. Essentially, this formed a strongly bonded soil skeleton, which was 'glued' by highly mobile sea-salt ions.

At this point, there was only the formation of very strong marine clay, which is found all over the world and highly stable, but with its own unique geotechnical problems. When the glaciers retreated, the land mass rose (post-glacial rebound), the clay was exposed, and formed the soil mass for new vegetation. The rainwater in these northern countries was quite aggressive to these clays, perhaps because it was softer (containing less calcium), or the higher silt content allowed more rainwater and snowmelt to penetrate. The final result was that the ionic 'glue' of the clay was weakened, to give a weak, loose soil skeleton, enclosing significant amounts of water (high sensitivity with high moisture content).

Quick clay deposits are rarely located directly at the ground surface, but are typically covered by a normal layer of topsoil. While this topsoil can absorb most normal stresses, such as normal rainfall or a modest earth tremor, a shock that exceeds the capacity of the topsoil layer — such as a larger earthquake, a large mass added near a slope, or an abnormal rainfall which leaves the topsoil fully saturated so that additional water has nowhere to permeate except into the clay — can disturb the clay and initiate the process of liquefaction.

== Disasters ==
Because the clay layer is typically covered with topsoil, a location which is vulnerable to a quick clay landslide is usually identifiable only by soil testing, and is rarely obvious to a casual observer. Thus human settlements and transportation links have often been built on or near clay deposits, resulting in a number of notable catastrophes:

- In 1702, a landslide destroyed almost all traces of the medieval town Sarpsborg in what is now Østfold county in Norway. 15 people and 200 animals were killed.
- On 19 May 1893, a landslide in Verdal Municipality, Norway, killed 116 people and destroyed 105 farms. It left a crater several kilometers in diameter.
- The most disastrous such landslide to affect North America occurred in 1908, when a slide into the frozen Du Lièvre River propelled a wave of ice-filled water into Notre-Dame-de-la-Salette, Quebec, causing the loss of 33 lives and the destruction of 12 homes.
- In 1955, a landslide affected part of the downtown of Nicolet, Quebec, causing $10 million in damages.
- In 1957, a large quick-clay landslide occurred in Lilla Edet, by the Göta River, in southwestern Sweden. A large part of a factory slid into the river, causing a thirty meter reduction in the river width. The earth mass coming into the river produced an approximately six meter high wave.
- On March 27, 1964, parts of Anchorage, Alaska built on sandy bluffs overlying "Bootlegger Cove clay" near Cook Inlet, most notably the Turnagain neighborhood, suffered landslide damage during the 1964 Alaska Earthquake. The neighborhood lost 75 houses in the landslide, and the destroyed area has since been turned into Earthquake Park.
- On 4 May 1971, 31 lives were lost when 40 homes were swallowed in a retrogressive flowslide in Saint-Jean-Vianney, Quebec, resulting in the relocation of the entire town when the government declared the area uninhabitable due to the presence of Leda clay. The event at Saint-Jean-Vianney contributed to the abandonment of the town of Lemieux, Ontario, in 1991, after a 1989 study showed it was also located on the same type of clay along the South Nation River. In 1993, those findings were borne out when the town's abandoned main street was swallowed by a massive 17-hectare landslide.
- On November 30, 1977, the Tuve landslide in western Sweden killed 9 people and destroyed 67 houses.
- Another famous flow of quick clay in Rissa Municipality, Norway, in 1978 caused about 33 hectares (82 acres) of farmland to liquefy and flow into the lake Botn over a few hours, with the loss of one life. The Rissa slide was well recorded by local citizens and a documentary film was made about it in 1981. The Norwegian Geotechnical Institute maintains the official copy of this documentary film.
- On 11 May 2010, quick clay took the lives of a family living in Saint-Jude, Quebec, when the land their house was built on suddenly tumbled down toward the Salvail River. The landslide was so sudden that the family members died where they sat; they had been watching an ice hockey game on television. The slide took out a portion of rural road which took a year to reinstate.
- On 2 February 2015, a landslide collapsed a pillar on the Skjeggestad Bridge in South-East Norway. The landslide was caused by nearby earthworks.
- On 3 June 2020, eight buildings were swept into the sea by a landslide in Kråkneset in Alta Municipality in Norway. The landslide was filmed by a resident. There were no casualties, and a dog was rescued from the sea.
- On 30 December 2020, part of a housing area was swept away by a landslide in the village of Ask in Gjerdrum Municipality in Norway, about 25 kilometres (16 mi) northeast of the capital Oslo. The 300-by-700-metre (980 ft × 2,300 ft) quick clay landslide wrecked several houses and killed 10 people.
- On 23 September 2023, near the town of Stenungsund, Sweden, an area of c. 15 hectares (37 acres) was affected by a quick clay landslide, which among other things damaged the E6 motorway between Gothenburg and Oslo.
- On 30 August 2025, the western Nesvatnet lakeshore collapsed in Levanger Municipality, in Trøndelag county, in Norway. This landslide, most likely caused by quick clay, has left a big gap in the new E6 road, the old E6 road and the railway track Nordlandsbanen, between Åsen and Levanger, 63km (39 miles) northeast of Trondheim. One Danish railroad worker was reported missing and likely lost his life in the landslide.

These landslides are retrogressive, meaning they usually start at water, and progress upwards at slow walking speed, although particularly deep quick clay layers on sloped regions may collapse much more rapidly, or in very large chunks that can slide at great speed due to the liquid nature of the disturbed clay. They have been known to penetrate kilometers inland, and consume everything in their path.

In modern times, areas known to have quick clay deposits are commonly tested in advance of any major human development. It is not always possible to entirely avoid building on a quick clay site, although modern engineering techniques have found technical precautions which can be taken to mitigate the risk of disaster. For example, when Ontario's Highway 416 had to pass through a quick clay deposit near Nepean, lighter fill materials such as polystyrene were used for the road bed, vertical wick drains were inserted along the route and groundwater cutoff walls were built under the highway to limit water infiltration into the clay.

== See also ==
- Clay chemistry
- Clay-water interaction
- Critical state soil mechanics
- DLVO theory, model for aggregation of aqueous dispersions
- Effective stress
- Electrical double layer, (EDL)
- Geomechanics
- Interface and colloid science
- Non-Newtonian fluid
- Quicksand
- Screening effect
- Shear strength (soil)
- Shielding effect
- Terzaghi's principle
- Urban Search and Rescue

== In popular culture ==
- The 1967 novel Landslide by Desmond Bagley, tells the story of a quick-clay landslide in Canada. The book was also adapted into a 1992 television film by the same name, directed by Jean-Claude Lord, and starring Anthony Edwards.
