= Arne Roy Walther =

Norwegian diplomat

Arne Roy Walther (born 21 June 1946) is a Norwegian diplomat.

He started working for the Norwegian Ministry of Foreign Affairs in 1971. He was the Norwegian ambassador to India from 1994 to 1999, and to Austria from 2002 to 2003. He was the secretary general of the International Energy Forum from 2004 to 2009, and Norwegian ambassador to Japan from 2009.

While he was stationed in India, he met the journalist Anita Pratap, whom he later married in 1999. This is the second marriage for both of them.

Diplomatic posts
Preceded by Jon Atle Gaarder	Norwegian ambassador to India; 1994–1999	Succeeded by Truls Hanevold
