= 2020 Gjerdrum landslide =

Quick clay landslide disaster in Norway

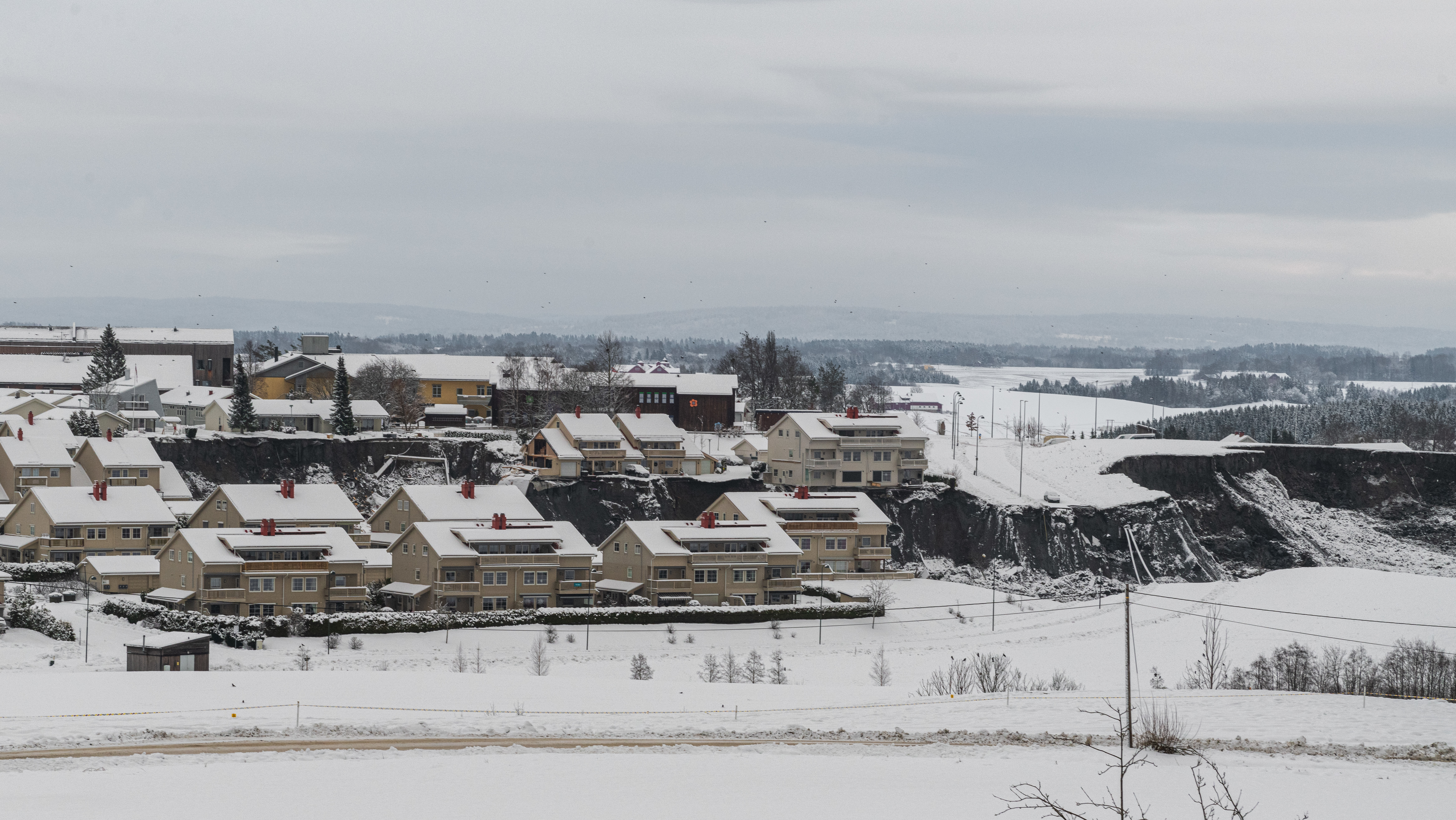
- Nystulia at the top of the landslide
- Date: 30 December 2020
- Time: c. 3:45–4:00 AM (CET (GMT+1))
- Location: Ask village, Akershus, Norway; 60°03′54″N 11°02′13″E
- Type: Landslide, quick clay slide
- Outcome: Several buildings destroyed, about 1000 people evacuated
- Deaths: 10
- Injuries: 10

Extent of the landslide (red).

The 2020 Gjerdrum landslide was a quick clay landslide that occurred in the early hours of 30 December 2020 at Ask village, the administrative centre of Gjerdrum, Norway. It spanned a flow off area of 300 by 700 metres (980 by 2,300 ft) and additionally affected 9 hectares (22 acres) by debris flow. Several buildings were destroyed, most of them houses and apartment buildings.

As of 22 March 2021, ten people had been confirmed killed by the landslide.

In 2022, the police charged Gjerdrum Municipality. The causes of the landslide [... had by 2022 been] investigated by police; another investigation, tasked with finding – prior to August 2021 – the causes of the landslide, will be performed by a group of experts.

== Background ==
There have previously been landslides in Gjerdrum municipality. During the night between 20 and 21 October 1924, a landslide destroyed several farms and damaged 1600 metres of road. In 1973 there was a landslide at Ask. A 1980 landslide was near the south end of the 2020 landslide. In 2014, a landslide destroyed two houses.

In July 2008, an article published in Romerikes Blad stated that hydrologist and geologist Steinar Myrabø had warned the municipality of soil erosion and the potential risk of a landslide, calling for a halt in construction at Nystulia on behalf of Norwegian Society for the Conservation of Nature's local chapter. In November 2020 a hiking path was constructed 150 m westwards of the later slide area. The photos of heavy machinery initiated public concern. But the path and the slide area are separated by two small ridges and the Fjelstadbekken stream.

According to the broadcaster NRK, intense rain in the days before the incident may have caused soil movements in the area. The Nannestad municipality next to Gjerdrum evacuated a hamlet on 15 December 2020 after a small landslide nearby.

== Search and recovery operations ==
The first reports of the landslide were made at 3:51 am on 30 December 2020. 10 people were injured, with 26 initially reported missing, though it was later determined that the actual number of missing persons was 10.

On New Year's Day, assistance from Sweden was requested; a 14-person Urban Search and Rescue team from Sweden worked onsite, and was released the same evening after the arrival of additional Norwegian rescue personnel.

By 1 January 2021 details of the ten people missing were published by police. The same day, the first casualty was reported. Early on 2 January, the body of a second victim was found, and later that day two more people were found dead. On 3 January, three more people were found dead, bringing the death toll to seven. Three people still remained missing, with searches continuing.

On 5 January 2021 the Norwegian authorities stated they no longer held out any hope of finding further survivors. At that time, three people were still missing.

A video released by the police on 6 January shows a rescue helicopter over the landslide, searching for survivors. The video is recorded by a police helicopter, and from the communications one can hear how they are trying to guide the rescue helicopter to the potential survivors' location.

=== Victims ===
The names of the victims were made public on 1 January, with the permission of their families.

| Name | Age | Found |
|---|---|---|
| Eirik Grønolen | 31 | 1 Jan |
| Lisbeth Neraas | 54 | 2 Jan |
| Marius Brustad | 29 | 3 Jan |
| Bjørn-Ivar Grymyr Jansen | 40 | 2 Jan |
| Charlot Grymyr Jansen | 31 | 3 Jan |
| Alma Grymyr Jansen | 2 | 2 Jan |
| Irene Ruud Gundersen | 69 | 3 Jan |
| Ann-Mari Olsen-Næristorp | 50 | 12 Feb |
| Victoria Emilie Næristorp-Sørengen | 13 | 12 Feb |
| Rasa Lasinskiene | 49 | 22 Mar |

=== Search for presumed dead ===
On 5 January the police stated that they no longer held out any hope of finding more survivors, but would continue the search for the last three victims.

The same day the Norwegian Armed Forces and their equipment left the area, with only the Home Guard left on the scene till 12 January

The Norwegian Civil Defence terminated their mission on 15 January and a civilian security company continued to guard the affected areas.

After a two weeks break the search for the remaining missing victims continued from 18 January.

On 9 February 2021 two bodies were located by search teams searching for the three remaining missing victims.

On 22 March the last missing person was found.

== Mobilized resources ==
Several government and private organizations, military units and volunteer organizations were involved in the search and recovery operation:

=== Emergency Services ===
- Upper Romerrike fire and rescue – Initial responding force. Later relieved by other agencies.
- Lower Romerrike fire and rescue – Close partners with Upper Romerrike fire and rescue. Responded with mutual aid to the landslide area.
- Oslo Fire and Rescue service – Initial USAR crews, accompanied by emergency medical services and Police.
- Trøndelag Fire and Rescue service – Secondary USAR forces. Relieved the Swedish USAR squad on arrival.
- Bergen Fire and Rescue service – Secondary USAR forces.

=== Government agencies ===
- Norwegian Civil Defence – Shelters for HQ and SAR organization, logistics, vehicles and establishing temporary water and sewage lines in the affected areas.
- Norwegian Water Resources and Energy Directorate – Ground and avalanche analysis, professional advice to the police
- Swedish Civil Contingencies Agency – USAR team

=== Private organizations ===
- Norwegian Geotechnical Institute – Geology expertise.
- Multiconsult – Ground and avalanche analysing.
- Andøya Space – Aerea surveillance and production of dronedata to rescue coordinators.

=== Volunteer organizations ===
- Regional Red Cross units – Evacuation of residents, volunteer ambulances and organizing of evacuation centers.
- Norwegian People's Aid – Volunteer ambulances, evacuation of a nursing home, vehicles, organizing of evacuation centers.
- Norwegian Rescue Dog Association – 28 K9 units on standby.
- Norwegian Radio Relay League – Organizing of signals and communication.

=== Norwegian armed forces ===
- Engineer battalion – Leguan bridge layer, ground strengthening system and support for SAR crews in the disaster area.
- Norwegian Home Guard – Guarding of the disaster perimeter.
- Special Operations Commando – Drone search and organizing of airspace.
- 330 Squadron – Rescue helicopters (Sea King and SAR Queen).
- 333 Squadron – P-3C Orion reconnaissance aircraft, initial search of disaster area.
- 339 Special Operations Aviation Squadron – Two Bell 412 helicopters, search and rescue and personnel transport.
- Intelligence Battalion – Image analysing of drone photos.

== Aftermath ==
The Nannestad and Gjerdrum Red Cross received large amounts of donations of toys, clothing, and hygiene products for the survivors of the landslide.

Following the disaster, several news outlets revealed that the affected area had been designated as a high-risk area for landslides as early as 2005 and that it was scheduled for a new evaluation in 2021 due to the increased amount of housing and construction projects in the area.

Several experts and engineers later criticized the Norwegian national government as well as local government for not taking high-risk areas seriously and allowing housing projects to continue despite having "clear instructions of how to deal with these areas for over fifty years."

== Reactions ==
Prime Minister Erna Solberg visited the affected area on 31 December 2020, and King Harald V dedicated parts of his New Year's Speech to those affected by the disaster.

The King of Sweden, Carl XVI Gustaf, also publicly expressed his sympathies the following day. The President of Finland Sauli Niinistö and the Prime Minister Sanna Marin also expressed their condolences to the Norwegian government and people.

On 3 January 2021, King Harald V, Queen Sonja and Crown Prince Haakon visited the disaster area to speak with rescuers, volunteers, evacuees and their relatives.

== See also ==
- List of landslides
- Tafjord rockslide
