= Anita Pratap =

Indian writer and journalist

- Born: 23 December 1958 (age 67); Kottayam, Kerala, India
- Occupations: Journalist, writer
- Spouse(s): Pratap Chandran (divorced); Arne Roy Walther (1999–present)
- Children: Zubin (son)
- Website: www.anitapratap.com

Anita Pratap (born 23 December 1958) is an Indian writer and journalist. In 1983, she was the first journalist who interviewed LTTE chief V. Prabhakaran. She won the George Polk award for TV reporting for her television journalism related to the takeover of Kabul by the Taliban. She was India bureau chief for CNN. She has written the book Island of Blood based on Sri Lanka. In 2013 she was presented with the Shriratna award by the Kerala Kala Kendram an organisation associated to the Kerala Sangeetha Nataka Akademi. She was nominated as the Aam Aadmi Party candidate from Ernakulam, Kerala, for the 2014 Lok Sabha elections.

== Early life ==
Pratap was born in Kottayam, Kerala, in a Syro Malabar Catholic family. Her father was employed with a Tata Group enterprise, he was posted at different locations in India taking his family with him. As a child Pratap changed seven schools in eleven years. She passed Senior Cambridge from a Loreto School Kolkata and did her BA – English from Miranda House, New Delhi, in 1978 and diploma in journalism from Bangalore University.

== Career ==
After completing her diploma in journalism, Pratap was recruited by Arun Shourie, the then editor of The Indian Express in Delhi. She then transferred to Bangalore to live with her parents. Shortly after, she joined Sunday Magazine. Her interest in journalism was in international politics and that led her to the ethnic conflicts in Sri Lanka. She visited many sites to gather first-hand information. In 1983, she interviewed Liberation Tigers of Tamil Eelam's (LTTE) chief Velupillai Prabhakaran. This became the first ever interview Prabhakaran gave to the world in which he talked about his philosophies of establishing LTTE, of taking matters in his own hands rather than relying on government and of his plans ahead. Anita was immediately recognised on an international level. She continued her work in Sri Lanka and later in 2003 published her first book Island of Blood about her experiences of living in a terror-stricken areas.

Pratap also worked for India Today and then was a correspondent for Time magazine for eight years. Post 1993-bombings in Bombay (now Mumbai), she also interviewed Bal Thackeray for Time; he was the then the chief of Shiv Sena which was the leading opposition party in Maharashtra. In 1996, she joined CNN, her first experience as a television journalist. She worked from the Atlanta and the Bangkok bureaus for a short while to get experience. She then covered news on the Taliban's takeover of Kabul for which she was presented with the George Polk Award.

Switching to television from print media, Pratap also made various documentaries on social issues and arts. In Light Up the Sky, she showcases the transformation of insurgent Mizoram into a democratic state. Her documentary, Orphans of an Ancient Civilization, notes the plights of craftsmen and When The Soul Glows documents folk dance traditions. The Shabash Hallelujah was a documentary on the Naga Regiment. Co-authoring with a Bangalore-based photographer Mahesh Bhatt, she published her second book Unsung in 2007 which told stories of nine ordinary Indian people who served society.

== Awards and honours ==
- 1997 – George Polk Award
- 1997 – Eminent Indian Award conferred by the Indo-American Society
- 1998 – Chameli Devi Jain Award for Outstanding Woman Media Person
- 2010 – "Noble Laureate" as Media Citizen by Karmaveer Puraskaar

== Personal life ==
Her first marriage was to Pratap Chandran, and she has a son Zubin from that relationship, born when she was 22 years old. Pratap Chandran was a senior reporter at The Indian Express where the two met. She subsequently divorced Chandran and took custody of her son. In 1999, she married Arne Roy Walther, a Norwegian diplomat. This is also Walther's second marriage.

== Popular culture ==
The character of Jaya, played by Nargis Fakhri in the 2013 Bollywood thriller, Madras Cafe is modelled on Anita Pratap. In the film, Jaya interviews LTF leader Anna Bhaskaran, who is in turn, modelled on Velupillai Prabhakaran.

== Works ==
Books

- Island of Blood: Frontline Reports from Sri Lanka, Afghanistan and Other South Asian Flashpoints ISBN 0142003662
- Unsung ISBN 8190453505, co-authored with Mahesh Bhatt, a documentary and editorial photographer based in Bangalore. (Not to be confused with Hindi feature film director Mahesh Bhatt.)

Documentaries

- Orphans of an Ancient Civilization
- Light Up the Sky
- Shabash Hallelujah
- When the Soul Glows
