= Markvard Sellevoll =

Norwegian geophysicist (1923–2020)

Markvard Armin Sellevoll (14 November 1923 – 22 March 2020) was a Norwegian geophysicist.

He was born in Alversund. He worked as a docent in seismology at the University of Bergen from 1961 to 1975, and professor from 1975 to 1990. He was among the people who established NORSAR. He was a member of the Norwegian Academy of Science and Letters. He died in 2020.
