= Geir Finne =

Norwegian politician (1948–2020)

Geir Finne (10 May 1948 – 21 October 2020) was a Norwegian politician for the Centre Party.

He was born in Bergen and grew up in Kolvereid Municipality. Following education in Germany and the US he spent his professional career at the University of Tromsø. He wrote several books for the general market, including The Svalbard Passage (1981, with Tom Kirkwood) and Heroisk forræderi - den tyske militære motstandsbevegelsen mellom de allierte og Hitler (2019).

Finne was a member of the municipal council of Tromsø Municipality and served as a deputy representative to the Parliament of Norway from Troms during the term 1993–1997. On 1 February 1996 he resigned from the Centre Party and continued as an independent. In total he met during 3 days of parliamentary session. He later enrolled in the Coastal Party.

He died in Germany at the age of 72.
