= Torgeir Flatmark =

Norwegian biochemist (1931–2020)

Torgeir Flatmark (21 September 1931 – 22 May 2020) was a Norwegian biochemist.

He grew up in Dovre Municipality in Gudbrandsdal, Norway. He took his cand.med. degree at the University of Oslo in 1957 and his dr.med. degree at the same university in 1967. He was an associate professor at the University of Bergen from 1967, then docent and from 1974 professor.

He chaired the Norwegian Biochemical Society from 1980 to 1982 and was a delegate to the Federation of European Biochemical Societies from 1982 to 1990. He was a member of the Norwegian Academy of Science and Letters from 1999.
