= Jack Kramer (footballer) =

Norwegian footballer (1939–2020)

Personal information
- Date of birth: 17 December 1939
- Place of birth: Oslo, Norway
- Date of death: 11 February 2020 (aged 80)
- Position: Defender

Youth career
- Vålerenga

Senior career*
Years	Team	Apps	(Gls)
1957–1964	Vålerenga		

International career
1956–1957	Norway u-19	2	(0)
1958–1960	Norway u-21	9	(0)
1962	Norway B	1	(0)
1960–1964	Norway	7	(0)
- * Club domestic league appearances and goals

Jack Kramer (17 December 1939 – 11 February 2020) was a Norwegian football defender. He played for Vålerenga between 1957 and 1964 and represented Norway as a youth, under-21 and senior international.
