= Arne Helvik =

Norwegian politician (1926–2020)

Arne Helvik (10 April 1926 – 25 August 2020) was a Norwegian air traffic controller and politician for the Labour Party.

He was born in Hetland Municipality. After finishing his secondary elution and compulsory military service in 1946 and 1947 he became an air traffic controller assistant at Sola Airport in 1948. After taking education in the United Kingdom he was an air traffic controller at Bodø Airport from 1953, Ørland Airport from 1954 and Sola Airport from 1955.

He was a member of the municipal council of Sola Municipality from 1959 to 1967 and 1971 to 1975 and Rogaland county council from 1963 to 1967 and 1975 to 1979. He also chaired Sola Labour Party and was a board member of Rogaland Labour Party from 1967 to 1978, the last four years as deputy chair.

He served as a deputy representative to the Parliament of Norway from Rogaland during the term 1969–1973. In total he met during 118 days of parliamentary session.
