= Ivar Asheim =

Norwegian theologian (1927–2020)

Ivar Asheim (5 August 1927 – 11 December 2020) is a Norwegian theologian known for his early research into Christian education (from a Lutheran perspective) and later publications investigating the moral theology of Martin Luther, including its relation to Aristotelian virtue ethics.

Asheim earned his doctorate in theology in 1961 for thesis entitled Faith and Education according to Martin Luther, which explored the role of Luther's pedagogical thought in his theological programme. Since the publication of Religious Education: Interpretation, Education, and Upbringing in 1987, Asheim's works have focused on ethics.

The majority of Asheim's theological career has been passed at the MF Norwegian School of Theology. He was appointed to a senior lectureship there in 1963, a post he vacated to serve as director of the theological department at the Lutheran World Federation in Geneva from 1965 to 1970. In 1970 he returned to the School of Theology as Professor of Religious Education, and was appointed to the chair of Ethics in 1979, which he held until his retirement in 1994.

He is widely acknowledged as a prominent voice amongst the Norwegian theologians of the late twentieth century, serving in retirement as a Senior Researcher at the Research Council of Norway (1994–1997) and as the inaugural chairman of the Norwegian Church Doctrinal Commission (1987–1991). He has been a member of the Norwegian Academy of Science and Letters since 1980, and was elected to the Royal Norwegian Society of Sciences and Letters in 1995.

He was born in Vartdal and married Tora Raastad in 1957. They resided at Hosle. He died in December 2020.
