= Frank Nervik =

Norwegian footballer (1934–2020)

Personal information
- Date of birth: 21 June 1934
- Date of death: 12 January 2020 (aged 85)
- Position: Goalkeeper

Senior career*
| Years | Team | Apps | (Gls) |
- Brage
- Fredrikstad

International career
| 1959 | Norway B | 2 | (0) |
| 1959 | Norway | 1 | (0) |
- * Club domestic league appearances and goals

Frank Nervik (21 June 1934 – 12 January 2020) was a Norwegian football goalkeeper.

He grew up in Øya, Trondheim, and spent his career in SK Brage except for a tenure in Fredrikstad FK. In his older days he was a central member of Sjetne IL. In 1959 he was capped once for Norway and twice for Norway B.
