= Jon Atle Gaarder =

Norwegian diplomat (1934–2020)

Jon Atle Gaarder (27 November 1934 – 14 March 2020) was a Norwegian diplomat.

Gaarder was born in Årnes in the county of Hedmark in Norway and grew up in Skarnes. He attended the Norwegian Military Academy, and was an active military officer before joining the foreign service in 1962. He was a counsellor for the Norwegian delegation to NATO from 1975 to 1979. In 1984 he was appointed as the Norwegian ambassador to Saudi Arabia, and he also represented Norway in the United Arab Emirates, Yemen and Oman. In 1990 he became the Norwegian ambassador to India, with additional representation in Sri Lanka, Bangladesh, Bhutan, Nepal and the Maldives. He left in 1994, and in 1996 he became the Norwegian ambassador to the Federal Republic of Yugoslavia, with additional representation in Bulgaria, Republic of Macedonia and Albania. From 1999 to 2001 he was the Norwegian ambassador to Lithuania.

He was decorated as a Commander of the Royal Norwegian Order of St. Olav.

Diplomatic posts
Preceded by Kåre Dæhlen	Norwegian ambassador to India; 1990–1994	Succeeded by Arne Roy Walther
