= Gerd Thoreid =

Norwegian singer and stand-up comedian (1924–2020)

Gerd Miriam Thoreid
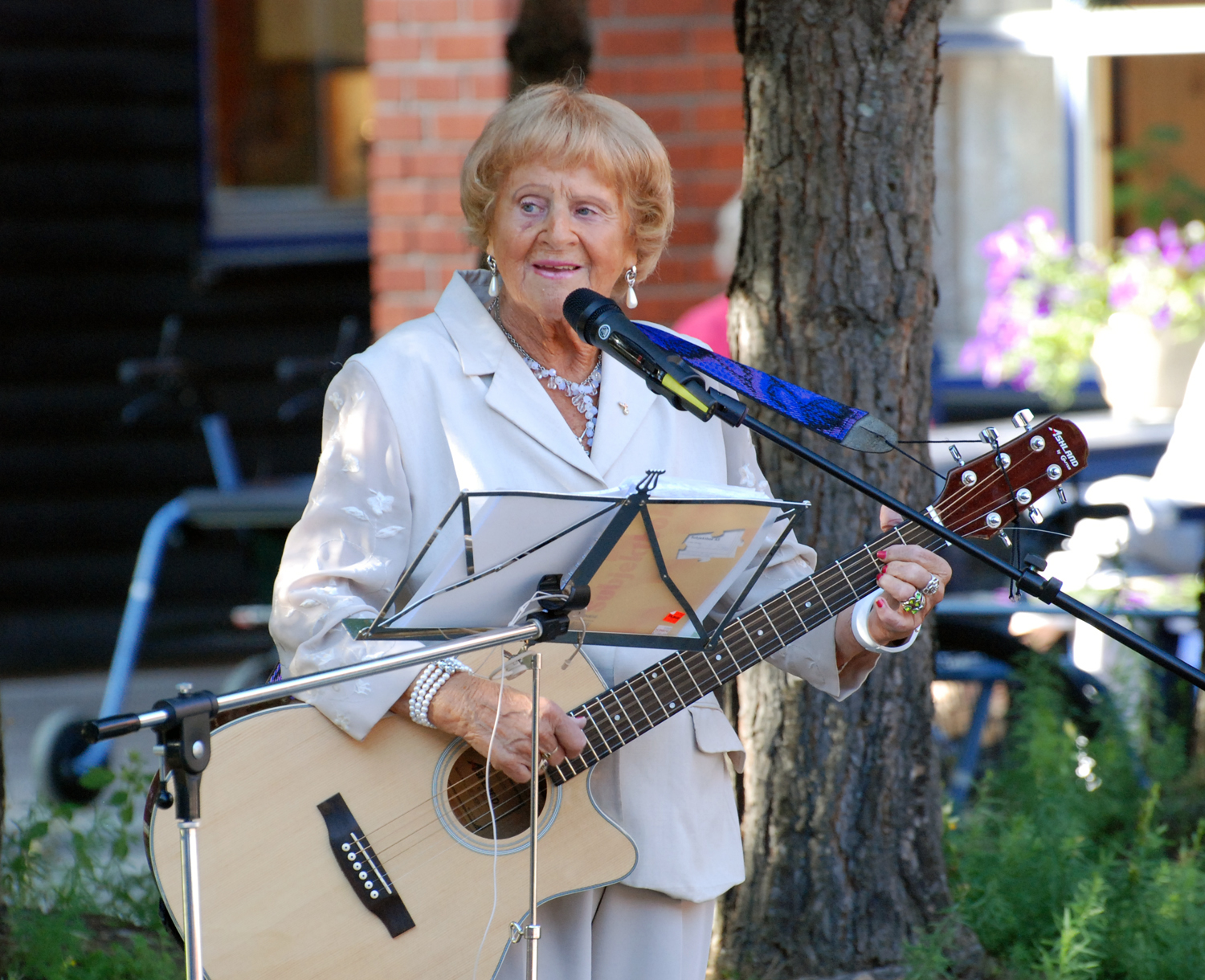
- Gerd Thoreid performing in Hamar in 2009
- Born: 17 September 1924; Hamar
- Died: 14 November 2020 (aged 96); Kongsvinger
- Other name: GT-Sara
- Citizenship: Norway
- Occupation: Singer
- Notable work: stand-up comedian

Gerd Miriam Thoreid née Hernamsen, widely known by her stage name GT-Sara, (1924–2020) was a Norwegian singer who is remembered as her country's oldest stand-up comedian. In 2007, aged 83, she recorded the top-listed GT-Sara på farten becoming the oldest performer in Norway to launch a debut album. Thoreid was still performing enthusiastically when she was 90.

== Early life and family ==
Born in Furnes Municipality near Hamar on 17 September 1924, Gerd Miriam Hermansen was the daughter of Andreas Hermansen and his wife Laura née Nilsene. She first married the electrician Eilert Anton Pedersen (died 1956) with whom she had a daughter, Ann-Karin. She later married Hans Jacob Thoreid (1932–2009).

== Career ==
The first of her many appearances on television was in 1975 although she regretted not having become an entertainer earlier. She became known for her warmth and laughter as well as her guitar. Often telling rather coarse jokes, she never lost faith in God. GT-Sara was considered to be Norway's oldest stand-up comic. In 2007, when she was 83, she published her first album GT-Sara på farten med Full Rulle, becoming the country's oldest performer to launch a debut album. On the occasion of her 90th birthday, she said she still felt young and active and was certainly not interested in becoming a pensioner.

Despite her poor health, GT-Sara held her annual concert at the festival in Lillestrøm as recently as June 2019. She also appeared on TV2 at her old people's centre in September 2020.

Gerd Thoreid died in Kongsvinger on 14 November 2020 where she had been hospitalized after a fall.
