= Hans Eriksen =

Norwegian politician (1936–2020)

Hans Johannes Andreas Eriksen (Northern Sami: Erkke Hánssa Hánsa) (27 March 1936 – 1 October 2020) was a Norwegian Sámi, teacher, principal, radio broadcaster, politician, Sami language advocate, and member of the Progress Party (FrP). Eriksen served as an elected member of the Sámi Parliament of Norway from 2009 until 2013. He was also a longtime leader of the Norwegian Sámi Association during the 1980s and 1990s. In addition to his career in politics and education, Eriksen was the former head of NRK Sámi Radio, which is now known as NRK Sápmi. He served as the radio manager of NRK Sámi Radio from 1979 to 1980.

== Biography ==
Eriksen was originally from the village of Sirbmá, Finnmark. Earlier in his life and career, Eriksen spent many years as a teacher, principal and headmaster at a primary school in Karasjok. Eriksen began his political career as a municipal council representative in Tana Municipality and a member of the Finnmark county council for the FrP party.

Hans Eriksen died on 1 October 2020 at the age of 84.
