= Jan Berg (politician) =

Norwegian politician (1941–2020)

Jan Berg (26 March 1941 – 19 July 2020) was a Norwegian typographer, trade unionist and politician for the Labour Party.

He was born in Oslo as a son of a painter. He started a typographer's apprenticeship in 1956 and worked as such through 1986, following the technical advancements in his field. From 1987 to 2003 he was a vocational teacher at Sogn Upper Secondary School, having undertaken brief studies in pedagogy.

Berg was a member of Oslo school board from 1976 to 1979 and Oslo city council from 1979 to 1983. He served as a deputy representative to the Parliament of Norway from Oslo during the terms 1973–1977, 1977–1981 and 1981–1985. From 1979 to 1981 he was a regular representative, covering for Einar Førde while Førde was a member of Nordli's Cabinet.

As a trade unionist he was the local union chair at Grøndahl & Søn from 1963, advancing to board membership in the Norwegian Graphical Union from 1971 to 1979. He was a board member of Oslo Labour Party from 1976 to 1977 and sat on several of the party's policy committees. He was also a board member of Sofienberg Upper Secondary School from 1977 to 1980, and supervisory council member of Kjøbmandsbanken, Oslo Sparebank and ABC-bank.
