= Inger Lise Nyberg =

Norwegian politician (1942–2020)

Inger Lise Nyberg (30 November 1942 – 1 September 2020) was a Norwegian politician for the Conservative Party.

She was a deputy representative to the Parliament of Norway from Sør-Trøndelag during the term 1985–1989. In total she met during 17 days of parliamentary session.

She was also a board member of Folketrygdfondet from 1990 to 1994.
