= Tom Hagen (businessman) =

Norwegian businessman (born 1950)

Tom Hagen (born 14. April 1950) is a Norwegian businessman. In 1992, he co-founded Elkraft AS, an electric company. Hagen works in property development. The financial magazine Kapital lists him as Norway's 172nd richest person.

His wife, Anne-Elisabeth Falkevik Hagen, was supposedly kidnapped on 31 October 2018 and has not been seen since. The suspected kidnappers demanded a nine million euro ransom paid in the cryptocurrency Monero. In June 2019, Norwegian police said that they could not rule out that the alleged abduction had simply been a cover for her death.

On 28 April 2020, he was arrested and charged with murder, or complicity to murder his wife. However, he was released shortly after he was arrested, though he was still a suspect until 18 October 2024, when the charges were dismissed with the Norwegian dismissal code "intet straffbart forhold anses bevist" (no criminal offense considered proven). This code means the evidence indicated that no criminal offence had been committed and differs from a dismissal due to lack of evidence.
