= Terje Meyer =

Norwegian industrial designer (1942–2020)

- Born: 13 February 1942; Oslo, Norway
- Died: 26 January 2020 (aged 77); Stabekk, Norway
- Known for: Industrial design
- Movement: Scandinavian Modern
- Awards: 1st Prize, Anniversary competition held by Norwegian Federation of Interior and Furniture designers: Housing for the Future; 1st Prize, the Competition for Fittings and Fixtures for Children, the Disabled and the Elderly (Norway); 1st prize in the Branch Council's furniture competition; 1st prize in the Competition for Bicycle Design held by the Japan Industrial Promotion Organization; two 3rd prizes in Sørlie møblers anniversary competition; The Brunel Award1987 Vienna, for his medium distance train; The Brunel Award 1989 Utrecht, for his sleeping car; The Brunel Award 1994 Washington for his Intercity-train

Terje Meyer (13 February 1942 – 26 January 2020) was a Norwegian industrial designer. He designed a wide range of products for very different purposes; electronics, fittings, office furniture, farm machinery, household appliances, details for interiors and comprehensive systems in the genre labeled "Public design". More than 90 items are clearly distinguishable as "Meyer designs".

== Education ==
Meyer was largely self-educated in his field, but received a diploma in Arts and Crafts in 1965 from SHKS in Oslo, Norway.

== Career ==
He developed an interest in industrial design at an early stage of his career. Sonce he wad one of the outstanding figures in his profession, with a reputation for his ability to innovate.

In his creative work on constructions he encroached on territory which is usually regarded as the sole preserve of the engineer. This "intrusion" is especially evident in a series of new agricultural machines which are currently being developed, and which feature several innovations, in particular a new approach to the relationship between man and machine.

He also happened to have a keen interest in new forms of housing.

Terje Meyer's skills were in high demand also at organizational level, and he held a number of important positions, including board membership of international bodies.

Meyer served as:

- chairman of the Norwegian Society of Industrial Designers, 1976–80
- board member of the Norwegian Society of Crafts and Design, 1976–77
- board member of ICSID International Council of Societies of Industrial design, 1981–85
- member of the Norwegian Industrial Design Council, 1978–81
- member of the Granum Committee and the Owe Committee for the planning of education in industrial design in Norway

== Recognitions ==
- 1st Prize, Anniversary competition held by Norwegian Federation of Interior and Furniture designers: Housing for the Future
- 1st Prize, the Competition for Fittings and Fixtures for Children, the Disabled and the Elderly (Norway)
- 1st prize in the Branch Council's furniture competition
- 1st prize in the Competition for Bicycle Design held by the Japan Industrial Promotion Organization
- two 3rd prizes in Sørlie møblers anniversary competition.
- The Brunel Award1987 Vienna, for his medium distance train
- The Brunel Award 1989 Utrecht, for his sleeping car
- The Brunel Award 1994 Washington for his Intercity-train
