= Erik Tandberg (space educator) =

Norwegian engineer (1932–2020)

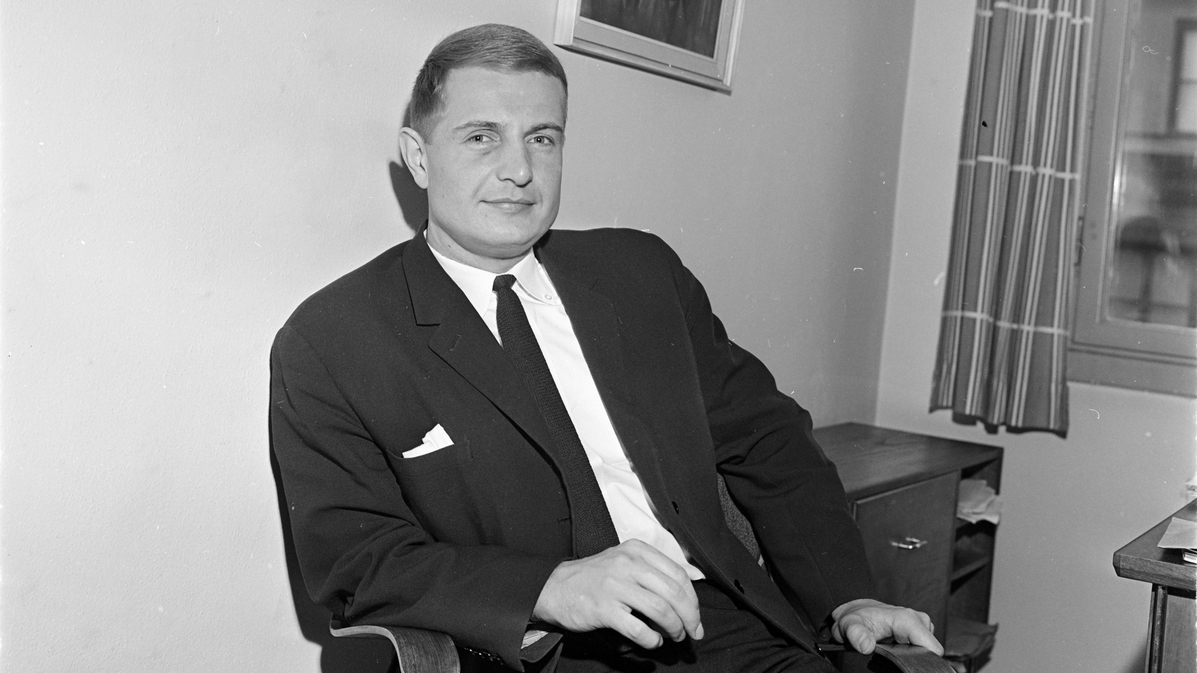
Engineer Erik Tandberg in 1964

Erik Tandberg (19 October 1932 – 2 May 2020) was a Norwegian engineer, author, television personality and space educator. He was born in Oslo, Norway. He was a master of science from Stanford University in 1959. He did his scholarship at Princeton University in the years 1964-65.

He became technical consultant on space matters at NRK from 1960.
From that time, he wrote several books and publications on space related subjects. He was a TV commentator at NRK on all Apollo program Moon landings, 1969-1972, together with Jan P. Jansen. In the decades thereafter, Tandberg was by far the most widely shown space expert on Norwegian television, at the same time doing a lot of public lectures on the subject.

He was connected to Norwegian Space Centre.

Tandberg was a member of the City Council of Oslo for the Conservative Party from 1969-89.

He died on 2 May 2020.
