= Kåre Dæhlen =

Norwegian diplomat (1926–2020)

Kåre Dæhlen (23 October 1926 – 23 May 2020) was a Norwegian diplomat.

He is a cand.philol. by education, and started working for the Norwegian Ministry of Foreign Affairs in 1954. He served as the Norwegian ambassador to Greece from 1974 to 1976, to Poland from 1981 to 1986, to India from 1986 to 1990 and to Austria from 1990 to 1994.

Diplomatic posts
Preceded by Tancred Ibsen, Jr.	Norwegian ambassador to India; 1986–1990	Succeeded by Jon Atle Gaarder
