= Bjørn Tysdahl =

Norwegian literary historian (1933–2020)

Bjørn Tysdahl (20 October 1933 – 17 December 2020) was a Norwegian literary historian.

He grew up in Kampen, Oslo. He took his education at the University of Oslo, from 1961 as a research fellow. Following the doctoral thesis Joyce and Ibsen: A Study in Literary Influence, he worked at the University of Sussex before becoming a professor of English literature at the University of Oslo. He was especially known for his biography on Oscar Wilde. He was a fellow of the Norwegian Academy of Science and Letters from 1988.

He resided at Hosle. He died in December 2020, aged 87.
