= Knut Rønningen =

Norwegian biotechnologist (1938–2020)

Knut Rønningen (20 July 1938 – 3 February 2020) was a Norwegian biotechnologist.

He was born in Tylldalen. He studied at the Norwegian College of Agriculture, Edinburgh and Cornell University, before finally taking his dr.agric. degree at the Norwegian College of Agriculture in 1970. He became a professor at the Swedish University of Agricultural Sciences in 1972, then at the Norwegian School of Veterinary Science in 1981. Here he also served as prorector from 1989 to 1995.

He was a member of the Norwegian Academy of Science and Letters from 1987. Among his board memberships, he chaired the board of Matforsk.
