= Egerton Capital =

British hedge fund

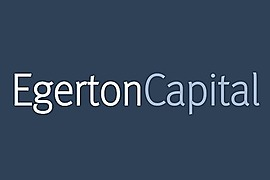
- Type: Employee-owned
- Founded: 1994; 32 years ago
- Founders: John Armitage, William Bollinger
- Headquarters: London, England
- AUM: US$16.3 billion (January 2023)
- Website: egertoncapital.com

Egerton Capital is a British hedge fund.

Egerton Capital was founded in 1994 by John Armitage and William Bollinger. Armitage is the chief investment officer and a co-founder.

As of November 2014, it had 23 employees. They are based at Stratton House, 5 Stratton Street, Mayfair, London, W1.

In the year to 31 March 2014, Egerton made a profit of £141.4 million, which was divided between its 12 partners.

As of 31 March 2019, Egerton had $19.8 billion in assets under management.
