= Ask, Akershus =

- Village
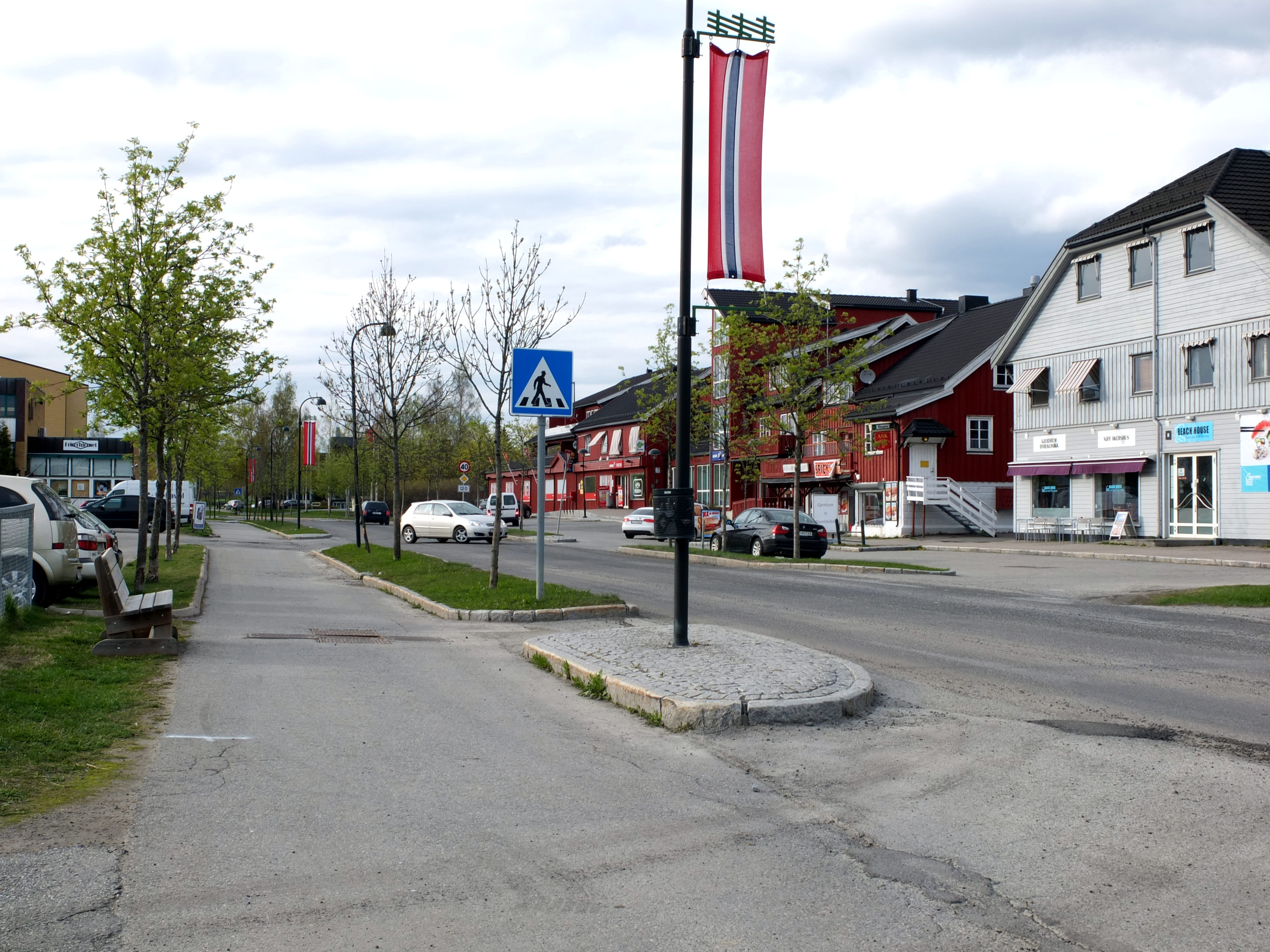
- Centre of Ask Village

- Location in Akershus
- Coordinates: 60°4′17″N 11°2′3″E
- Country: Norway
- Region: Østlandet
- County: Akershus
- Municipality: Gjerdrum
- Time zone: UTC+01:00 (CET)
  - Summer (DST): UTC+02:00 (CEST)

Ask is the administrative centre of Gjerdrum municipality, Norway. It is around 20 km north-east of Oslo. Its population is 6,890 as of 2020.

Ask contains a community centre, schools, kindergartens, a training centre, shops, a pub, restaurants and hotel, according to public information.

== Etymology ==
The centre is named after the old farm Ask. The farm name (Old Norse: Askr) means "ash tree".

== 2020 landslide ==
In the early hours of 30 December 2020 a quick clay landslide, leaving a crater measuring 300 by 700 meters, killed at least seven people, and injured many others, destroying several buildings.

As of Tuesday, 5 January 2021, Norwegian authorities stated their hopelessness of finding any more survivors. Three people were still missing since what has been remarked as "among the worst (landslides) in modern Norwegian history," which destroyed at least 9 buildings containing over 30 apartments, with at least 1,000 known evacuees evacuated out of the village of more than 6,000 residents.
