= Gjerdrum =

Gjerdrum Municipality Gjerdrum kommune
- Municipality
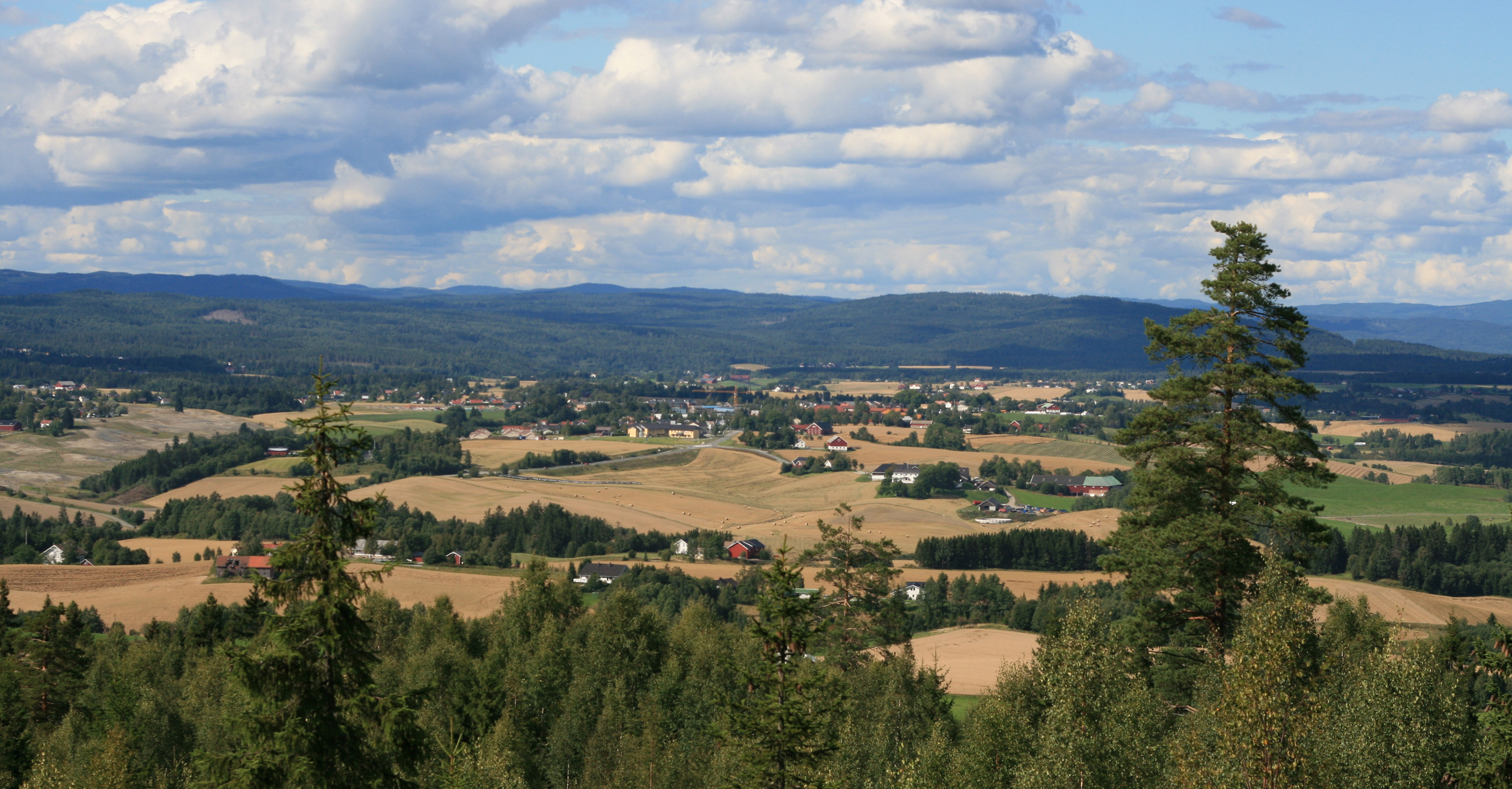

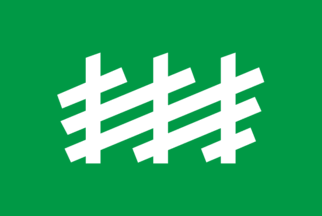
- Flag Coat of arms

- Akershus within Norway

- Gjerdrum within Akershus
- Coordinates: 60°4′57″N 11°0′52″E
- Country: Norway
- County: Akershus
- District: Romerike
- Administrative centre: Ask

Government
  - Mayor (2011): Anders Ostensen (Labor Party)

Area
  - Total: 83 km^{2} (32 sq mi)
  - Land: 82 km^{2} (32 sq mi)
  - Rank: #396 in Norway

Population (2013)
  - Total: 6,267
  - Rank: #192 in Norway
  - Density: 60/km^{2} (160/sq mi)
  - Change (10 years): ▲ +31.6%
- Demonym: Gjermsokning

Official language
  - Norwegian form: Bokmål
- Time zone: UTC+01:00 (CET)
  - Summer (DST): UTC+02:00 (CEST)
- ISO 3166 code: NO-3230
- Website: Official website

Gjerdrum (Norwegian: [ˈjæ̀rdrʉm]) is a municipality in Akershus county, Norway. It is part of the traditional region of Romerike.

Gjerdrum borders the municipalities of Nannestad, Nittedal, and Ullensaker, and Lillestrøm. The administrative centre of the municipality is the village of Ask.

== Name and coat of arms ==
The municipality (originally the parish) is named after the old Gjerdrum farm (Norse Gerðarvin). The first element is the genitive of a river name Gerð and the last element is vin 'meadow, pasture'. The river name is derived from the Norse word garðr meaning 'fence' and so the meaning is 'the river whose function is a fence (or as a border)'.

The coat of arms is from modern times. They were granted in 1993. The arms show a traditional Norwegian form of roundpole fence. The arms are also canting because the name of the municipality refers to a fence.

== History ==
Gjerdrum was established as a municipality on 1 January 1838 (see formannskapsdistrikt).

Store norske leksikon says that artefacts indicate that humans have lived in Gjerdrum since ancient times; furthermore the names of places also indicate the same.

=== 2020 landslide ===
On 30 December 2020 a quick clay landslide occurred in the village of Ask within Gjerdum municipality. 10 people died. The slide measured 700 by 300 metres (2,300 by 980 ft), injured 10 people (including one seriously), left 10 unaccounted for and led to 1,000 being evacuated from the village, with several homes having been destroyed in the slide.

== Geography ==
Gjerdrum lies on the southwestern part of the Romerike Plain (Romerikssletta); this eastern part of the municipality lies at a low altitude and is covered by significant layers of clay that was deposited, towards the end of the previous ice age.

The quick-clay at Gjerdrum was deposited (in a fjord) around 8,000 or 9,000 years ago, when the sea level was around 200 meters higher.

== Demographics ==
In 2021, 1258 inhabitants were immigrants or Norwegian-born to immigrant parents. 264 inhabitants had Polish parents or were Polish themselves; 173 had Lithuanian parents or were Lithuanian.

| Ancestry | Number |
|---|---|
| Poland | 264 |
| Lithuania | 173 |
| Sweden | 70 |
| Pakistan | 67 |
| Philippines | 56 |
| Iraq | 43 |
| Denmark | 35 |
| Thailand | 35 |
| Latvia | 34 |
| Syria | 30 |
| Trinidad and Tobago | 3 |

== Sports ==
The local sports team is Gjerdrum IL.

== People from Gjerdrum ==
- Christian Krohg (1777–1828) politician, cabinet member, MP
- Olaf Devik (1886 in Gjerdrum – 1987) meteorologist and physicist
- Daniel Franck (born 1974) a snowboarder, silver medallist in the men's halfpipe in the 1998 Winter Olympics
- Petter Fagerhaug (born 1997 in Gjerdrum) cross-country mountain biker
- Kristoffer Skjerping (born 1993) a former road racing cyclist, lives in Gjerdrum
- Helene Spilling (born 1996), a professional dancer

== Gallery ==
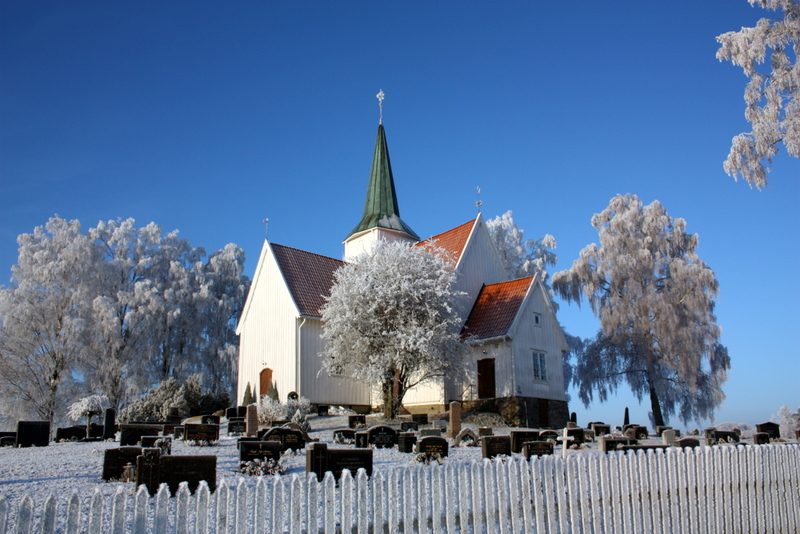
Gjerdrum kirke

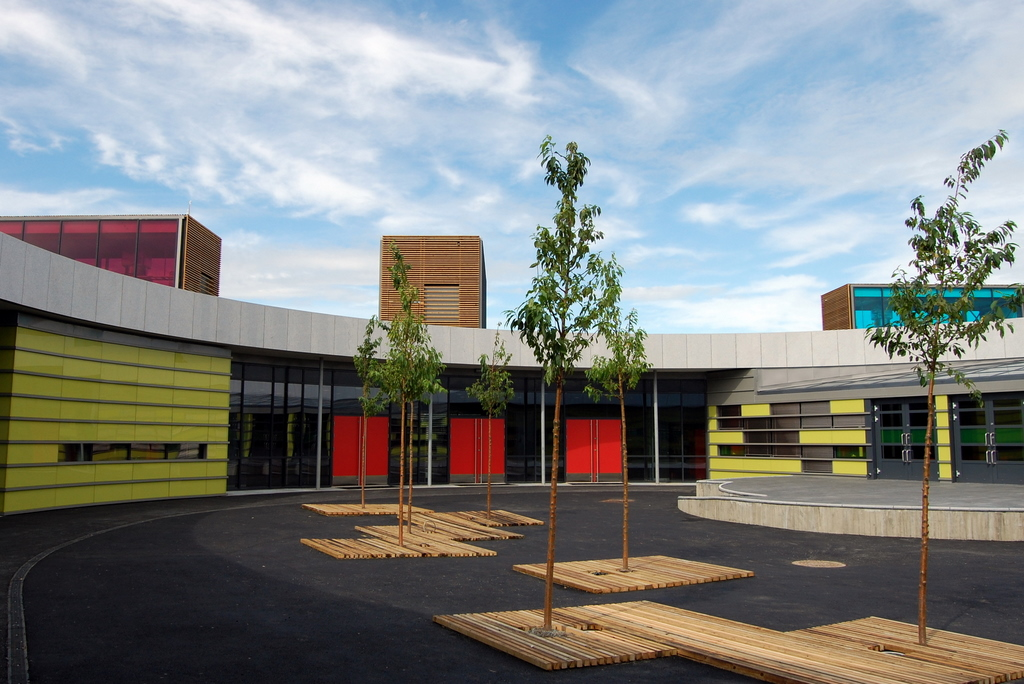
Gjerdrum ungdomsskole

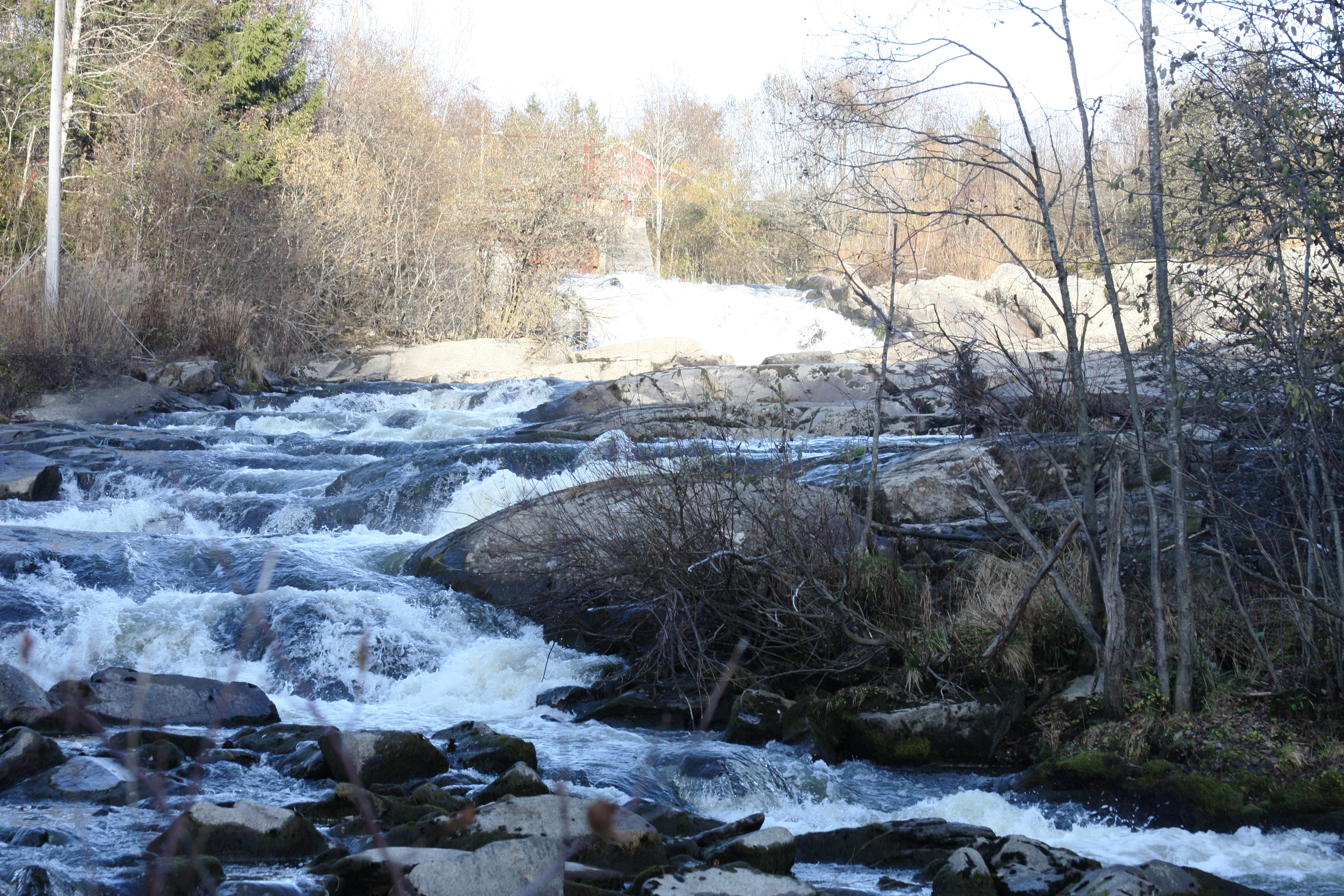
River Leira by Kråkfoss waterfalls
