= Urdevassfjell =

Mountain in Norway

- Location within Buskerud Location within Norway

Highest point
- Elevation: 958.5 m (3,145 ft)
- Coordinates: 60°23′38″N 9°55′42″E

Geography
- Location: Buskerud, Norway

Urdevassfjell is a mountain located in Ringerike in Buskerud, Norway. The mountain is part of the Ådalsfjella range. It is situated west of the north end of Høgfjell in Ådal and east of Eidvatnet in the village of Strømsoddbygda.
