= Tyristrand Church =

Church in Buskerud, Norway

- Tyristrand kirke
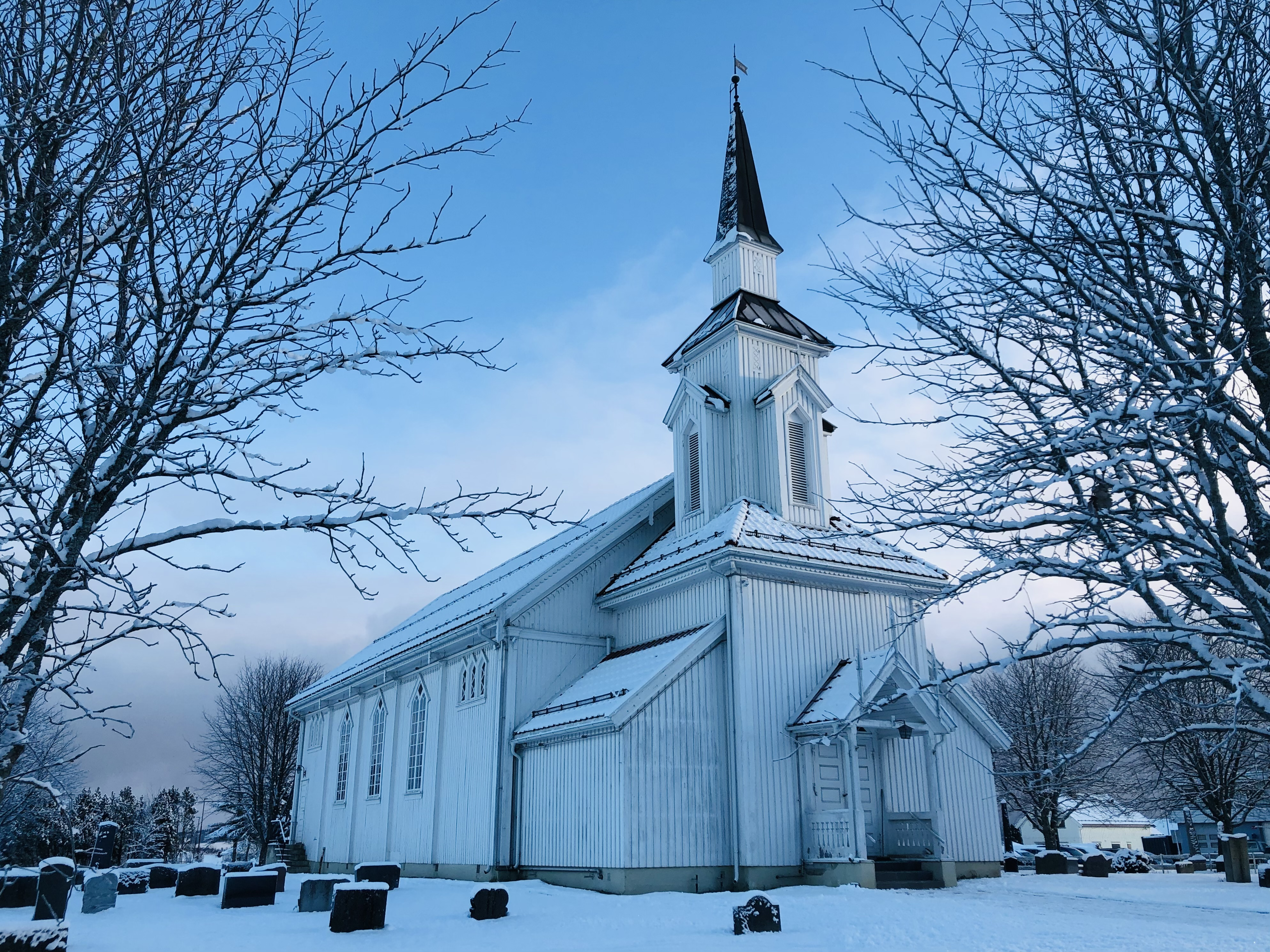
- View of the church
- Tyristrand Church
- 60°05′10″N 10°05′51″E
- Location: Ringerike, Buskerud
- Country: Norway
- Denomination: Church of Norway
- Churchmanship: Evangelical Lutheran

History
- Status: Parish church
- Founded: 1857
- Consecrated: 30 Sept 1857

Architecture
- Functional status: Active
- Architect: Christian H. Grosch
- Architectural type: Long church
- Completed: 1857 (169 years ago)

Specifications
- Capacity: 250
- Materials: Wood

Administration
- Diocese: Tunsberg
- Deanery: Ringerike prosti
- Parish: Tyristrand
- Norwegian Cultural Heritage Site
- Type: Church
- Status: Listed
- ID: 85695

Tyristrand Church (Norwegian: Tyristrand kirke) is a parish church of the Church of Norway in Ringerike Municipality in Buskerud county, Norway. It is located in the village of Tyristrand. It is the church for the Tyristrand parish which is part of the Ringerike prosti (deanery) in the Diocese of Tunsberg. The white, wooden church was built in a long church design in 1857 using plans drawn up by the architect Christian Heinrich Grosch. The church seats about 250 people.

== History ==
The church was designed by Christian H. Grosch and built by Peder N. Stiksrud and Ole N. Opsahl. It was consecrated on 30 September 1857. The church is a long church built out of log construction with paneling covering the log walls on both outside and inside. The style is neo-Gothic towards Swiss chalet style, and the church has a rectangular nave with a narrower choir surrounded by sacristies, so that the body of the building has an even width.

== Media gallery ==
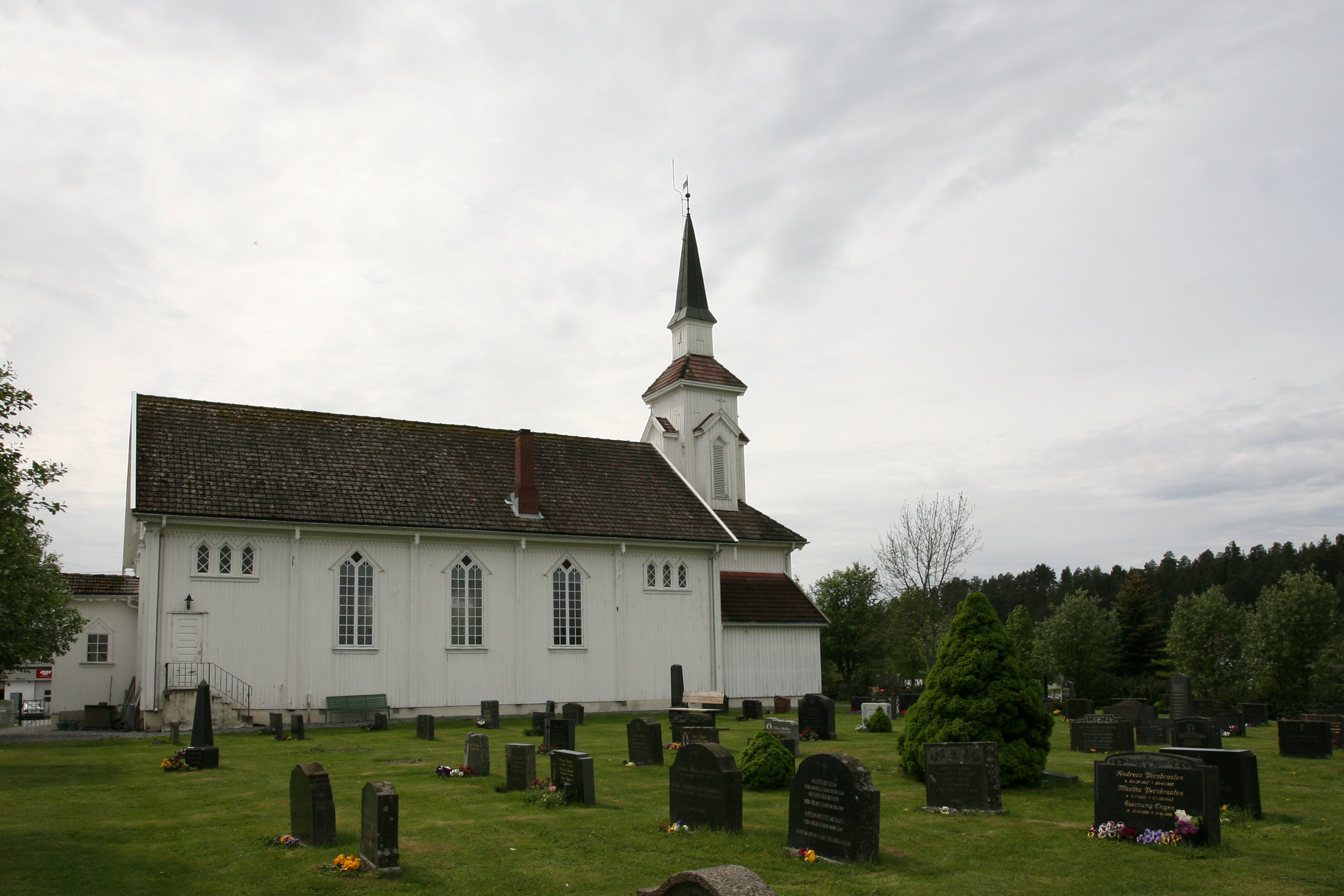

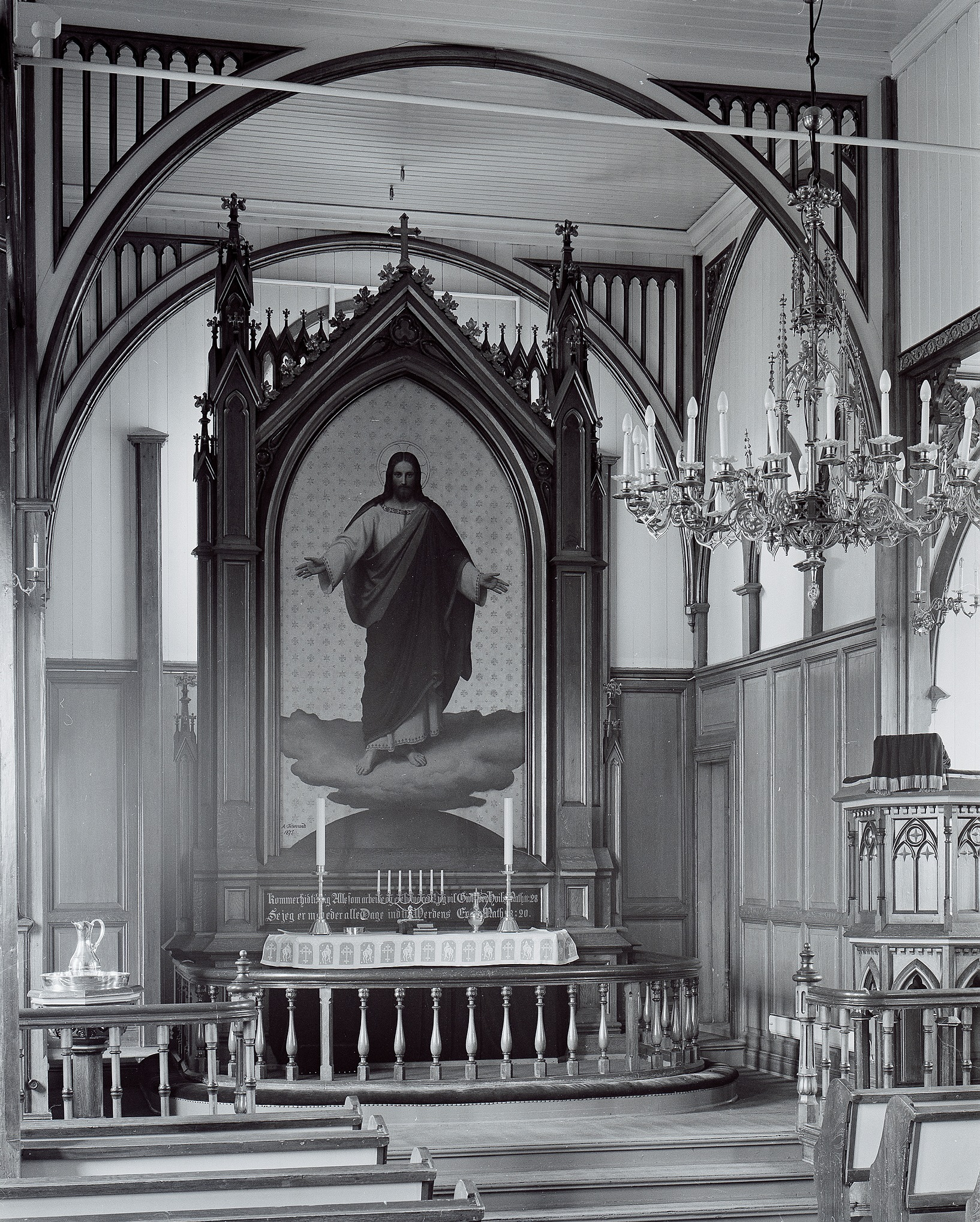

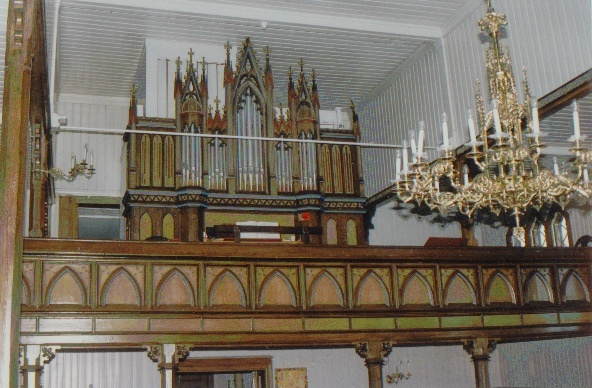

== See also ==
- List of churches in Tunsberg
