= Gallows Pine =

Pine tree in Ringerike, Norway

Coordinates: 60°08′43″N 10°16′30″E

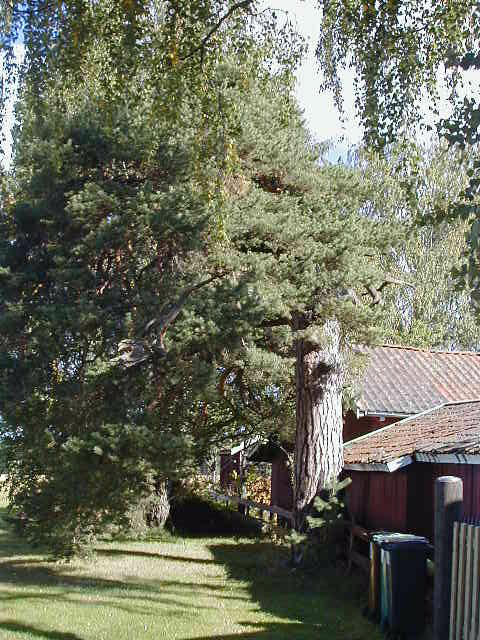
Galgefurua

The Gallows Pine (in Norwegian Galgefurua, also known as Signalfurua, Norwegian for the Signal Pine) is a pine at Tanbergmoen in Ringerike, Norway is a Scots pine tree. The approx. 400 years old tree is located just off the former military excursion site Jensebråten. It is about seven meters high and has a very crumpled appearance. There are several such large crumpled pine trees in the area, all of which are lush and probably very old. Up among the branches of the bile duct is a forged ring from the time when the pine was the site of executions for the district still visible. The pine tree is listed by the Norwegian Directorate for Cultural Heritage.

== History ==
In 1710 the execution site was established. Whether anyone has ever been executed by hanging from the tree is uncertain. It is unclear how many were executed there in the time that followed, but in the summer of 1778 there has been at least one episode that led to the execution. Dorte Nilsdatter gave birth to a child she later killed. She covered the dead body of the baby with a rock. However, the crime was discovered. She was sentenced to death by beheading under the tree and had to pay for the execution herself.

On August 13, 1805, there is also an execution there. Then the Swedish Peder Wallberg was sentenced to behead and burn for murder. He had murdered a mother and her six-year-old son. Around the tree, a military guard was set up.

The area by the execution site remained a site of military excerpt until the summer of 1868, when it was closed down.
