= Veme Træsliberi =

Norwegian wood pulp company

- Type: Wood-grinding mill
- Industry: Wood pulp
- Founded: 1874
- Defunct: 1888
- Fate: Destroyed by fire
- Headquarters: Ringerike, Buskerud, Norway
- Products: Wood pulp

Veme Træsliberi was a Norwegian wood-grinding mill that produced wood pulp in Ringerike municipality in Buskerud. It was founded in 1874 and operated until its closure in 1888.

== History ==
Wood pulp prices were favorable in the first half of the 1870s, driven up by the Franco-Prussian War of 1870–1871, which all but removed German wood pulp from the market. These prices encouraged the founding of several mills in the Drammen watercourse, and Veme Træsliberi was built in this first wave of mill foundings in Norway, when there were only 10 mills in Buskerud.

The mill's first owner was the forest owner Christian Oppen, from Norderhov in present-day Ringerike municipality. After he went bankrupt in 1880, the Hæhre brothers took over, and seven years later the mill passed to a partnership led by the consul general Christian Christophersen, one of the most influential figures in Norwegian business in the 1880s and 1890s, who had handled the company's foreign sales since 1875.

When the Franco-Prussian War ended and German pulp production resumed, more wood pulp came onto the market and prices fell. Producers cut prices, and many pulp factories eventually had to shut down. No new mills were built and few improvements were made to existing ones between 1875 and 1879, though Veme was modernized somewhat in 1877 and 1880.

In 1887, the year before closure, the mill had a capacity of 2,500 tonnes of wood pulp. Thirty men worked there permanently, and 330 horsepower drove the machinery. Its products were used among other things to make ornaments and ceiling rosettes.

The business lasted only 14 years. The mill was destroyed by fire in 1888 and closed, with no attempt made to rebuild it.

== Bibliography ==
- Johannesen, A. (1889). En historisk fremstilling ledsaget med statistiske opgaver og geografiske kart af de norske træsliberier ved udgangen af aaret 1887. Christiania, p. 15.
- Mikkelsen, Per R. (1975). Norsk tremasseindustri 1863–1895. En studie i et industrielt gjennombrudd, hovedoppgave i historie. Oslo, pp. 75, 223.
- Sætherskar, Johs., ed. (1951). Det norske næringsliv. Buskerud fylkesleksikon. Bergen, pp. 148–149.
