= Ullerål Church =

Church in Buskerud, Norway

- Ullerål kirke
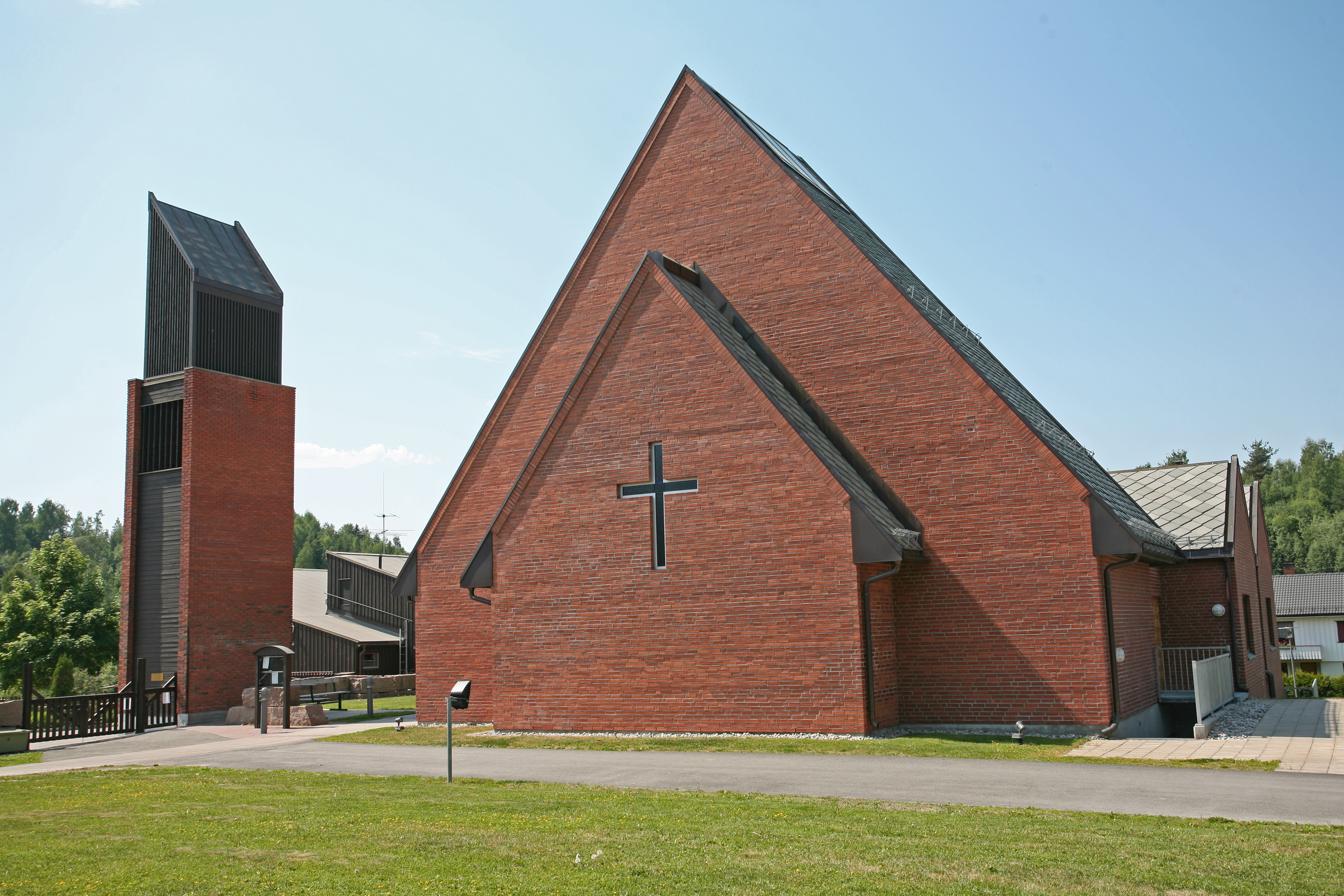
- View of the church
- Ullerål Church
- 60°10′49″N 10°15′30″E
- Location: Ringerike, Buskerud
- Country: Norway
- Denomination: Church of Norway
- Churchmanship: Evangelical Lutheran

History
- Status: Parish church
- Founded: 1984
- Consecrated: 25 March 1984

Architecture
- Functional status: Active
- Architect: Elisabet Fidjestøl
- Architectural type: Rectangular
- Completed: 1984 (42 years ago)

Specifications
- Capacity: 350
- Materials: Brick

Administration
- Diocese: Tunsberg
- Deanery: Ringerike prosti
- Parish: Ullerål

Ullerål Church (Norwegian: Ullerål kirke) is a parish church of the Church of Norway in Ringerike Municipality in Buskerud county, Norway. It is located in the town of Hønefoss. It is the church for the Ullerål parish which is part of the Ringerike prosti (deanery) in the Diocese of Tunsberg. The red brick church was built in a rectangular design in 1984 using plans drawn up by the architect Elisabet Fidjestøl. The church seats about 350 people.

== History ==
Ullerål Church is a modern-style church in a residential area in the Ullerål area in the north part of Hønefoss. It was designed by Elisabet Fidjestøl and the architectural firm Sæther & Gythfeldt (later SG arkitektur). The church was built in 1983-1984 and it was consecrated on 25 March 1984. Later, in 2003–2004, the church was enlarged. The new addition created a much larger building and it was consecrated on 28 November 2004.

== Media gallery ==
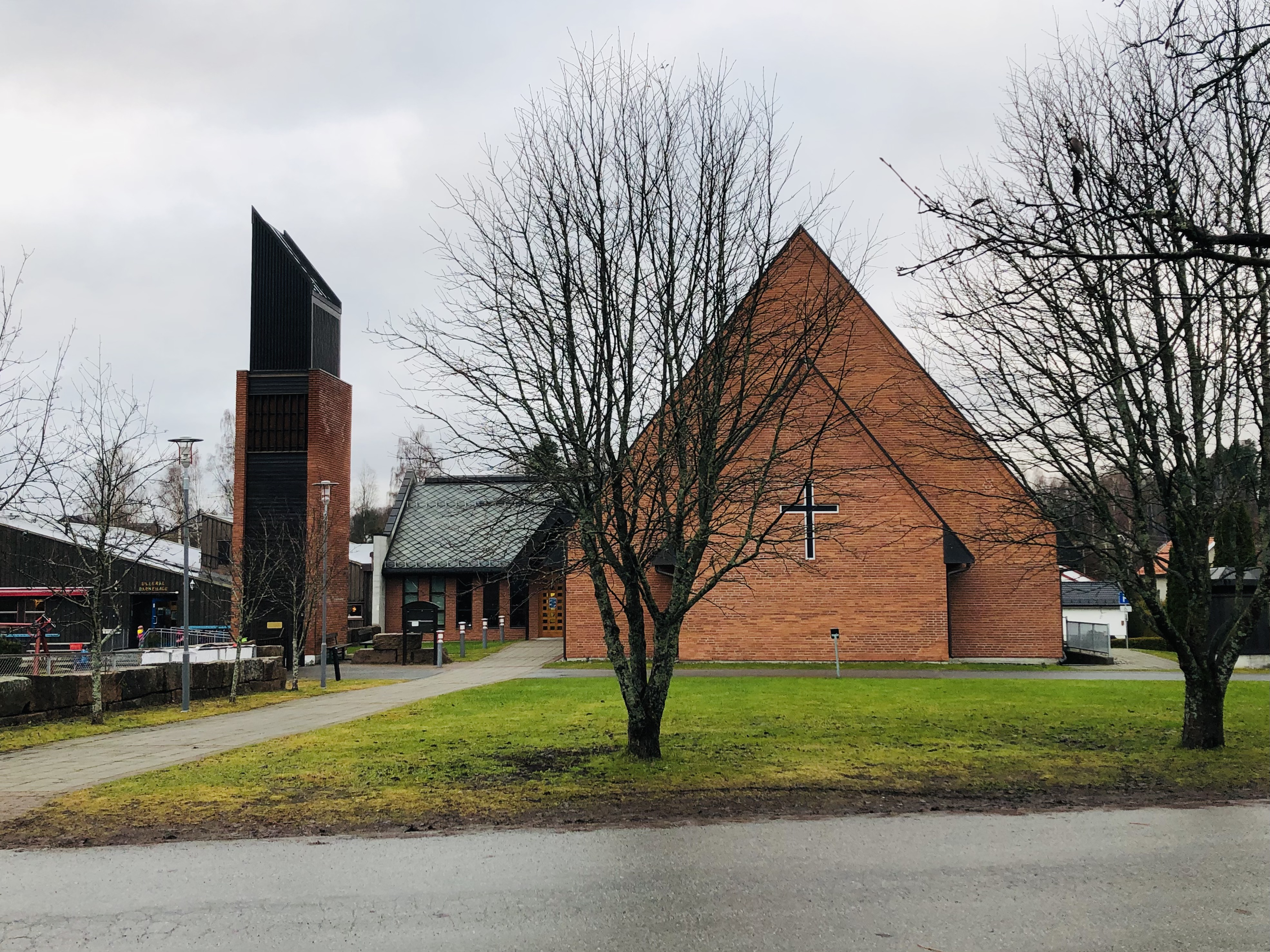

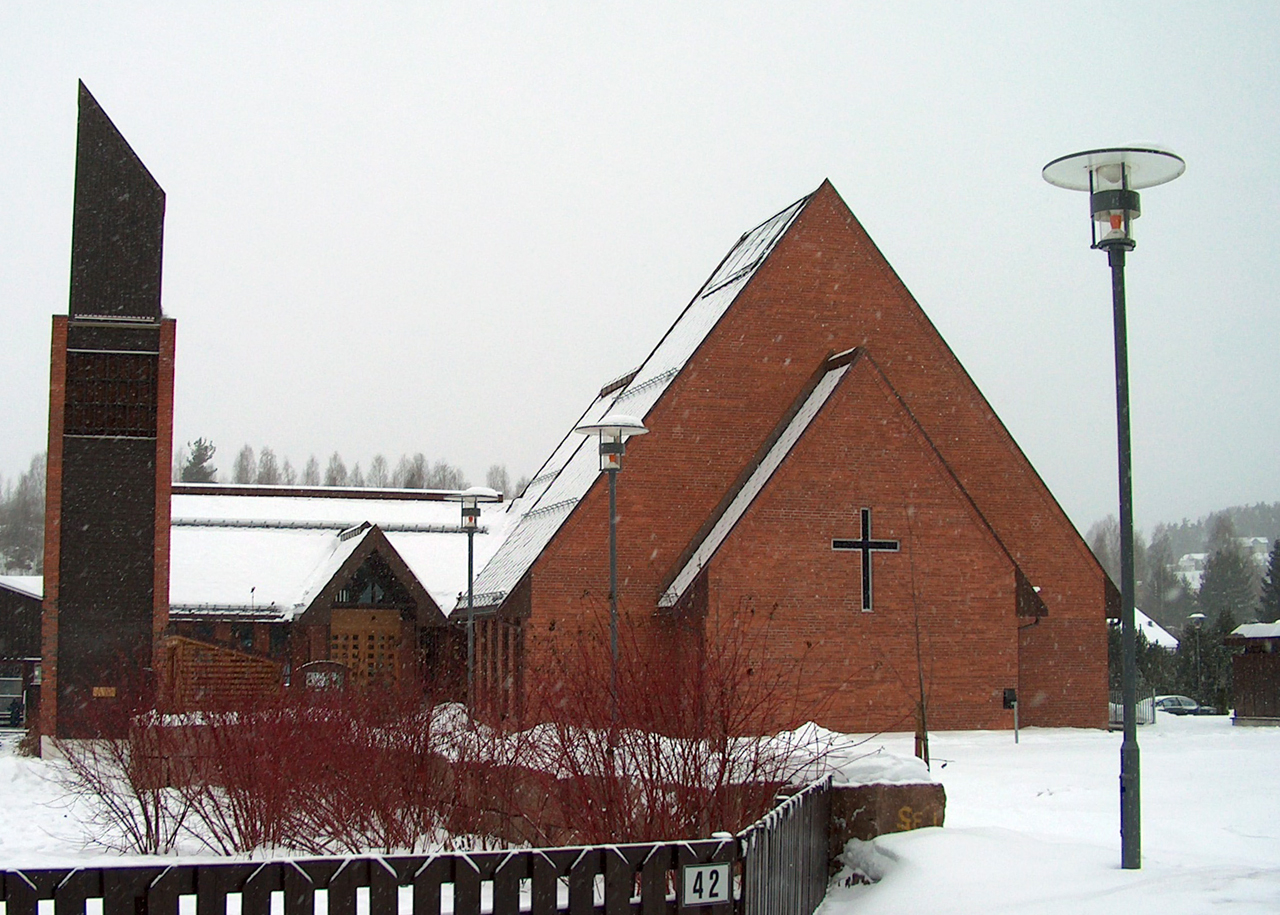

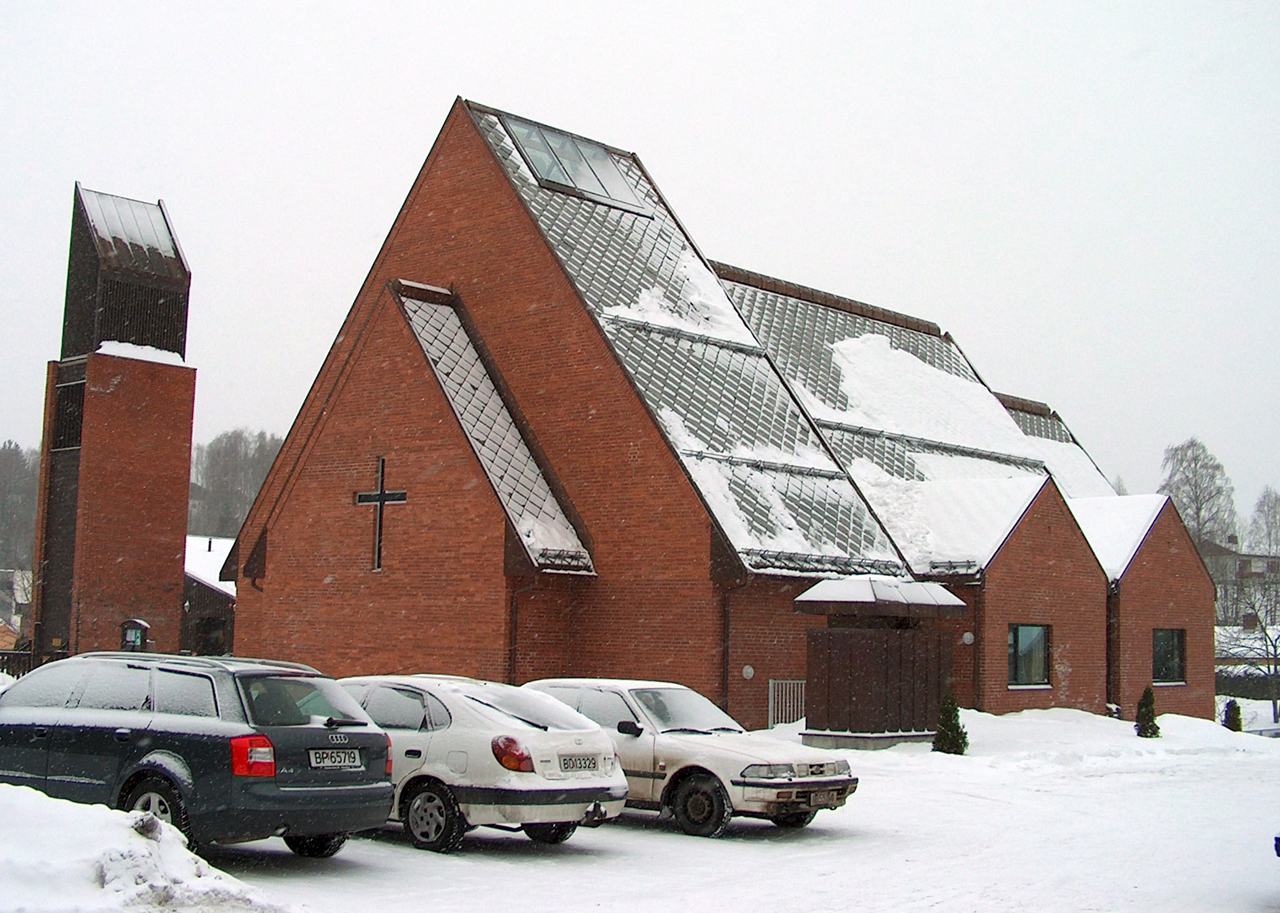

== See also ==
- List of churches in Tunsberg
