= Vikerfjell =

Mountain in Norway

- Location within Norway

Highest point
- Coordinates: 60°28′10″N 9°56′09″E

Geography
- Location: Buskerud, Norway

Vikerfjell is a mountain of Ringerike municipality, Buskerud, in southern Norway.
