= Øyangen (Ringerike) =

Lake in Ringerike, Norway

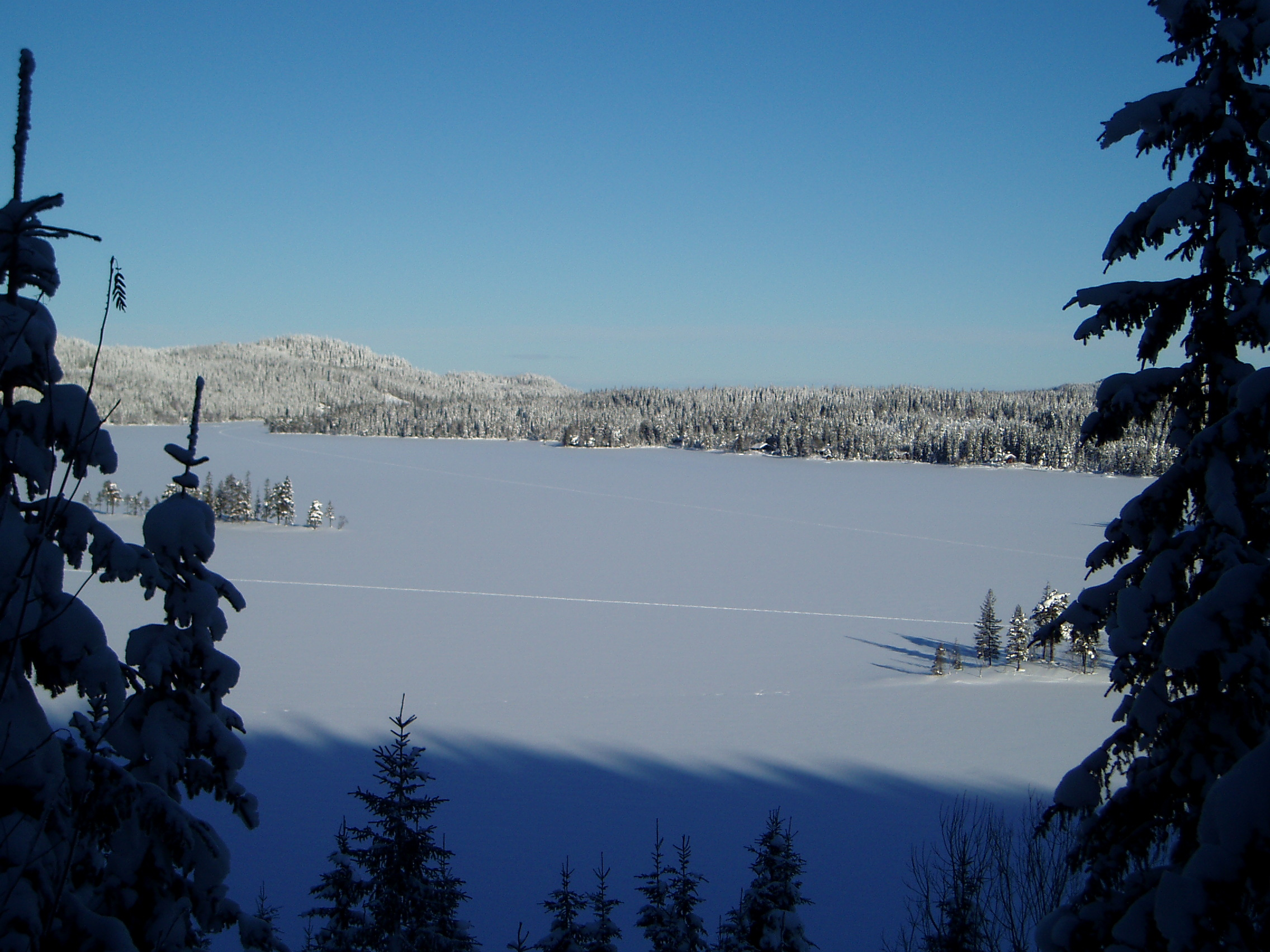
- Øyangen in winter

- Location within Buskerud
- Location: Ringerike (Buskerud)
- Coordinates: 60°10′10″N 10°26′7″E
- Basin countries: Norway
- Surface area: 3.14 km^{2} (1.21 sq mi)
- Shore length^{1}: 19.72 km (12.25 mi)
- Surface elevation: 562 m (1,844 ft)
- References: NVE
- ^{1} Shore length is not a well-defined measure.

Øyangen is a lake in the municipality of Ringerike in Buskerud county, Norway. The lake is located in Nordmarka, a large wooded area north of Oslo. Fishing is popular with the lake offering perch, trout and char.

== See also ==
- List of lakes in Norway
