= Kjell B. Hansen =

Norwegian politician (1957–2020)

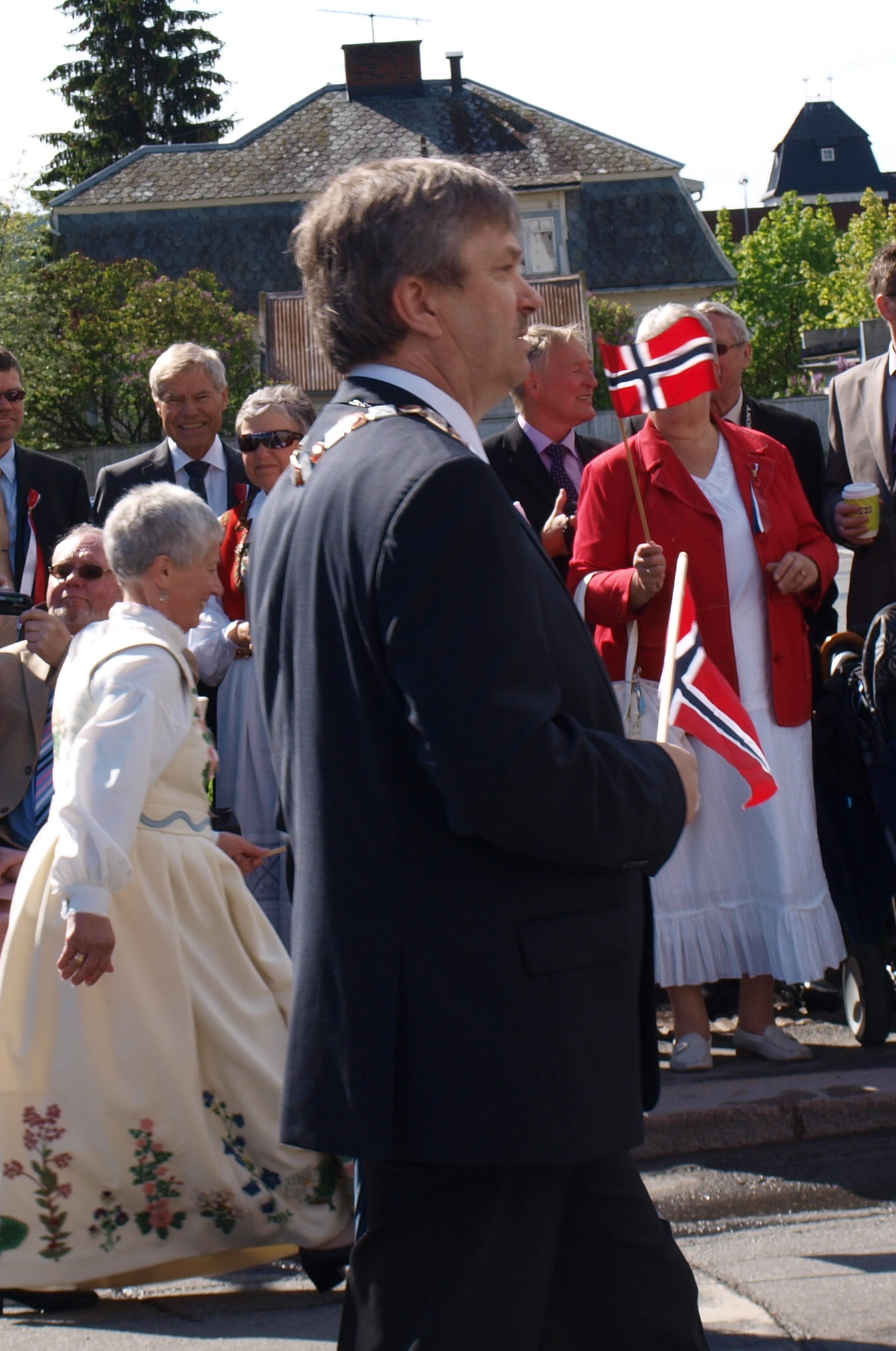
Norwegian politicians representing the Labor Party on May 17, 2011.

Kjell Børre Hansen (5 May 1957 – 31 May 2020) was a Norwegian politician for the Labour Party.

He served as a deputy representative to the Parliament of Norway from Buskerud during the term 2009–2013. In total he met during 141 days of parliamentary session. He served as mayor of Ringerike for twelve years, from 2007 to 2019. He died in May 2020, his last public appearance being the Constitution Day speech on 17 May 2020.
