= Ullerentjernet =

Lake in Ringerike, Norway

- Location within Norway
- Location: Ringerike (Buskerud)
- Coordinates: 60°7′17″N 10°4′9″E
- Basin countries: Norway
- Surface area: 11 ha (27 acres)
- Shore length^{1}: 2.07 km (1.29 mi)
- Surface elevation: 162 m (531 ft)
- References: NVE
- ^{1} Shore length is not a well-defined measure.

Ullerentjernet is a small lake located in the municipality of Ringerike in Buskerud, Norway. It is in the Skjærdalsvassdraget watershed formed by a number of smaller streams, rivers, ponds and marshes which drain into Tyrifjord. Ullerentjernet is situated in Holleia, a hilly terrain with a forest switching between spruce and pine.

== See also ==
- List of lakes in Norway
