= Nordeca =

Nordeca AS
- Type: Aksjeselskap
- Industry: Information technology
- Founded: 1990
- Headquarters: Lysaker, Norway
- Area served: Norway; Sweden; Denmark
- Key people: Rune Bertil Strømmen, CEO
- Products: Insight; Turkart; Norge-serien; Båtsportkart; Vannsportkart
- Number of employees: 30 (2012)
- Website: www.nordeca.com

Nordeca (formerly Ugland IT Group), headquartered in Lysaker, near Oslo, Norway, is one of the leading geographic information services companies in the Nordic area.

The company is one of the largest providers of geographical data in Norway. Its products include the geographic information service portfolio Insight. It is a market leader in the area of leisure maps for hiking and boating, publishing the Turkartserien and Norge-serien topographic maps, the Båtsportserien and Vannsportserien nautical charts, and distributes the digital products, maps and land ownership information of the Norwegian Mapping and Cadastre Authority, and also products of the Swedish Mapping Authority.

Nordeca has approximately 30 employees; in 2010 the company closed a subsidiary office in Ringerike that had once employed approximately 40 people, because map-making had become less labor-intensive with increasing computerization. The company has also discontinued some digital maps once produced by the Norwegian Mapping Authority as insufficiently profitable.

== History ==
The company was founded as Totalkart AS in Trondheim in 1990. In 1995 it was acquired by Knut Axel Ugland Holding AS and became Ugland Totalkart AS. In 1997, Minister of Trade and Industry Lars Sponheim opened the first Internet-based map service in Norway, MapOnWeb; in 1999, Ugland Totalkart AS changed its name to Maponweb AS in association with developing a range of internet-based map applications. In 2002, Maponweb AS merged with FlexIm Infowiz AS and Ugland Publikit AS to form Ugland IT Group.

In 2004, Ugland IT Group acquired the commercial division of the Norwegian Mapping Agency, Statens Kartver Marked, and became a market leader in printed leisure maps in Norway.

In 2005, Ugland IT Group acquired a rival Norwegian geographic information provider, Kartbutikken.no. In 2007, Ugland Holding reduced its position in the company and Cinclus Equity Partner became the majority shareholder.

On February 1, 2011, Ugland IT Group changed its name to Nordeca.
