= Ådalsfjella =

Mountain in Norway

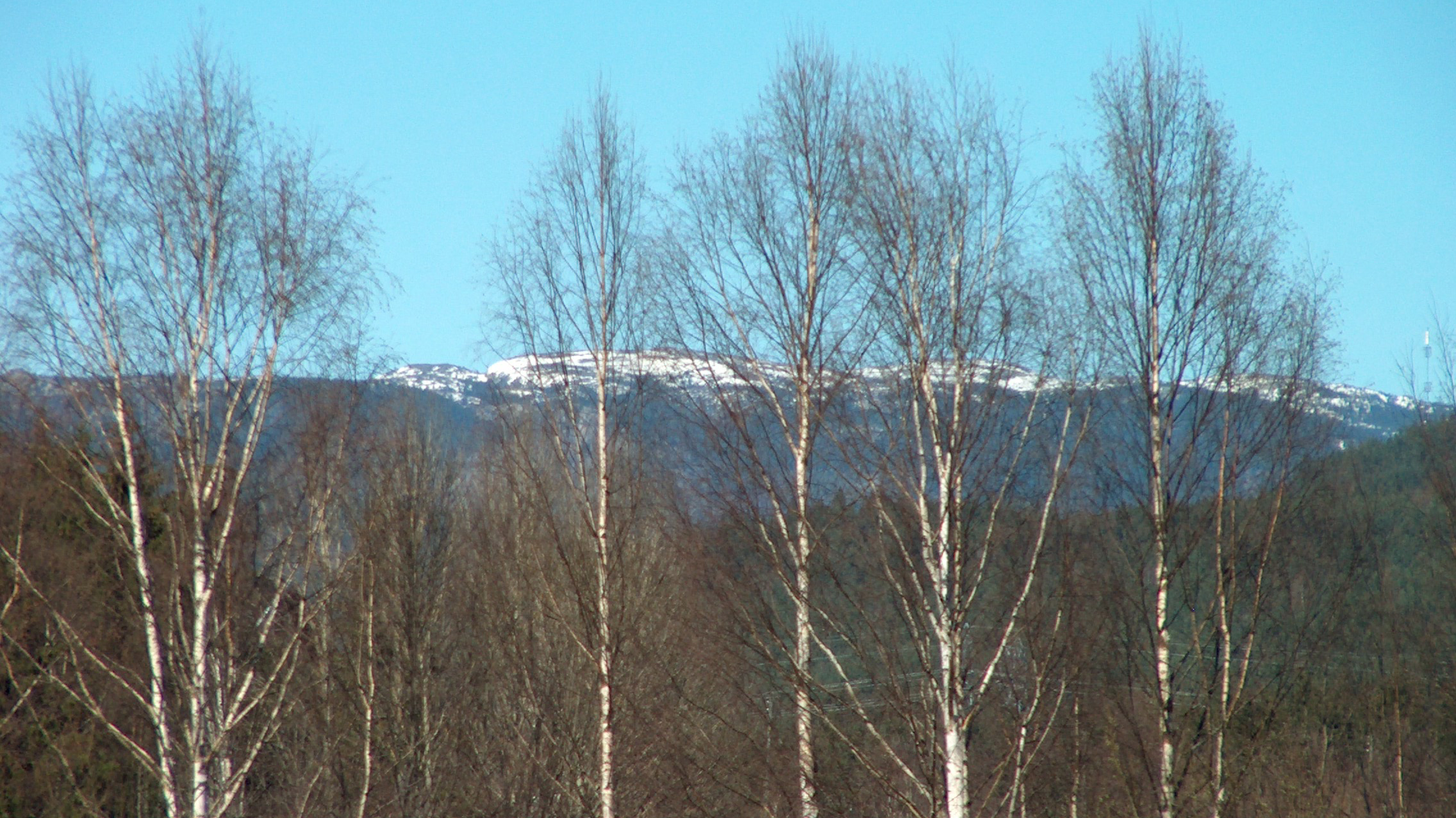
- Ådalsfjella from Soknedalen

Highest point
- Coordinates: 60°23′38″N 9°55′42″E

Geography
- Location within Buskerud Location within Norway
- Location: Buskerud, Norway

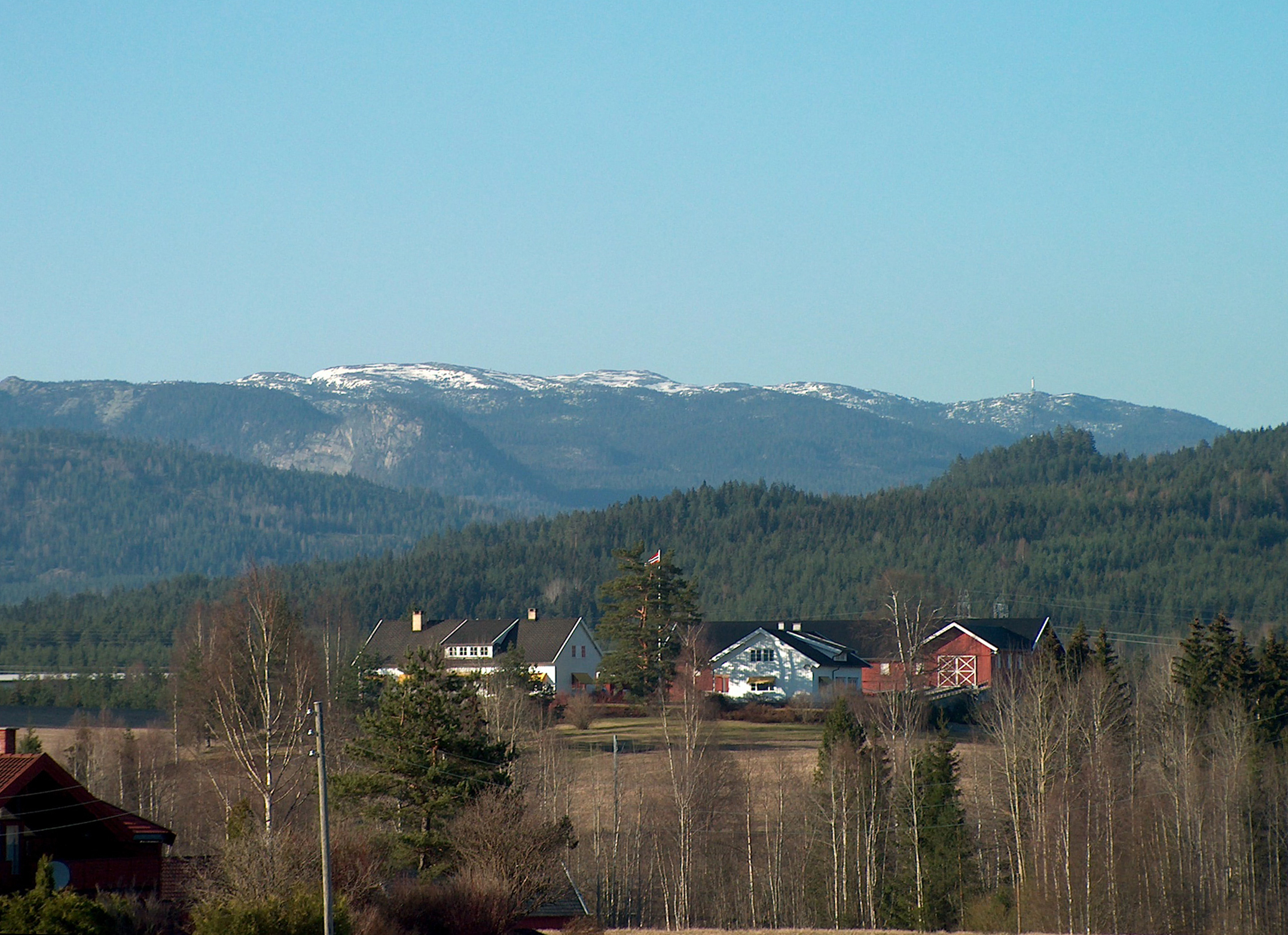
View towards Ådalsfjella from Soknedalen

Ådalsfjella is a mountain range in southern Norway. It consist of a series of smaller peaks and mountains located within Ringerike Municipality in Buskerud county. Ådalsfjella is a small mountain range which stretches from within Vestre Ådal in Ådal to Vassfaret bordering Sør-Aurdal Municipality in Innlandet county. The mountain range lies between Lake Sperillen to the east and the valley of Soknedalen to the west.

== See also ==
- Urdevassfjell
