= Høgfjell =

Mountain in Norway

Highest point
- Elevation: 1,009 m (3,310 ft)
- Coordinates: 60°22′01″N 10°0′0″E

Geography
- Location: Buskerud, Norway

Høgfjell is a mountain in the municipality of Ringerike in Buskerud, Norway.
