= Kjølfjellet =

Mountain in Norway

Geography
- Location: Buskerud, Norway

Kjølfjellet is a mountain in the municipality of Ringerike in Buskerud, Norway.
