= Olav Brænden =

Norwegian pharmacist, drug expert and inventor

- Born: 1 July 1919; Norderhov, Norway
- Died: 14 July 1989 (aged 70)
- Education: University of Oslo; University of Minnesota; Paris-Sorbonne University
- Occupations: Pharmacist, drug expert and inventor
- Awards: Order of St. Olav

Olav Johan Brænden (1 July 1919 – 14 July 1989) was a Norwegian pharmacist, drug expert and inventor. He led the construction and operation of the central laboratory for drug research at the United Nations Office at Geneva. He is also associated with his development of the patented medicine Brændens nesedråper (nose droplets).

He was born at Norderhov (now Ringerike) in Buskerud, Norway. He was the son of Johan Brandenen (1869-1952) and Anne Juvkam (1873-1953). During the 1950s his interests centered on drug-related questions. Brænden studied pharmacy at the University of Oslo, and graduated as pharmaceutical chemist in 1942. During the German occupation of Norway, he was arrested in 1944 for involvement in illegal work and led to Grini where he remained until the end of World War II.

In 1947, he went to the University of Minnesota where he graduated in 1950. He worked on drug issues at the National Institute of Health in Bethesda, Maryland from 1951 until 1953. He then was Social Affairs Officer at the United Nations headquarters in New York City for two years. He subsequently studied at the Paris-Sorbonne University in Paris and at the Institute de la Médecine Tropicale in Bondy. From 1955 he led the development of the United Nations drug laboratory in Geneva. He served as Director of the laboratory and was also head of the United Nations Research Program on Drugs until his retirement in 1979.

He was decorated Knight, First Class of the Order of St. Olav in 1980. He was made a member of the Norwegian Academy of Sciences from 1983.
