= Norwegian Mapping Authority =

National mapping agency of Norway

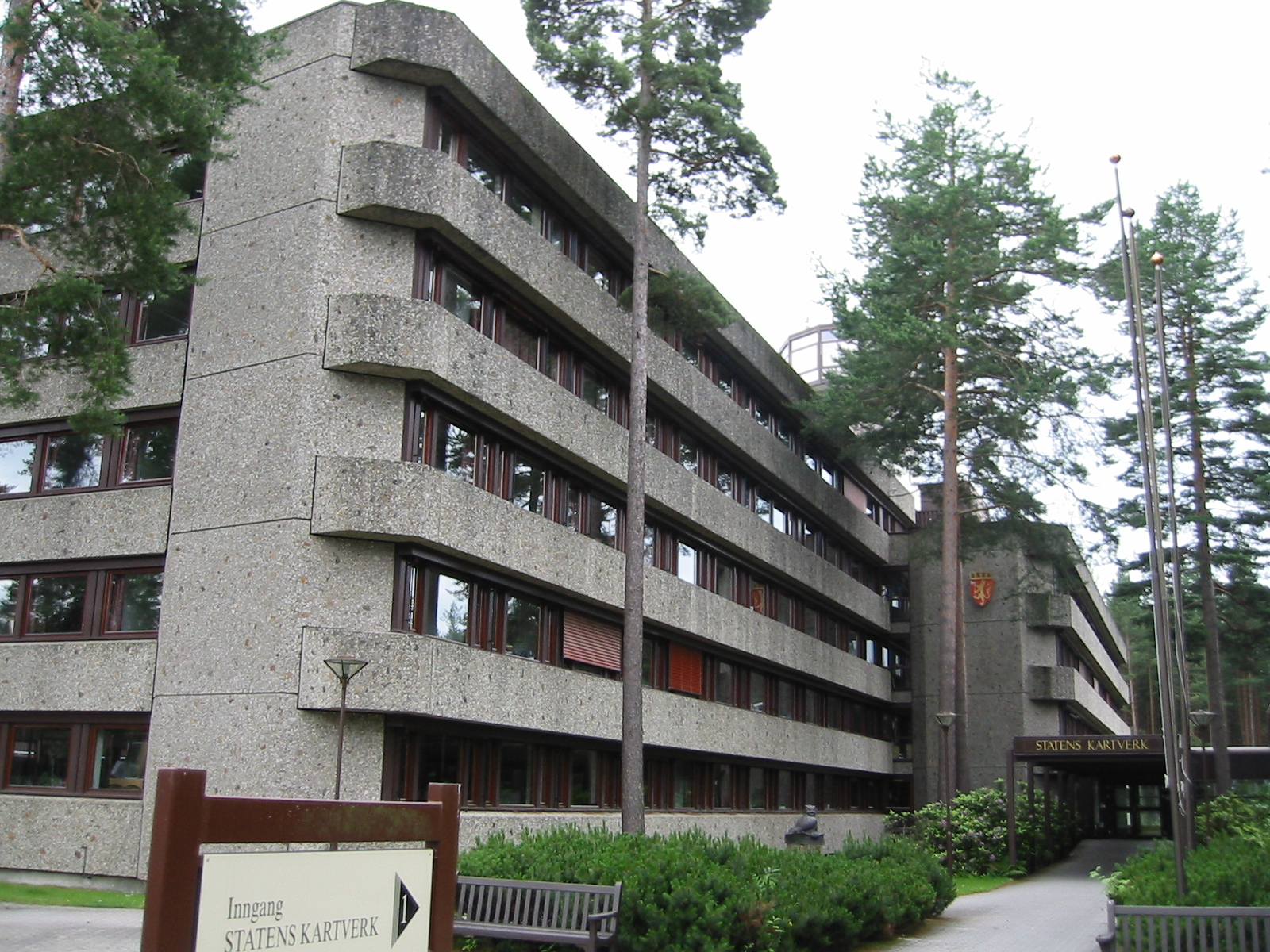
The Authority's headquarters in Hønefoss

The Norwegian Mapping Authority (NMA) (Norwegian: Statens kartverk or Kartverket) is Norway's national mapping agency, dealing with land surveying, geodesy, hydrographic surveying, cadastre and cartography. The current director is Johnny Welle. Its headquarters are in Hønefoss in Ringerike Municipality. It is a public agency under the Ministry of Local Government and Regional Development. NMA was founded in 1773.

The Norwegian Mapping Authority participates in research and development and cooperates with Norwegian industry and other government agencies in areas such as export-oriented measures.

== Tasks ==
The NMA carries out the following tasks:

- Define frameworks, methodologies and specifications for the Norwegian Spatial Data Infrastructure
- Administrator and driving force for Norway digital
- Survey and map both at land and sea
- Produce, manage and make available the geographical information defined as a government responsibility
- Geodetic network and services for accurate GNSS-positioning
- Primary data series, digital and printed map series (land and sea)
- Cadastre information
- Land registration
- Develop and manage electronic services for distribution of data (wms- and wmf-services)
- International co-operation and projects

== Organization ==
=== Geodetic Institute ===
The Geodetic institute is the national authority for geodesy, determining the geodetic reference frame and other geodetic products such as the geoid and height reference. The institute operates a service for accurate GNSS-positioning.

=== Mapping and Cadastre ===
The Mapping and Cadastre establish and manage spatial data covering Norwegian land areas, in cooperation with municipalities and different public agencies. The division produce national map data series in different scales and the national printed map series Norway 1:50 000. Mapping and Cadastre operate The National Place Name Register and The New Cadastre (matrikkelen) with physical and ownership information including digital cadastre maps about properties.

=== Land Registry ===
The Land Registry is responsible for and manages The National Land Registry, which includes a registry of leasing rights to flats in housing co-operatives.

=== Hydrographic Service ===
The Hydrographic Service is responsible for surveying the Norwegian coast, including polar waters and for preparing and updating nautical charts and descriptions of these waters. The activities also include studies of tides and currents and publishing tide tables. The Hydrographic Service has the operational responsibility for the international electronic navigational chart centre Primar, based in Stavanger.

=== Distribution Service ===
The Distribution Service is responsible for publishing analog and digital maps, and to provide mapping services to the public and partners of the Norway Digital consortium. In 2004 some commercial activity of the Authority was divested to the then Ugland IT group, later renamed Nordeca.
