= Elling M. Solheim =

Norwegian writer

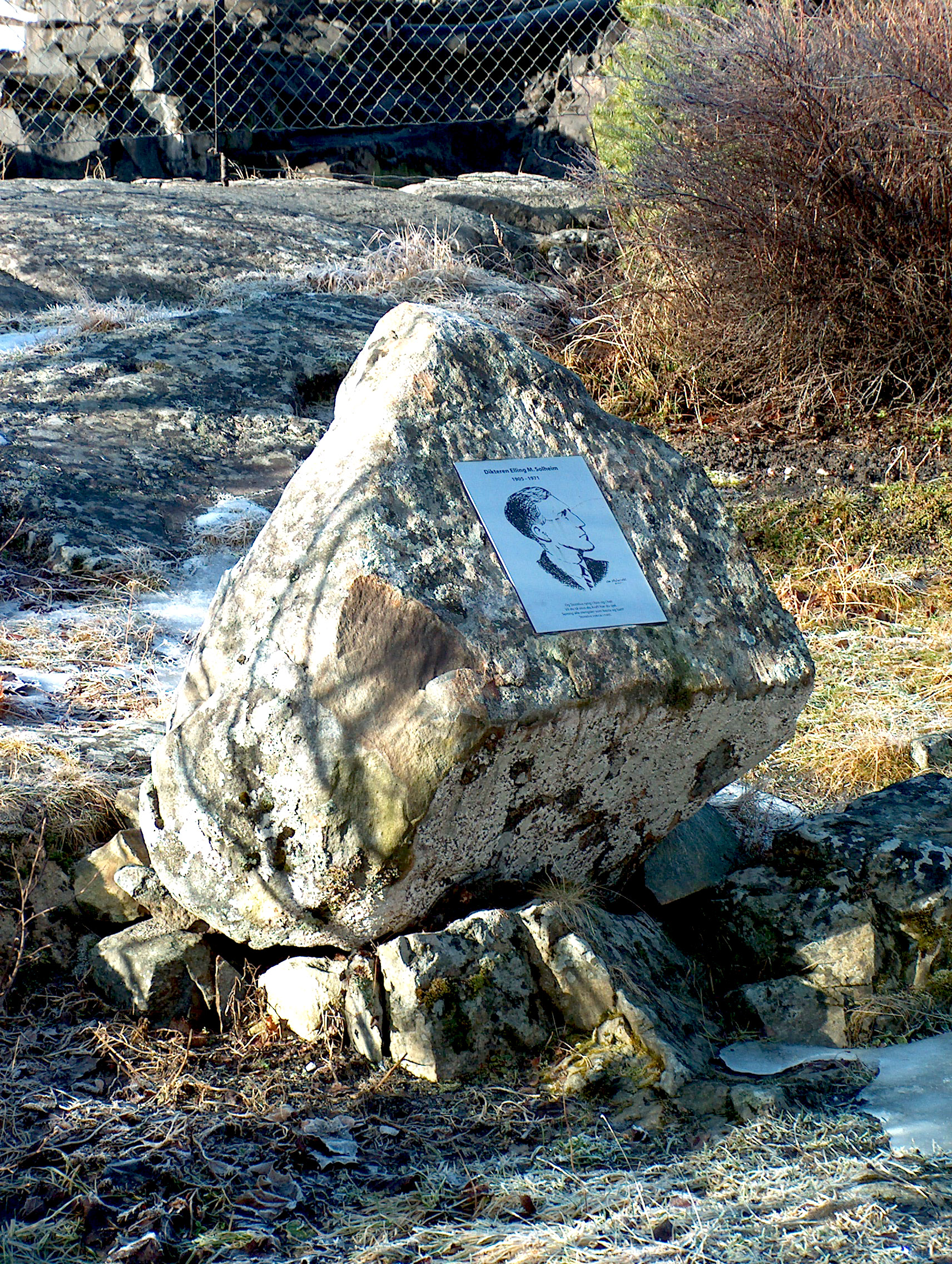
- Memorial of Elling Solheim, in Hønefoss.
- Born: 17 January 1905
- Died: 6 January 1971 (aged 65)
- Occupation: Writer

Elling M. Solheim (17 January 1905 – 5 January 1971) was a Norwegian poet, playwright and short story writer. He was born in Norderhov. His first literary work, Preludium from 1925, was not published due to bankruptcy of the publishing house. His first published poetry collection was Jeg lever idag from 1934. From the late 1930s he suffered from multiple sclerosis, but continued writing poetry and other literary works. He died in Ringerike in 1971. A bronze bust of Solheim, sculptured by Ståle Kyllingstad, is located at the Ringerike public library.
