= Ringerike Municipality =

Ringerike Municipality Ringerike kommune
- Municipality
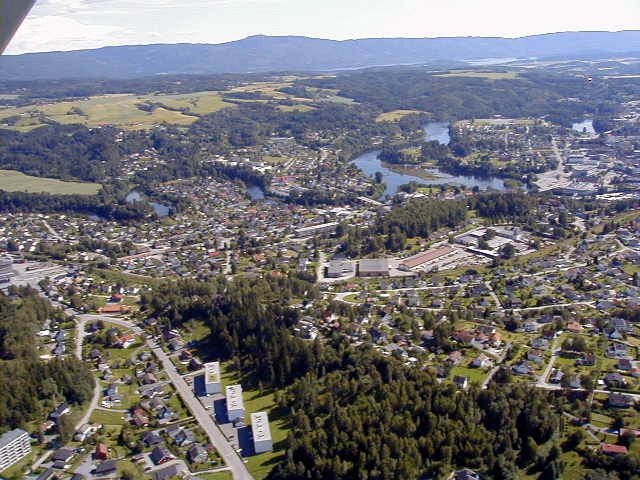
- Town of Hønefoss

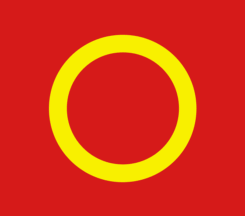
- Flag Coat of arms

- Buskerud within Norway

- Ringerike within Buskerud
- Coordinates: 60°12′19″N 10°9′9″E
- Country: Norway
- County: Buskerud
- District: Ringerike
- Administrative centre: Hønefoss

Area
  - Total: 1,552 km^{2} (599 sq mi)
  - Land: 1,423 km^{2} (549 sq mi)
  - Rank: #51 in Norway

Population (2020)
  - Total: 30,641
  - Rank: #35 in Norway
  - Density: 2,155/km^{2} (5,580/sq mi)
  - Change (10 years): ▲ +2.4%
- Demonym: Ringeriking

Official language
  - Norwegian form: Bokmål
- Time zone: UTC+01:00 (CET)
  - Summer (DST): UTC+02:00 (CEST)
- ISO 3166 code: NO-3305
- Website: Official website

Ringerike is a municipality in Buskerud county, Norway. It is part of the traditional region of Ringerike. The administrative centre of the municipality is the town of Hønefoss.

The municipality of Ringerike was created on 1 January 1964 after the merger of the town of Hønefoss and the rural municipalities of Hole, Norderhov, Tyristrand, and Ådal. However, the area of Hole was removed from the municipality of Ringerike on 1 January 1977 to become a separate municipality once again. The historic area of Ringerike included not just the modern municipality of Ringerike but also Hole and Krødsherad, Modum, and Sigdal.

== General information ==
=== Etymology ===
The Old Norse form of this name was Hringaríki. The first element is (probably) the genitive plural of hringir, the name of an old Germanic tribe. The last element is ríki n 'kingdom, reich'. (See also Romerike.)

=== Coat of arms ===
The coat of arms were granted on 16 June 1967. The arms show a gold ring on a red background. The colours red and gold represent royalty and are the royal colors of Norway. The ring is a canting symbol and at the same time symbolises the unity of the area, which has been a separate entity (even considered a petty kingdom) since medieval times.

Number of minorities (1st and 2nd generation) in Ringerike by country of origin in 2017
Ancestry	Number
Poland	663
Lithuania	198
Germany	190
Kosovo	179
Iraq	162
Russia	160
Denmark	159
Bosnia-Herzegovina	149
Iran	147
Thailand	135
Syria	126
Sweden	124

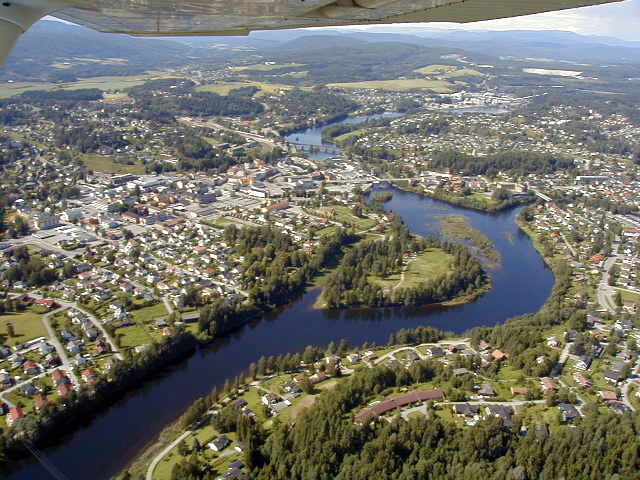
Hønefoss, largest town and the administrative centre of Ringerike

== Geography ==
The municipality of Ringerike is bordered on the north by Sør-Aurdal Municipality and Søndre Land Municipality; on the east by Gran Municipality, Jevnaker Municipality, Lunner Municipality, and Oslo Municipality; in the south by Bærum Municipality, Hole Municipality, and Modum Municipality; and in the west by Krødsherad Municipality and Flå Municipality.

Lakes in the region include:

- Samsjøen
- Øyangen
- Sperillen
- Ullerentjernet
- Vestre Bjonevatnet

It is also home to mountain ranges, including Ådalsfjella.

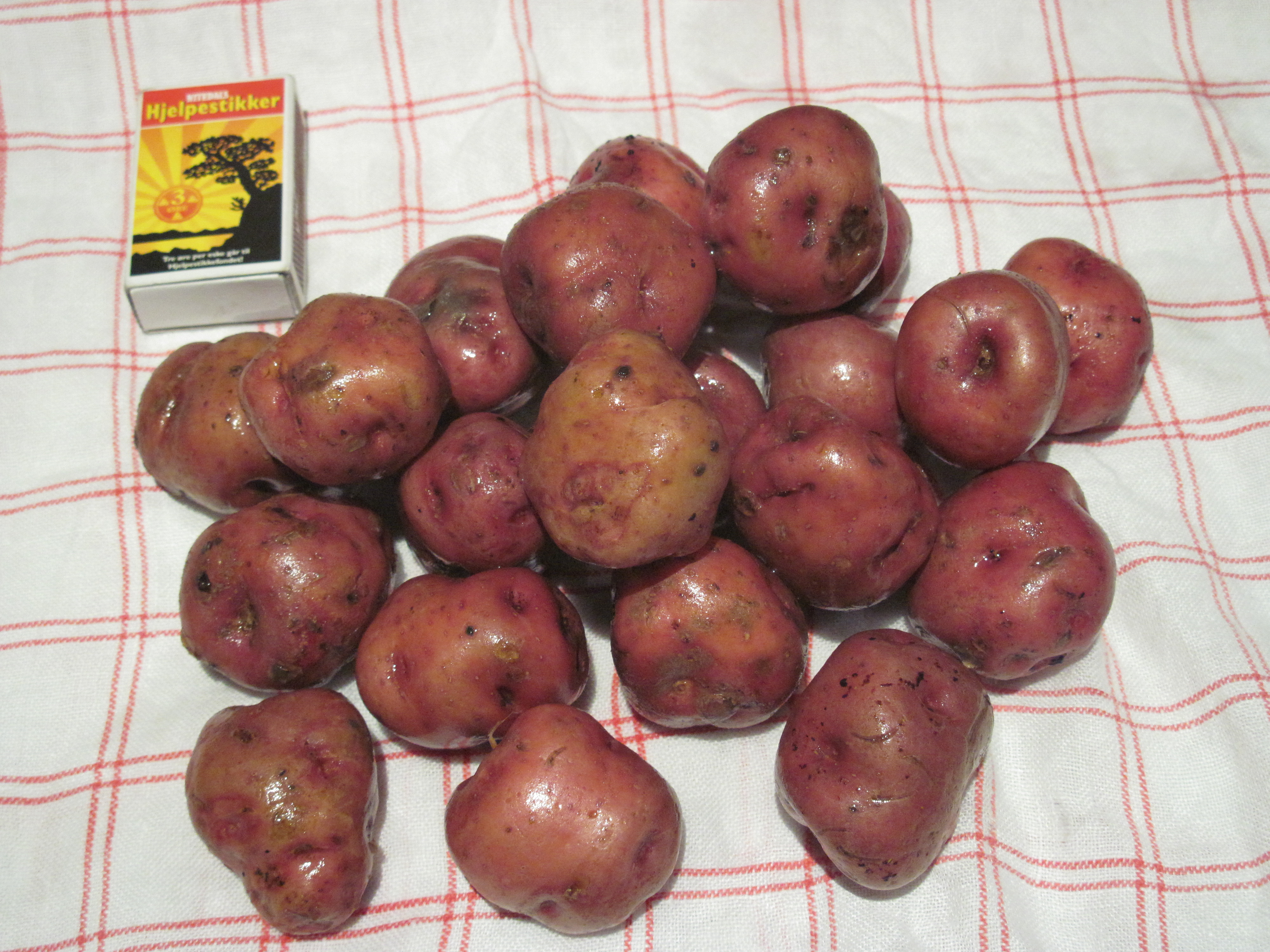
Ringerike potato

== Climate ==
Ringerike has a humid continental climate (Dfb) with relatively warm summers and cold winters with snow on the ground. The all-time high 33.7 °C (92.7 °F) was recorded July 2018. The all-time low −27.1 °C (−16.8 °F) was recorded 6 January 2024.

Climate data for Hønefoss 1991-2020 (Høyby, 140 m, average high/low 2006-2025, extremes 2005-2023, precip days 1961-90)
Month	Jan	Feb	Mar	Apr	May	Jun	Jul	Aug	Sep	Oct	Nov	Dec	Year
Record high °C (°F)	13 (55)	14.2 (57.6)	20.5 (68.9)	23.9 (75.0)	30.1 (86.2)	31.6 (88.9)	33.7 (92.7)	29.1 (84.4)	24.7 (76.5)	19.2 (66.6)	15.7 (60.3)	12.2 (54.0)	33.7 (92.7)
Mean daily maximum °C (°F)	−1.6 (29.1)	0.4 (32.7)	6 (43)	11.8 (53.2)	17.1 (62.8)	21.5 (70.7)	23.3 (73.9)	21.2 (70.2)	16.9 (62.4)	9.8 (49.6)	4 (39)	−0.4 (31.3)	10.8 (51.5)
Daily mean °C (°F)	−4.1 (24.6)	−3.5 (25.7)	0.5 (32.9)	5.3 (41.5)	10.6 (51.1)	14.8 (58.6)	17.3 (63.1)	15.9 (60.6)	11.5 (52.7)	5.5 (41.9)	0.8 (33.4)	−3.3 (26.1)	5.9 (42.7)
Mean daily minimum °C (°F)	−7.1 (19.2)	−6.2 (20.8)	−3.1 (26.4)	0.7 (33.3)	5.8 (42.4)	10.3 (50.5)	12.6 (54.7)	11.3 (52.3)	8 (46)	3.1 (37.6)	−1.1 (30.0)	−5.5 (22.1)	2.4 (36.3)
Record low °C (°F)	−27.1 (−16.8)	−24.7 (−12.5)	−19 (−2)	−9.3 (15.3)	−3.2 (26.2)	2.7 (36.9)	5.2 (41.4)	1.8 (35.2)	−2.8 (27.0)	−8.3 (17.1)	−16.2 (2.8)	−21.8 (−7.2)	−27.1 (−16.8)
Average precipitation mm (inches)	35 (1.4)	25 (1.0)	27 (1.1)	32 (1.3)	54 (2.1)	70 (2.8)	73 (2.9)	85 (3.3)	65 (2.6)	62 (2.4)	50 (2.0)	32 (1.3)	610 (24.2)
Average precipitation days (≥ 1.0 mm)	8	6	7	7	9	9	11	10	10	10	9	8	104
Source 1: Norwegian Meteorological Institute eklima.met.no
Source 2: Seklima

== Economy ==
Billions of Norwegian kroner has been invested (as of 2022) in infrastructure, as a result of a government order (oppdragsbrev) in 2015; the municipality had to do their part in regard to the project "Ringerike Line"; the national budget is not final yet (as of October 2022) and government money for the project has not yet been allocated.

Ringerike is famous for two agriculture products; Ringerike potato (Ringerikspotet) and Ringerike pea (Ringeriksert). Jens Aabel first started production of Ringerike potato around 1867. The Ringerike pea has obtained PDO (protected designation of origin). In June 2007, the Ringerike potato got "protected geographical indication" (PGI) under the name Ringerikspotet fra Ringerike. Six farmers are now producing and packing this special potato at Ask in Ringerike. Most of the potatoes are sold in the Oslo area.

The town was also home to the commercial operations of the Norwegian Mapping Authority which in 2004 divested these to the then Ugland IT Group, later renamed Nordeca. The offices were closed in 2010 with all operations moving to Lysaker due to increasing computerization of map-making.

== Notable residents ==
Covers people in the wider Municipality,

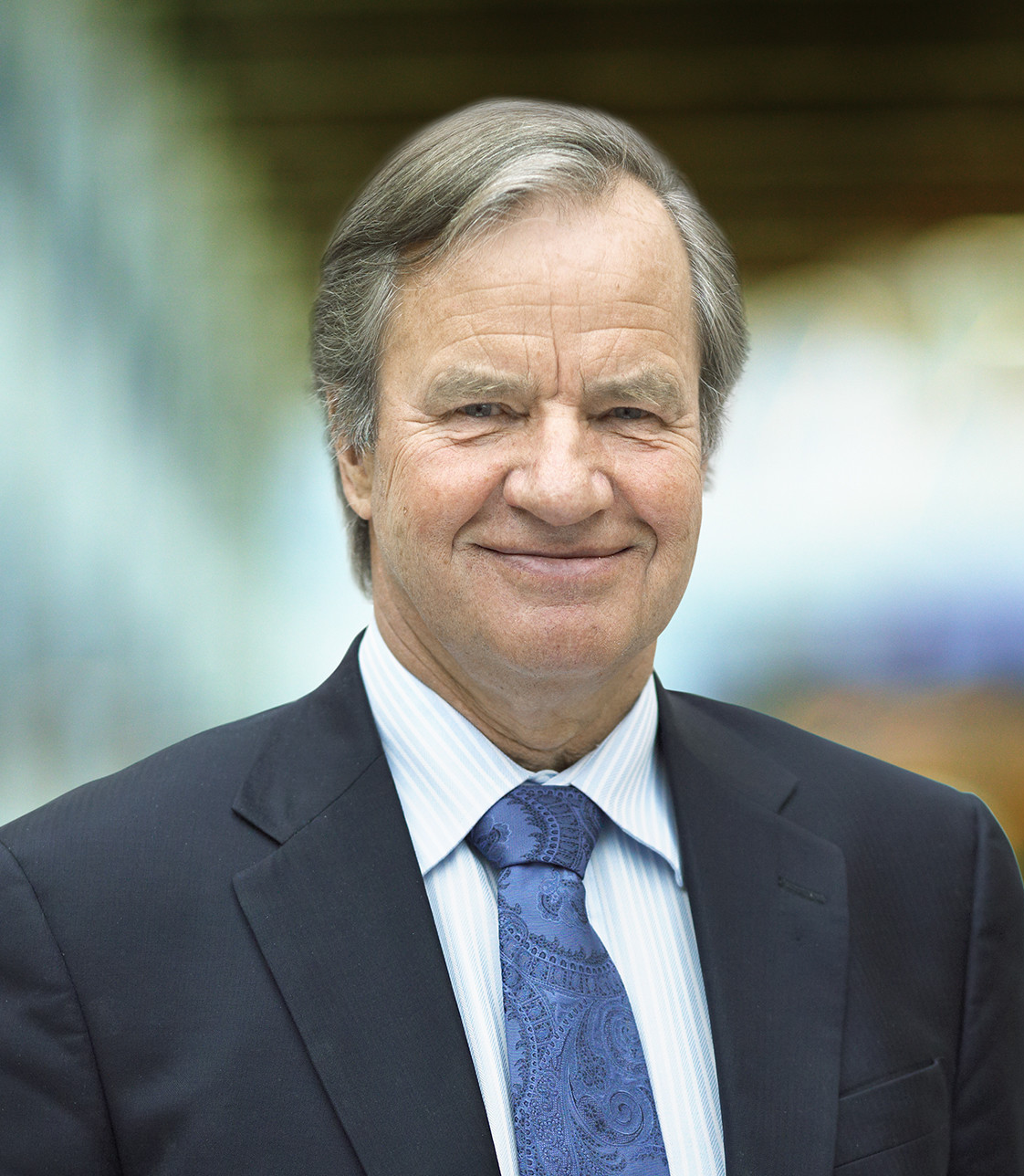
Bjørn Kjos, 2014

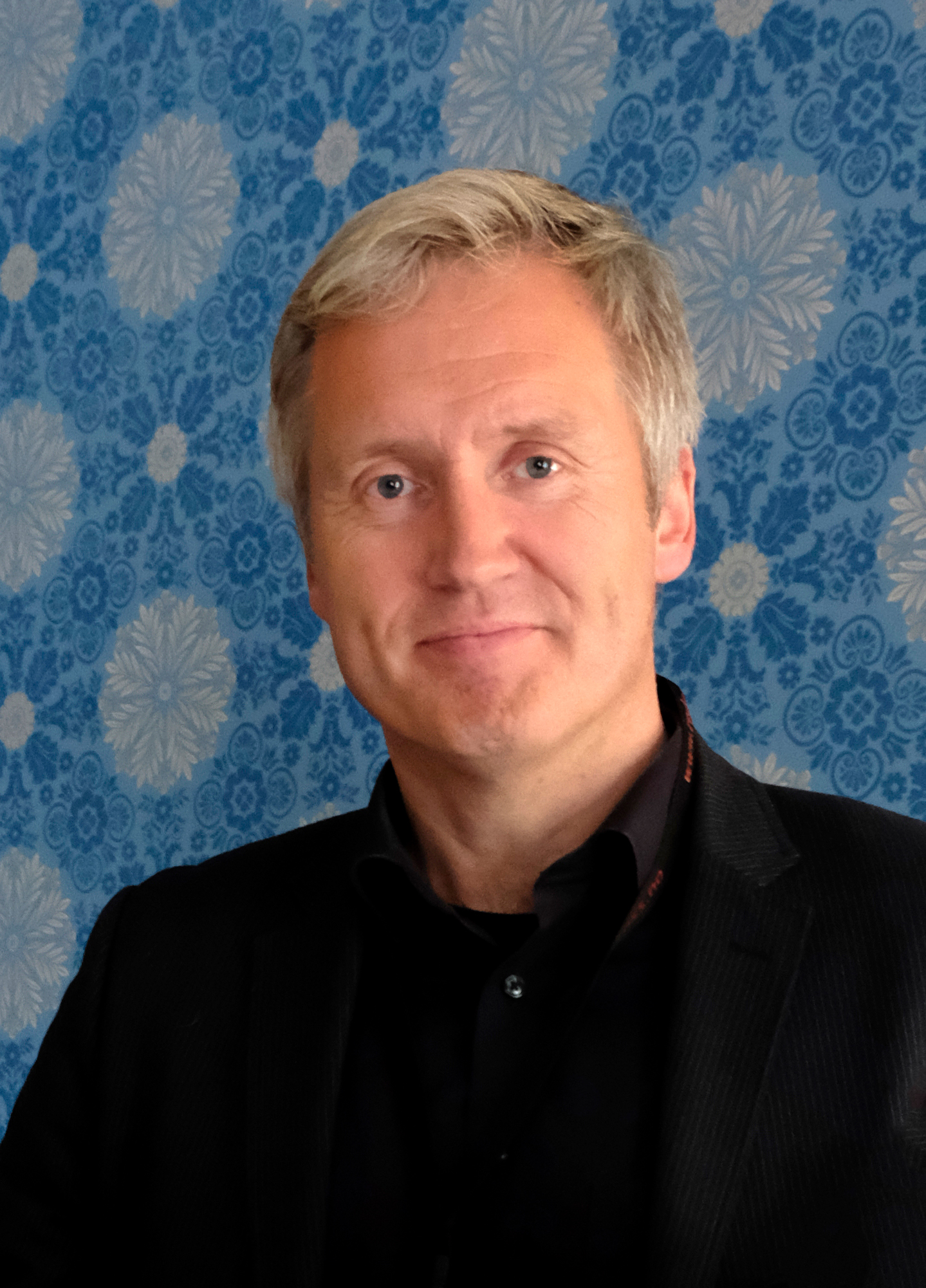
Bård Frydenlund, 2018

- Helge Ellingsen Waagaard (1781 in Norderhov – 1817) a farmer and non-commissioned military officer, a rep. at the Norwegian Constituent Assembly
- Michael Færden (1836 in Norderhov – 1912), a Norwegian priest and author
- Andrea Gram (1853 in Ask – 1927), a Norwegian painter of landscapes and portraits
- Rolf Bull-Hansen (1888 in Norderhov – 1970), a Norwegian educator and author
- Elling M. Solheim (1905 in Norderhov – 1971), a poet, playwright and short story writer
- Olav Brænden (1919 in Norderhov – 1989), a Norwegian pharmacist, drug expert and inventor
- Olav Aspheim (1921 in Ringerike – 1948), a member of the WWII fascist party Nasjonal Samling
- Eyvind Fjeld Halvorsen (1922 in Ringerike – 2013), a Norwegian philologist
- Arild Hiim (born 1945 in Ringerike – 2024), politician and member of parliament
- Bjørn Kjos (born 1946 in Sokna), founder and CEO of Norwegian Air Shuttle.
- Bjørn Skogmo, (Norwegian Wiki) (1948 in Jevnaker - 2020), writer
- Kjell B. Hansen (1957–2020), a politician, Mayor of Ringerike 2007-2019
- Bård frydenlund (born 1972 in Ringerike), an author and historian, CEO at Eidsvoll 1814

=== Sport ===
- Randi Thorvaldsen (1925 in Øvre Eiker – 2011), speedskater
- Erik Hagen (born 1975 in Veme), footballer with 360 club caps and 28 for Norway
- Rune Hagen (born 1975 in Veme), a Norwegian former footballer with 280 club caps
- Tor Øyvind Hovda (born 1989 in Ringerike), a Norwegian footballer with 250 club caps

== International relations ==
=== Twin towns — Sister cities ===
The following cities are twinned with Ringerike:

- Aabenraa, Region of Southern Denmark, Denmark
- Lohja, Southern Finland, Finland
- Emmeloord, Flevoland, Netherlands
- Skagaströnd, Iceland
- Växjö, Kronoberg County, Sweden
- Vera, Almería, Spain in 1989

== Gallery ==
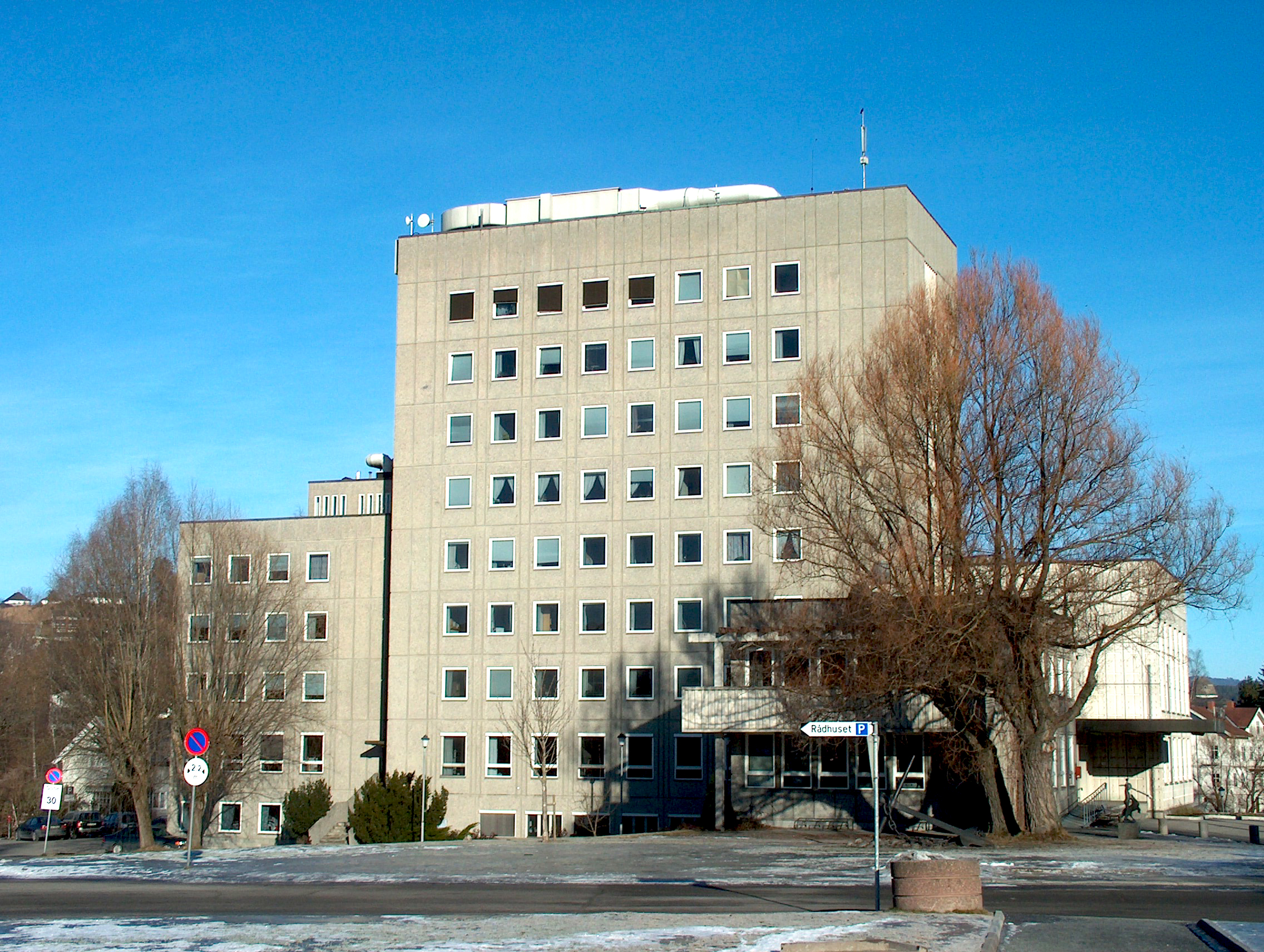
Ringerike Town Hall

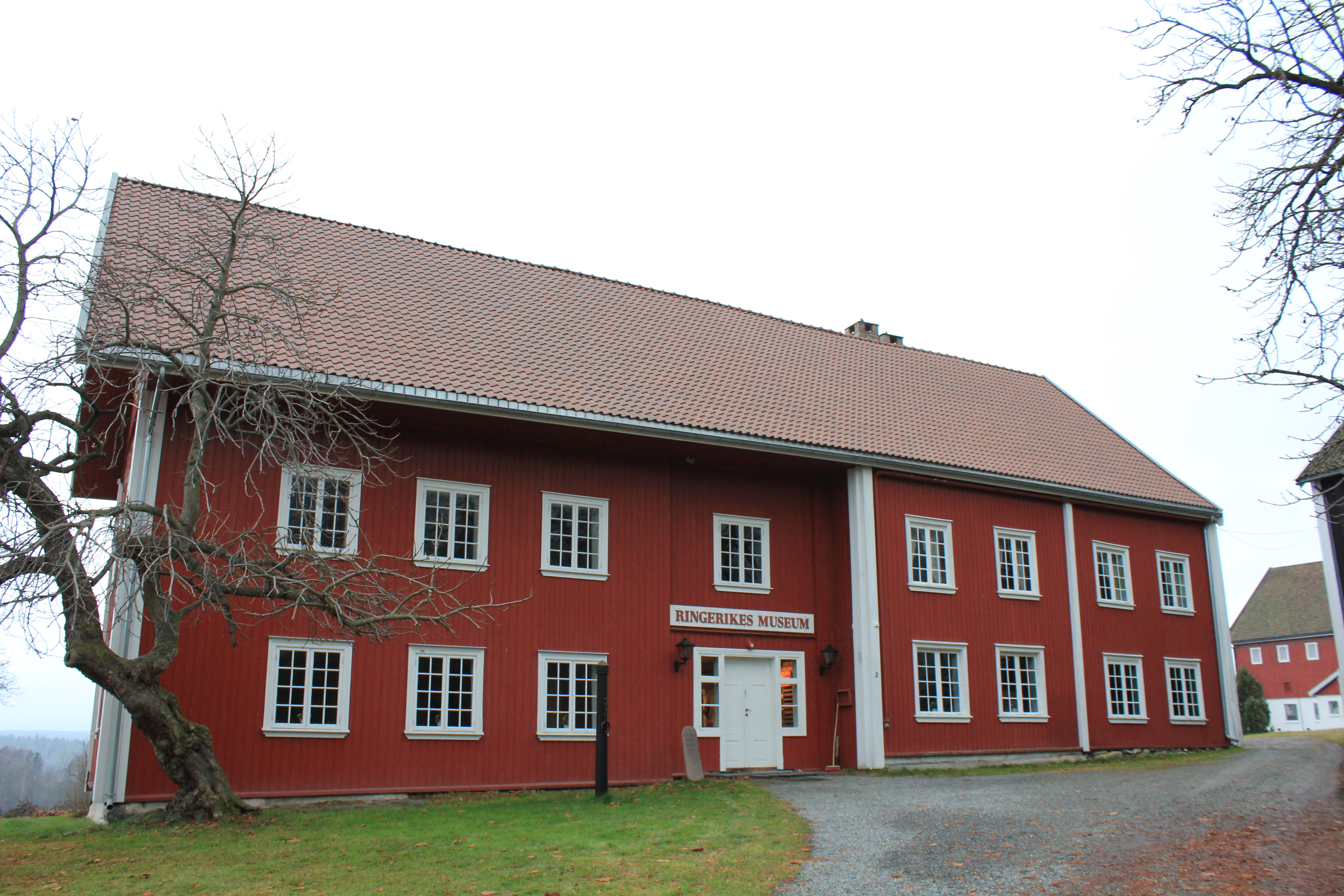
Ringerikes Museum

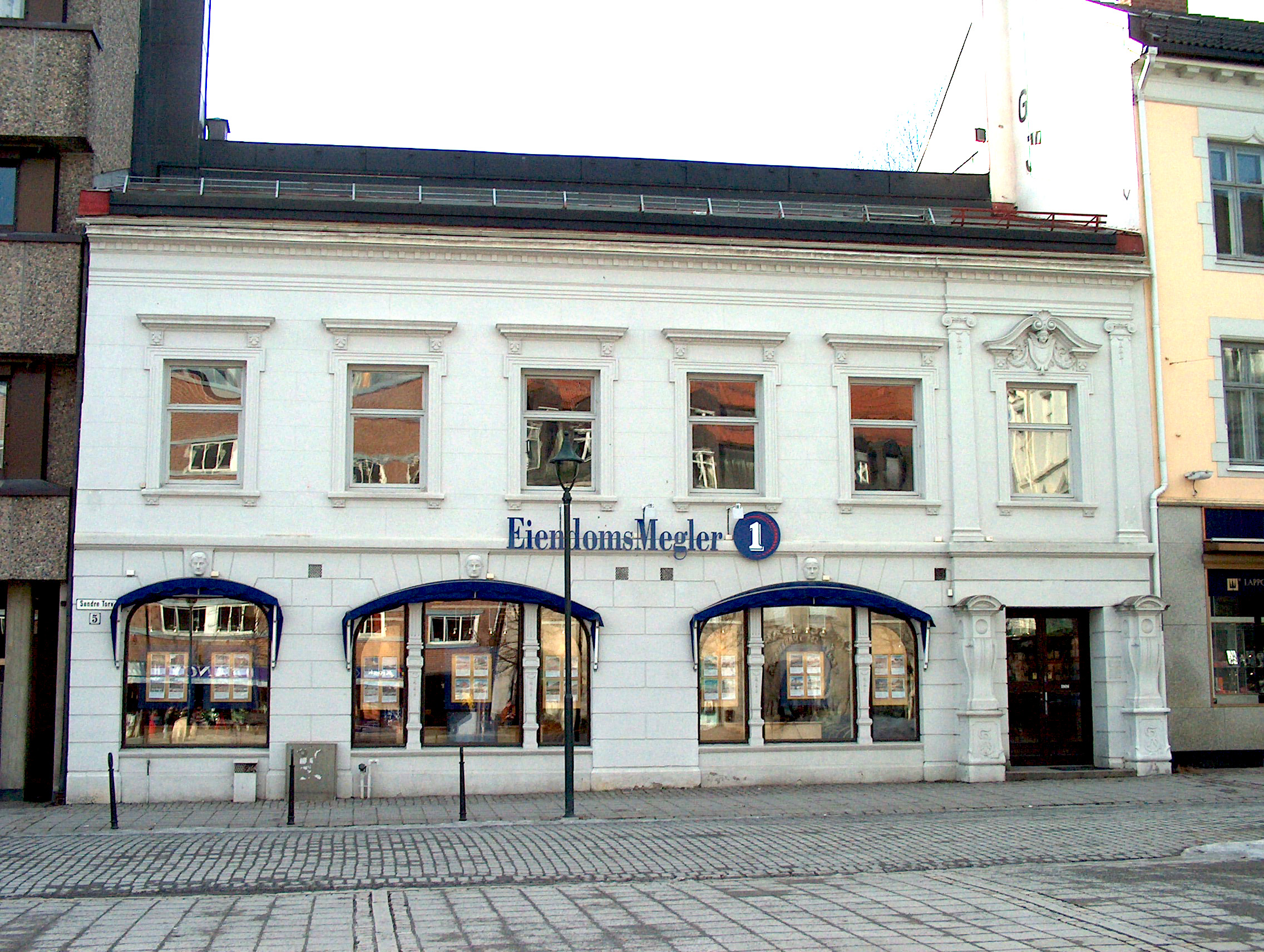
Tandberggården in Hønefoss

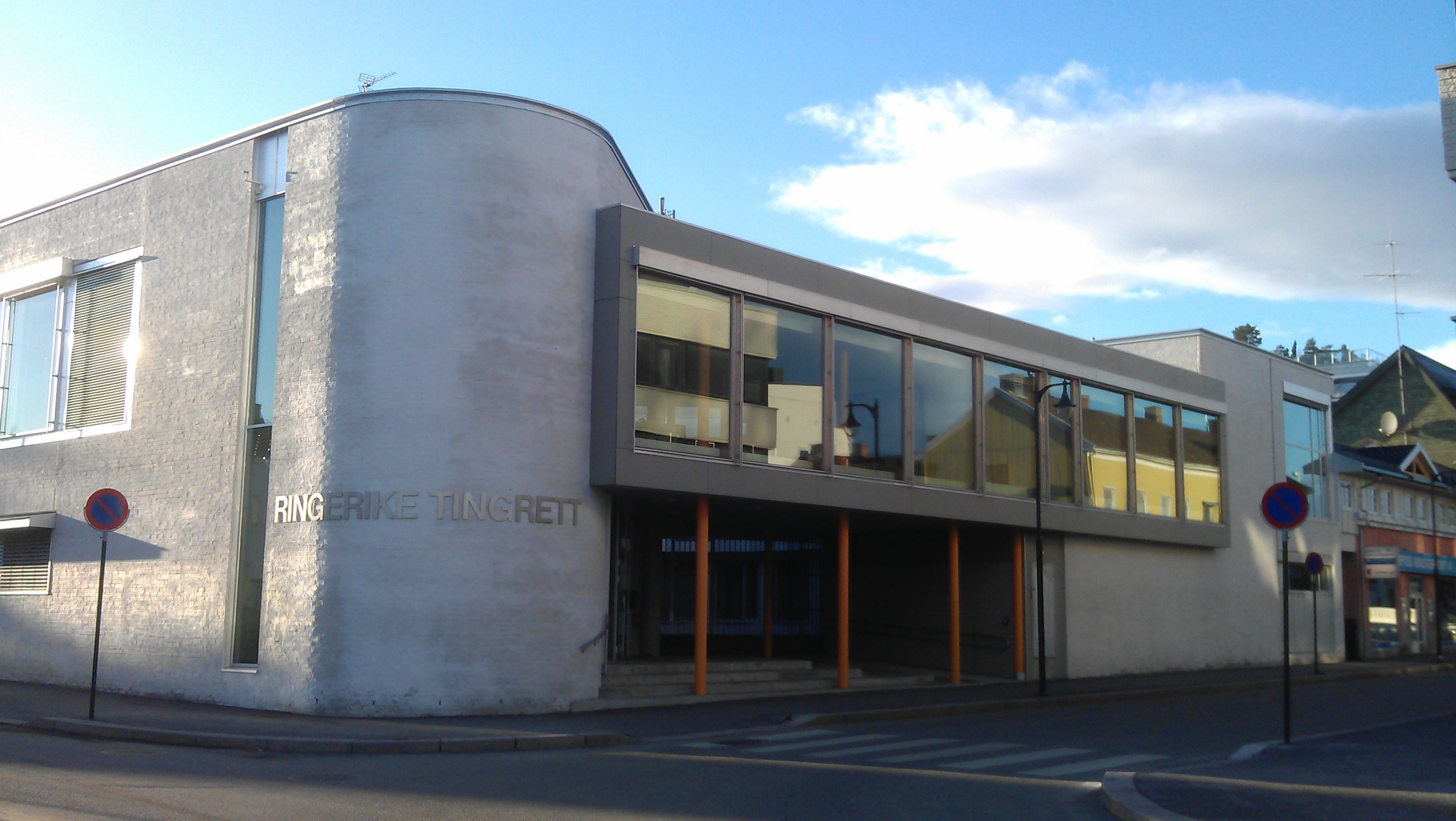
Ringerike District Court

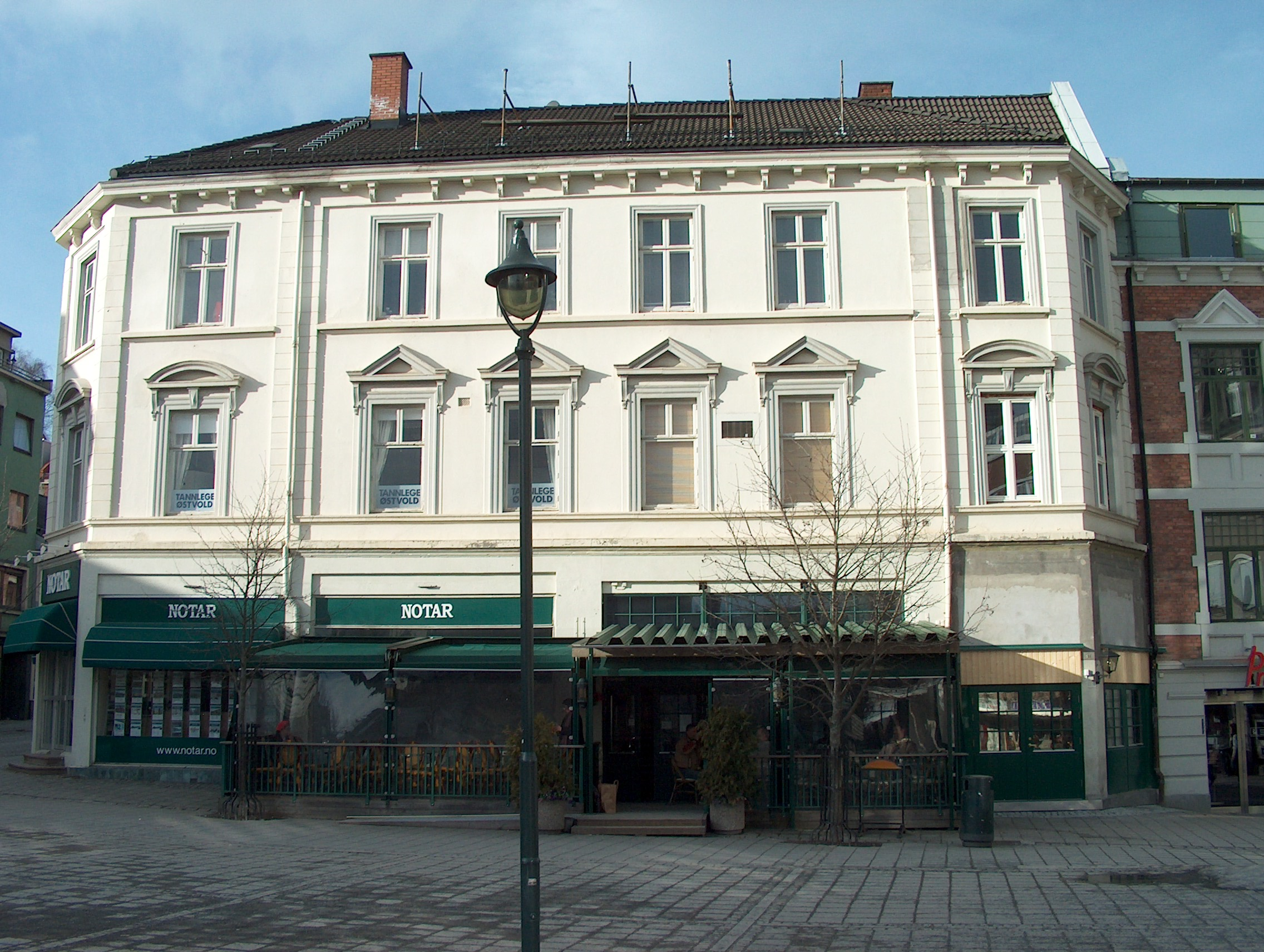
Skøiengården at Søndre Torv in Hønefoss

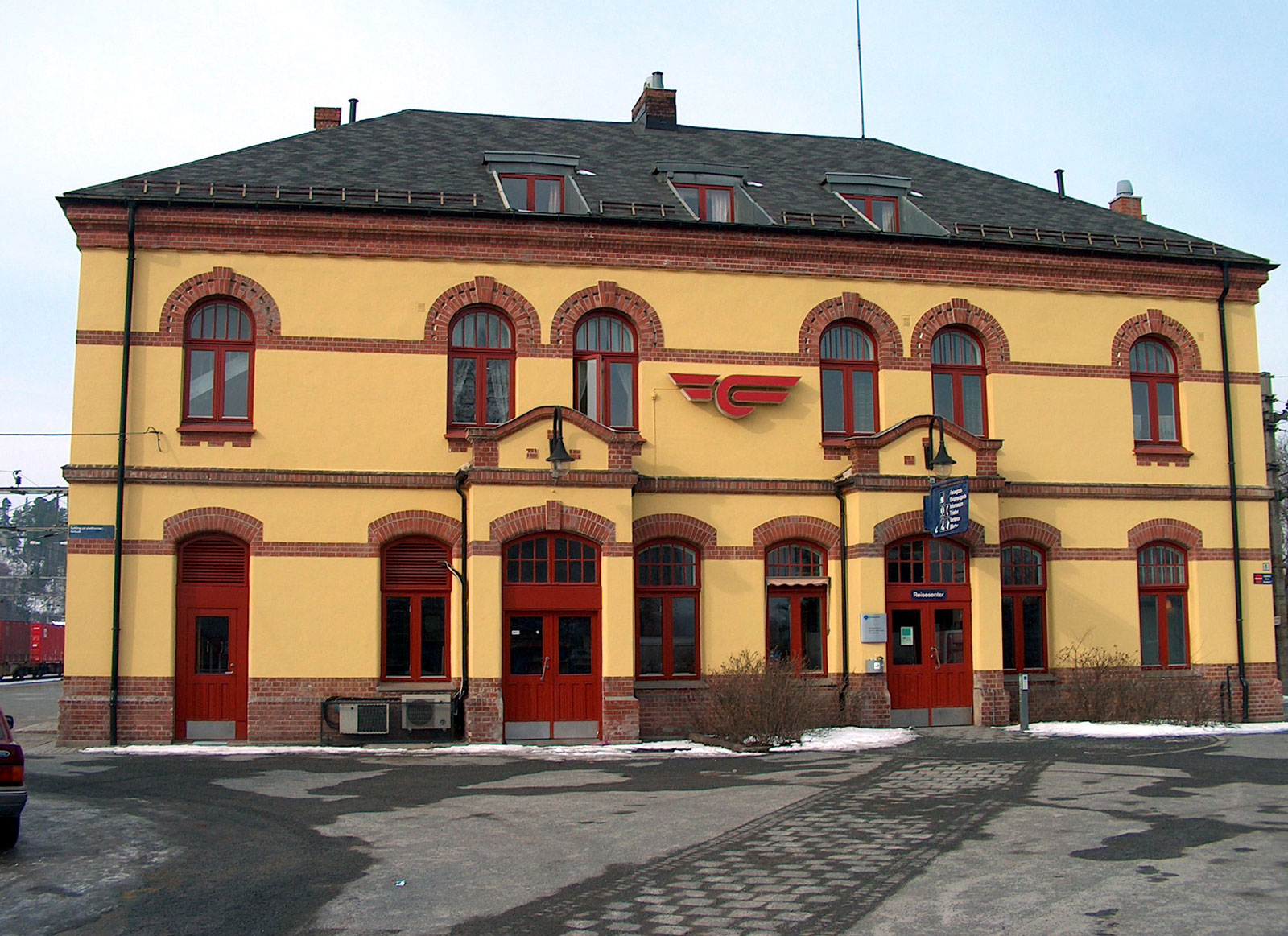
Hønefoss Railway Station

== See also ==
- Kjølfjellet
- Ringerikes Blad
- Ringerike Line
- Ringerike Hospital
